= Timeline of Mary Pickford =

Catalog of events

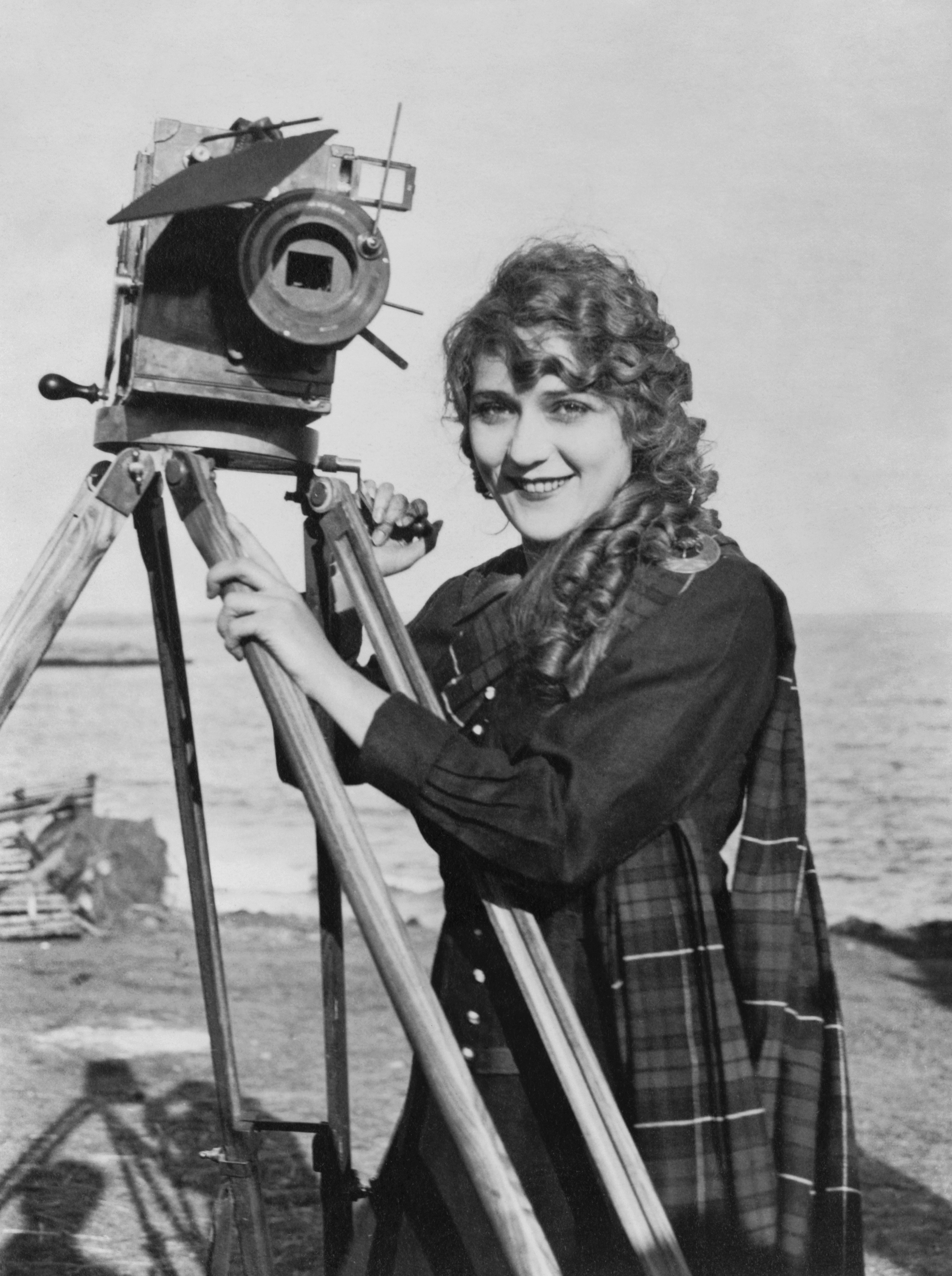
Mary Pickford in 1916

Mary Pickford (1892–1979) was a Canadian motion picture actress, producer, and writer. During the silent film era she became one of the first great celebrities of the cinema and a popular icon known to the public as "America's Sweetheart".

Pickford was born Gladys Marie Smith in Toronto and began acting on stage in 1900. She started her film career in the United States in 1909. Initially with the Biograph film company, she moved to the Independent Motion Picture Company (IMP) in 1911, then briefly to the Majestic Film Company later that same year, followed by a return to Biograph in 1912. After appearing in over 150 short films during her years with these studios she began working in features with Adolph Zukor's Famous Players Film Company, a studio which eventually became part of Paramount Pictures. By 1916 Pickford's popularity had climbed to the point that she was awarded a contract that made her a partner with Zukor and allowed her to produce her films. In 1919 Pickford teamed with D. W. Griffith, Charlie Chaplin, and Douglas Fairbanks to create United Artists, an organization designed to distribute their films. She married Fairbanks in 1920. Following the release of Secrets (1933), Pickford retired from acting in motion pictures, but remained active as a producer for several years afterward. She sold her stock in United Artists in 1956.

The timeline offered here presents significant events in Mary Pickford's life and juxtaposes them against notable events in the history and development of cinema. More emphasis is placed on the silent era, when she was most active, with particular attention to her three United Artists partners. Also presented are notable events that occurred in the United States.

== Timeline ==
=== Before 1891 ===
Year	Pickford	Cinema	United States
1852			George Aiken's stage adaptation of Harriet Beecher Stowe's novel Uncle Tom's Cabin is first performed
1863			January 26 – The stage play of East Lynne by Clifton W. Tayleure premieres
1869	April 8 – John Charles Smith, Mary Pickford's father, is born in Canada		May 10 – The First transcontinental railroad in North America is completed at Promontory, Utah, by the driving of the "golden spike"
1872	January 1 – Charlotte Hennessey, Mary Pickford's mother, is born in Toronto, Ontario, Canada		
1875		January 22 – David Wark Griffith is born in Oldham County, Kentucky	
1878		June 19 – The Horse in Motion by Eadweard Muybridge is made using sequential photographs of the horse Sallie Gardner, owned by Leland Stanford, running at a 1:40 pace over the Palo Alto track; this is a precursor to motion pictures	February 19 – The phonograph is patented by Thomas Edison
1883		May 23 – Douglas Fairbanks is born in Denver, Colorado	
1888		October 14 – Roundhay Garden Scene is filmed by Louis Le Prince; it is believed to be the oldest surviving film in existence.	
1889		April 16 – Charlie Chaplin is born in London	
1890	John Smith and Charlotte Hennesey marry [date uncertain]		December 29 – A massacre occurs near Wounded Knee Creek on the Lakota Pine Ridge Indian Reservation in South Dakota

=== 1891–1900 ===
Year	Pickford	Cinema	United States
1891		August – Thomas Edison files for a patent for the Kinetoscope, a motion picture camera (which he receives in 1897)	
1892	April 8 – Gladys Marie Smith (later known as Mary Pickford) is born at 211 University Avenue in Toronto, Ontario, Canada (Note: Pickford later claimed that she was born in 1893.)	Development of the Kinetoscope is completed	August 4 – Lizzie Borden is arrested in Fall River, Massachusetts on two counts of murder; November 8 – Grover Cleveland is elected 24th president of the United States
1893	June 9 – Mary's sister, Charlotte Smith (Lottie Pickford), is born in Toronto		
1894		January 9 – Release of Fred Ott's Sneeze, the earliest surviving copyrighted film	
1895	John Smith leaves his wife and children	December 30 – The American Mutoscope and Biograph Company is founded in New Jersey by William Kennedy Dickson, Henry Marvin, Herman Casler and Elias Koopman	November 5 – George B. Selden is granted the first U.S. patent for an automobile
1896	August 18 – Mary's brother, John Charles Smith, Jr (Jack Pickford), is born in Toronto; Gladys becomes seriously ill with diphtheria, is baptized by a Catholic priest and has her middle name changed to "Marie"	April - Release of The Kiss, starring May Irwin and John Rice	December 25 - John Philip Sousa composes The Stars and Stripes Forever
1897	c. August – While working for the Niagara Steam Company, John Charles Smith suffers a serious injury when he hits his head on a dangling pulley (Note: Whitfield does not state the date on which this accident occurred. However, she states the date of his death as February 11, 1898, and that this was six months after the accident.)	March 17 – The Corbett-Fitzsimmons Fight is filmed in Nevada	
1898	February 11 – John Smith, Sr., dies of a cerebral hemorrhage		February 15 – The USS Maine (pictured) is sunk in Havana Harbor after suffering a massive explosion; April 25 – The United States declares war on Spain; August 13 – The Spanish-American war ends
1899	Late in the year, to make extra money, Charlotte rents a room to the manager of the Cummings Stock Company of Toronto, who suggests that Gladys and Lottie be cast in a play		November 21 – Garret Hobart, Vice-President of the United States, dies of heart disease
1900	January 8 – "Baby Gladys Smith" makes her stage debut at Toronto's Princess Theatre playing in The Silver King; April 9 – Baby Gladys begins touring in the play The Littlest Girl		November 8 – William McKinley is re-elected President of the United States with Theodore Roosevelt as his vice-president

=== 1901–1910 ===
Year	Pickford	Cinema	United States
1901	January 29 – Gladys begins a run in the play Bottle's Baby; April 1 – Gladys appears in the play The Little Red School House; April 8 – Gladys' ninth birthday; she begins performing as Little Eva in a production of Uncle Tom's Cabin; May – Gladys appears in a production of East Lynne		September 6 – While attending the Pan-American Exposition in Buffalo, New York, William McKinley, President of the United States, is fatally shot by Leon Czolgosz; September 14 – McKinley dies; Vice-President Theodore Roosevelt is sworn in as President
1902	From this year until 1906 Gladys, Charlotte, Jack, and Lottie tour in numerous plays. Among the ones Mary appears in are Wedded But No Wife, The Gypsy Girl, For a Human Life, The Convict Stripes, and, for nineteen weeks, The Fatal Wedding	March 10 – A Circuit Court decision ends Thomas Edison's monopoly on 35 mm movie film technology; August – Release of the French film A Trip to the Moon by Georges Méliès	August 22 – Theodore Roosevelt becomes the first sitting president to take a public car ride
1903	May 18 – Gladys portrays a consumptive boy in the play The Soudan	December 19 – Release of The Great Train Robbery, directed by Edwin S. Porter	February 11 – The United States Congress adopts the Expediting Act; December 17 – The Wright Brothers make the first successful airplane flight (pictured)
1904	Gladys tours in the play Wedded But No Wife	August 13 – Charles "Buddy" Rogers is born	May 4 – U.S. Army engineers begin work on the Panama Canal
1905	The Smith family becomes acquainted with fellow stage actors Lillian and Dorothy Gish and their mother, Mary, when both families share a room in Manhattan one summer; Gladys tours in the play The Gypsy Girl; October 2–28 – Gladys, Jack, and Lottie appear in the play Edmund Burke starring Chauncey Olcott (pictured) at the Majestic Theatre in New York		March 17 – Franklin D. Roosevelt marries Eleanor Roosevelt
1906	May – Edmund Burke closes; Gladys tours in a production of Wedded But No Wife	September – Florence Lawrence makes her film debut in the Vitagraph production The Automobile Thieves	February 26 – The Jungle by Upton Sinclair is published; April 18 – A massive earthquake strikes San Francisco, California
1907	Gladys tours in For a Human Life; At the suggestion of theatrical producer David Belasco, Gladys Smith becomes Mary Pickford; Charlotte, Lottie, and Jack take the name of Pickford as well; December 3 – Mary (pictured) begins her run in William de Mille's play, The Warrens of Virginia, at the Belasco Theatre on Broadway; William's brother, Cecil, plays Mary's older brother (Note: Cecil B. DeMille went on to direct a film version of The Warrens of Virginia (1915) with Marjorie Daw in Mary's role.)	July 11 – Douglas Fairbanks marries Anna Beth Sully; December 7 – Release of an unauthorized film production of Ben-Hur by the Kalem Company, directed by Sidney Olcott	February – President Roosevelt appoints Colonel George Washington Goethals chief engineer of the Panama Canal.
1908	May 16 – The Warrens of Virginia ends its first run; September 28 – The Warrens of Virginia begins a second season	January 18 – Release of Rescued from an Eagle's Nest by the Edison Company; this is the film debut of D. W. Griffith; July 14 – Release of The Adventures of Dollie by the Biograph Company; this is the first film directed by D. W. Griffith	November 3 – William Howard Taft is elected President of the United States
1909	March 20 – The Warrens of Virginia ends its run; with no more stage work scheduled, Charlotte suggests that Mary try entering the motion picture industry; April — Mary successfully auditions for director D. W. Griffith at the Biography Film Studio in New York City; she signs with him for a salary of $10.00 per day; later on she helps her mother and siblings to become employed with Biograph; April 20 – Mary's first day working for Griffith; she appears as an extra in Her First Biscuits; she meets Owen Moore (Note: During this first period with Biograph she appeared in 82 short films. All of these films are known to survive.); May 24 – Release of Two Memories, the first released film featuring Mary; June 7 – Release of The Violin Maker of Cremona with Mary co-starring with Owen Moore; July 15 – Release of They Would Elope; August 21 – A review in the New York Dramatic Mirror writes of They Would Elope: "This delicious little comedy introduced again an ingénue whose work in Biograph pictures is attracting attention"; August 23 – Release of The Indian Runner's Romance, a western with Mary as a Native American	December – The Motion Picture Patents Company ("The Trust") is formed (Note: The following companies participated in "The Trust": Selig, Biograph, Vitagraph, Essanay, Lubin, Kalem, Méliès, Pathé, and a distributing company formed by George Kleine); December 9 – Douglas Fairbanks, Jr. is born	June 9–August 7 – Alice Huyler Ramsey becomes the first woman to drive across the United States
1910	January – Mary travels to Southern California with the Biograph Company, where they will film through the winter; during this time, Florence Lawrence (pictured), known as "The Biograph Girl" moves to Carl Laemmle's IMP Company, and Mary Pickford becomes the new "Biograph Girl"		October 11 – Theodore Roosevelt, former president of the United States, becomes the first U.S. president to fly in an airplane
1910	May 23 – Release of Ramona with Mary in the title role and Henry B. Walthall as Alessandro; this is the first film version of the classic novel by Helen Hunt Jackson; December – Mary leaves Griffith and signs on with IMP at $175 per week (Note: Of the nearly 40 films Pickford made for IMP only 13 are known to survive.)	March 10 – IMP announces: WE NAIL A LIE, refuting a story published in the Motion Picture World that Florence Lawrence had been killed in a car accident; IMP stated that the story was false and that Lawrence was "in the best of health"	October 11 – Theodore Roosevelt, former president of the United States, becomes the first U.S. president to fly in an airplane

=== 1911–1915 ===
Year	Pickford	Cinema	United States
1911	January 7 – Mary and Owen Moore are married in a secret ceremony in Jersey City, New Jersey; January 9 – Mary stars with Owen Moore in her first IMP short, Their First Misunderstanding; shortly afterward, the IMP company moves to Palacio del Carneado, just outside of Havana, Cuba; September – After returning to New York from Cuba, Mary leaves IMP and signs with the Majestic Company at $225 per week (Note: Pickford made only five films during her brief tenure at Majestic. Only one survives (Little Red Riding Hood [1911]).)	April 8 – Release of Little Nemo, an animated film by cartoonist Winsor McCay (hand-colored frame pictured)	March 25 – The Triangle Shirtwaist Factory fire occurs in the Asch Building in lower Manhattan, killing 146 workers; April 17 – At the Big Easter Vaudeville Carnival at Chicago's American Music Hall, singer Emma Carus gives what is probably the first public performance of a new song by Irving Berlin called "Alexander's Ragtime Band"
1912	January – After filming five short films with Majestic, Mary returns to the Biograph Company with a reduced salary of $175 per week (Note: Pickford made 26 films during her second period with Biograph. All are known to survive.); June 17 – Release of Lena and the Geese, a film based on a short story written by Mary; Summer – After seeing Mary on-screen in Lena and the Geese, Lillian and Dorothy Gish come to Biograph where Mary introduces them to D. W. Griffith, who hires them both; December 5 — Release of The New York Hat, the final film Mary made for Biograph and D. W. Griffith (Note: However, The Unwelcome Guest released in 1913, had been shot before but released after The New York Hat.); December – Mary leaves Biograph and Griffith when David Belasco casts in his new stage production, A Good Little Devil	July – Mack Sennett, an actor with the Biograph Company, forms Keystone Studios; Adolph Zukor, a theatre owner, buys the rights to the French film Queen Elizabeth, starring Sarah Bernhardt, and exhibits it in the United States to great success; after this Zukor and Daniel Frohman form the Famous Players Film Company	April 14–15 – On route to New York, the ocean liner RMS Titanic strikes an iceberg and sinks with a loss of 1,514 lives
1913	January 9 – Mary debuts as Julia in A Good Little Devil at Belasco's Republic Theatre, and receives glowing reviews; April – Mary signs a one-year contract with Adolph Zukor at Famous Players for $500 a week; May – Zukor films a feature version of A Good Little Devil in which Mary reprises her role as Julia; Zukor shelves it for eleven months and releases it in 1914 (Note: Only one reel of A Good Little Devil is known to survive.); September 10 – Release of In the Bishop's Carriage, Mary's second feature but the first to be released (Note: No prints of In the Bishop's Carriage are known to survive.); Shortly after filming Caprice, Mary undergoes an appendectomy; November – Release of Caprice (Note: No prints of Caprice are known to survive.)	December 29 – Charlie Chaplin signs a contract with Mack Sennett (pictured in 1916) to begin making films at Keystone Studios	February 3 – The Sixteenth Amendment to the United States Constitution is ratified, authorizing the Federal government to impose and collect income taxes; October 10 – President Woodrow Wilson triggers the explosion of the Gamboa Dike, ending construction on the Panama Canal; October 31 – The Lincoln Highway, the first automobile road across the United States, is dedicated
1914	February 10 – Release of Hearts Adrift (Note: No prints of Hearts Adrift are known to survive.); March 1 – Release of A Good Little Devil; March 20 – Tess of the Storm Country is released to great success; Variety declares "Little Mary Pickford comes into her own," and that she has stuck "another feather in her movie crown"; Mary's fame soars and her salary is doubled to $1000 a week, making her the world's highest-paid actress; April – Mary meets artist and writer Frances Marion and a lifelong personal and professional relationship begins; July 5 – Release of The Eagle's Mate, Mary's first feature directed by her old Biograph friend, James Kirkwood, who also co-stars; September 21 – Release of Such a Little Queen (Note: No prints of Such a Little Queen are known to survive.); October 26 – Release of Behind the Scenes; December 28, 1914 – Release of Cinderella; Movie theater owner David Grauman gives Mary the nickname "AMERICA'S SWEETHEART"	February 2 – Charlie Chaplin's first film, Making a Living is released; February 7 – Release of Charlie Chaplin's second film, the Keystone comedy Kid Auto Races at Venice (pictured), in which his character of The Tramp is introduced to audiences (although Mabel's Strange Predicament was filmed earlier but released two days later); March 8 - Release of Judith of Bethulia, D. W. Griffith's first feature film and last production for the Biograph Company; March 31 – Release of the serial The Perils of Pauline; December 3 – Release of The Bargain, the film that establishes William S. Hart as a Western star	July 11 – Baseball player Babe Ruth makes his major league debut with the Boston Red Sox; July 14 – World War I begins; August 15 – The Panama Canal is inaugurated with the passage of the steamship USS Ancon
1915	January – Mary's salary is doubled to $2000 per week; February 1 – Release of Mistress Nell; May 10 – Release of Fanchon the Cricket, the only feature with Mary, Lottie, and Jack Pickford; June 6 – Release of The Dawn of a Tomorrow; July 1 – Release of Little Pal; August 2 – Release of Rags; September 6 – Release of Esmeralda (Note: No prints of Esmeralda are known to survive.); October 7 – Release of A Girl of Yesterday (Note: No prints of A Girl of Yesterday are known to survive.); November 8 – Release of Madame Butterfly	January 1 – The Birth of a Nation (then titled The Clansman) has its first public showing in Riverside, California; January 12 – Release of A Fool There Was, starring Theda Bara; January – Charlie Chaplin begins working for Essanay Studios; March 2 – The Birth of a Nation opens in New York City; July 19 – The Triangle Film Corporation is formed; July – Douglas Fairbanks arrives in Hollywood, having been signed to a contract with Triangle; September 23 – Premiere of The Lamb, starring Douglas Fairbanks in his film debut	May 7 – The RMS Lusitania is sunk (pictured) on passage from New York to Britain by a German U-boat, killing 1,198; this leads indirectly to the United States' entry into World War I; June 22 – The Imperial Valley earthquakes shake Southern California
1915	November – Mary attends a party at the home of friend Elsie Janis in Tarrytown, NY where she meets Douglas Fairbanks (pictured); both are married and at the party with their spouses, but the two strike a friendship		May 7 – The RMS Lusitania is sunk (pictured) on passage from New York to Britain by a German U-boat, killing 1,198; this leads indirectly to the United States' entry into World War I; June 22 – The Imperial Valley earthquakes shake Southern California
1915	December – David Belasco refers to Mary as "The Queen of the Movies"; Unknown date – Lottie Pickford, Mary's sister, marries New York broker Alfred Rupp		May 7 – The RMS Lusitania is sunk (pictured) on passage from New York to Britain by a German U-boat, killing 1,198; this leads indirectly to the United States' entry into World War I; June 22 – The Imperial Valley earthquakes shake Southern California

=== 1916–1920 ===
Year	Pickford	Cinema	United States
1916	January 3 – Release of The Foundling; February 20 – Release of Poor Little Peppina; March 10 – Lottie Pickford gives birth to a daughter, Mary Pickford Rupp; April 17 – Release of The Eternal Grind; May – Mary and Adolph Zukor renegotiate her salary again, settling on $10,000 a week and giving her the power to choose her own projects, writers and directors, releasing films under the Artcraft name; July 31 – Release of Hulda from Holland; August – Mary Pickford Film Corporation is formed and will produce only Pickford films to be distributed by the Artcraft division at Famous Players–Lasky; October 25 – Jack Pickford marries actress Olive Thomas (pictured); November 6 – Release of Less Than the Dust	February 26 – Charlie Chaplin signs for Mutual Film for a salary of $10,000 a week and a signing on fee of $150,000; June 28 – Famous Players merges with Jesse L. Lasky's Feature Play Company, forming Famous Players–Lasky; September – Famous Players–Lasky Corporation takes control of Paramount Pictures; September 5 – Release of D. W. Griffith's epic film Intolerance	March 15 – President Woodrow Wilson sends 12,000 United States troops over the U.S.-Mexico border to pursue Pancho Villa
1916	December – Mary and Douglas Fairbanks share an emotional drive through Central Park after Fairbanks' mother dies, and the two begin their love affair; shortly afterward, Mary moves permanently to Los Angeles		March 15 – President Woodrow Wilson sends 12,000 United States troops over the U.S.-Mexico border to pursue Pancho Villa
1917	January 8 – Release of The Pride of the Clan; March 5 – Release of The Poor Little Rich Girl, written by Frances Marion; Mary, at 25, convincingly plays a girl of 12; May 14 – Release of A Romance of the Redwoods, directed by Cecil B. DeMille; July 2 – Release of The Little American, directed by Cecil B. DeMille; September 22 – Release of Rebecca of Sunnybrook Farm, adapted by Frances Marion; November 5 – Release of A Little Princess, adapted by Frances Marion	February – Douglas Fairbanks forms the Douglas Fairbanks Picture Corporation; with this he will produce his films for release by the Artcraft Pictures Corporation; August 27 – Release of Straight Shooting, directed by John Ford (his first feature) and starring Harry Carey; October 14 – Release of Cleopatra starring Theda Bara	January 22 – President Woodrow Wilson calls for "peace without victory" in Europe; March 7 – "Livery Stable Blues", recorded by the Original Dixieland Jazz Band, becomes the first jazz recording commercially released; April 6 – The United States enters World War I
1918	January 21 – Release of Stella Maris, with Mary playing dual roles of pampered invalid Stella Maris and homely orphan Unity Blake (pictured); March 11 – Release of Amarilly of Clothes-Line Alley; c. June 16 — Cupid Angling, starring Ruth Roland, is released. Filmed in the Douglass color process, it features cameo appearances by Mary and Douglas Fairbanks	January 27 — Release of Tarzan of the Apes, starring Elmo Lincoln; March 12 – Release of Hearts of the World, directed by D. W. Griffith and starring Lillian and Dorothy Gish	January 8 – President Woodrow Wilson delivers his Fourteen Points speech; March 4 – Private Albert Gitchell, a soldier at Camp Funston, Kansas falls sick with the first confirmed case of the Spanish flu
1918	April – Mary, Douglas Fairbanks, Marie Dressler, and Charlie Chaplin tour the country promoting Liberty Bonds; together they sell over $18 billion in bonds		
1918	April 18 – Release of M'Liss; June 23 – Release of How Could You, Jean?, directed by William Desmond Taylor (Note: No prints of How Could You, Jean? are known to survive.); September 29 – Release of Johanna Enlists, directed by William Desmond Taylor; November 6 – Mary accepts an offer from First National Pictures for $675,000 plus 50% of the profits for three pictures	October 22 – Beth Fairbanks, the wife of Douglas Fairbanks, files for divorce on grounds of infidelity, without naming a correspondent	September 12–16 – The Battle of Saint-Mihiel is fought; the American Expeditionary Forces under General John J. Pershing score an allied victory; November 11 – The Armistice is signed, signaling the end of World War I
1919	January 15 – Mary, Douglas Fairbanks, Charlie Chaplin, D. W. Griffith, and William S. Hart draw up a letter of intention to form United Artists; February 5 – After Hart's withdrawal, Mary, Fairbanks, Chaplin, and Griffith (picture) officially join forces to form United Artists Corporation		January 16 – The 18th Amendment to the United States Constitution, authorizing Prohibition, goes into effect in the United States; July 7 – The First Transcontinental Motor Convoy: The U.S. Army sends an expedition across the continental U.S., starting in Washington, D.C., to determine how well troops could be moved from one side of the country to the other by motor vehicles
1919	April 6 – Release of Captain Kidd, Jr. (Note: No prints of Captain Kidd, Jr. are known to survive.); May 11, 1919 – Release of Daddy-Long-Legs, Mary's first film for First National Pictures; September 1 – Release of The Hoodlum; November 17 – Release of Heart o' the Hills, Mary's final release for First National Pictures	April 22 – Douglas Fairbanks purchases a former hunting lodge in Beverly Hills; it will be revamped and expanded into the home later known as Pickfair; September 1 — Release of His Majesty, the American, Fairbanks' first film for United Artists; October 20 – Release of Broken Blossoms, director D. W. Griffith's first release for United Artists, starring Lillian Gish and Richard Barthelmess; December 28 — Release of When the Clouds Roll By, starring Douglas Fairbanks	January 16 – The 18th Amendment to the United States Constitution, authorizing Prohibition, goes into effect in the United States; July 7 – The First Transcontinental Motor Convoy: The U.S. Army sends an expedition across the continental U.S., starting in Washington, D.C., to determine how well troops could be moved from one side of the country to the other by motor vehicles
1920	January 18 – Release of Pollyanna, adapted by Frances Marion, is Mary's first production for United Artists		August 18 – The 19th Amendment to the United States Constitution is passed, guaranteeing women's suffrage; November 2 – Warren G. Harding is elected President of the United States
1920	March 2 – Mary travels with her mother, Charlotte, to Nevada to obtain a divorce from Owen Moore on grounds of desertion; March 28 – Mary and Douglas Fairbanks marry in an intimate ceremony at the Glendale, California, home of Reverend J. Whitcomb Brougher; they move into a converted hunting lodge in Beverly Hills owned by Fairbanks, later to be dubbed "Pickfair"; June–July – Mary and Doug honeymoon in Europe, visit London and Paris where they are swarmed by fans		August 18 – The 19th Amendment to the United States Constitution is passed, guaranteeing women's suffrage; November 2 – Warren G. Harding is elected President of the United States
1920	June 27 – Release of Suds; September 10 – Olive Thomas, the wife of Jack Pickford, dies in Paris of mercurial poisoning; Lottie Pickford and her husband, Alfred Rupp, are divorced; Lottie relinquishes custody of her daughter, Mary Pickford Rupp (later known as Gwynne), to her mother, Charlotte	April 2 - Release of The Love Flower, directed by D. W. Griffith and starring Richard Barthelmess; June 30 – Release of The Mollycoddle, starring Douglas Fairbanks; November 29 – Release of The Mark of Zorro, starring Douglas Fairbanks	August 18 – The 19th Amendment to the United States Constitution is passed, guaranteeing women's suffrage; November 2 – Warren G. Harding is elected President of the United States

=== 1921–1925 ===
Year	Pickford	Cinema	United States
1921	The Motion Picture Relief Fund is created by (among others) Mary, Charlie Chaplin, Douglas Fairbanks, and D. W. Griffith, with Mary elected as vice-president		August 5 – The first baseball game is broadcast on radio; September 14 – Margaret Gorman, age 16, becomes the first Miss America
1921	January 9 – Release of The Love Light, directed by Frances Marion; May 17 – Release of Through the Back Door; Release of They Shall Pay starring Lottie Pickford; produced by Mary; September 11 – Release of Little Lord Fauntleroy, with Mary in the dual role of the title character and his mother	January 21 – Release of The Kid with Charlie Chaplin and Jackie Coogan; March 6 — Release of The Nut with Douglas Fairbanks; March 6 — Release of The Four Horsemen of the Apocalypse starring Rudolph Valentino; April 23 - Release of Dream Street directed by D. W. Griffith; Owen Moore marries actress Katherine Perry; August 28 – Premiere of The Three Musketeers starring Douglas Fairbanks; September 5 – Roscoe "Fatty" Arbuckle attends a party at the St. Francis Hotel, San Francisco, during which actress Virginia Rappe is fatally injured; September 9 – Rappe dies of a ruptured bladder; November – Arbuckle is charged with her manslaughter; November 20 – Release of The Sheik starring Rudolph Valentino; December 28 – Premiere of Orphans of the Storm, directed by D. W. Griffith and starring Lillian and Dorothy Gish	August 5 – The first baseball game is broadcast on radio; September 14 – Margaret Gorman, age 16, becomes the first Miss America
1922	Mary and Doug open the Pickford-Fairbanks Studio at Santa Monica Blvd and Formosa Ave in Hollywood (pictured); Mary considers making a film version of Faust with Doug co-starring and Ernst Lubitsch directed; however this is abandoned (Note: A test reel survives.)		April 7 – The Teapot Dome scandal begins when Albert B. Fall, the United States Secretary of the Interior, leases Teapot Dome oil reserves in Wyoming to private oil companies
1922	January 8 – Lottie Pickford marries actor Allan Forrest; July 30 – Jack Pickford marries dancer Marilyn Miller; October – Mary hires German director Ernst Lubitsch to helm Dorothy Vernon of Haddon Hall; he will instead direct Pickford in Rosita; November 12 – Release of Mary's second version of Tess of the Storm Country	February 1 – Director William Desmond Taylor is shot to death by an unknown assailant in Los Angeles; April 2 – Release of Pay Day starring Charlie Chaplin; April 12 — Roscoe "Fatty" Arbuckle is acquitted on manslaughter charges; one week later Will H. Hays has him banned from working in the motion picture industry; October 2 – Premiere of One Exciting Night, directed by D. W. Griffith; October 18 – Premiere of Robin Hood starring Douglas Fairbanks; this was his most successful film	April 7 – The Teapot Dome scandal begins when Albert B. Fall, the United States Secretary of the Interior, leases Teapot Dome oil reserves in Wyoming to private oil companies
1923	January 15 – Release of Garrison's Finish starring Jack Pickford; Mary was involved in the film's production	February 25 – Release of The Pilgrim, Charlie Chaplin's final short film and his last for First National Pictures; March 16 - Premiere of The Covered Wagon, directed James Cruze; November 23 – Release of Stephen Steps Out, the first film starring Douglas Fairbanks, Jr.	August 2 – Warren G. Harding, President of the United States, dies; Vice President Calvin Coolidge is sworn in as president
1923	August 19 – Release of Hollywood, which features cameo appearances by numerous film stars, including Mary, Doug, and Charlie Chaplin (Note: No prints of Hollywood are known to survive.)		August 2 – Warren G. Harding, President of the United States, dies; Vice President Calvin Coolidge is sworn in as president
1923	September 3 – Release of Rosita, directed by Ernst Lubitsch	September 2 – Premiere of The Hunchback of Notre Dame starring Lon Chaney; October 1 — Release of A Woman of Paris, directed by Charlie Chaplin and released by United Artists; Release of The Ten Commandments, directed by Cecil B. DeMille	August 2 – Warren G. Harding, President of the United States, dies; Vice President Calvin Coolidge is sworn in as president
1924	March 15 – Release of Dorothy Vernon of Haddon Hall; March 15 – Release of The Hill Billy starring Jack Pickford; Mary was involved in the film's production	February 21 – Premiere of America, directed by D. W. Griffith; March 24 - Premiere of Secrets, Starring Norma Talmadge	February 12 – Premiere of Rhapsody in Blue by George Gershwin, in an afternoon concert held by Paul Whiteman and his band, the Palais Royal Orchestra, at Aeolian Hall in New York City.; May 10 – J. Edgar Hoover is appointed director of the FBI; July 2 – The United States Congress enacts the Indian Citizenship Act
1924	April 13-July 20 – Mary and Doug board the RMS Olympic to England, where they meet Noël Coward and visit Haddon Hall; they travel on to France, Spain, Germany, Switzerland, Belgium, Sweden and Norway; the return to New York on the SS Leviathan		February 12 – Premiere of Rhapsody in Blue by George Gershwin, in an afternoon concert held by Paul Whiteman and his band, the Palais Royal Orchestra, at Aeolian Hall in New York City.; May 10 – J. Edgar Hoover is appointed director of the FBI; July 2 – The United States Congress enacts the Indian Citizenship Act
1924		August 28 – Premiere of The Iron Horse, directed by John Ford; November 23 – Release of Isn't Life Wonderful, directed by D. W. Griffith; December 25 – Premiere of The Thief of Bagdad starring Douglas Fairbanks	February 12 – Premiere of Rhapsody in Blue by George Gershwin, in an afternoon concert held by Paul Whiteman and his band, the Palais Royal Orchestra, at Aeolian Hall in New York City.; May 10 – J. Edgar Hoover is appointed director of the FBI; July 2 – The United States Congress enacts the Indian Citizenship Act
1925	March 29 – Release of Waking Up the Town; Mary buys 132 reels of her Biograph films; October 18 – Release of Little Annie Rooney	June 25 – Premiere of Don Q, Son of Zorro starring Douglas Fairbanks; August 9 – Release of Sally of the Sawdust, directed by D. W. Griffith and starring W. C. Fields; August 16 – Premiere of The Gold Rush starring Charlie Chaplin; September 6 – Premiere of The Phantom of the Opera starring Lon Chaney; November 16 – Premiere of Stella Dallas starring Ronald Colman and Douglas Fairbanks Jr.; November 19 – Premiere of The Big Parade starring John Gilbert; December 30 – Premiere of Ben-Hur: A Tale of the Christ starring Ramon Novarro	April 10 – Publication The Great Gatsby by F. Scott Fitzgerald; July 10 – The Scopes Trial begins in Dayton, Tennessee; John T. Scopes is eventually found guilty of teaching evolution in class and fined $100

=== 1926–1930 ===
Year	Pickford	Cinema	United States
1926	February – Charlotte undergoes surgery for a breast tumor		March 16 – Dr. Robert H. Goddard successfully tests the first rocket using liquid fuel at Auburn, Massachusetts
1926	March 8 – Mary and Doug arrive in New York to attend the premiere of Doug's Technicolor film The Black Pirate (Note: Mary has an uncredited cameo in The Black Pirate.); April – Mary, Doug, Gwynne and Charlotte board the SS Conte Biancamano to Italy, where they hear Benito Mussolini speak; they travel to Russia in July, and a film is made of their visit (A Kiss from Mary Pickford, 1927)		March 16 – Dr. Robert H. Goddard successfully tests the first rocket using liquid fuel at Auburn, Massachusetts
1926		April 4 - Premiere of Kiki starring Norma Talmadge and Ronald Colman	March 16 – Dr. Robert H. Goddard successfully tests the first rocket using liquid fuel at Auburn, Massachusetts
1926	May 14 – Sid Grauman's Egyptian Theatre in Hollywood features a double premiere: Mary Pickford's Sparrows and Douglas Fairbanks' The Black Pirate		March 16 – Dr. Robert H. Goddard successfully tests the first rocket using liquid fuel at Auburn, Massachusetts
1926		July 9 – Premiere of The Son of the Sheik starring Rudolph Valentino; August 6 – Premiere of Don Juan starring John Barrymore, the first feature film release with Vitaphone synchronized sound; August 23 – Rudolph Valentino dies	March 16 – Dr. Robert H. Goddard successfully tests the first rocket using liquid fuel at Auburn, Massachusetts
1926	September 3 - Mary, Doug, Gwynne, and Charlotte return home due to Charlotte's illness, thus forcing them to abandon plans to go to China		March 16 – Dr. Robert H. Goddard successfully tests the first rocket using liquid fuel at Auburn, Massachusetts
1927	April 30 – Mary and Doug become the first stars to imprint their hands and feet in cement in the forecourt of Grauman's Chinese Theater in Hollywood; May 11 – Mary and Doug are among 36 founders of the Academy of Motion Picture Arts and Sciences, and Doug is elected its first president		January 10 – The comic strip Little Annie Rooney begins its run in newspapers; May 20–21 – Charles Lindbergh (pictured) makes the first solo non-stop trans-Atlantic flight, from New York to Paris in the single-seat, single-engine monoplane Spirit of St. Louis; June 13 – A ticker-tape parade is held for aviator Charles Lindbergh down Fifth Avenue in New York City; December 27 – Kern and Hammerstein's musical Show Boat opens on Broadway
1927	c. July – Lottie Pickford secures a divorce from Allan Forrest	April 12 – Premiere of Wings starring Clara Bow and Charles "Buddy" Rogers; April 29 – Premiere of The King of Kings, directed by Cecil B. DeMille; October 6 – Premiere of The Jazz Singer, produced by Warner Bros. and starring Al Jolson; this is the first major feature-length film with talking sequences	January 10 – The comic strip Little Annie Rooney begins its run in newspapers; May 20–21 – Charles Lindbergh (pictured) makes the first solo non-stop trans-Atlantic flight, from New York to Paris in the single-seat, single-engine monoplane Spirit of St. Louis; June 13 – A ticker-tape parade is held for aviator Charles Lindbergh down Fifth Avenue in New York City; December 27 – Kern and Hammerstein's musical Show Boat opens on Broadway
1927	October 31 – My Best Girl, Mary's final silent film, is released; the picture co-stars Charles "Buddy" Rogers; November 21 – Premiere of The Gaucho starring Douglas Fairbanks and featuring Mary in a cameo appearance (Note: A Technicolor test of Mary was made for The Gaucho. However, Fairbanks decided not to use color in the final print of the film. The test survives.)		January 10 – The comic strip Little Annie Rooney begins its run in newspapers; May 20–21 – Charles Lindbergh (pictured) makes the first solo non-stop trans-Atlantic flight, from New York to Paris in the single-seat, single-engine monoplane Spirit of St. Louis; June 13 – A ticker-tape parade is held for aviator Charles Lindbergh down Fifth Avenue in New York City; December 27 – Kern and Hammerstein's musical Show Boat opens on Broadway
1927	November 2 – Jack Pickford and Marilyn Miller are divorced		January 10 – The comic strip Little Annie Rooney begins its run in newspapers; May 20–21 – Charles Lindbergh (pictured) makes the first solo non-stop trans-Atlantic flight, from New York to Paris in the single-seat, single-engine monoplane Spirit of St. Louis; June 13 – A ticker-tape parade is held for aviator Charles Lindbergh down Fifth Avenue in New York City; December 27 – Kern and Hammerstein's musical Show Boat opens on Broadway
1928	March 21 – Charlotte Pickford, age 55, dies of breast cancer	January 7 – Premiere of The Circus starring Charlie Chaplin	February 8 – British inventor John Logie Baird broadcasts a transatlantic television signal from London to Hartsdale, New York; November 6 – U.S. presidential election, 1928: Republican Herbert Hoover wins by a wide margin over Democratic governor of New York Alfred E. Smith
1928	March 29 – Mary, Doug, Charlie Chaplin, D. W. Griffith, Gloria Swanson, Norma Talmadge, Dolores Del Rio, and John Barrymore lend their voices to a Dodge Motors-sponsored radio broadcast to prove their ability to handle the new technology of talking pictures; the reviews are largely negative		February 8 – British inventor John Logie Baird broadcasts a transatlantic television signal from London to Hartsdale, New York; November 6 – U.S. presidential election, 1928: Republican Herbert Hoover wins by a wide margin over Democratic governor of New York Alfred E. Smith
1928	June 21 – Mary makes the front page of the New York Times and shocks the world by cropping her signature curls into a short bob	July 8 – Release of Lights of New York, produced by Warner Bros.; this is the first all-talkie feature; November 18 – Release of Steamboat Willie, the first Mickey Mouse cartoon; December 15 - Release of A Woman of Affairs starring John Gilbert and Greta Garbo, Douglas Fairbanks Jr.	February 8 – British inventor John Logie Baird broadcasts a transatlantic television signal from London to Hartsdale, New York; November 6 – U.S. presidential election, 1928: Republican Herbert Hoover wins by a wide margin over Democratic governor of New York Alfred E. Smith
1929	April 12 – Release of Coquette, Mary's first sound feature	February 1 – Premiere of The Broadway Melody, MGM's first all-talking film; March 19 – Release of The Iron Mask starring Douglas Fairbanks; a part-talkie; May 16 – The 1st Academy Awards ceremony is held at the Blossom Room of the Hollywood Roosevelt Hotel, with Douglas Fairbanks hosting the event	February 14 – The Saint Valentine's Day Massacre occurs in Chicago; October 24–29 – Wall Street crashes
1929	September – Mary and Doug embark on a "world tour," visiting London, Paris, Switzerland, Egypt, China, and Japan, returning to the US via San Francisco on the Asama Maru; October 26 – Release of The Taming of the Shrew with Mary and Doug co-starring		February 14 – The Saint Valentine's Day Massacre occurs in Chicago; October 24–29 – Wall Street crashes
1930	January – Mary and Doug return home		December 2 – President Herbert Hoover goes before Congress and asks for a $150 million public works program to help generate jobs and stimulate the economy
1930	Mary begins filming Eternally Yours (an early version of her later film Secrets), but eventually abandons production (Note: Footage from Eternally Yours survives.); April 3 – Mary wins the Best Actress Academy Award for her performance in Coquette; August 12 – Jack Pickford marries Mary Mulhern	March 31 – The Motion Pictures Production Code is instituted, imposing strict guidelines on the treatment of sex, crime, religion and violence in motion pictures for the next 40 years; August 24 – Release of All Quiet on the Western Front; October 24 - Premiere of The Big Trail with John Wayne in his first starring role; December 29 – Release of Reaching for the Moon starring Douglas Fairbanks and featuring Bing Crosby	December 2 – President Herbert Hoover goes before Congress and asks for a $150 million public works program to help generate jobs and stimulate the economy

=== 1931–1940 ===
Year	Pickford	Cinema	United States
1931	March 14 – Release of Kiki	January 9 – Release of Little Caesar starring Edward G. Robinson; January 30 – Premiere of City Lights starring Charlie Chaplin; February 14 – Release of Dracula starring Bela Lugosi; June 5 - Premiere of Daddy Long Legs starring Janet Gaynor; December 12 – Release of Around the World in 80 Minutes with Douglas Fairbanks	May 1 – Opening of the Empire State Building in New York City (pictured in 1932); October 17 – Al Capone is sentenced to 11 years in prison for tax evasion in Chicago, Illinois
1932	Mary starts the Payroll Pledge Program, a plan in which movie studio employees donate 0.5% of their paychecks to the Motion Picture Relief Fund	February 12 - Release of Shanghai Express with Marlene Dietrich; April 12 - Premiere of Grand Hotel with Greta Garbo; July 3 - Release of Rebecca of Sunnybrook Farm with Marian Nixon; August 26 – Release of Love Me Tonight with Maurice Chevalier and Jeanette MacDonald; September 17 – Release of Mr. Robinson Crusoe starring Douglas Fairbanks; November 19 - Premiere of Tess of the Storm Country starring Janet Gaynor; December 23 - Premiere of Madame Butterfly starring Sylvia Sidney	March 1 – Charles Lindbergh, Jr. is kidnapped from the family home near Hopewell, New Jersey; November 8 – In the presidential election Franklin D. Roosevelt defeats President Herbert Hoover in a landslide victory
1933	January 3 – Jack Pickford, age 36, dies in Paris due to health problems relating to alcoholism; March 15 – Release of Secrets, Mary's final film as an actress; May – Mary plans with Walt Disney to star in Alice in Wonderland; the project is eventually abandoned (Note: Some test footage survives.)	January 27 - Release of She Done Him Wrong starring Mae West; March 7 – Premiere of King Kong; March 11 – Release of 42nd Street	March 4 – Franklin D. Roosevelt is sworn in as the 32nd president of the United States; November 8 – President Roosevelt unveils the Civil Works Administration; December 5 – The Twenty-first Amendment to the United States Constitution repeals Prohibition in the United States
1933	July 2 – Louella Parsons makes the front pages of newspapers around the country by printing the news that Mary and Doug are separating; December 8 – Mary sues Doug for divorce		March 4 – Franklin D. Roosevelt is sworn in as the 32nd president of the United States; November 8 – President Roosevelt unveils the Civil Works Administration; December 5 – The Twenty-first Amendment to the United States Constitution repeals Prohibition in the United States
1933	December 22 – Mary appears in the play The Church Mouse at the Paramount Theatre on Broadway	December 29 – Release of Flying Down to Rio, the first film to team Fred Astaire with Ginger Rogers	March 4 – Franklin D. Roosevelt is sworn in as the 32nd president of the United States; November 8 – President Roosevelt unveils the Civil Works Administration; December 5 – The Twenty-first Amendment to the United States Constitution repeals Prohibition in the United States
1934	August – Publication of the novel The Demi-Widow by Mary and Belle Burns Gromer; November – Publication of the booklet Why Not Try God? where Mary touts Christian Science	February 23 – Release of It Happened One Night starring Clark Gable and Claudette Colbert; July 1 – The new, stricter production code goes into effect; October 5 – Release of Cleopatra starring Claudette Colbert; November 5 – Release of The Private Life of Don Juan, the last film starring Douglas Fairbanks	June 6 – President Roosevelt signs the Securities Exchange Act into law, establishing the U.S. Securities and Exchange Commission
1935	January 10 – Mary obtains a provisional divorce degree which allows her to keep Pickfair; Mary writes another booklet for the Christian Science church entitled My Rendezvous With Life; September – Mary partners with Jesse L. Lasky to form Pickford-Lasky Productions	August 15 – Popular humorist and film actor Will Rogers is killed in plane crash near Point Barrow, Alaska, along with aviator Wiley Post; November 8 – Release of Mutiny on the Bounty with Charles Laughton and Clark Gable; December 28 – Release of Captain Blood with Errol Flynn in the role that established him as a swashbuckling hero	February 13 – Bruno Richard Hauptmann is found guilty of murder in the Lindbergh kidnapping and is sentenced to death.
1936	January 10 – Mary's divorce from Douglas Fairbanks becomes final		March 1 – Construction of Hoover Dam (pictured) is completed; April 3 – Richard Hauptmann, convicted of the Lindbergh kidnapping and murder in 1932, is executed by electrocution in New Jersey State Prison; June 30 – Publication of Gone with the Wind by Margaret Mitchell
1936	February – Mary begins hosting Parties at Pickfair, a CBS radio program that will be canceled after 13 weeks, proving unpopular with a Depression-era public; May 13 – Release of One Rainy Afternoon starring Ida Lupino, the first Pickford-Lasky production; October 2 – Release of The Gay Desperado, directed by Rouben Mamoulian and starring Ida Lupino; the second Pickford-Lasky production; December 9 – Lottie Pickford dies of a heart attack	February 5 –Premiere of Modern Times starring Charlie Chaplin; March 6 - Release of Little Lord Fauntleroy starring Freddie Bartholomew; March 7 – Douglas Fairbanks marries British socialite Lady Sylvia Ashley; September 25 – Release of Ramona with Loretta Young	March 1 – Construction of Hoover Dam (pictured) is completed; April 3 – Richard Hauptmann, convicted of the Lindbergh kidnapping and murder in 1932, is executed by electrocution in New Jersey State Prison; June 30 – Publication of Gone with the Wind by Margaret Mitchell
1937	June 24 – Mary marries actor and bandleader Charles "Buddy" Rogers	April 20 - Premiere of A Star Is Born with Janet Gaynor and Fredric March; September 1 – Release of Lost Horizon with Ronald Colman; September 3 – Release of The Prisoner of Zenda with Ronald Colman; December 21 – Premiere of Walt Disney's Snow White and the Seven Dwarfs	May 6 – The German airship Hindenburg (pictured) bursts into flame when mooring to a mast in Lakehurst, New Jersey; July 2 – Amelia Earhart and navigator Fred Noonan disappear after taking off from New Guinea during Earhart's attempt to become the first woman to fly around the world
1938	Mary develops Mary Pickford Cosmetics, a range of make-up products designed to be affordable to the masses	March 10 - Premiere of Jezebel starring Bette Davis; March 18 - Release of Rebecca of Sunnybrook Farm starring Shirley Temple; May 14 – Release of The Adventures of Robin Hood starring Errol Flynn	January 3 – The March of Dimes is established as a foundation to combat infant polio by President Franklin D. Roosevelt; April 18 – First publication of Action Comics (cover-dated June) featuring Superman; October 30 – Orson Welles' radio adaptation of The War of the Worlds (with script by Howard Koch) is broadcast, causing panic in various parts of the United States
1939	September 6 – Mary travels to Norfolk, Virginia, to visit her husband, Buddy Rogers, who had fallen ill while touring with his band	February 17 – Release of Gunga Din starring Douglas Fairbanks, Jr.; March 11 - Premiere of The Little Princess starring Shirley Temple; June 9 – Owen Moore dies of a cerebral hemorrhage; August 18 – Premiere of The Wizard of Oz starring Judy Garland; December 12 – Douglas Fairbanks dies of a heart attack; December 15 – Premiere of Gone with the Wind starring Clark Gable and Vivien Leigh	April 30 – The New York World's Fair opens; September 1 – World War II begins; September 5 – The United States declares its neutrality in the war
1940	Mary contemplates having a film biography made of her life with Shirley Temple starring; the project never materializes	March 15 – Release of The Grapes of Wrath, directed by John Ford and starring Henry Fonda; March 28 - Premiere of Rebecca, directed by Alfred Hitchcock and starring Laurence Olivier and Joan Fontaine; December 15 – Premiere of The Great Dictator starring Charlie Chaplin; December 27 - Premiere of The Philadelphia Story starring Cary Grant and Katharine Hepburn	August 4 – Gen. John J. Pershing, in a nationwide radio broadcast, urges all-out aid to Britain in order to defend the Americas, while Charles Lindbergh speaks to an isolationist rally at Soldier Field in Chicago; September 16 – The Selective Training and Service Act of 1940 is signed into law by Franklin D. Roosevelt (pictured), creating the first peacetime draft in U.S. history

=== 1941–1950 ===
Year	Pickford	Cinema	United States
1941	September 21 – Mary breaks ground for what would be the Motion Picture Country House and Hospital	May 1 – Premiere of Citizen Kane, directed by and starring Orson Welles	October 31 – Final drilling takes place on Mount Rushmore; December 7 – The attack on Pearl Harbor by the Japanese triggers the United States into entering World War II (pictured: the destruction of the USS Arizona); December 8 – President Roosevelt delivers his Infamy Speech and declares war on Japan; December 11 – Germany declares war on the United States and the United States declares war on Germany and Italy
1942	January 30 – Mary is co-founder of the Society of Independent Motion Picture Producers (Note: Other who founded this society were Charlie Chaplin, Orson Welles, Walt Disney, David O Selznick, Samuel Goldwyn, Alexander Korda, and Walter Wanger)	June 4 - Premiere of Mrs. Miniver starring Greer Garson; November 26 – Premiere of Casablanca starring Humphrey Bogart	February 19 – President Roosevelt signs an executive order directing the internment of Japanese Americans and the seizure of their property; May 14 – Aaron Copland's classical composition Lincoln Portrait is performed for the first time; May 29 – Bing Crosby records Irving Berlin's "White Christmas"
1943	May 2 – Mary and Buddy adopt a son, Ronald Charles Pickford Rogers	February 5 – Release of The Outlaw, produced by Howard Hughes and starring Jane Russell	March 31 – Rodgers and Hammerstein's Oklahoma! opens on Broadway; August 2 – PT-109, under the command of Lieutenant (j.g.) John F. Kennedy, is rammed by a destroyer
1944	January – Mary and Buddy adopt a daughter, Roxanne Rogers; July – Mary negotiates unsuccessfully with Oscar Serlin for film rights to the play Life With Father, planning to star in the film with William Powell	November 22 – Premiere of Meet Me in St. Louis starring Judy Garland	June 6 – The Normandy landings (pictured) begin
1945	Mary launches Comet Pictures with her husband, Charles "Buddy" Rogers, and Columbia Pictures's Ralph Cohn	September 28 - Premiere of Mildred Pierce starring Joan Crawford; November 16 – Release of The Lost Weekend starring Ray Milland	April 12 – President Roosevelt dies; Vice President Harry S. Truman becomes the 33rd president; May 8 – The Allies accept the surrender of Germany; August 6 and 9 – The Atomic bombings of Hiroshima and Nagasaki, respectively, occur; August 14 (August 15 in Japan) – Japan surrenders
1946	October 20 – Release of Little Iodine, a Comet Production; December 13 – Release of Susie Steps Out, a Comet Production	November 21 – Premiere of William Wyler's The Best Years of Our Lives starring Myrna Loy and Fredric March; December 20 – Premiere of Frank Capra's It's a Wonderful Life, starring James Stewart	August 15 – DuMont Television Network begins regular broadcasts
1947	May 9 – Release of The Adventures of Don Coyote, a Comet Production filmed in Cinecolor; June 21 – Release of Stork Bites Man, a Comet Production	August 13 –Premiere of Life with Father starring William Powell and Irene Dunne	
1947	May 9 – Release of The Adventures of Don Coyote, a Comet Production filmed in Cinecolor; June 21 – Release of Stork Bites Man, a Comet Production	November 24 – The United States House of Representatives of the 80th Congress voted 346 to 17 to approve citations for contempt of Congress against the "Hollywood Ten"	
1948	February 18 – Release of Sleep, My Love, directed by Douglas Sirk and produced by Mary, her husband, Buddy, and Ralph Cohn; The British film White Cradle Inn is bought by Mary for release in the United States by United Artists under the title High Fury	July 23 – D. W. Griffith dies in Hollywood, California; August 26 – Premiere of Red River, directed by Howard Hawks and starring John Wayne	August 25 – The House Un-American Activities Committee holds a televised congressional hearing, featuring "Confrontation Day" between Whittaker Chambers and Alger Hiss
1949	Mary, Buddy, and Malcolm Boyd form PRB (Pickford-Rogers-Boyd), a radio and television production company based in New York City; October 12 – Premiere of Love Happy starring the Marx Brothers; the final film produced by Mary Pickford; Mary's painting, "Flowers", debuts at a "famous amateurs" show in New York.	June 8 – The California Senate Factfinding Subcommittee on Un-American Activities releases a 709-page report accusing a number of prominent writers and entertainers of following "the Communist party line program over a long period of time." (Note: Among the hundreds of persons listed were Pearl S. Buck, Charlie Chaplin, Helen Gahagan Douglas, Lillian Hellman, Katharine Hepburn, Thomas Mann, Dashiell Hammett, Danny Kaye, Gene Kelly, Fredric March, Dorothy Parker and Orson Welles)	
1950		February 15 - Premiere of Walt Disney’s Cinderella; August 10 – Premiere of Sunset Blvd. starring Gloria Swanson	February 9 – SenatorJoseph McCarthy accuses the U.S. State Department of being filled with 205 Communists; June 27 – President Harry S. Truman orders American military forces to aid in the defense of South Korea

=== 1951–1979 ===
Year	Pickford	Cinema	United States
1951	February – Mary and Charlie Chaplin hand over the reins of United Artists Corporation to lawyers	October 4 – Premiere of An American in Paris, directed by Vincente Minnelli and starring Gene Kelly	March 29 – Ethel and Julius Rosenberg are convicted of conspiracy to commit espionage
1952		January 10 – Premiere of Cecil B. DeMille's The Greatest Show on Earth	
1952	February 15 – New management takes over at United Artists with Arthur B. Krim, Robert Benjamin and Matty Fox now in charge		
1952		September 19 – While sailing on the RMS Queen Elizabeth to attend the London premiere of his film Limelight, Charlie Chaplin learns that his U.S. re-entry permit had been rescinded	
1952			September 23 – Republican vice presidential candidate Richard Nixon gives his Checkers speech; November 4 – Dwight D. Eisenhower is elected President of the United States
1953	March 19 – Mary appears on television at the 25th Academy Awards, handing Cecil B DeMille his award for The Greatest Show on Earth	September 16 – Premiere of The Robe, the first motion picture shot in the CinemaScope process	June 19 – Julius and Ethel Rosenberg are executed at Sing Sing
1954	March–June – Mary's own version of her life story is published serially in issues of McCall's magazine; these articles will serve as the basis for Sunshine and Shadow, her autobiography published in 1955	September 29 – Premiere of A Star is Born starring Judy Garland	March 9 – On his program See It Now, TV journalist Edward R. Murrow (pictured) comments harshly about Senator Joseph McCarthy; December 2 – Senator McCarthy is censured by the United States Senate
1955	November 19 – Mary is among the first recipients of the George Eastman Award for her contributions to the silent film era (Note: The other recipients were actors Richard Barthelmess, Charlie Chaplin, Ronald Colman, Lillian Gish, Buster Keaton, Harold Lloyd, Mae Marsh, Gloria Swanson, and Norma Talmadge, directors Frank Borzage, Cecil B. DeMille, John Ford, Henry King, and Marshall Neilan, and cinematographers Arthur Edeson, Lee Garmes, Charles Rosher, Hal Rosson, and John Seitz)	March – Charlie Chaplin sells his remaining stock in United Artists; May 4 - Premiere of Daddy Long Legs starring Fred Astaire and Leslie Caron; October 27 – Premiere of Rebel Without a Cause starring James Dean (Note: Dean was killed in a car accident on September 30, 1955.)	April 12 – Jonas Salk's polio vaccine receives full approval by the Food and Drug Administration
1956	February – Mary sells her shares in United Artists for $3 million, marking the departure of the last original founder from the company; Mary establishes the Mary Pickford Charitable Trust, which will later be renamed the Mary Pickford Foundation	November 8 – Premiere of The Ten Commandments, the final film directed by Cecil B. DeMille	January 17 – Release of the single "Heartbreak Hotel" by Elvis Presley; June 29 – President Eisenhower signs the Federal Aid Highway Act, creating the Interstate Highway System
1958		October 27 – Mary's friend and frequent director, Marshall Neilan, dies from throat cancer	July 29 – The U.S. Congress formally creates NASA
1961			January 20 – John F. Kennedy is inaugurated as the 35th president of the United States; April 16 – The Bay of Pigs invasion occurs
1963		August 24 – James Kirkwood, another close friend and former director, dies at age 88	November 22 – President Kennedy is assassinated in Dallas, Texas; December 26 – Capitol Records releases the single "I Want to Hold Your Hand" by The Beatles
1965	October – The Cinémathèque Française holds a Mary Pickford retrospective celebrating her films; Mary travels to Paris for the event	March 2 – Premiere of The Sound of Music starring Julie Andrews	August 30 – Release of the album Highway 61 Revisited by Bob Dylan
1971	May – LACMA sponsors a worldwide celebration of Mary's body of work, with simultaneous screenings of her films in cities across the globe	December 21 – Release of Dirty Harry starring Clint Eastwood	January 12 – All in the Family, starring Carroll O'Connor, debuts on CBS
1973	May 27 – The Ontario Heritage Foundation erects a bust (pictured) and plaque honoring Mary near her Toronto birthplace	December 25 – Release of The Sting starring Paul Newman and Robert Redford	January 27 – Paris Peace Accords is signed
1976	March 29 – Mary receives an Honorary Academy Award for her contribution to motion pictures (Note: "To Mary Pickford in recognition of her unique contributions to the film industry and the development of film as an artistic medium.")		November 2 – Jimmy Carter is elected President of the United States
1977		December 25 – Charlie Chaplin dies at his home, Manoir de Ban, in Riviera-Pays-d'Enhaut District, Vaud, Switzerland	
1979	May 29 – Mary Pickford dies at Santa Monica Hospital following a stroke; May 31 – Mary's funeral is held at the Wee Kirk o' the Heather chapel in Forest Lawn Cemetery in Glendale, California; October 8 – The Academy of Motion Picture Arts and Sciences holds a tribute to Mary	December 5 – Premiere of Kramer vs. Kramer starring Dustin Hoffman and Meryl Streep	November 4 – The Iran hostage crisis begins

=== 1980–present ===
Afterwards
- September 19, 1980 – Charles "Buddy" Rogers sells Pickfair to Jerry Buss
- January 1988 – Pickfair is bought by Pia Zadora and her husband, Meshulam Riklis
- April 1990 – Pickfair is demolished
- December 1991 – The Poor Little Rich Girl (1917) is added to the National Film Registry
- April 21, 1999 – Charles "Buddy" Rogers dies
- May 7, 2000 – Douglas Fairbanks Jr. dies
- December 2006 – Tess of the Storm Country is added to the National Film Registry
