= Mary Pickford filmography =

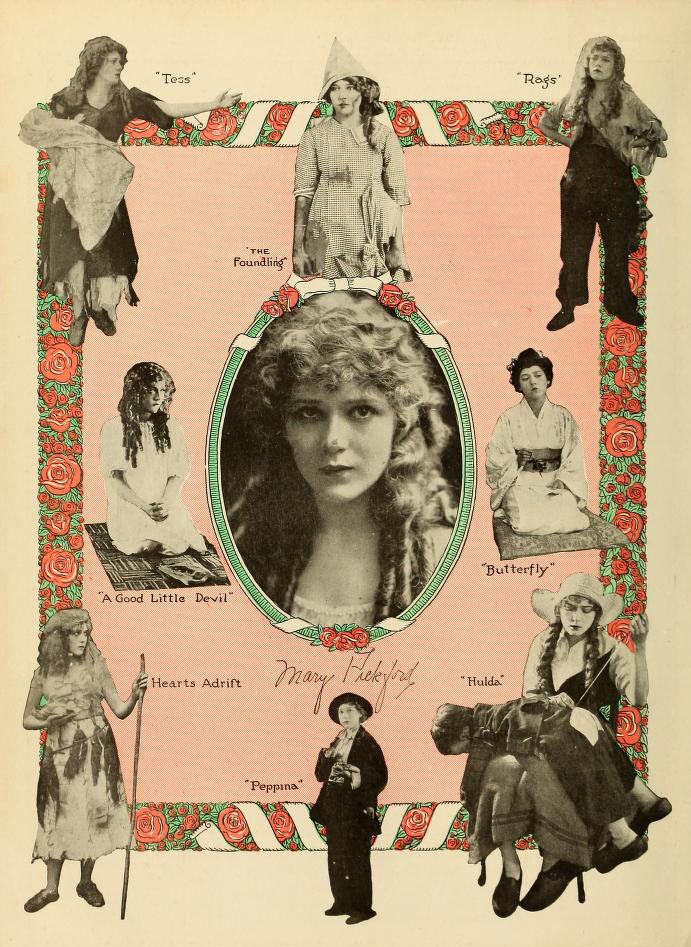
Advertisement, 1916.

Mary Pickford (1892–1979) was a Canadian-American motion picture actress, producer, and writer. During the silent film era she became one of the first great celebrities of the cinema and a popular icon known to the public as "America's Sweetheart". (Note: "Calling Mary 'America's Sweetheart' was not exactly a stroke of genius. I was simply putting down in two words what everyone in America seemed to be thinking about her." — B.P. Schulberg, publicist for Famous Players and scenario writer for In the Bishop's Carriage (1913) and Tess of the Storm Country (1914))

Pickford was born Gladys Louise Smith in Toronto and began acting on stage in 1900. She started her film career in the United States in 1909. Initially with the Biograph film company, she moved to the Independent Motion Picture Company (IMP) in 1911, then briefly to the Majestic Film Company later that same year, followed by a return to Biograph in 1912. After appearing in over 150 short films during her years with these studios, she began working in features with Zukor's Famous Players Film Company, a studio which eventually became part of Paramount Pictures. By 1916, Pickford's popularity had climbed to the point that she was awarded a contract that made her a partner with Zukor and allowed her to produce her own films. In 1919, Pickford teamed with D.W. Griffith, Charlie Chaplin, and Douglas Fairbanks to create United Artists, an organization designed to distribute their own films. Following the release of Secrets in 1933, Pickford retired from acting in motion pictures. However, she remained active as a producer for several years afterwards. She sold her stock in United Artists in 1956.

Pickford won two Academy Awards in her lifetime. The first was in 1929 when she won the award for Best Actress for her performance in Coquette. The second was in 1975 when she was presented with an Honorary Academy Award "in recognition of her unique contributions to the film industry and the development of film as an artistic medium". As of 2026 three of Pickford's films have been added to the National Film Registry: Tess of the Storm Country (1914), The Poor Little Rich Girl (1917), and Sparrows (1926).

For her work in motion pictures, Pickford received a star on the Hollywood Walk of Fame located at 6280 Hollywood Boulevard.

Unless otherwise referenced, the information presented here is derived from the web site of the American Film Institute, the filmography prepared by Library of Congress historian Christel Schmidt, and the books Mary Pickford Rediscovered by Kevin Brownlow, Mary Pickford: From Here to Hollywood by Scott Eyman, and Pickford: The Woman Who Made Hollywood by Eileen Whitfield.

"The best known woman who has ever lived, the woman who was known to more people and loved by more people than any other woman that has been in all history."

— Adela Rogers St. Johns, 1981

== Short films ==
=== Biograph (1909) ===
Mary Pickford began working for the American Mutoscope and Biograph Company in April 1909 and remained with the company until the end of 1910. During this period, Pickford made 43 films released in 1909, plus a 44th film that was not released. Most of these films are one-reelers while the remaining films are split-reelers (one of two films released on the same reel).

Release date	Title	Credited as				Director	Notes
Release date	Title	Writer	Producer	Actress	Role	Director	Notes
May 24, 1909	Two Memories			Yes	Marion's sister	D. W. Griffith	Split-reel
May 31, 1909	His Duty			Yes	One of the children on the street	D. W. Griffith	Split-reel
June 7, 1909	The Violin Maker of Cremona			Yes	Giannina, Taddeo's Daughter	D. W. Griffith	
June 10, 1909	The Lonely Villa			Yes	One of the Cullison Children	D. W. Griffith	Split-reel
June 14, 1909	The Son's Return			Yes	Mary Clark	D. W. Griffith	
June 17, 1909	Faded Lilies			Yes	Girl at Party	D. W. Griffith	Split-reel
June 17, 1909	Her First Biscuits			Yes	Biscuit Victim	D. W. Griffith	Split-reel; The first film that Pickford made
June 24, 1909	The Peach-Basket Hat			Yes	Woman on the Street and in Store	D. W. Griffith	Split-reel
June 28, 1909	The Way of Man			Yes	Winnie, Mabel's Cousin	D. W. Griffith	
July 1, 1909	The Necklace			Yes	The Maid in the Pawnshop	D. W. Griffith	
July 8, 1909	The Country Doctor			Yes	Poor Mother's Elder Daughter	D. W. Griffith	
July 12, 1909	The Cardinal's Conspiracy			Yes	The Señorita	D. W. Griffith	
July 15, 1909	Tender Hearts			Yes	Nellie	D. W. Griffith	Split-reel
July 19, 1909	The Renunciation			Yes	Kittie Ryan	D. W. Griffith	
July 22, 1909	Sweet and Twenty			Yes	Alice	D. W. Griffith	Split-reel
July 29, 1909	The Slave			Yes	A Young Girl at Court	D. W. Griffith	
August 9, 1909	They Would Elope			Yes	Bessie	D. W. Griffith	
August 19, 1909	His Wife's Visitor			Yes	Bessie Wright	D. W. Griffith	
August 23, 1909	The Indian Runner's Romance			Yes	Blue Cloud's Wife	D. W. Griffith	
August 26, 1909	Oh, Uncle!			Yes	Bessie	D. W. Griffith	Split-reel
August 26, 1909	The Seventh Day			Yes	The Maid	D. W. Griffith	Split-reel
September 2, 1909	The Little Darling			Yes	The Little Darling	D. W. Griffith	
September 2, 1909	The Sealed Room			Yes	A Lady-in-Waiting	D. W. Griffith	
September 6, 1909	The Hessian Renegades			Yes	A member of the soldier's family	D. W. Griffith	
September 13, 1909	Getting Even	Yes		Yes	Miss Lucy	D. W. Griffith	Split-reel
September 16, 1909	The Broken Locket			Yes	Ruth King	D. W. Griffith	
September 20, 1909	In Old Kentucky			Yes	Homecoming Party	D. W. Griffith	
September 30, 1909	The Awakening	Yes		Yes	The Widow's Daughter	D. W. Griffith	
October 11, 1909	The Little Teacher			Yes	The Little Teacher	D. W. Griffith	
October 18, 1909	His Lost Love			Yes	Mary	D. W. Griffith	
October 25, 1909	In the Watches of the Night			Yes	Girl at Brainard's	D. W. Griffith	
October 28, 1909	Lines of White on a Sullen Sea			Yes	Second Couple	D. W. Griffith	
November 1, 1909	The Gibson Goddess			Yes	Girl on Sidewalk	D. W. Griffith	Split-reel
November 1, 1909	What's Your Hurry?			Yes	Mary	D. W. Griffith	Split-reel
November 8, 1909	The Restoration			Yes	Alice Ashford	D. W. Griffith	
November 11, 1909	The Light That Came			Yes	Vivian and Daisy	D. W. Griffith	
November 18, 1909	A Midnight Adventure			Yes	Eleanor	D. W. Griffith	Split-reel
November 25, 1909	The Mountaineer's Honor			Yes	Harum-Scarum, a Mountain Girl	D. W. Griffith	
November 29, 1909	The Trick That Failed			Yes	Nellie Burt	D. W. Griffith	Split-reel
December 6, 1909	Through the Breakers			Yes	An extra	D. W. Griffith	
December 16, 1909	The Test			Yes	Bessie	D. W. Griffith	
December 27, 1909	To Save Her Soul			Yes	Agnes Hailey	D. W. Griffith	
December 30, 1909	The Day After	Yes				D. W. Griffith	Split-reel
December 31, 1909	The Heart of an Outlaw			Yes	The Outlaw's Daughter	D. W. Griffith	

=== Biograph (1910) ===
Pickford appeared in 34 Biograph films released in 1910. All of these films are one-reelers.

Release date	Title	Credited as				Director	Notes
Release date	Title	Writer	Producer	Actress	Role	Director	Notes
January 15, 1910	All on Account of the Milk			Yes	The Young Woman	Frank Powell	
February 3, 1910	The Woman from Mellon's			Yes	Mary Petersby, the Daughter	D. W. Griffith	
February 17, 1910	The Englishman and the Girl			Yes	The Girl	D. W. Griffith	Lost
March 3, 1910	The Newlyweds			Yes	Alice Vance	D. W. Griffith	
March 7, 1910	The Thread of Destiny			Yes	Myrtle	D. W. Griffith	
March 24, 1910	The Twisted Trail			Yes	Molly Hendricks	D. W. Griffith	
March 31, 1910	The Smoker			Yes	George's Wife	Frank Powell	
April 4, 1910	As It Is In Life			Yes	George Forrester's Daughter, as an Adult	D. W. Griffith	
April 7, 1910	A Rich Revenge			Yes	Jennie	D. W. Griffith	
April 11, 1910	A Romance of the Western Hills			Yes	Indian	D. W. Griffith	
May 5, 1910	The Unchanging Sea			Yes	The Daughter as an Adult	D. W. Griffith	
May 9, 1910	Love Among the Roses			Yes	The Lacemaker	D. W. Griffith	
May 12, 1910	The Two Brothers			Yes	A Mexican	D. W. Griffith	
May 23, 1910	Ramona			Yes	Ramona	D. W. Griffith	Based on the novel by Helen Hunt Jackson
June 2, 1910	In the Season of Buds			Yes	Mabel	D. W. Griffith	
June 9, 1910	A Victim of Jealousy			Yes	The Wife's Friend	D. W. Griffith	
June 20, 1910	Never Again			Yes	The Girl	Frank Powell	
June 20, 1910	May and December	Yes		Yes	May	Frank Powell	
June 27, 1910	A Child's Impulse			Yes	Grace	D. W. Griffith	
June 30, 1910	Muggsy's First Sweetheart			Yes	Mabel Brown	D. W. Griffith	
July 11, 1910	What the Daisy Said			Yes	Martha	D. W. Griffith	
July 25, 1910	The Call to Arms			Yes	A Messenger	D. W. Griffith	Unique male role of her career
August 1, 1910	An Arcadian Maid			Yes	Priscilla	D. W. Griffith	
August 15, 1910	When We Were In Our Teens			Yes	Mary	Frank Powell	
August 22, 1910	The Sorrows of the Unfaithful			Yes	Mary	D. W. Griffith	
August 25, 1910	Wilful Peggy			Yes	Peggy	D. W. Griffith	
September 1, 1910	Muggsy Becomes a Hero			Yes	Mabel	Frank Powell	
October 6, 1910	A Gold Necklace			Yes	Mazie	Frank Powell	
October 13, 1910	The Lucky Toothache			Yes	Bessie	Frank Powell	
November 5, 1910	Waiter No. 5			Yes	The Chief of Police's Son's Fiancée	D. W. Griffith	
November 14, 1910	Simple Charity			Yes	Miss Wilkins	D. W. Griffith	
November 21, 1910	The Song of the Wildwood Flute			Yes	Dove Eyes	D. W. Griffith	
November 28, 1910	A Plain Song			Yes	Edith	D. W. Griffith	
December 22, 1910	White Roses			Yes	Betty	Frank Powell	

=== Biograph (1911) ===
Pickford left the Biograph Company at the end of 1910. The last films that she made for them before her departure were released in early 1911. All of these five films are one-reelers.

Release date	Title	Credited as				Director	Notes
Release date	Title	Writer	Producer	Actress	Role	Director	Notes
January 5, 1911	When A Man Loves			Yes	Tessie	D. W. Griffith	
January 9, 1911	The Italian Barber			Yes	Alice	D. W. Griffith	
February 2, 1911	Three Sisters			Yes	Mary	D. W. Griffith	
March 6, 1911	A Decree of Destiny			Yes	Mary	D. W. Griffith	
August 17, 1911	Madame Rex	Yes				D. W. Griffith	

=== Selig (1911) ===
In a 1913 interview Pickford claimed to have written two screenplays for the Selig Polyscope Company. Neither film is known to survive.

Release date	Title	Credited as				Director	Notes
Release date	Title	Writer	Producer	Actress	Role	Director	Notes
March 3, 1911	The Medallion	Yes				(unknown)	Lost
July 31, 1911	Caught in the Act	Yes				(unknown)	Lost

=== IMP (1911–1912) ===
In December 1910 Carl Laemmle signed Pickford to his Independent Motion Picture Company (IMP). All of her IMP titles are one-reelers. The names of Pickford's characters are given if known. Only 13 of Pickford's 41 IMP films are known to survive complete, while fragments of two others exist.

Release date	Title	Credited as				Director	Notes
Release date	Title	Writer	Producer	Actress	Role	Director	Notes
January 9, 1911	Their First Misunderstanding	Yes		Yes	Mae Darcy	Thomas Ince	Extant, apart from the first minute
January 23, 1911	The Dream	Yes		Yes	The Wife	Thomas Ince; George Loane Tucker	preserved; Library of Congress
January 30, 1911	Maid or Man			Yes	Jimmie's sister	Thomas Ince	
February 9, 1911	The Mirror			Yes	Dorothy	Thomas Ince	
February 9, 1911	When The Cat's Away			Yes	Dorothy, the wife	Thomas Ince	
February 13, 1911	Her Darkest Hour			Yes	Ruth	Thomas Ince	Lost
February 16, 1911	The Convert			Yes	Agnes Boyd	Thomas Ince	Lost
February 23, 1911	Artful Kate			Yes	Artful Kate Stanley	Thomas Ince	preserved; Library of Congress
February 27, 1911	A Manly Man			Yes	Walk-on	Thomas Ince	
March 6, 1911	Tracked			Yes	Unknown role	Thomas Ince	Lost
March 9, 1911	The Message in the Bottle			Yes	Walk-on	Thomas Ince	Lost
March 13, 1911	The Secret of the Palm			Yes	Unknown role	Thomas Ince	Lost
March 16, 1911	The Fisher-Maid			Yes	Paula, the Fisher-Maid	Thomas Ince	Lost
March 20, 1911	In Old Madrid			Yes	Walk-on	Thomas Ince	
March 27, 1911	Sweet Memories			Yes	Polly Biblett	Thomas Ince	preserved at the Library of Congress
April 17, 1911	The Stampede			Yes	Nello, the Bandit's Daughter	Thomas Ince	Lost
April 24, 1911	While There Is Hope, There Is Life			Yes	Unknown role	Thomas Ince	Lost
May 1, 1911	Second Sight			Yes	Gertrude Edgar	Thomas Ince	Lost
May 8, 1911	The Fair Dentist			Yes	Edith Morton	Thomas Ince	Lost
May 11, 1911	For Her Brother's Sake			Yes	Madge Spotwood	Thomas Ince	Lost
May 15, 1911	The Master and the Man			Yes	Elsie Graham	Thomas Ince	Lost
May 18, 1911	The Lighthouse Keeper			Yes	Polly Berry, the Lighthouse Keeper's Daughter	Thomas Ince	
June 8, 1911	Back to the Soil			Yes	Sadie Allen	Thomas Ince	Lost
July 3, 1911	In the Sultan's Garden			Yes	Haidee	Thomas Ince	
July 6, 1911	For the Queen's Honor			Yes	Princess Gilda	Thomas Ince	Lost
July 10, 1911	A Gasoline Engagement			Yes	Flora Powell	Thomas Ince	Lost
July 13, 1911	At a Quarter of Two			Yes	Mrs. Warren	Thomas Ince	Fragment survives
July 24, 1911	Science			Yes	Mrs. Crawford	Thomas Ince	Lost
July 31, 1911	The Skating Bug			Yes	The Girl	Thomas Ince	Lost
August 13, 1911	The Call of the Song			Yes	Amy Gordon	Thomas Ince	Lost
August 24, 1911	As a Boy Dreams			Yes	The Girl	Thomas Ince	
August 31, 1911	The Toss of a Coin			Yes	Alice Barton, the Farmer's Daughter	Thomas Ince	Lost
September 29, 1911	'Tween Two Loves			Yes	Grace	Thomas Ince	
October 2, 1911	The Rose's Story			Yes	Unknown role	Thomas Ince	Lost
October 9, 1911	The Sentinel Asleep			Yes	Unknown role	Thomas Ince	Lost
October 12, 1911	The Better Way			Yes	Lilian Garvey, a Salvation Army Lass	Thomas Ince	Lost
October 30, 1911	His Dress Shirt			Yes	Mrs. Kirby	Thomas Ince	Lost
December 28, 1911	The Portrait			Yes	Little Vera, the Model		
1911 (exact date unknown)	How Mary Fixed It			Yes	Mary		
March 11, 1912	A Timely Repentance			Yes	Heroine of the Movie Within the Movie, The Wife's Desertion	Thomas Ince	Fragment survives

=== Majestic (1911–1912) ===
After leaving IMP, Pickford signed with Harry H. Aiken's Majestic Film Company. During her brief time with this studio she made five one-reelers. Only one of these films is known to survive.

Release date	Title	Credited as				Director	Notes
Release date	Title	Writer	Producer	Actress	Role	Director	Notes
November 25, 1911	The Courting of Mary			Yes	Mary	George Loane Tucker	Lost
December 3, 1911	Love Heeds Not the Showers			Yes	Unknown role	Owen Moore	Lost
December 17, 1911	Little Red Riding Hood			Yes	Little Red Riding Hood	Owen Moore	
December 31, 1911	The Caddy's Dream			Yes	Unknown role	Owen Moore	Lost
February 9, 1912	Honor Thy Father			Yes	Mary Fuller	Owen Moore	Lost

=== Biograph (1912–1913) ===
Pickford returned to the Biograph Company in January 1912, where she remained until the end of the year. Except where noted all 26 films from this period are one-reelers.

Release date	Title	Credited as				Director	Notes
Release date	Title	Writer	Producer	Actress	Role	Director	Notes
February 15, 1912	The Mender of Nets			Yes	The Net-Mender	D. W. Griffith	
March 11, 1912	A Timely Repentance			Yes	The Movie Heroine	D. W. Griffith	
March 14, 1912	Iola's Promise			Yes	Iola	D. W. Griffith	
April 8, 1912	Fate's Interception			Yes	The Mexican Girl	D. W. Griffith	
April 15, 1912	The Female of the Species			Yes	The Miner's Wife's Sister	D. W. Griffith	
April 18, 1912	Just Like a Woman			Yes	The Young Woman	D. W. Griffith	
April 22, 1912	Won By a Fish			Yes	The Woman	Mack Sennett	
May 6, 1912	The Old Actor			Yes	The Old Actor's Daughter	D. W. Griffith	
May 9, 1912	A Lodging for the Night			Yes	The Mexican Girl	D. W. Griffith	
May 27, 1912	A Beast at Bay			Yes	The Young Woman	D. W. Griffith	
June 6, 1912	Home Folks			Yes	The Young Woman	D. W. Griffith	
June 17, 1912	Lena and the Geese	Yes		Yes	Lena	D. W. Griffith	
June 27, 1912	The School Teacher and the Waif			Yes	Nora, the Waif	D. W. Griffith	
July 8, 1912	An Indian Summer			Yes	The Widow's Daughter	D. W. Griffith	
August 1, 1912	The Narrow Road			Yes	Mrs. Jim Holcomb	D. W. Griffith	
August 12, 1912	The Inner Circle			Yes	The Rich Italian's Daughter	D. W. Griffith	
August 19, 1912	With the Enemy's Help			Yes	Faro Kate	Wilfred Lucas	
August 29, 1912	A Pueblo Legend			Yes	The Indian Girl	D. W. Griffith	Two reels
September 23, 1912	Friends			Yes	Dora (the orphan)	D. W. Griffith	Contains what Mary Pickford believes to be the first closeup shot in all of cinema (of herself)
September 30, 1912	So Near, yet So Far			Yes	The Young Woman	D. W. Griffith	
October 3, 1912	A Feud in the Kentucky Hills			Yes	The Daughter	D. W. Griffith	
October 21, 1912	The One She Loved			Yes	The Wife	D. W. Griffith	
November 14, 1912	My Baby			Yes	The Wife	D. W. Griffith	
November 21, 1912	The Informer			Yes	The Confederate Captain's Sweetheart	D. W. Griffith	
December 6, 1912	The New York Hat			Yes	Miss Mollie Goodhue (the girl)	D. W. Griffith	The last film that Pickford made for Biograph
March 15, 1913	The Unwelcome Guest			Yes	The Slavey	D. W. Griffith	

== Features ==
=== State rights (1913–1914) ===
After leaving Biograph at the end of 1912, Pickford returned to stage acting in the Broadway production of David Belasco's play A Good Little Devil. In May 1913 she resumed acting in motion pictures when she signed with Adolph Zukor's Famous Players Film Company. The first five features she made for Zukor were released in the United States on a state rights basis, where regional organizations in each state handled the distribution of each film. Only one of these films is known to survive complete.

Release date	Title	Credited as				Director	Notes
Release date	Title	Writer	Producer	Actress	Role	Director	Notes
September 10, 1913	In the Bishop's Carriage			Yes	Nance Olden	Edwin S. Porter	Lost
November 10, 1913	Caprice			Yes	Mercy Baxter	J. Searle Dawley	Lost
February 10, 1914	Hearts Adrift			Yes	Nina	Edwin S. Porter	Lost
March 1, 1914	A Good Little Devil			Yes	Juliet	Edwin S. Porter	incomplete; One reel survives
March 30, 1914	Tess of the Storm Country			Yes	Tessibel Skinner	Edwin S. Porter	

=== Paramount (1914–1916) ===
In 1914 Paramount Pictures began handling the release of Zukor's Famous Players Film Company. Pickford made 17 features prior to beginning with Artcraft. Thirteen of these films survive, while four are lost.

Release date	Title	Credited as				Director	Notes
Release date	Title	Writer	Producer	Actress	Role	Director	Notes
July 1, 1914	The Eagle's Mate			Yes	Anemone Breckenridge	James Kirkwood	
August 26, 1914	Behind the Scenes			Yes	Dolly Lane	James Kirkwood	
September 21, 1914	Such a Little Queen			Yes	Queen Anna Victoria	Hugh Ford	Lost
December 28, 1914	Cinderella			Yes	Cinderella	James Kirkwood	
February 1, 1915	Mistress Nell			Yes	Mistress Nell	James Kirkwood	
May 10, 1915	Fanchon the Cricket			Yes	Fanchon, the cricket	James Kirkwood	Complete print found in 2012.
June 7, 1915	The Dawn of a Tomorrow			Yes	Glad	James Kirkwood	
July 1, 1915	Little Pal			Yes	"Little Pal"	James Kirkwood	
August 2, 1915	Rags			Yes	Rags / Alice McCloud	James Kirkwood	
September 6, 1915	Esmeralda			Yes	Esmerelda Rogers	James Kirkwood	Lost
October 7, 1915	A Girl of Yesterday	Yes		Yes	Jane Stuart	Allan Dwan	Lost
November 8, 1915	Madame Butterfly			Yes	Cho-Cho-San	Sidney Olcott	
Unreleased	The Foundling			Yes	Molly O	Allan Dwan	Lost; negative destroyed in a studio fire.
January 2, 1916	The Foundling			Yes	Molly O	John B. O'Brien	
March 2, 1916	Poor Little Peppina			Yes	Peppina	Sidney Olcott	
April 17, 1916	The Eternal Grind			Yes	Louise	John B. O'Brien	
July 31, 1916	Hulda from Holland			Yes	Hulda	John B. O'Brien	

=== Artcraft (1916–1918) ===
Pickford signed a new contract with Adolph Zukor in June 1916. Among the agreements in the contract was that she would now be producing her own films and they would be distributed through a special division of Paramount Pictures called Artcraft. Pickford made 13 films for Artcraft of which 11 survive complete.

Release date	Title	Credited as				Director	Notes
Release date	Title	Writer	Producer	Actress	Role	Director	Notes
November 2, 1916	Less Than the Dust		Yes	Yes	Radha	John Emerson	
January 8, 1917	The Pride of the Clan		Yes	Yes	Marget MacTavish	Maurice Tourneur	
March 5, 1917	The Poor Little Rich Girl		Yes	Yes	Gwendolyn	Maurice Tourneur	
May 14, 1917	A Romance of the Redwoods		Yes	Yes	Jenny Lawrence	Cecil B. DeMille	
July 2, 1917	The Little American		Yes	Yes	Angela Moore	Cecil B. DeMille	
September 3, 1917	Rebecca of Sunnybrook Farm		Yes	Yes	Rebecca Randall	Marshall Neilan	
November 12, 1917	A Little Princess		Yes	Yes	Sara Crewe	Marshall Neilan	
January 21, 1918	Stella Maris		Yes	Yes	Miss Stella Maris / Unity Blake	Marshall Neilan	
March 10, 1918	Amarilly of Clothes-Line Alley		Yes	Yes	Amarilly Jenkins	Marshall Neilan	
May 12, 1918	M'Liss		Yes	Yes	Melissa "M'liss" Smith	Marshall Neilan	
June 23, 1918	How Could You, Jean?		Yes	Yes	Jean Mackaye	William Desmond Taylor	Lost
September 15, 1918	Johanna Enlists		Yes	Yes	Johanna Renssaller	William Desmond Taylor	
April 21, 1919	Captain Kidd, Jr.		Yes	Yes	Mary MacTavish	William Desmond Taylor	Incomplete print survives

=== War propaganda (1917–1918) ===
During World War I Pickford appeared in four short propaganda films.

Release date	Title	Credited as				Director	Notes
Release date	Title	Writer	Producer	Actress	Role	Director	Notes
October 1917	All-Star Production of Patriotic Episodes for the Second Liberty Loan			Yes	Herself	Marshall Neilan	
October 5, 1918	100% American			Yes	Mayme	Arthur Rosson	Released in Canada under the title 100% Canadian.
November 1, 1918	United States Fourth Liberty Loan Drive			Yes	Herself	Frank Lloyd	
November 1918	Canadian Victory Loan Drive			Yes	Herself		

=== First National (1918–1920) ===
In November 1918, Pickford ended her contractual obligations with Adolph Zukor and Paramount. She then signed a three-picture deal with First National to distribute her productions.

Release date	Title	Credited as				Director	Notes
Release date	Title	Writer	Producer	Actress	Role	Director	Notes
May 12, 1919	Daddy-Long-Legs		Yes	Yes	Jerusha "Judy" Abbott	Marshall Neilan	
September 1, 1919	The Hoodlum		Yes	Yes	Amy Burke	Sidney Franklin	
December 1, 1919	Heart o' the Hills		Yes	Yes	Mavis Hawn	Sidney Franklin	

=== United Artists (silent films, 1920–1927) ===
In 1919 Pickford co-founded United Artists with Charlie Chaplin, D. W. Griffith, and Douglas Fairbanks. Pickford starred in 11 silent films for United Artists release and co-produced three films starring her brother, Jack Pickford, and one with their sister, Lottie Pickford. Mary Pickford also made unbilled cameo appearances in three other films during this time.

Release date	Title	Credited as				Director	Notes
Release date	Title	Writer	Producer	Actress	Role	Director	Notes
January 18, 1920	Pollyanna		Yes	Yes	Pollyanna Whittier	Paul Powell	A Mary Pickford Production; Released by United Artists
January 27, 1920	Suds		Yes	Yes	Amanda Afflick	John Francis Dillon	A Mary Pickford Production; Released by United Artists
January 9, 1921	The Love Light		Yes	Yes	Angela Carlotti	Frances Marion	A Mary Pickford Production; Released by United Artists
May 17, 1921	Through the Back Door		Yes	Yes	Jeanne	Alfred E. Green; Jack Pickford	A Mary Pickford Production; Released by United Artists
August 17, 1921	They Shall Pay		Yes			Martin Justice	A Playgoer Picture; Released by Associated Exhibitors; Starring Lottie Pickford
September 16, 1921	Little Lord Fauntleroy		Yes	Yes	Cedric Errol / Widow Errol	Alfred E. Green; Jack Pickford	A Mary Pickford Production; Released by United Artists
November 12, 1922	Tess of the Storm Country		Yes	Yes	Tessibel "Tess" Skinner	John S. Robertson	A Mary Pickford Production; Released by United Artists
January 23, 1923	Garrison's Finish	Yes				Arthur Rossen	A Jack Pickford Production; Released by Allied Producers and Distributors
August 19, 1923	Hollywood			Yes	Herself (unbilled cameo)	James Cruze	A Paramount Picture; Lost
September 3, 1923	Rosita		Yes	Yes	Rosita, a street singer	Ernst Lubitsch	A Mary Pickford Production; Released by United Artists
March 15, 1924	The Hill Billy		Yes			George W. Hill	Jack Pickford–Allied Producers and Distributors
May 25, 1924	Dorothy Vernon of Haddon Hall		Yes	Yes	Dorothy Vernon	Marshall Neilan	A Mary Pickford Production; Released by United Artists
March 29, 1925	Waking Up the Town		Yes			James Cruze	A Jack Pickford Production; Released by Allied Producers and Distributors
September 18, 1925	Little Annie Rooney	Yes	Yes	Yes	Annabelle "Little Annie" Rooney	William Beaudine	A Mary Pickford Production; Released by United Artists
March 8, 1926	The Black Pirate			Yes	Billie Dove's kissing stand-in (unbilled cameo)	Albert Parker	An Elton Corporation Production; Released by United Artists; Filmed in Technicolor
September 26, 1926	Sparrows		Yes	Yes	Molly	William Beaudine	A Mary Pickford Production; Released by United Artists
September 9, 1927	A Kiss from Mary Pickford ("Поцелуй Мэри Пикфорд")			Yes	Herself (cameo)	Sergei Komarov	A Mezhrabpom–Rus & Sovkino Production
November 4, 1927	The Gaucho			Yes	Virgin Mary (unbilled cameo)	F. Richard Jones	An Elton Corporation Production; Released by United Artists
November 13, 1927	My Best Girl		Yes	Yes	Maggie Johnson	Sam Taylor	A Mary Pickford Production; Released by United Artists

=== United Artists (sound films, 1929–1949) ===
Pickford starred in four sound films (excluding the uncompleted Forever Yours). After Secrets, her final film as an actress, she continued working as a producer, including two films in collaboration with Jesse L. Lasky. In 1945, she and her third husband, Charles "Buddy" Rogers, co-founded Comet Productions to produce "B" pictures for United Artists. Her role as producer in these later films was generally uncredited.

Release date	Title	Credited as				Director	Notes
Release date	Title	Writer	Producer	Actress	Role	Director	Notes
March 30, 1929	Coquette		Yes	Yes	Norma Besant	Sam Taylor	A Mary Pickford Production; Released by United Artists; Academy Award for Best Actress
October 26, 1929	The Taming of the Shrew		Yes	Yes	Katherine	Sam Taylor	A Mary Pickford and Elton Corporation Production; Released by United Artists
Not released (filmed in 1930)	Forever Yours		Yes	Yes	Mary Carlton / Mary Marlow	Marshall Neilan	A Mary Pickford Production; Not completed; 3½ minutes survive
March 14, 1931	Kiki			Yes	Kiki	Sam Taylor	An Art Cinema Production; Released by United Artists
March 16, 1933	Secrets		Yes	Yes	Mary Carlton / Mary Marlow	Frank Borzage	A Mary Pickford Production; Released by United Artists
May 13, 1936	One Rainy Afternoon		Yes			Rowland V. Lee	A Mary Pickford–Jesse Lasky Production; Released by United Artists
October 2, 1936	The Gay Desperado		Yes			Rouben Mamoulian	A Mary Pickford–Jesse Lasky Production; Released by United Artists
October 20, 1946	Little Iodine		Yes			Reginald LeBorg	A Comet Production; Released by United Artists
December 13, 1946	Susie Steps Out		Yes			Reginald LeBorg	A Comet Production; Released by United Artists
May 9, 1947	The Adventures of Don Coyote		Yes			Reginald LeBorg	A Comet Production; Released by United Artists; Filmed in Cinecolor
June 21, 1947	Stork Bites Man		Yes			Cy Endfield	A Comet Production; Released by United Artists
February 18, 1948	Sleep, My Love		Yes			Douglas Sirk	A Triangle Production; Released by United Artists
November 19, 1948	White Cradle Inn		Yes			Harold French	Peak Films–United Artists
October 12, 1949	Love Happy		Yes			David Miller	An Allied Alliance Production; Released by United Artists

== Cameos and erroneous credits ==
=== Cameo appearances in feature film ===
Pickford made a cameo appearance as herself in the following feature film:

Year	Title	Notes	Ref
1918	Cupid Angling	Starring Ruth Roland; filmed in the Douglass color process, it features cameo appearances by Mary and Douglas Fairbanks	

=== Cameo appearances in short films ===
Pickford made cameo appearances as herself in the following short films:

Year	Title	Ref
1928	Holiday in Mexico	
1933	Hollywood on Parade No. B-10	
1934	Star Night at the Cocoanut Grove	
1941	Picture People No. 3: Hobbies of the Stars	

=== Erroneous credits ===
Three Biograph titles, The Usurer (August 15, 1910), The Affair of an Egg (September 1, 1910), and Examination Day at School (September 2, 1910), and two IMP titles, At the Duke's Command (February 6, 1911) and From the Bottom of the Sea (October 20, 1911), have been erroneously listed in Mary Pickford filmographies. Pickford historian Christel Schmidt has confirmed that the actress does not appear in these films. The Internet Movie Database lists Pickford as appearing in the Biograph shorts entitled Mrs. Jones Entertains (January 9, 1909), The Fascinating Mrs. Francis (January 21, 1909) and The Deception (March 22, 1909). However, Pickford did not begin with Biograph until the end of April 1909. Mary Pickford is credited with appearing in the movie Pictureland in 1911, but a recently discovered copy shows that she is not in the film. The stars are Isabel Rae and King Baggot and the film was likely directed by Thomas Ince.

== See also ==
- Timeline of Mary Pickford

== Bibliography ==
- Brownlow, Kevin (1999). Mary Pickford Rediscovered. Harry N. Abrams. ISBN 978-0-8109-4374-2.
- Neely, Hugh Munro (2008). "Mary Pickford, Filmmaker". The Mary Pickford Institute for Film Education. Archived from the original on November 18, 2009.
- Whitfield, Eileen (1997). Pickford: The Woman Who Made Hollywood. Lexington, Kentucky: University Press of Kentucky. ISBN 0-8131-2045-4.
- Petersen, Anne Helen (2014). Pickford&Fairbanks: American Royalty. Penguin.
