= A Beast at Bay =

1912 film

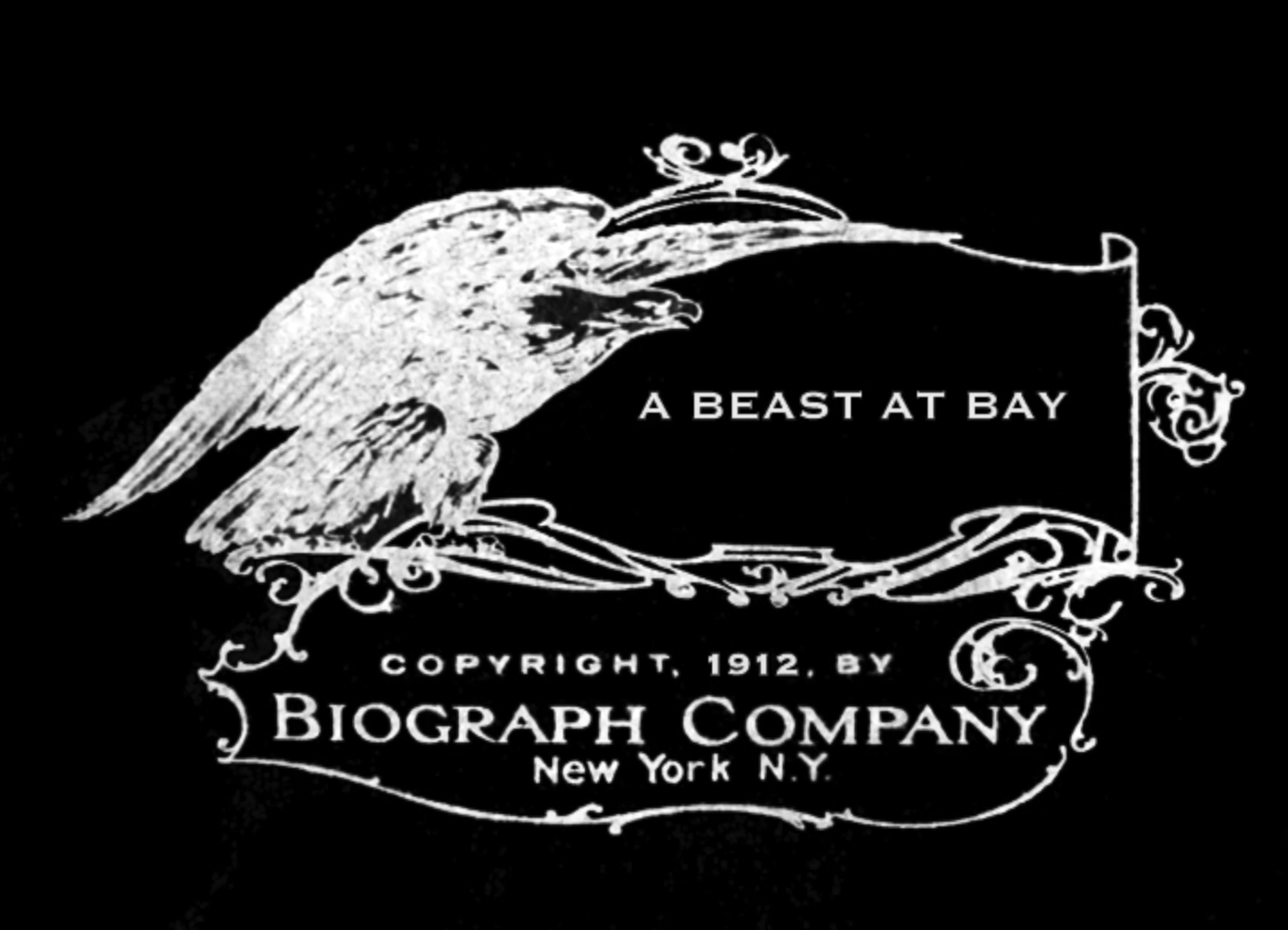
- Title card
- Directed by: D. W. Griffith
- Written by: George Hennessy
- Produced by: Biograph Company
- Starring: Mary Pickford
- Cinematography: G. W. Bitzer
- Distributed by: Biograph Company
- Release date: May 27, 1912
- Running time: 17 minutes; 2 reels
- Country: United States
- Language: Silent (English intertitles)

A Beast at Bay is a 1912 American short silent drama film directed by D. W. Griffith and starring Mary Pickford. It was produced and distributed by the Biograph Company. A paper print is preserved in the Library of Congress.

Full film

== Plot ==
Four armed guards hunt an escaped convict. The fugitive overpowers a lone guard, forces him to exchange clothes, and steals his rifle.

Meanwhile, a young woman and her boyfriend go for a drive. When they stop, a stranger challenges the boyfriend to a fight, but he refuses. The woman calls him a coward to his face, and they part ways.

Later, the convict forces the woman to drive him away in her car. The boyfriend witnesses this through binoculars. Two guards arrive at the train station. Knowing the railroad tracks run parallel to the road, the boyfriend commandeers a train. He and the guards board it and give chase. When the road diverges from the tracks, they continue on foot, splitting up to cover more ground.

The convict abandons the car and takes his captive to an isolated shack. Inside, he menaces her. The boyfriend finds the abandoned car and charges the shack despite gunfire. He breaks in and fights the convict but starts losing. The guards arrive in time to capture the escapee. The woman reconciles with her boyfriend and kisses him.

== Cast ==
- Mary Pickford as The Young Woman
- Edwin August as The Young Woman's Ideal
- Alfred Paget as The Convict
- Mae Marsh as The Young Woman's Friend
- W. Christy Cabanne as Station Master
- William A. Carroll as Guard
- Robert Harron as A Farmer
- J. Jiquel Lanoe as At Station
- Henry Lehrman as Guard
- Charles Hill Mailes as Guard
- Marguerite Marsh (billed as Marguerite Loveridge)
- W. C. Robinson as Guard
- Charles West

According to a source, the Biograph Bulletin synopsis names the hero and heroine Jack and Edith; these same names appear in the Library of Congress summary.

== Production ==
The film was shot in Los Angeles in March 1912. Another source says it was shot in Southern California and completed in March.

== See also ==
- List of American films of 1912
- D. W. Griffith filmography
- Mary Pickford filmography
