= The Inner Circle (1912 film) =

1912 film

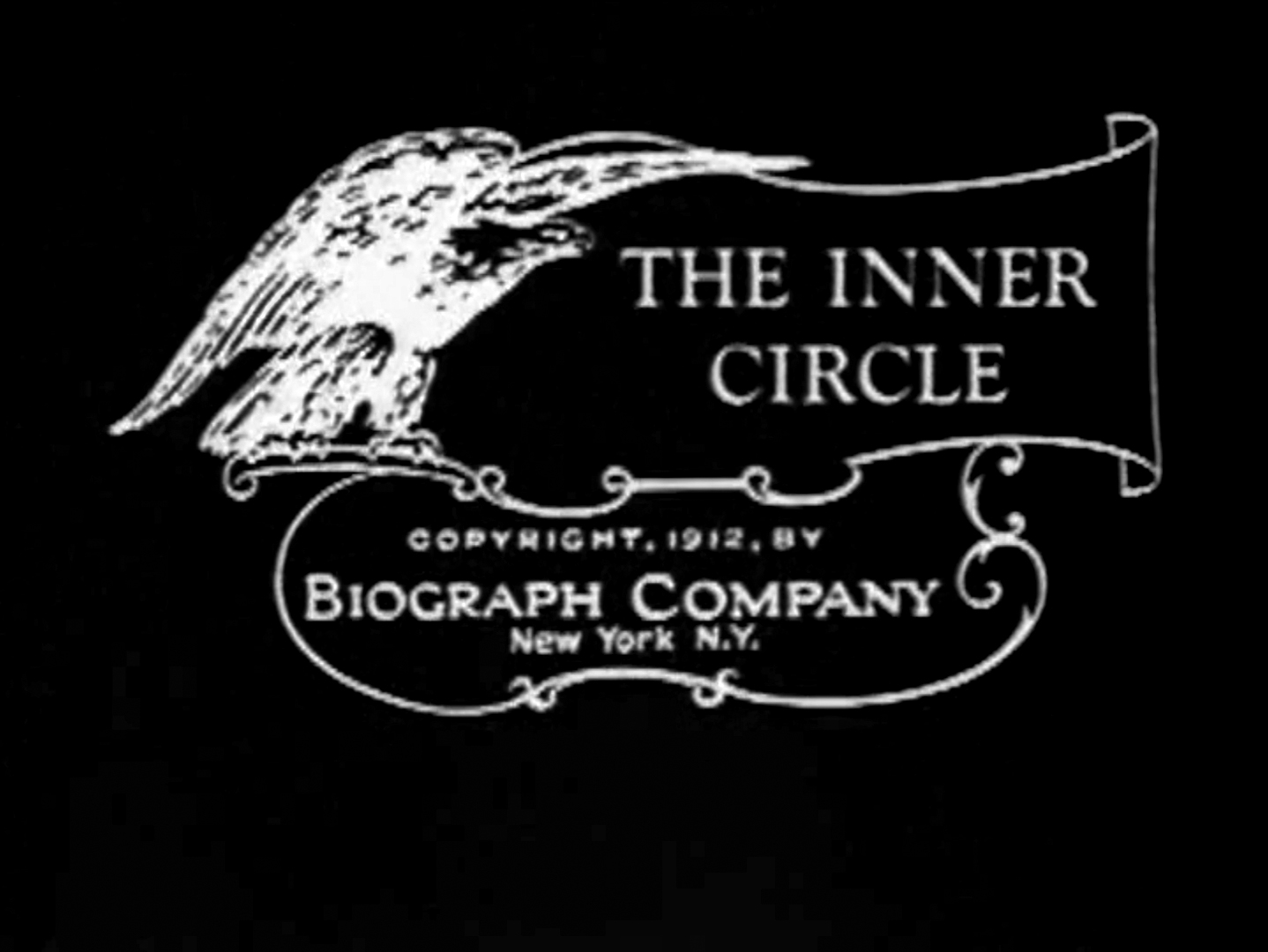
- Title card
- Directed by: D. W. Griffith
- Written by: George Hennessy
- Produced by: Biograph Company
- Starring: Mary Pickford; Blanche Sweet
- Cinematography: G. W. Bitzer
- Distributed by: General Film Company
- Release date: August 12, 1912
- Running time: 17 minutes
- Country: United States
- Language: Silent (English intertitles)

The Inner Circle is a 1912 American silent drama film directed by D. W. Griffith, starring Mary Pickford and Blanche Sweet. A print of the short survives in the film archive of the Library of Congress.

== Plot ==
Full film

A grieving widower cares for his young daughter in their threadbare home. This is in contrast to a happy family consisting of a wealthy Italian, his wife and at least two daughters, one a young woman, the other a child a little older than the widower's.

Two crooks, members of the "Inner Circle" of a "Society", send a threatening letter to the rich man, seeking to extort $5000 from him. The man instead goes directly to the police, with the extortionists following him to see what he will do. The crooks order the widower to attend a meeting of their Society. He is chosen by lot to place a bomb in the wealthy man's home. He reluctantly accepts the mission only after they menace him.

The wealthy man, accompanied by two plainclothes policemen, plants an envelope under a rose bush, following the directions in the extortion letter. However, they are seen by a suspicious character. They chase after and eventually catch the man. After questioning him, they let him go and return to the house.

The widower's daughter wanders onto the street and is knocked down by a passing car. Although the child is not injured, the wealthy man's wife picks her up and takes her home. The widower arrives and plants the bomb under the outside stairs just before the owner and the policemen return. He lights the fuse, but as he is leaving, he sees through a window his daughter inside. The policemen grab him, and one of them knocks him out with a punch before he can warn them. They take him inside. When he revives, he has just enough time to run out and throw the bomb away, though he is fatally wounded by the explosion. Before he dies, he appears to tell the policemen the Society's secret knocking pattern and where they are hiding. Armed with that information, the police arrest the Society members. The rich man's wife wants to keep the dead man's child, and her husband agrees.

== Cast ==
- Adolph Lestina as the widower
- Jack Pickford as the messenger
- J. Jiquel Lanoe as the rich Italian (surnamed Cataldo, an Italian name, in the Biograph Bulletin)
- Mary Pickford as the rich Italian's daughter
- Charles Hill Mailes as a gangster
- Joseph McDermott as a police agent
- Alfred Paget as a police agent
- W. Christy Cabanne in the gang
- Donald Crisp
- Gladys Egan as a little girl
- Charles Gorman as an accident witness
- Robert Harron in crowd / as an accident witness
- Mae Marsh
- Baden Powell as a little boy
- Blanche Sweet
- Kate Toncray in the crowd
- Henry B. Walthall
- Charles West

== See also ==
- List of American films of 1912
- D. W. Griffith filmography
- Mary Pickford filmography
