= The Poor Little Rich Girl =

1917 US film directed by Maurice Tourneur

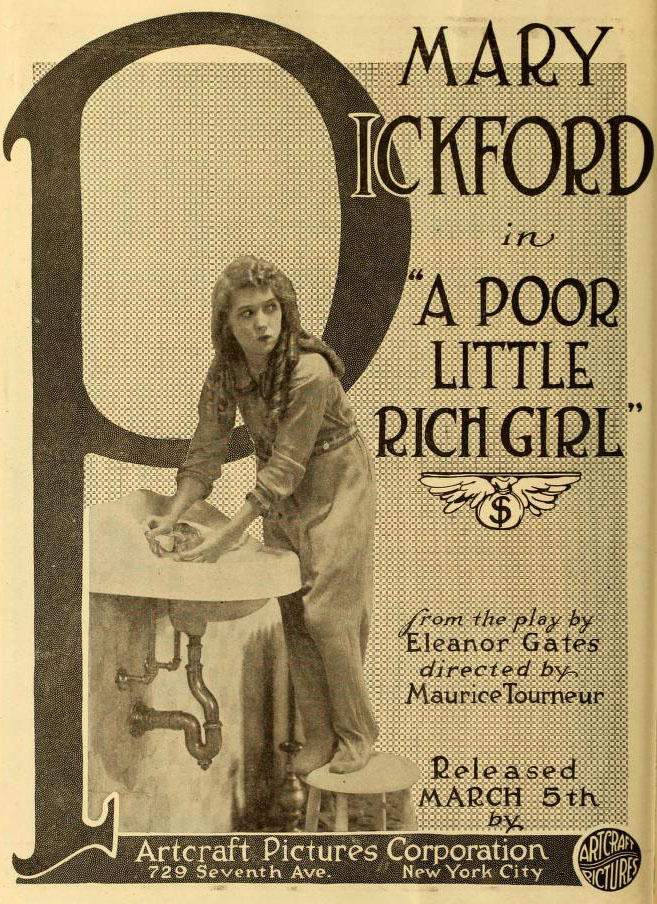
- Advertisement for the film
- Directed by: Maurice Tourneur
- Written by: Frances Marion
- Produced by: Adolph Zukor
- Starring: Mary Pickford; Madlaine Traverse; Charles Wellesley; Gladys Fairbanks
- Cinematography: Lucien Andriot; John van den Broek
- Distributed by: Artcraft Pictures Corporation
- Release date: March 5, 1917
- Running time: 65 minutes
- Country: United States
- Languages: Silent film English intertitles

The Poor Little Rich Girl is a 1917 American comedy-drama film directed by Maurice Tourneur. Adapted by Frances Marion from the 1913 play by Eleanor Gates. The Broadway play actually starred future screen actress Viola Dana. The film stars Mary Pickford, Madlaine Traverse, Charles Wellesley, Gladys Fairbanks (returning from the play) and Frank McGlynn Sr.

The film was shot in Fort Lee, New Jersey when early film studios in America's first motion picture industry were based there at the beginning of the 20th century. In 1991, The Poor Little Rich Girl was deemed "culturally, historically, or aesthetically significant" by the United States Library of Congress and selected for preservation in the National Film Registry.

== Plot ==
A Poor Little Rich Girl

Gwendolyn is an 11-year-old girl who is left by her rich and busy parents to the care of unsympathetic domestic workers at the family's mansion. Her mother is only interested in her social life and her father has serious financial problems and is even contemplating suicide. When she manages to have some good time with an organ-grinder or a plumber, or have a mud-fight with street boys, she is rapidly brought back on the right track. One day, she becomes sick because the maid has given her an extra dose of sleeping medicine to be able to go out. She then becomes delirious and starts seeing an imaginary world inspired by people and things around her; the Garden of Lonely Children in the Tell-Tale forest. Her conditions worsen and Death tries to lure her to eternal rest. But Life also appears to her and finally wins.

== Cast ==
- Mary Pickford as Gwendolyn
- Madlaine Traverse as Gwendolyn's Mother
- Charles Wellesley as Gwendolyn's Father
- Gladys Fairbanks as Jane
- Frank McGlynn Sr. as The Plumber
- Emile La Croix as The Organ Grinder
- Marcia Harris as Miss Royale
- Charles Craig as Thomas
- Frank Andrews as Potter
- Herbert Prior as The Doctor
- George Gernon as Johnny Blake
- Maxine Elliott Hicks as Susie May Squoggs

== Retrospective appraisal ==
Film historian Edward Wagenknecht identifies The Poor Little Rich Girl as an inflection point in Mary Pickford’s screen portrayals: ““[I]t was not until after the beginning of the feature film era that Miss Pickford became definitely associated with ingénue roles and it was not until The Poor Little Rich Girl that she appeared all through a feature as a child. Wagenknecht adds that Pickford’s character Gwen “is very different from either Rebecca or Pollyanna—more helpless and less resourceful and considerably more wistful.

Twenty-five-years-of-age when the film was released, Pickford struggled to transition to more mature roles later in her career.

== See also ==
- List of American comedy films
- Mary Pickford filmography
