= The Eternal Grind =

1916 film by John B. O'Brien

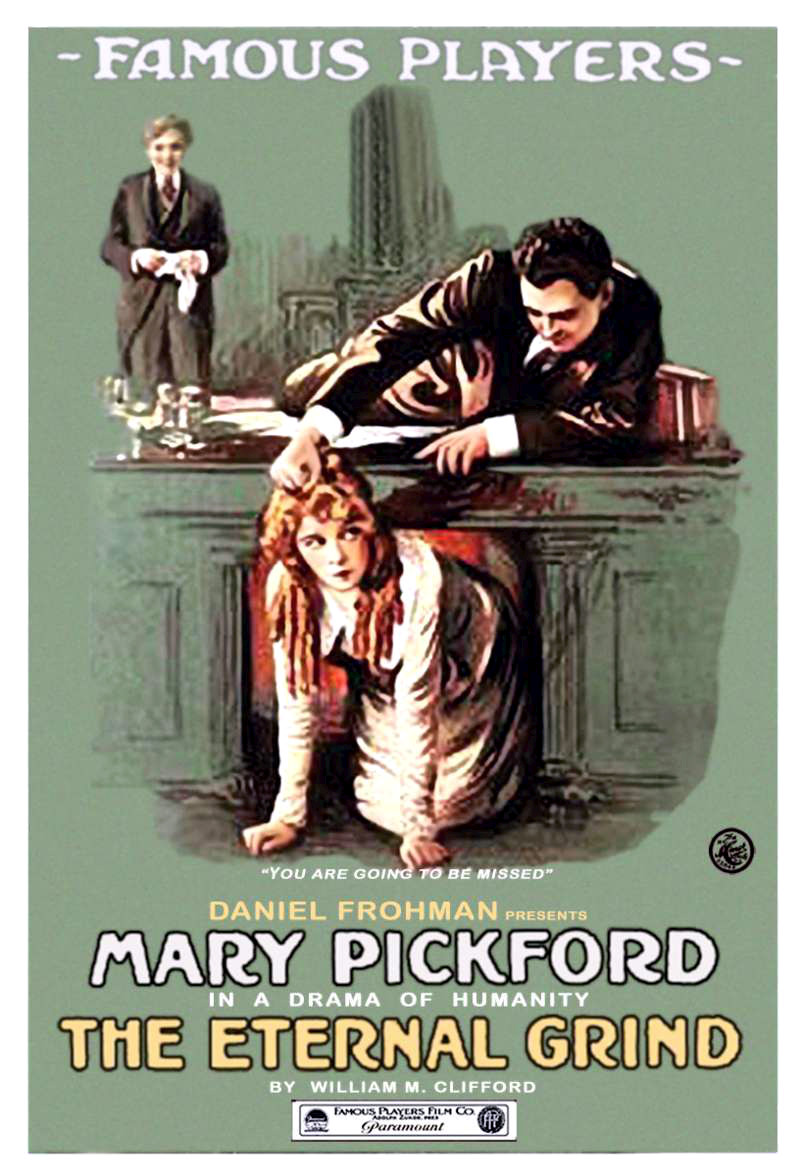
- Theatrical poster
- Directed by: John B. O'Brien
- Written by: William H. Clifford
- Produced by: Daniel Frohman; Adolph Zukor
- Starring: Mary Pickford
- Distributed by: Famous Players Film Company/Paramount Pictures
- Release date: April 17, 1916
- Running time: 5 reels
- Country: United States
- Languages: Silent film English intertitles

The Eternal Grind is a 1916 silent drama film directed by John B. O'Brien, and starring Mary Pickford. The film is inspired by the Triangle Shirtwaist Factory fire, which took place in 1911.

== Plot ==
Louise is a sewing-machine girl in a sweatshop in New York City. She lives together with her sisters Amy and Jane and are all deprived by bad conditions at work and sickness. Louise tries for the three of them to survive and regards herself as the keeper of her sisters.

Meanwhile, she stands up to her bosses and complains about the dreadful circumstances they work in. When Amy is seduced by the son of the shop-owner, Louise butts in and stops the romance. He eventually abandons Amy and becomes seriously injured in a cave-in. Louise has a secret crush on the son herself and tries to rescue him, hoping he will admit he loves her.

== Cast ==
- Mary Pickford - Louise
- Loretta Blake - Amy
- Dorothy West - Jane
- John Bowers - Owen Wharton
- Robert Cain - Ernest Wharton

== Reception ==
The film was received generally negatively, with The New York Times saying, "Obliged by her Famous Players contract to star in pedestrian melodramas like The Eternal Grind, it was no wonder that Mary Pickford yearned to become her own producer".

== Preservation status ==
A print is preserved in Cinémathèque française.

== See also ==
- List of American films of 1916
- Mary Pickford filmography
