= Behind the Scenes (1914 film) =

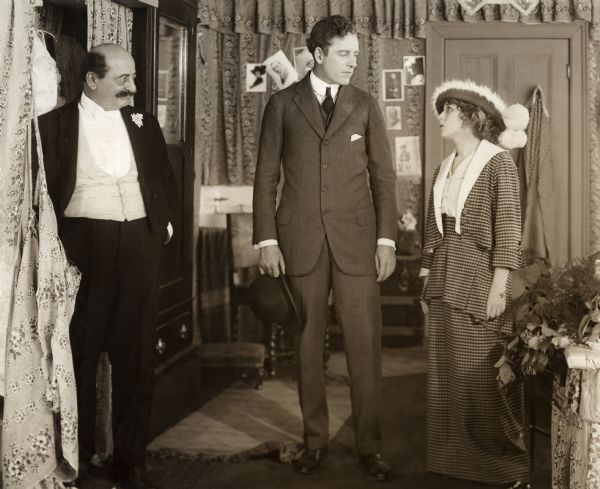
- Film still of Russell Bassett (left), James Kirkwood, and Mary Pickford
- Directed by: James Kirkwood
- Based on: Behind the Scenes by Margaret Mayo
- Produced by: Adolph Zukor; Daniel Frohman
- Starring: Mary Pickford; James Kirkwood; Lowell Sherman
- Cinematography: Emmett A. Williams
- Production company: Famous Players–Lasky
- Distributed by: Paramount Pictures
- Release date: October 26, 1914
- Running time: 5 reels
- Country: United States
- Language: Silent (English intertitles)

Behind the Scenes is a 1914 American silent drama film produced by Famous Players–Lasky, released by Paramount Pictures, based on the play Behind the Scenes by Margaret Mayo, and starring Mary Pickford as a struggling young actress. James Kirkwood directed and co-starred.

== Cast ==
- Mary Pickford as Dolly Lane
- James Kirkwood as Steve Hunter
- Lowell Sherman as Teddy Harrington
- Ida Waterman as Mrs. Harrington
- Russell Bassett as Joe Canby

== Preservation status ==
A print is in the George Eastman Museum Motion Picture Collection.
