= Mistress Nell =

1915 film by James Kirkwood

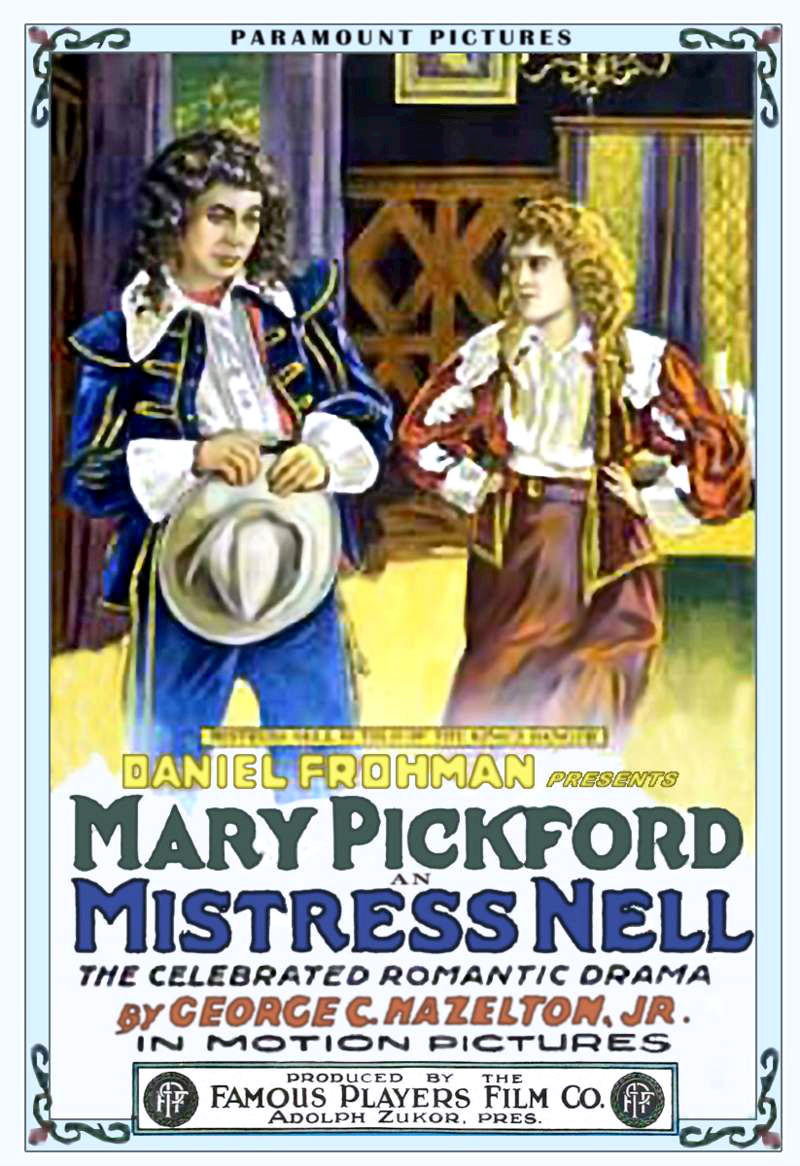
- Film poster
- Directed by: James Kirkwood
- Based on: Mistress Nell by George Cochrane Hazelton
- Produced by: Adolph Zukor; Daniel Frohman
- Starring: Mary Pickford; Owen Moore
- Distributed by: Paramount Pictures
- Release date: January 1, 1915
- Running time: 5 reels
- Country: United States
- Language: Silent (English intertitles)

Mistress Nell is a 1915 American silent historical adventure film starring Mary Pickford. It is yet another story about Nell Gwyn taken from a Broadway play Mistress Nell that was very successful for stage actress Henrietta Crosman from 1900 to 1902. This production was produced by Adolph Zukor's production company Famous Players Film Company and released through Paramount Pictures. The film is extant.

A surviving print is held by the Museum of Modern Art.

== Cast ==
- Mary Pickford as Nell Gwyn
- Owen Moore as King Charles II
- Arthur Hoops as Duke of Buckingham
- Ruby Hoffman as Louise, Duchess of Portsmouth
- Amelia Rose as Orange Moll
- Mr. Henry as Nobleman
- Mr. Rouse as Nobleman
- Mr. Bosch as Nobleman
- Henry S. Koser as Nobleman
- J. Albert Hall
- Nathaniel Sack

unbilled

- Hayward Mack (unknown role)
