= The Unwelcome Guest =

1913 film

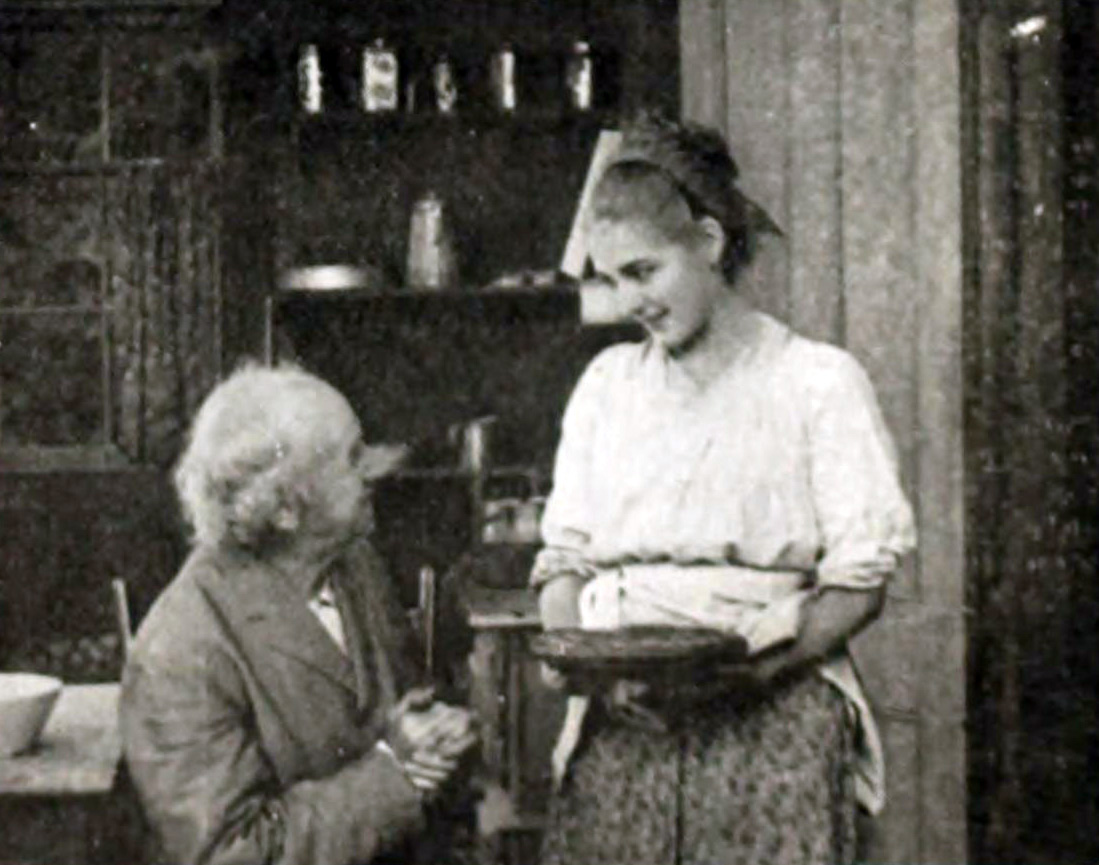
- Directed by: D. W. Griffith
- Written by: George Hennessy
- Starring: Mary Pickford
- Cinematography: G. W. Bitzer
- Production company: Biograph Company
- Distributed by: General Film Company
- Release date: March 15, 1913
- Running time: 17 minutes (16 frame/s)
- Country: United States
- Language: Silent (English intertitles)

The Unwelcome Guest is a 1913 American silent drama film directed by D. W. Griffith.

== Plot ==
An elderly married woman secretly stashes her accumulated money beneath the false bottom of an old shipping trunk before dying. Her husband believes himself penniless and must leave their home to live with his son's family, where he is treated without respect or consideration. A kindly young housekeeper arrives and befriends the old gentleman. They eventually run away together, taking the old shipping trunk with them.

== Cast ==
- Mary Pickford as the slavey
- W. Chrystie Miller as the old father
- Charles Hill Mailes as the son
- Claire McDowell as the wife
- Jack Pickford as one of the children
- Elmer Booth as the hired hand
- Kate Bruce as the old wife
- Harry Carey as the sheriff
- J. Jiquel Lanoe as the doctor
- Lionel Barrymore as at auction
- Frank Evans as at auction
- Lillian Gish as at auction
- Adolph Lestina as at auction
- W. C. Robinson as at auction
