= Hearts Adrift =

1914 American silent romance film

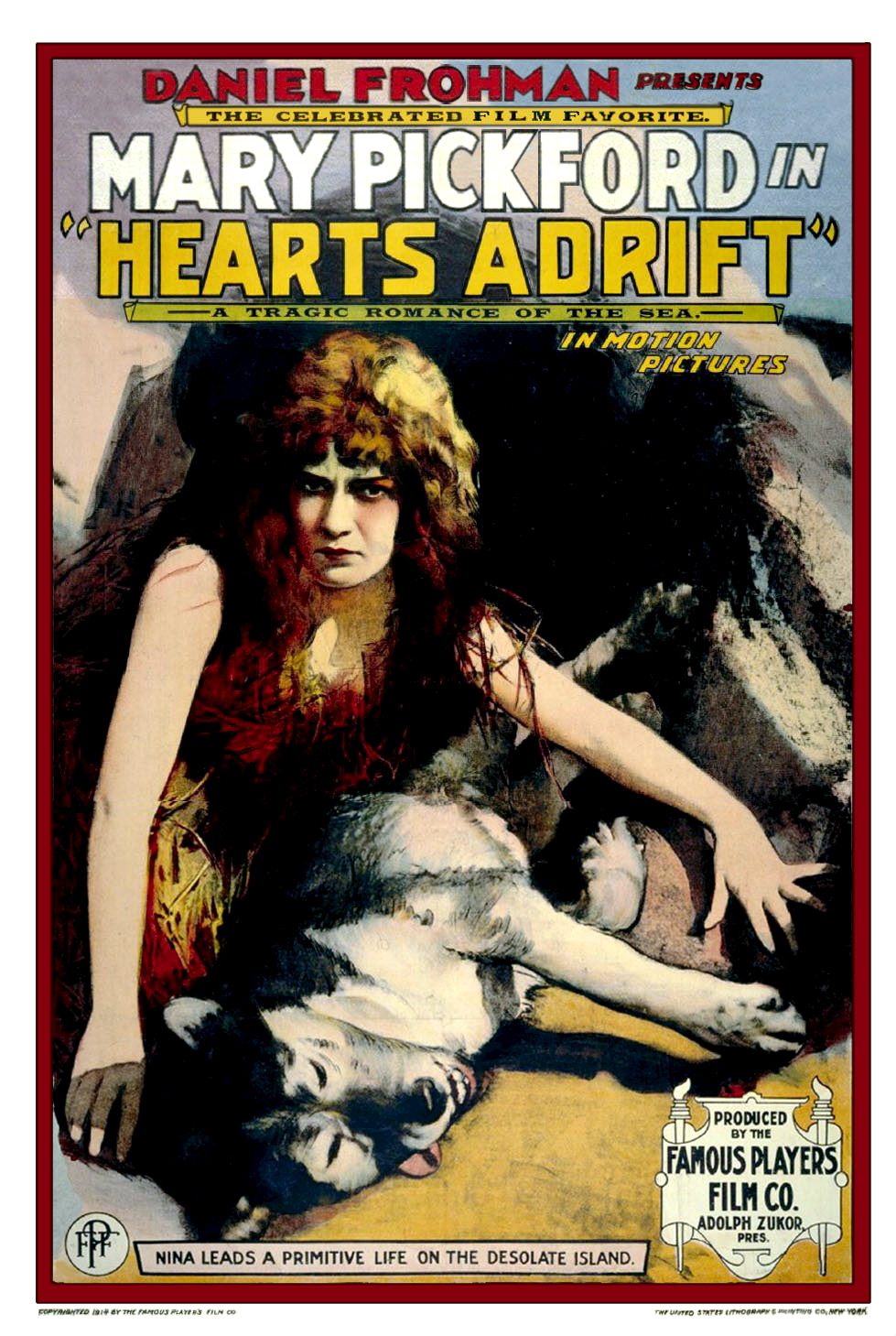
- Film poster
- Directed by: Edwin S. Porter
- Written by: Mary Pickford
- Based on: As the Sparks Fly Upward by Cyrus Townsend Brady
- Produced by: Famous Players Film Company
- Starring: Mary Pickford
- Production company: Famous Players Film Company
- Distributed by: Famous Players Film Company (State's Rights)
- Release date: February 10, 1914
- Running time: 5 reels
- Country: United States
- Language: Silent (English intertitles)

Hearts Adrift is a 1914 American silent short romance film directed by Edwin S. Porter. The film is now considered lost.

== Plot ==
Nina (Mary Pickford) and Jack Graham (Harold Lockwood) are both marooned on a deserted island. They fall in love and eventually Nina gives birth to a child. Despite being stranded, they are very happy together. One day, Jack's wife comes to rescue him. Nina is crushed and throws herself in a volcano.

== Production ==
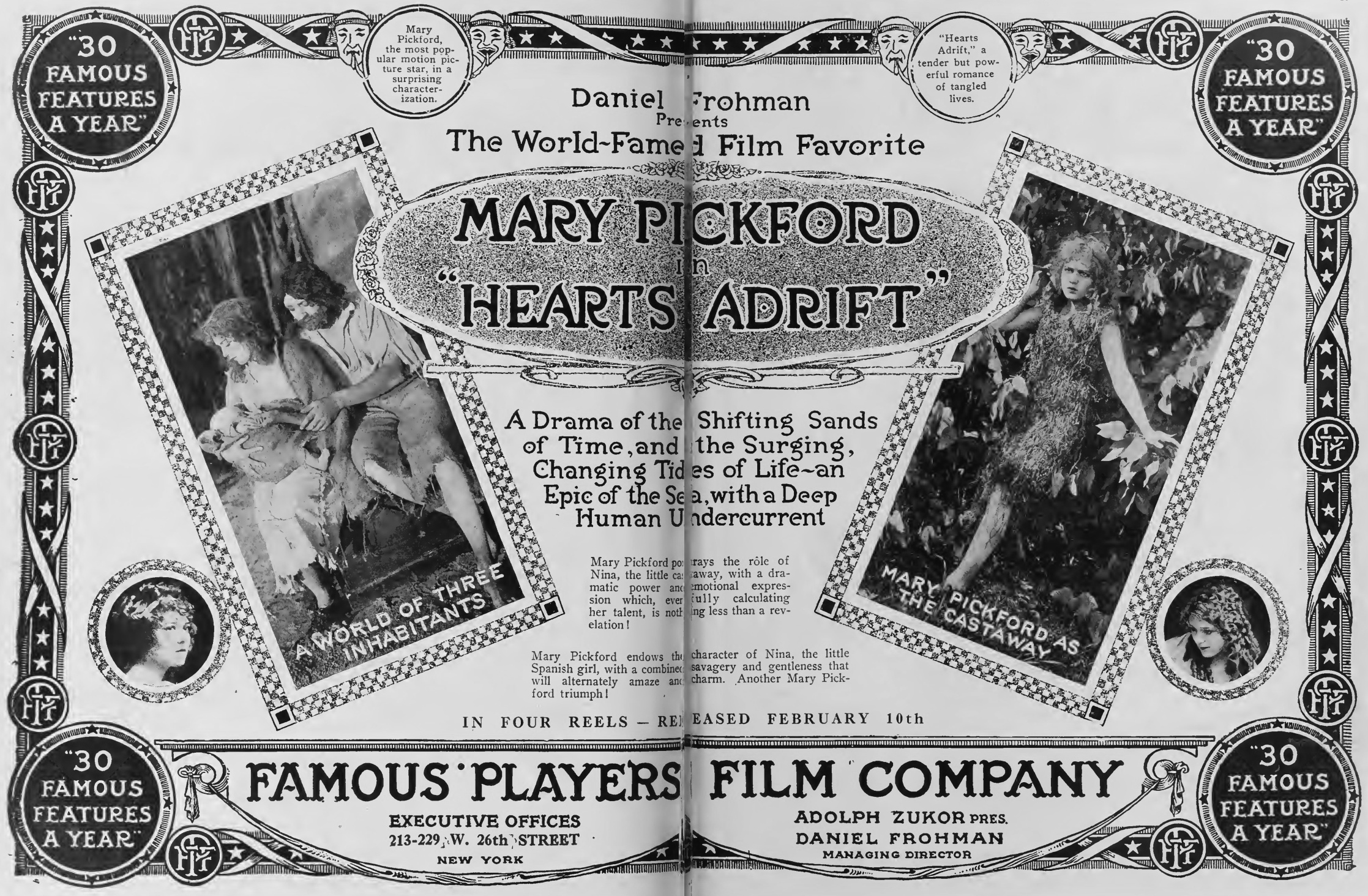
Advertisement from a trade magazine

The film bears a great resemblance to the 1911 story As the Sparks Fly Upward by Cyrus Townsend Brady. The film did not credit Brady, who sued the studio. The film's story also bears resemblance to the 1908 novel The Blue Lagoon by Henry De Vere Stacpoole. The story was also filmed various times under the title The Blue Lagoon, in a 1923 version, a 1949 version starring Jean Simmons, and a 1980 version starring Brooke Shields.

The film proved to be a huge success. Actress Mary Pickford eventually demanded a higher salary from Adolph Zukor as her popularity rose because of this film.

== Cast ==
- Mary Pickford as Nina
- Harold Lockwood as Jack Graham
