= Less Than the Dust =

1916 film by Erich von Stroheim, John Emerson

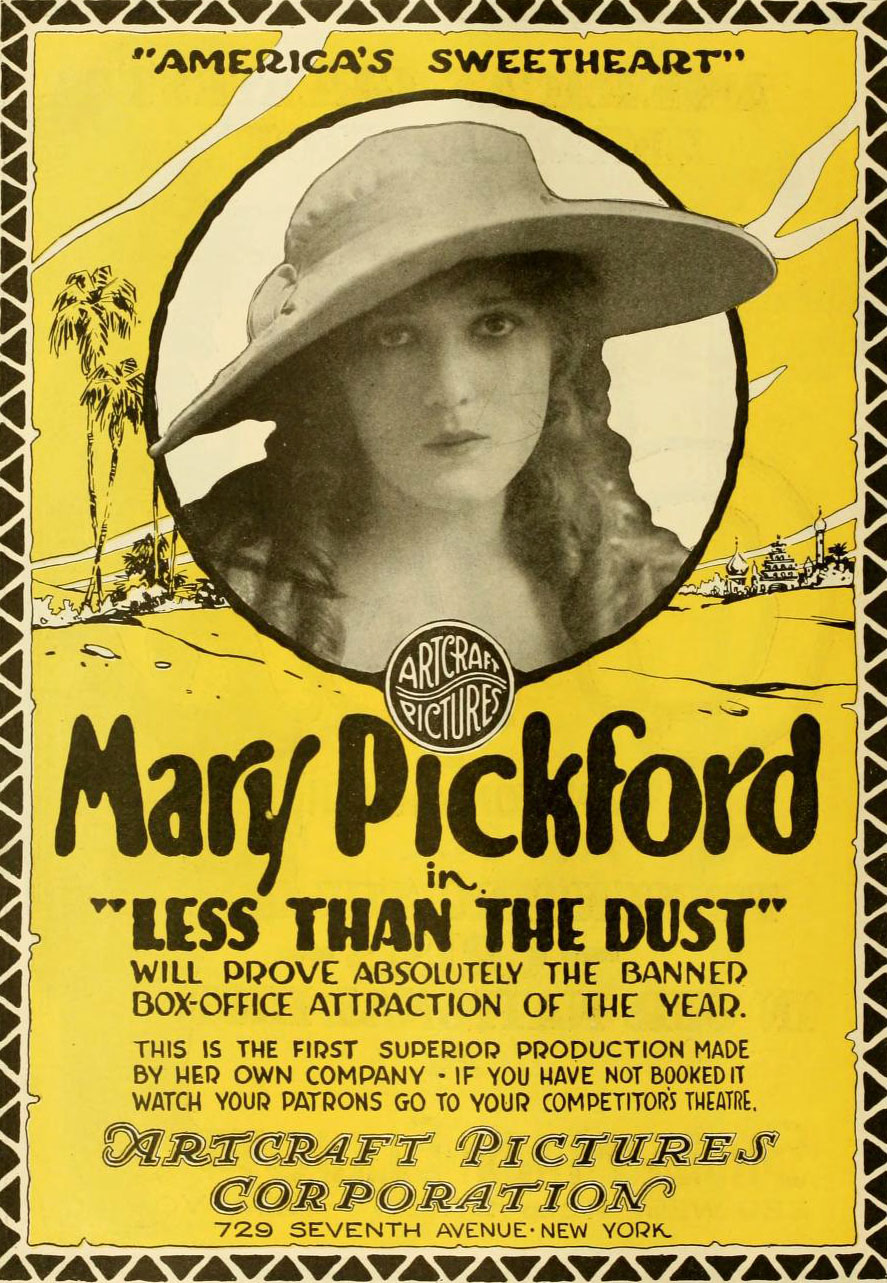
- Directed by: John Emerson; Edwin L. Hollywood(ass't director); Erich von Stroheim(ass't director)
- Written by: Hector Turnbull (scenario)
- Produced by: Mary Pickford
- Starring: Mary Pickford
- Cinematography: George W. Hill
- Music by: Edward J. Howe
- Distributed by: Artcraft Pictures
- Release date: November 5, 1916
- Running time: 7 reels
- Country: United States
- Language: Silent (English intertitles)

Less than the Dust is a 1916 American silent feature film produced by and starring Mary Pickford with a release by Artcraft Pictures, an affiliate of Paramount Pictures. John Emerson directed and Eric von Stroheim was one of the assistant directors. There is a 35mm copy of this film that still survives.

The film was released on 6 November 1916.

== Plot ==
Radha is a lower-caste Hindu orphan girl, raised by Ramlan, a sword maker. Radha is taught English in the street by a religious character. Witnessing the scene, a British officer, Captain Townsend, offers her a book Less Than the Dust, and Other Indian Love Lyrics; he soon returns to England. Ramlan reveals to Radha that her father was in fact British, a certain Captain Brooke, who died of an opium overdose. Radha goes to England to claim her inheritance: it so happens that her grandfather is also Townsend's uncle and that he just died. Townsend soon marries Radha.

== Cast ==
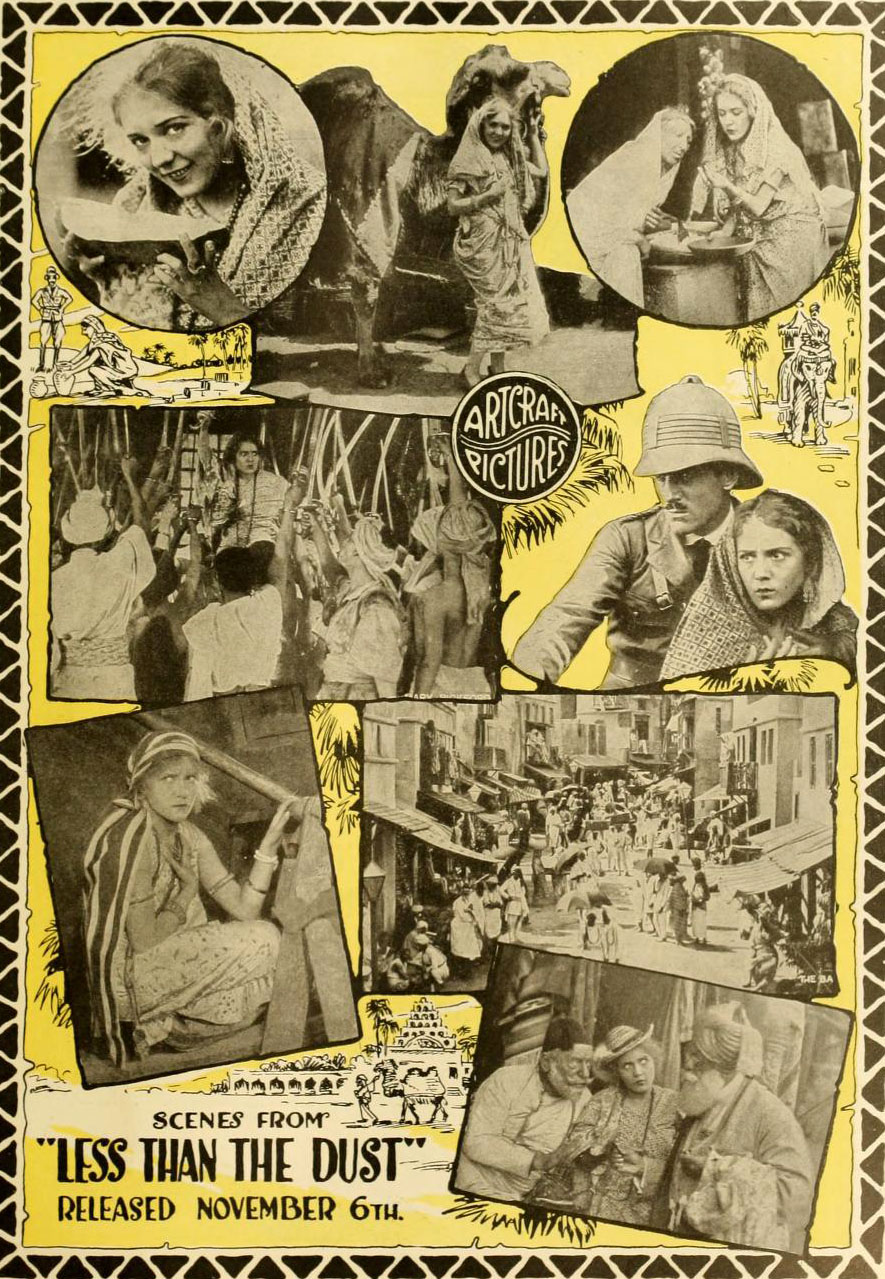
Advertisement

- Mary Pickford - Radha
- David Powell - Capt. Richard Townsend
- Frank Losee - Capt. Bradshaw
- Mary Alden - Mrs. Bradshaw
- Mario Majeroni - Ramlan
- Cesare Gravina - Jawan
- Francis Joyner - A Derelict
- Russell Bassett - Ahmed
- Walter Morgan - Bhesstie
- Merceita Esmond - A Gossip (as Mercita Esmonde)
- Nathaniel Sack - Undetermined Role
- Frank Lackteen - (unbilled)

== Reception ==
The Moving Picture World saluted Pickford's return to the screen after a few months hiatus.
