= Fate's Turning =

1911 silent drama film

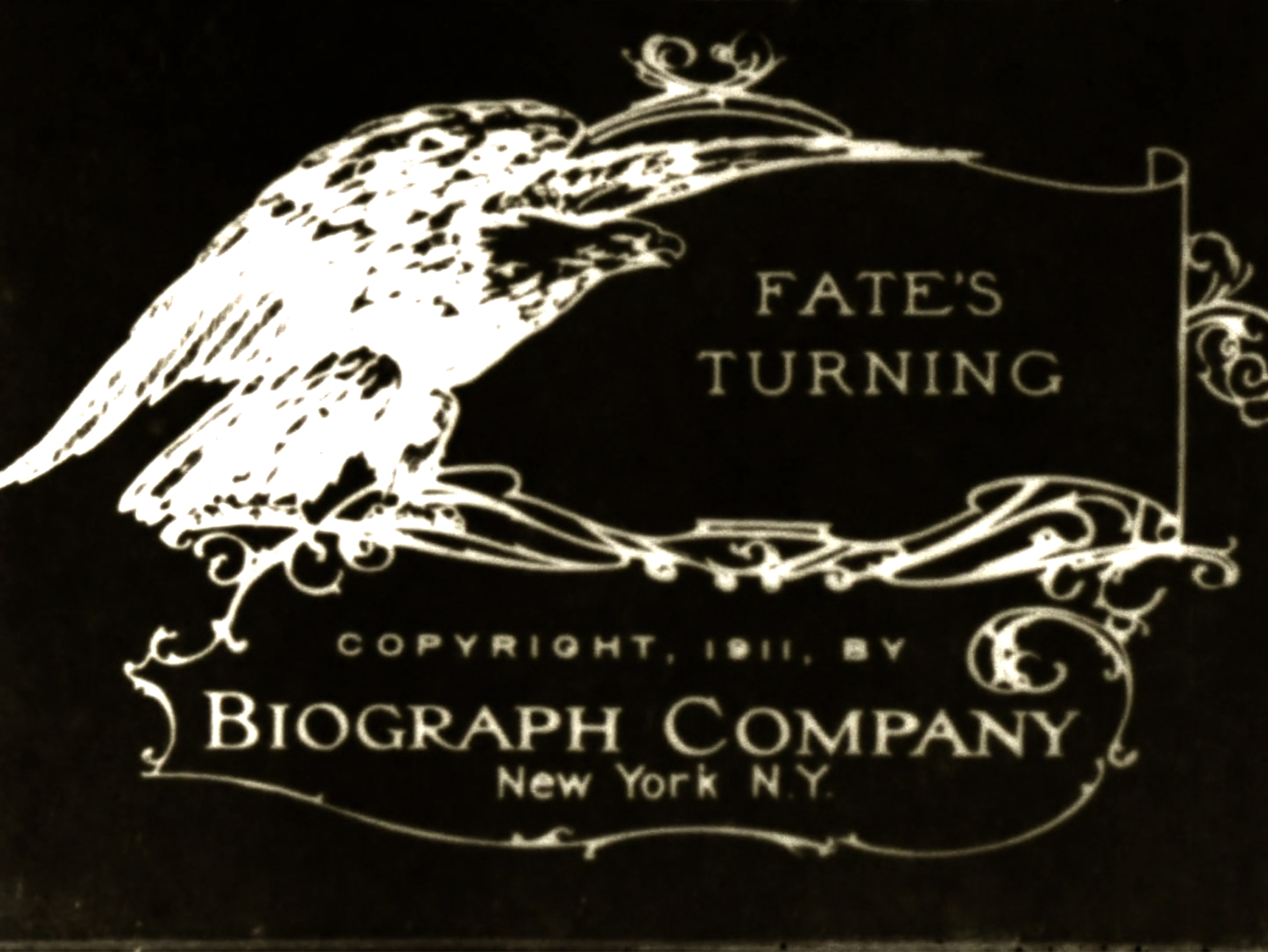
- Title card
- Directed by: D. W. Griffith
- Starring: Charles H. West
- Cinematography: G. W. Bitzer
- Production company: Biograph Company
- Distributed by: General Film Company
- Release date: January 23, 1911
- Country: United States
- Language: Silent (English intertitles)

Fate's Turning is a 1911 short silent drama film directed by D. W. Griffith and produced by the Biograph Company. It stars Charles H. West and features Stephanie Longfellow. It survives in the Library of Congress.

Surviving film

== Plot ==
Young man John Lawson, Jr., has a nervous breakdown. (According to the January 23. 1911 Biograph Bulletin, the breakdown is a result of taking over the family business from his ailing father, though this is not presented onscreen.) When the father recovers, John leaves his fiancée Grace for a "rest cure" at a hotel, accompanied by his valet. In the hotel's dining room, he admires his pretty waitress, Mary. He becomes so enamored with her that he soon proposes, and she accepts.

Then he is notified that his father is dangerously ill. He rushes home, leaving his valet to break the news to Mary. John returns just in time to have a few moments with his father before the latter dies.

After the funeral, John writes back in response to Mary's letter, breaking off their engagement due to the great disparity in social status. She goes to see him. First encountering Grace, Mary tells her about her situation. When Grace does not believe her, Mary shows her her engagement ring. Lawson appears, but is unmoved by Mary's pleadings.

On the day of the wedding of John and Grace, he is puzzled by her cold reception. She sends him into the next room, where Mary is lying down ... with their child. Hostile at first, John eventually goes on his knees to her and takes her hand. (According to the Biograph Bulletin, the Library of Congress entry and other sources, they are married.)

== Cast ==
- Charles H. West as John Lawson, Jr.
- Stephanie Longfellow as His fiancée
- Grace Henderson as Grace's mother
- Dorothy Bernard as Mary, a waitress
- Donald Crisp as Valet
- Adolph Lestina as Minister
- Francis J. Grandon as Doctor
- Edward Dillon as Attorney
- J. Jiquel Lanoe as Attorney
- Kate Toncray as Servant
- Elmer Booth as Servant
- Claire McDowell at hotel and at wedding
- Alfred Paget at hotel and at wedding
- Jack Pickford at hotel
- John T. Dillon at hotel
- Edwin August at wedding
- Marion Sunshine at wedding
- Guy Hedlund at wedding

== Reception ==
The Moving Picture News reviewer wrote in the February 25, 1911 issue: "We've read enough of this sort of late; there's no need to put them on the screen. Aim of this production unknown."

== Analysis ==
Russell Merritt wrote in The Griffith Project Volume 4: Films Produced in 1910 that John Lawson is an example of the "effete heroes who ... became part of Griffith's trademark in the 1920s".

== See also ==
- D. W. Griffith filmography
