= The Crooked Road (1911 film) =

1911 film directed by D. W. Griffith

- Directed by: D. W. Griffith
- Produced by: Biograph Company
- Starring: Dell Henderson; Stephanie Longfellow
- Cinematography: G. W. Bitzer
- Distributed by: General Film Company
- Release date: May 22, 1911
- Running time: 1 reel
- Country: United States
- Language: Silent (English intertitles)

The Crooked Road is a 1911 silent short film directed by D. W. Griffith. It is preserved in a paper print in the Library of Congress collection.

== Cast ==
- Dell Henderson as The Husband
- Stephanie Longfellow as The Wife
- Kate Bruce as A Neighbor
- William J. Butler as Pawnbroker
- Edward Dillon
- John T. Dillon as In Bar / In Second Bar (as Jack Dillon)
- Gladys Egan as One of the Children
- Joseph Graybill as An Evil Companion
- Guy Hedlund as In Second Bar
- Grace Henderson as The Landlady
- Jeanie MacPherson as In Pawnshop
- Claire McDowell as A Neighbor
- W. Chrystie Miller as In Second Bar
- Alfred Paget as In Bar
- Baden Powell as One of the Children
