= The Little Boy Scout =

- Directed by: Francis J. Grandon
- Written by: Charles Sarver
- Produced by: Adolph Zukor
- Starring: Ann Pennington
- Cinematography: William Marshall
- Distributed by: Paramount Pictures
- Release date: June 18, 1917
- Running time: 5 reels
- Country: United States
- Language: Silent (English intertitles)

The Little Boy Scout is a lost 1917 American silent drama film produced by Famous Players Film Company and released by Paramount Pictures. It was directed by Francis J. Grandon and starred Ann Pennington. The motion picture was also known as "The Little Soldier Girl".

== Plot ==
As described in a film magazine review, the film takes place during the American troop maneuvers along the border during the Mexican Revolution. Justina Howland lives with Miguel Alvarez, her Mexican guardian, who insists that she marry his son Luis. On the eve of the wedding Justina rebels and leaves. She is taken in at the border by Thomas Morton and his company of Massachusetts soldiers. Justina goes to live with her aunt Elizabeth and, shortly after her arrival there, the troops from the border return and Justina renews her acquaintance with Thomas. In order to save herself from her Mexican uncle, who has pursued her, she marries Thomas.

A Reading, Pennsylvania, newspaper review described the movie in detail: "The Little Boy Scout tells the story of a little American girl who runs away from her ward to marry a soldier boy ... The various scenes show the National Guard encampment along the Rio Grand of a year ago ... and a particularly interesting feature is the appearance of Troop No. 100, the crack Boy Scout unit of the United States. Justina Howland lives in Mexico with her guardian and uncle, Miguel, who plans to leave her marry his son, Luis. Justina refuses and runs away from them across the border to the American side, where she is taken care of by a company of soldiers under the command of Lieutenant Morton. They take up a collection to reach her Aunt Betty in Massachusetts. She arrives there the same time Lieutenant does, and she later finds out that he is the scout master of the local organization. Her uncle follows her to Massachusetts, asserting that he will force her to marry his son. One of the boy scouts is hurt and is brought to her aunt’s house. Justina decides to put on his uniform and get away through the window while her aunt holds off the search party. With the help of Lieutenant Morton and the boy scouts she reaches the New Hampshire boundary. Her uncle catches up with them and while he goes to secure a New Hampshire sheriff, Morton secures a minister and he and Justina are married."

Dancing was also featured: “In one scene the star is given opportunity to display her dancing ability which first won her fame when she was a prominent figure in the Zigfield “Follies” in New York City. Boy Scout Troop 100, from the Upper West Side of Manhattan, New York City, and featured in the movie was known for its drilling and signaling skills. A picture of Pennington in a Troop 100 uniform appeared in the St. Louis Star and Times that year.

== Cast ==
- Ann Pennington - Justina Howland
- Owen Moore - Thomas Morton
- Fraunie Fraunholtz - Miguel Alvarez
- Marcia Harris - Elizabeth Howland
- George Burton - Luis Alvarez
- Harry Lee - Sergeant Jones

== Reception ==
Like many American films of the time, The Little Boy Scout was subject to cuts by city and state film censorship boards. The Chicago Board of Censors required the cutting of a closeup showing currency in a hat.
