= The Crooked Road (disambiguation) =

The Crooked Road may refer to:

- The Crooked Road (1911 film), American silent drama short directed by D. W. Griffith
- The Crooked Road (1940 film), American drama directed by Phil Rosen for Republic
- The Crooked Road (1965 film), British international intrigue film based on Morris West novel
- Crooked Road, Virginia, Southwestern Virginia heritage trail exploring region's musical history

== See also ==
- Drive a Crooked Road, 1954 American crime film noir starring Mickey Rooney
