= The Girl and Her Trust =

1912 film

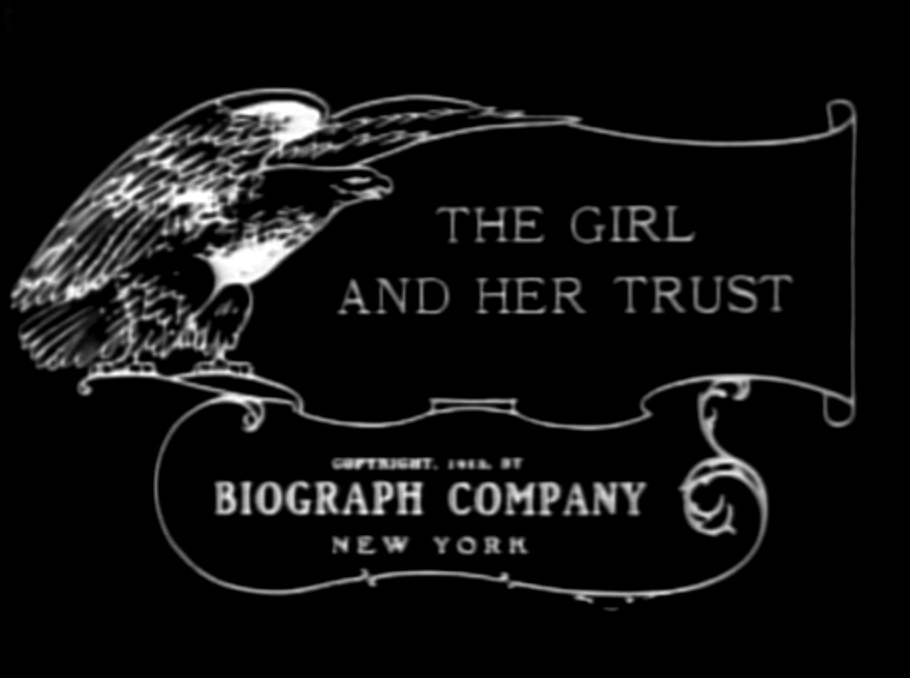
- Title card
- Directed by: D. W. Griffith
- Written by: George Hennessy
- Produced by: Biograph Company
- Starring: Dorothy Bernard; Wilfred Lucas
- Cinematography: G. W. Bitzer
- Music by: Clifton Hyde (co-composer); Lev Zhurbin
- Distributed by: Biograph Company
- Release date: March 28, 1912
- Running time: 17 minutes
- Country: United States
- Language: Silent (English intertitles)

The Girl and Her Trust is a 1912 American short silent drama film directed by D. W. Griffith. The film is a remake of Griffith's earlier film The Lonedale Operator, released in 1911.

Full movie

== Plot ==
Grace is a telegraph operator at Hillville and a woman who is very popular with the men in town. She is most fond of Jack, her co-worker who attempts to steal a kiss, causing Grace to reject him. Grace gets informed that Train No. 7 will be bringing a payroll of two thousand dollars from a bank to be picked up at her office. Jack offers to let Grace have his pistol while he goes out to lunch. Grace refuses his offer, believing that there is no danger to be found in such a slow place.

Once the money is delivered, Jack offers Grace his pistol once more but is refused again. After Jack leaves, two railroad tramps who had hitched a ride on train No. 7 spot the bag of cash and attempt to break into the office and steal the money. They try to open the box that the money is in but it's locked so they come for Grace who has the key. Grace locks herself behind the inner door to the office.

Grace calls out for help via a telegraph message. Unfortunately the tramps take the strongbox with the money onto a handcar and take it away. Grace chases after them and jumps onto the handcar attempting to fight the two men. They overpower her, however, and take her hostage. Jack is unhappily walking along the track after the rejection of his kiss, and sees them racing away on a railroad hand-car. He flags down a train and chases after them at full speed. They are finally caught and a grateful, forgiving Grace rewards Jack with a kiss.

== Cast ==
- Dorothy Bernard as Grace, the telegraph operator
- Wilfred Lucas as Jack, the railroad express agent
- Alfred Paget as The first tramp
- Charles Hill Mailes as The second tramp
- Charles West as Telegrapher
- Robert Harron as Telegrapher's assistant
- W. C. Robinson as Grace's shy suitor
- W. Christy Cabanne as Baggage handler
- William A. Carroll as Engineer
- Charles Gorman (uncredited) as Older tramp

== See also ==
- List of American films of 1912
- D. W. Griffith filmography
