= Fanatics (1917 film) =

1917 film

- Directed by: Raymond Wells
- Written by: John Lynch; Joseph Anthony Roach
- Produced by: Thomas H. Ince
- Starring: Adda Gleason; J. Barney Sherry; William V. Mong
- Cinematography: Pliny Horne
- Production company: Triangle Film Corporation
- Distributed by: Triangle Distributing
- Release date: December 9, 1917
- Running time: 50 minutes
- Country: United States
- Languages: Silent; English intertitles

Fanatics is a 1917 American silent drama film directed by Raymond Wells and starring Adda Gleason, J. Barney Sherry and William V. Mong. It was one of a number of films made about coal mining conflicts during the silent era.

== Cast ==
- Adda Gleason as Mary Lathrop
- J. Barney Sherry as Nicholas Eyre
- William V. Mong as Hugh Groesbeck
- Don Fuller as Robert Lathrop
- Olga Grey as Lola Monroe
- Eugene Burr as Billy Haskell
- Edward Hayden as Eyre's Clerk
- Will Jeffries as Foreman

== Bibliography ==
- Ross, Steven J. Working-Class Hollywood: Silent Film and the Shaping of Class in America. Princeton University Press, 2020.
