= The Making of an American =

1920 film

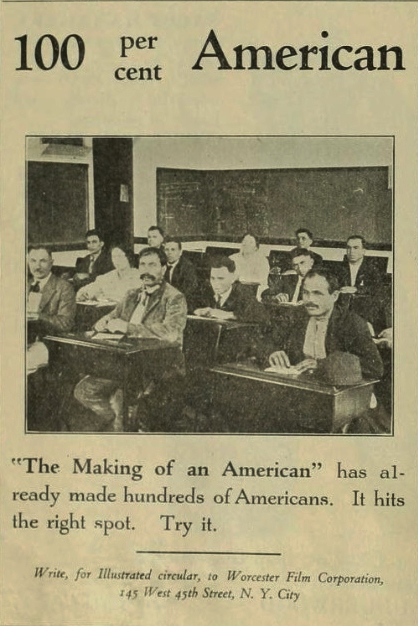
- Advertisement for film in Educational Film Magazine
- Directed by: Guy Hedlund
- Produced by: Worcester Film Corporation
- Starring: Emile De Verny
- Production companies: State of Connecticut Department of Americanization; Worcester Film Corporation
- Distributed by: Worcester Film Corporation
- Release date: March 8, 1920
- Running time: 14 minutes
- Country: United States
- Language: Silent (English intertitles)

The Making of an American is a 1920 American silent short film used as an educational tool in the governmental Americanization initiatives to assimilate immigrants into mainstream culture, especially by encouraging them to learn the English language. It was produced for the State of Connecticut Department of Americanization by the Worcester Film Corp., a company founded in 1918 in Worcester, Massachusetts. The film was rediscovered and preserved by Northeast Historic Film (NHF) a regional moving image archive in New England.

== Synopsis of film ==
The Making of an American.

Pete, a young Italian new to America, is forced to take a position as a day laborer because he cannot speak English. After an encounter with an unattended freight elevator and a sign in English that he cannot read, he finds himself in the hospital. When passing the post office he sees a sign in several languages calling upon foreigners attend night school to learn English. Pete signs up and attends the class. As a result, he is able to secure a better job.

Education Film Magazine (1920)

=== Cast ===
- Emile De Verny - Italian immigrant

== Production and background ==
Vintage Connecticut government reports on the making of the film and its dissemination, indicate that the film was shown to more than 112,500 people the year it was made, and that copies were sold to other states interested in Americanization programs. The film was targeted to industrial workers and contains location filming at the Hartford Rubber Works Company. The film was lost until 1999 when Alan Kattelle donated a film copy among a collection of other reels to Northeast Historic Film. The Kattelle print was on 28mm film stock, an extremely rare format that was primarily used for educational film distribution from 1913 to 1923.

In 2005, the film was selected for preservation in the United States National Film Registry by the Library of Congress as being "culturally, historically, or aesthetically significant".

== See also ==
- Immigration to the United States of America
- Melting pot
- Salad bowl (cultural idea)
