= The Foundling (1916 film) =

1916 film by John B. O'Brien

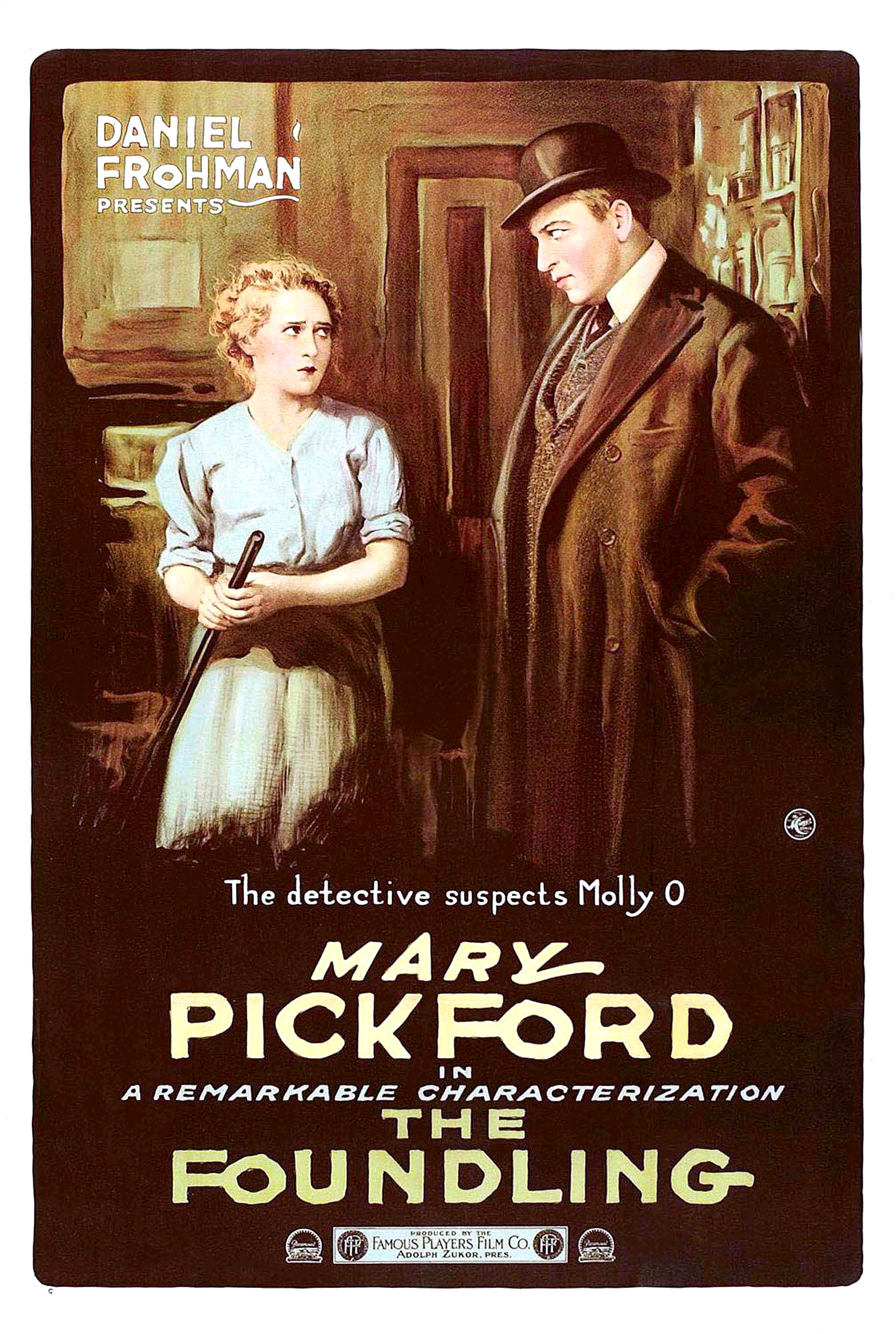
- Theatrical poster
- Directed by: John B. O'Brien
- Written by: Frances Marion
- Produced by: Mary Pickford
- Starring: Mary Pickford
- Distributed by: Paramount Pictures
- Release date: January 2, 1916
- Country: United States
- Languages: Silent film English intertitles

The Foundling is a 1916 silent film directed by John B. O'Brien. The film is a remake of the lost film The Foundling and serves as its replacement, as the 1915 Allan Dwan directed version was destroyed in the nitrate fire at Famous Players September 11, 1915. A print of this film still exists.

== Plot ==
Molly O is a poor little girl whose mother died in childbirth and father David King rejects her. When David departs to Italy to paint his dead wife as the Madonna, Molly O is left behind in a cruel orphanage. She is beloved by the other pupils, but becomes enemies with the matron's niece Jennie. As a result, she is shipped off to live with a boardinghouse proprietress. She is treated more like a slave than as an adopted daughter and decides to run away.

Meanwhile, King returned from Italy and is now a wealthy and successful painter. He regrets having left behind his daughter and now longs for her presence. Jennie pretends to be Molly O to make profit of his wealth and is adopted by him. However, Molly O returns as well. Afraid to tell the truth, she serves as his maid.

== Cast ==
- Mary Pickford - Molly O
- Edward Martindel - David King
- Maggie Weston - Mrs. Grimes
- Mildred Morris - Jennie
- Marcia Harris - Julia Ember
- Tammany Young - Crook
- James Kirkwood Sr.
