= Adda Gleason =

American actress (1888–1971)

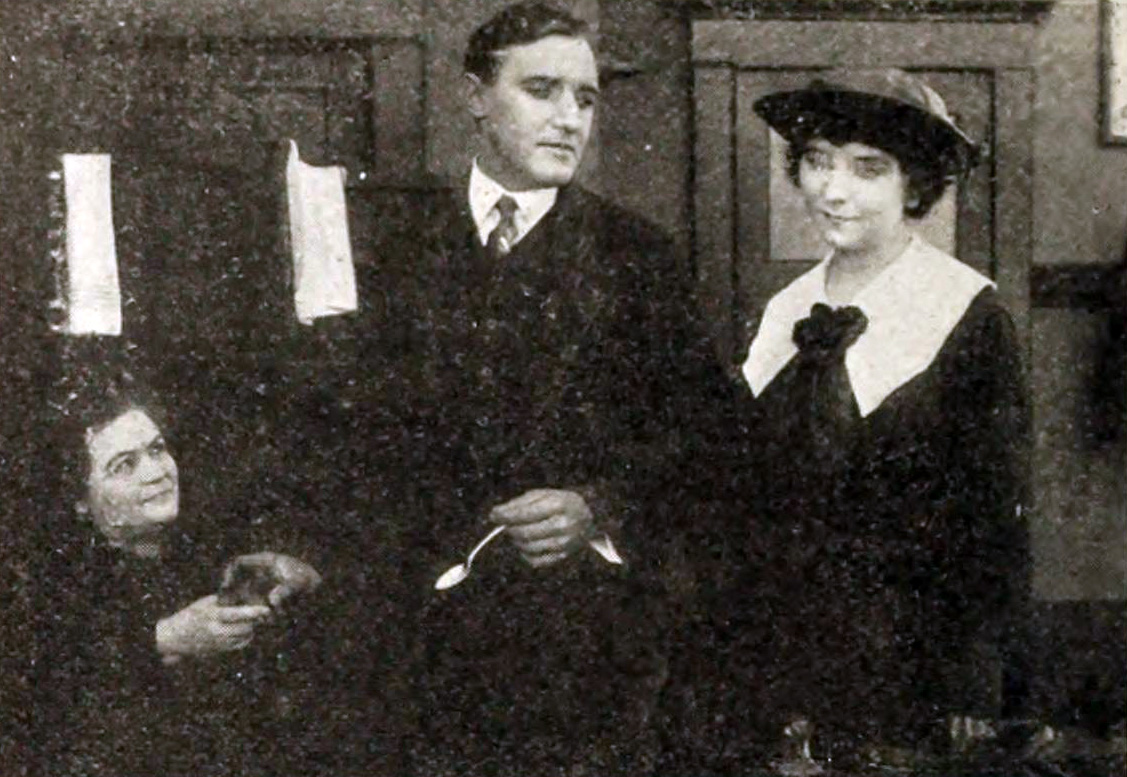
- Gleason in a scene from Prisoners of Conscience (1916)
- Born: December 19, 1888; Chicago, Illinois, U.S.
- Died: February 6, 1971 (aged 82); Los Angeles, California, U.S.
- Occupations: Actress, writer

Adda Gleason (December 19, 1888 – February 6, 1971) was an American actress and writer.

Chicago-born Gleason starred in the 1916 film adaptation of Ramona. On Broadway, Gleason portrayed Charlotte in The Dust Heap (1924).

In addition to her acting, Gleason wrote for some newspapers in the western United States, including the Morning Journal in Albuquerque.

== Selected filmography ==
- To Be Called For (1914)
- The Livid Flame (1914)
- Ramona (1916)
- The Voice in the Fog (1916)
- The Spirit of '76 (1917)
- Fanatics (1917)
- That Devil, Bateese (1918)
- The Thunderbolt (1919)
- How Baxter Butted In (1925)
- The Old Soak (1926)
- Man Bait (1927)
- The College Coquette (1929)
