= His Trust Fulfilled =

1911 film directed by D. W. Griffith

- Directed by: D. W. Griffith
- Written by: Emmett C. Hall
- Starring: Wilfred Lucas
- Cinematography: G. W. Bitzer
- Distributed by: Biograph Company
- Release date: January 19, 1911
- Running time: 17 minutes (16 frame/s)
- Country: United States
- Language: Silent (English intertitles)

His Trust Fulfilled is a 1911 American drama film directed by D. W. Griffith. It is a sequel to His Trust. Prints of the film survive in the film archives of the Library of Congress and the Museum of Modern Art.

== Cast ==
- Wilfred Lucas as George
- Claire McDowell as Mrs. Frazier (the dying mother)
- Gladys Egan as The Little Orphan
- Dorothy West as The Frazier child, as an adult
- Verner Clarges as John Gray (the lawyer)
- Linda Arvidson
- Dorothy Bernard
- Clara T. Bracy as Freed slave / Woman in wedding group
- Kate Bruce
- Adele DeGarde as The Frazier child
- John T. Dillon as Man in wedding group (as Jack Dillon)
- Guy Hedlund as Freed slave / Man in wedding group
- Dell Henderson
- Grace Henderson as The landlady
- Harry Hyde as The English cousin
- Adolph Lestina as Freed slave
- Jeanie MacPherson as Woman in wedding group
- Violet Mersereau
- Jack Pickford as Black messenger
- Mack Sennett
- Marion Sunshine as Woman in wedding group

== See also ==
- 1911 in film
- D. W. Griffith filmography
