= Was He a Coward? =

1911 film directed by D. W. Griffith

- Directed by: D. W. Griffith
- Written by: Emmett C. Hall
- Starring: Blanche Sweet
- Cinematography: G. W. Bitzer
- Distributed by: American Mutoscope and Biograph Company
- Release date: March 16, 1911
- Running time: 17 minutes
- Country: United States
- Language: Silent (English intertitles)

Was He a Coward? is a 1911 American short silent Western film directed by D. W. Griffith and starring Blanche Sweet. A print of the film survives in the film archive of the Museum of Modern Art.

== Cast ==
- Wilfred Lucas as Norris Hilton
- Joseph Graybill as Hilton's Friend
- W. Chrystie Miller as The Rancher
- Blanche Sweet as Kate, the Rancher's Daughter
- Dell Henderson as The Foreman
- Kate Toncray as The Maid
- Francis J. Grandon as The Doctor
- Guy Hedlund as An Indian

== See also ==
- D. W. Griffith filmography
- Blanche Sweet filmography
