= His Trust =

1911 film directed by D. W. Griffith

- Directed by: D. W. Griffith
- Written by: Emmett C. Hall
- Starring: Wilfred Lucas
- Cinematography: G. W. Bitzer
- Distributed by: Biograph Company
- Release date: January 16, 1911
- Running time: 14 minutes (18 frame/s)
- Country: United States
- Language: Silent (English intertitles)

His Trust is a 1911 American silent drama film directed by D. W. Griffith. It concerns "the faithful devotion and self-sacrifice of an old negro servant," who is played in blackface by Wilfred Lucas. The film's sequel is His Trust Fulfilled. Prints of the film survive in the film archives of the Museum of Modern Art and the Library of Congress.

== Cast ==
- Wilfred Lucas as George
- Dell Henderson as Col. Frazier
- Claire McDowell as Col. Frazier's wife
- Edith Haldeman as The Fraziers' child
- Linda Arvidson
- Dorothy Bernard
- Kate Bruce
- Adele DeGarde
- Gladys Egan
- Francis J. Grandon as Confederate soldier
- Joseph Graybill as Union soldier
- Guy Hedlund as Black servant
- Grace Henderson
- Harry Hyde
- Adolph Lestina as Black servant / Confederate soldier
- Jeanie MacPherson as Woman at farewell
- Violet Mersereau
- W. Chrystie Miller as Man at farewell
- Alfred Paget as Messenger / Confederate soldier
- Lottie Pickford as Woman at farewell
- Vivian Prescott as Woman at farewell
- W. C. Robinson as Union soldier
- Mack Sennett as Confederate soldier delivering sword / death notice
- Kate Toncray as Black servant (unconfirmed)
- Charles West as Man at farewell
- Dorothy West

== See also ==
- 1911 in film
- D. W. Griffith filmography
