= Marcia Harris =

American actress (1868–1947)

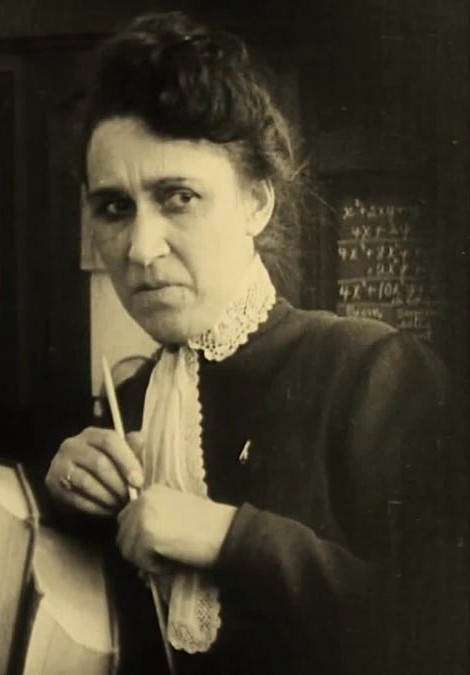
- Harris in The Poor Little Rich Girl (1917)
- Born: Lena Harris Hill; February 14, 1868; Providence, Rhode Island
- Died: June 18, 1947 (aged 79); Northampton, Massachusetts, U.S.
- Occupation: Actress
- Years active: 1905–1932

Marcia Harris (born Lena Hill, February 14, 1868 – June 18, 1947) was an American actress. A native of Providence, Rhode Island, she initially appeared as an amateur actress with the Chelsea Woman's Club in Chelsea, Massachusetts in the first years of the twentieth century under her married name Lena H. Burnett. In 1903-1904 she studied in acting in New York City, and began appearing on the stage as professional actress in 1905 using the stage name Marcia Harris. She appeared in both musicals and plays in American regional theatre and on Broadway. She also worked as a film actress; appearing in 48 films between 1915 and 1932.

== Early life and amateur actress ==
The daughter of George H. Hill and his wife Mary E. Hill, Lena Harris Hill was born in Providence, Rhode Island on February 14, 1868. She married William Burton Burnett on October 17, 1893 in Chelsea, Massachusetts. According to the 1900 United States Federal Census her husband was a plumber and tinsman, and the couple resided at that time with their young children, Marston and Edith, in Suffolk, Massachusetts.

Lena initially acted on the stage as an amateur with the Chelsea Woman's Club (CWC). She performed primarily male characters with this group; appearing as early as December 1900 under her her married name Lena H. Burnett as a male courtier in From Ye Court to Ye Colony at the Academy of Music in Chelsea, Massachusetts. She gave a dramatic reading with CWC at Boston's First Universalist Church in 1901, and in 1902 portrayed Joseph Surface in Richard Brinsley Sheridan's The School for Scandal at the Chelsea Academy of Music. Other plays she performed in with the CWC in Chelsea included Shakespeare's As You Like It (as Adam) in January 1903 and Hannah Cowley's The Belle's Stratagem in April 1903.

In January 1904 it was reported in The Boston Globe that Lena had in the recent past gone to New York City to train as a professional actress with her school's tuition being paid for by her father. She had returned home due to illness, and wanted to return to school in New York, but her husband refused to continue assisting with her food and lodging expenses. Lena sued her husband in civl court for support but was unsuccessful. Her decision to become a professional actress came at a social cost, and she was forced to resign her membership in the CWC.

== Professional career ==
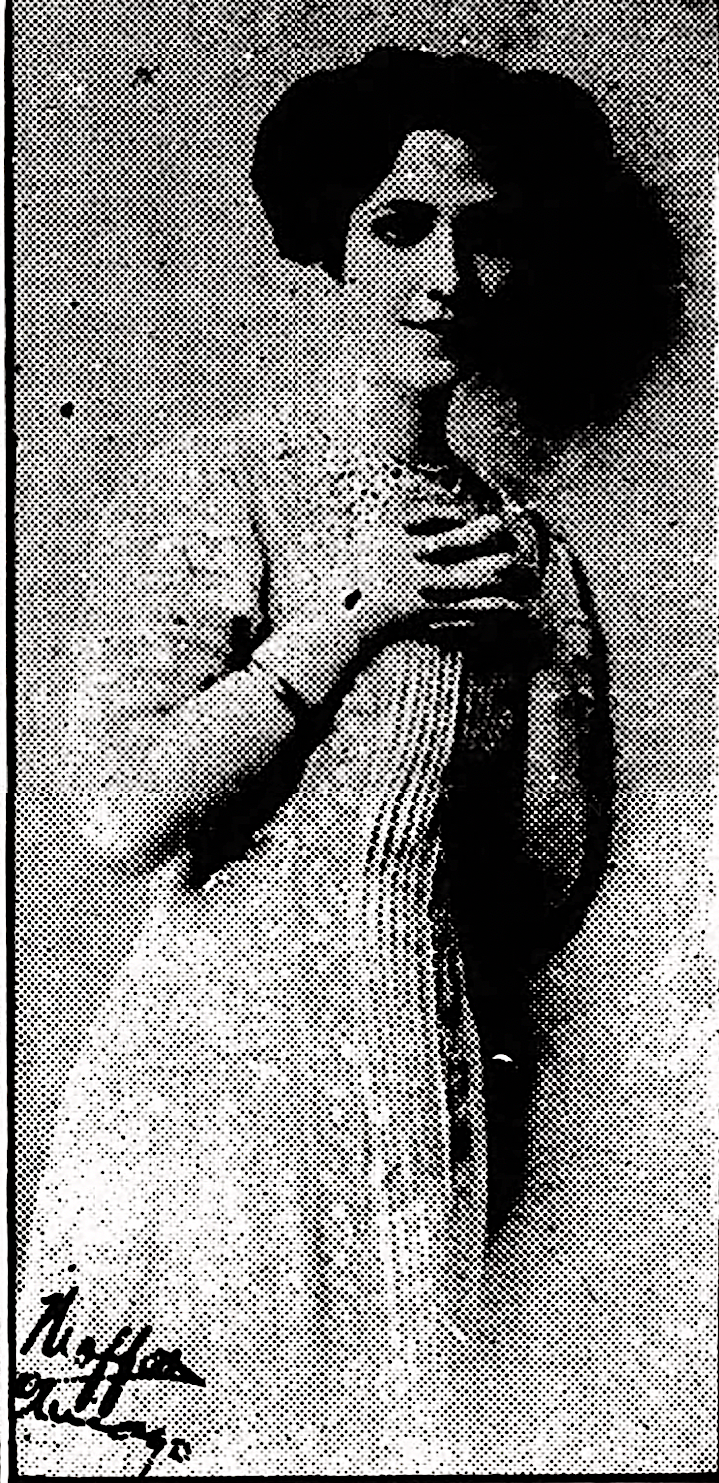
Marcia Harris. Published in 1912.

Lena adopted the stage name Marcia Harris; appearing as early as January 1905 under this name in variety theatre at the Hartford Opera House in Connecticut. In the 1905-1906 season she performed in a touring production of Hal Reid's play A Runaway Boy with a large cast led by Joseph Santley for performances at theaters in New Jersey, Pennsylvania, Delaware, Connecticut, Wisconsin, and Ontario, Canada. After this tour ended she performed with Al Haynes in the B. F. Keith Circuit in vaudeville as Cordelia in the sketch "Too Much Married" for performances in 1906 and 1907. In 1907 she also performed in vaudeville in the one act comedy A False Start by Ernest L. Waitt.

In 1907-1908 season Harris toured as Marie Dinglebender in Victor Herbert's operetta Dream City for performances in Wisconsin, Texas, Arkansas, Missouri, Pennsylvania, Minnesota, Montana, Washington state, Oregon, California, Utah, Colorado, Tennessee, Virginia, and British Columbia, Canada. In September 1908 she portrayed Mrs Eichorn in Mrs. Wiggs of the Cabbage Patch at the Lyceum Theatre in New London, Connecticut. She toured in this production in the 1908-1909 season to theaters in Massachusetts, Vermont, Maine, New York, Pennsylvania, New Jersey, In September 1909 she joined Joe Weber's company for a touring production of the musical parody The Merry Widow and The Devil by George V. Hobart; playing the role of Elsie Iceberg.

By January 1910 Harris was appearing in Raymond Hubbell's musical comedy The Midnight Sons with Lew Fields's company; making up one part of the show's comedy quartet whose other members included George W. Munroe, Harry Fisher, and Alan Brooks. The show at this time had just completed its lengthy Broadway run, and still had some of its original cast members in their roles. She took over the role of Lily Burns for the production's 1910 tour. She was still in this show as late as January 1911. Later that year she performed in Joe Weber's musical play Alma, Where Do You Live?, and portrayed the housekeeper Miranda Graves in Clara Louise Burnham's The Right Princess at the Ziegfeld Theater in Chicago.

In early 1912 Harris toured as Susan in Harry Sophus Sheldon's comedy A House Divided. After this she toured with comedy duo Murray & Mack in their show Casey Jones . In 1913 she portrayed Mrs. Van Haan in E. Ray Goetz's Broadway musical All Aboard at Lew Fields' 44th Street Roof Garden; a show she subsequently toured to New England in 1914. In 1915 she toured in the musical The Pink Lady, and performed in her first silent film, The Foundling, with Mary Pickford. In 1916 she returned to Broadway as Mrs. Shelvin in Maximilian Foster's Rich Man, Poor Man at the 48th Street Theatre, and starred opposite Ann Pennington in the Paramount Pictures film Susie Snowflake.

In 1917 Harris portrayed Alvina Starlight in the Broadway revival of George Broadhurst's What Happened to Jones at the 48th Street Theatre. That same year she appeared in several more films released by Paramount Pictures; including Great Expectations and The Little Boy Scout. In 1918 she appeared in the films Madame Jealousy and Prunella, and in 1919 she portrayed Marilla Cuthbert in the film version of Anne of Green Gables with Mary Miles Minter as Anne. In 1920 she performed the role of Mrs. Paddles in the Selznick Pictures film The Flapper, and in 1921 she appeared as Zaida Kent in A Heart to Let under film director Edward Dillon.

In 1923 Harris returned to Broadway as Mrs. One in Elmer Rice's The Adding Machine at the Garrick Theatre. She portrayed the landlady in the 1932 film Three Wise Girls.

Harris died in Northampton, Massachusetts at Dickinson Hospital on June 18, 1947. She is buried at Swan Point Cemetery in Providence, Rhode Island.

== Partial filmography ==
- The Foundling (1915)
- The Foundling (1916)
- Susie Snowflake (1916)
- Great Expectations (1917)
- The Poor Little Rich Girl (1917)
- Every Girl's Dream (1917)
- The Little Boy Scout (1917)
- Madame Jealousy (1918)
- Prunella (1918)
- Day Dreams (1919)
- The Bishop's Emeralds (1919)
- Kathleen Mavourneen (1919)
- Anne of Green Gables (1919)
- The Flapper (1920)
- The Right to Love (1920)
- Orphans of the Storm (1921)
- A Heart to Let (1921)
- The Girl from Porcupine (1921)
- Oh Mary Be Careful (1921)
- The Fighting Blade (1923)
- On the Banks of the Wabash (1923)
- The Truth About Wives (1923)
- Sinners in Heaven (1924)
- Isn't Life Wonderful (1924)
- Who's Cheating? (1924)
- Lena Rivers (1925)
- The King on Main Street (1925)
- Love 'Em and Leave 'Em (1926)
- So's Your Old Man (1926)
- Backstage (1927)
- The Music Master (1927)
- Take Me Home (1928)
- Brotherly Love (1928)
- The Squall (1929)
- The Greene Murder Case (1929)
- Young as You Feel (1931)
- Three Wise Girls (1932)
