= That Devil, Bateese =

1918 film

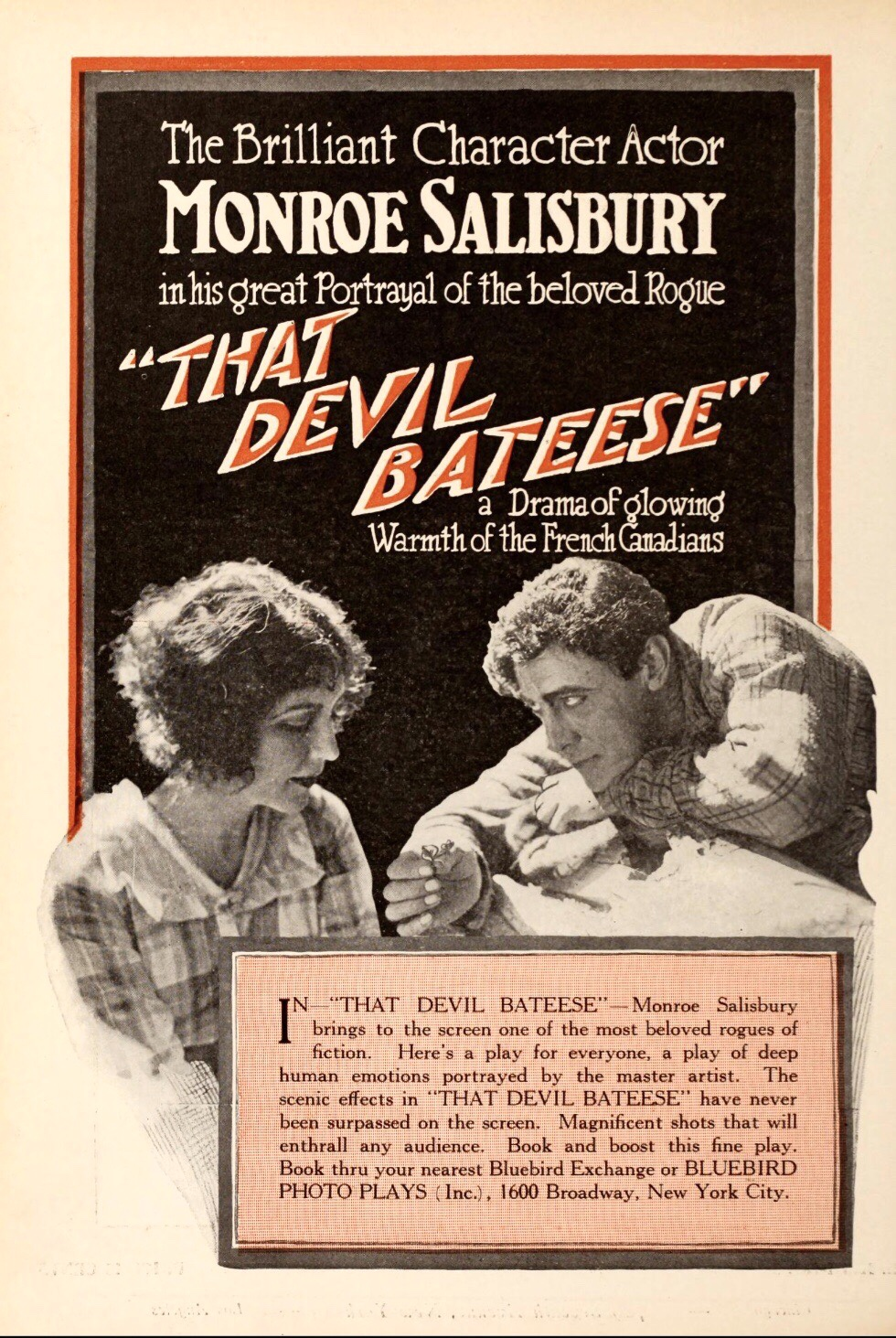
- Directed by: William Wolbert
- Written by: Bernard McConville (screenplay); Bess Meredyth (original short story)
- Produced by: Bluebird Photoplays
- Starring: Monroe Salisbury; Ada Gleason; Lon Chaney
- Cinematography: Charles R. Seeling
- Distributed by: Bluebird Photoplays
- Release date: September 2, 1918
- Running time: 5 reels (50 minutes)
- Country: United States
- Language: Silent (English intertitles)

That Devil, Bateese is a lost 1918 American silent action-drama film directed by William Wolbert and starring Monroe Salisbury, Ada Gleason, and Lon Chaney. The screenplay was written by Bernard McConville, based on a story written by Bess Meredyth. Even though this film was released before some of his earlier Universal films (Danger - Go Slow, The Talk of the Town, etc.), it was actually Chaney's final film from his first stint at Universal Studios. Filming took place at Big Bear Lake and the San Bernardino National Forest in California.

== Plot ==
Kathleen St. John of Montreal goes to the village of Montrouge in the North Woods to teach school and forget an unfortunate love affair with a man named Martin Stuart. After leaving the train station, she is attacked by a mountain man named Louis Courteau in the woods, and Bateese Latour, a local lumberjack, saves her from Courteau's unwanted embraces. Bateese is known in town as "That devil, Bateese" because he gets violent when he drinks.

Bateese falls madly in love with Kathleen himself, and he swears off drinking to get the young lady to marry him. Later, when her former lover, Martin Stuart, arrives in town looking for her, Bateese thinks that Kathleen still has strong feelings for Martin and in despair, Bateese tries to take his own life by intentionally steering his canoe over a waterfall.

Later, Louis Courteau's sister recognizes Martin Stuart as the groom who left her waiting at the altar years before (she still wears the wedding dress she wore on that dreadful day). When Kathleen hears how Martin ruined the poor woman's life, Kathleen returns to Bateese. It seems Bateese was injured in his fall, but he is still alive and on the mend. She helps him to return home, and the two wind up fervently in love.

== Cast ==
- Monroe Salisbury as Bateese Latour
- Adda Gleason as Kathleen St. John (credited as Ada Gleason)
- Lamar Johnstone as Martin Stuart
- Lon Chaney as Louis Courteau
- Andrew Robson as Father Pierre

== Reception ==
"Some excellent locations have been provided for the delineation of this tale, which is stronger in many ways than the average of its kind. There is considerable villainy of the obvious type, but on the other hand the characters ring true and really interesting." --- Moving Picture World

"Step out and get this Bluebird! I don't remember when I've seen a production where a one characterization stands out. The superb natural scenic backgrounds in the offering are remarkably beautiful throughout. Lon Chaney did a very effective bit of character work as the "willun".----Wid's Film Daily

== Censorship ==
Like many American films of the time, That Devil, Bateese was subject to cuts by city and state film censorship boards. For example, the Chicago Board of Censors required a cut, in Reel 4, of the intertitle "You marry — or not marry. I take you just the same."

== Preservation ==
With no holdings located in archives, That Devil, Bateese is considered a lost film.

== See also ==
- List of lost films
