= The Narrow Road (1912 film) =

1912 film

- Directed by: D. W. Griffith
- Written by: George Hennessy
- Produced by: Biograph Company
- Starring: Elmer Booth; Mary Pickford
- Cinematography: G. W. Bitzer
- Distributed by: General Film Company
- Release date: August 1, 1912
- Running time: 17 minutes
- Country: United States
- Language: Silent (English intertitles)

The Narrow Road is a 1912 American short silent drama film directed by D. W. Griffith and produced and distributed by the Biograph Company.

The film is preserved in the Library of Congress paperprint collection.

== Plot ==
Jim Holcomb and his friend are released from prison. Jim's wife waits for him, but his friend, a counterfeiter, wants Jim to return to crime. Jim refuses and takes a job at a lumber yard.

The friend resumes counterfeiting. When they meet at a bar, he again tries to recruit Jim, who is tempted but refuses. Plainclothes detectives follow them and later confiscate the counterfeit money the friend used to pay for drinks.

A detective tracks the counterfeiter to his room and brings a uniformed officer. When the counterfeiter doesn't answer their knocks, they break down the door, but he has escaped through the window. He flees to Jim's apartment with police in pursuit, convincing Jim to hide his suitcase of counterfeiting equipment before leaving.

Jim's wife argues with him about harboring the criminal. Police arrive and break in to search the apartment. Jim hides the suitcase in the bed, but two tramps had already entered through the bedroom window and stolen it. The police find nothing and leave.

The counterfeiter spots the tramps with his suitcase and fights to retrieve it, but the police arrive and arrest him. Jim returns to work at the lumber yard. When he finds the foreman's dropped wallet, he hesitates but returns it. A detective later questions the foreman, who tells him about Jim's honest act.

== Cast ==
- Elmer Booth as Jim Holcomb
- Mary Pickford as Mrs. Jim Holcomb
- Charles Hill Mailes as The Counterfeiter
- Jack Pickford
- W. Christy Cabanne as A Tramp
- Max Davidson as A Tramp
- Frank Evans as A Prison Guard
- Charles Gorman as A Detective
- Grace Henderson
- Harry Hyde
- J. Jiquel Lanoe as A Prisoner/The Foreman
- Adolph Lestina as A Bartender
- Alfred Paget as A Detective
- W. C. Robinson as A Prison Guard

== See also ==
- List of American films of 1912
- D. W. Griffith filmography
- Mary Pickford filmography
