= Ramona (1916 film) =

1916 film

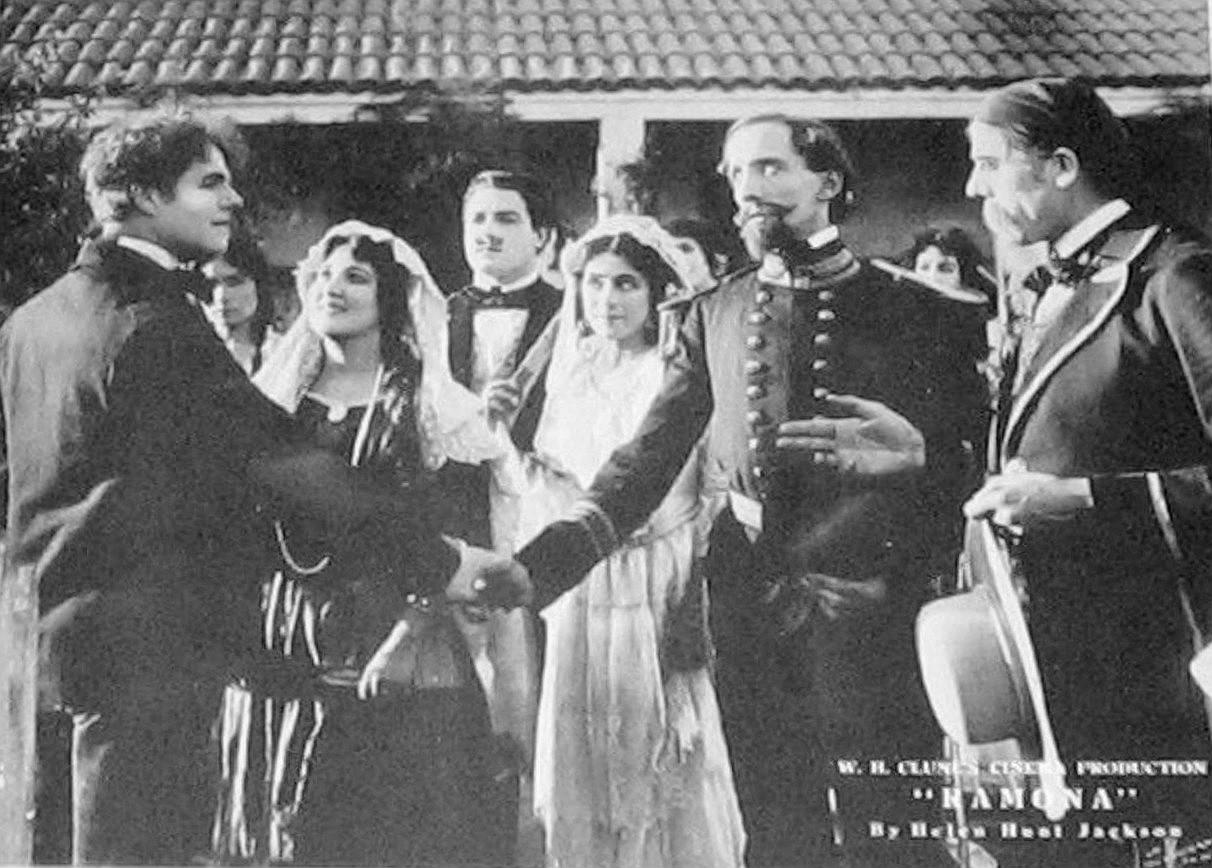
- Lobby card
- Directed by: Donald Crisp
- Based on: Ramona; 1884 novel by Helen Hunt Jackson
- Produced by: W. H. Clune
- Starring: Adda Gleason; Mabel Van Buren
- Cinematography: Bert Glennon; Enrique Juan Vallejo
- Production company: Clune Film Producing Company
- Distributed by: State's Rights basis
- Release date: April 5, 1916
- Running time: 10-14 reels
- Country: United States
- Language: Silent (English intertitles)

Ramona is a 1916 American silent drama film directed by Donald Crisp based on Helen Hunt Jackson's 1884 novel Ramona. The film's runtime is about three hours and is considered to be lost with only reel 5 preserved at the Library of Congress.

== Plot ==
The film opens to a ceremony occurring in Santa Barbara, California. Ramona Gonzaga (the title character's mother), a Native American woman, and Angus Phail (Richard Sterling), a white man, are getting married. Soon after their marriage, a half-Indian, half-White girl named Ramona (Mabel Van Buren) is born. Meanwhile, in another part of America, the film depicts land-hungry white settlers driving off Native Americans from their lands to occupy them.

The film cuts to Ramona (Ann Dvorak) growing up as a child, dearly loved by her mother. In this phase of Ramona's life, her mother passes away and gives Ramona to the care of Senora Moreno (Lurline Lyons) before her death. Ramona grows up in Senora Moreno's household with Felipe, Senora Moreno's son.

As Ramona (Adda Gleason) becomes a young woman, she becomes very beautiful with hair like her mother's, and eyes like her father's. She begins a relationship with Felipe (Nigel De Brulier). One day, Ramona sees a young Indian man named Alessandro (Monroe Salisbury), son of an Indian chief, playing the violin and meets him. They immediately fall in love with each other, but are discovered by Senora Moreno, who forbids them from seeing each other and locks Ramona in her room.

Alessandro goes back to his village, to find it burned down by white settlers. Despite his loss, he isn't too hurt by it due to his newfound love for Ramona. He goes back to Ramona's village and leaves with her. They get married in secret by Father Salvierderra (Martin Best) and move to the little settlement of San Pasqual, where they are able to live in peace for a while.

The film shows the white settlers moving closer and closer to San Pasqual, threatening the peace and quiet of Ramona's life. With this danger imminent, Ramona moves into the mountains with her family, which now consists of Alessandro, their young child, and a dog. While venturing in the mountains, Ramona and her family face many hardships, including a blizzard. However, they finally find a shelter.

Driven mad by the hardships his family has had to endure due to encroaching white settlers, Alessandro confronts a white man on horseback and is killed. Ramona is now alone with her child and her dog. Meanwhile, Felipe leaves his home to search for Ramona. After getting help along the way, Felipe finally finds Ramona and her family and brings them his home. Soon after, Ramona and Felipe get married and have several children, with the oldest of them named Ramona.

== Cast ==
- Adda Gleason as Ramona
- Mabel Van Buren as Ramona (in the prologue)
- Ann Dvorak as Ramona (age 4) (credited as Baby Anna Lehr)
- Monroe Salisbury as Alessandro
- Nigel De Brulier as Felipe Moreno (credited as N. de Brullier)
- Richard Sterling as Angus Phail
- Red Wing as His Wife (credited as Princess Red Wing)
- Lurline Lyons as Señora Moreno
- Alice Morton Otten as Starlight
- Donald Crisp as Jim Farrar (credited as James Needham)
- Alice Davenport as Marda (credited as Mrs. H. Davenport)
- E. Valencia as Juan Canito
- Martin Best as Father Salvierderra (credited as H.M. Best)
- Arthur Tavares as Lieutenant Francis Ortegna
- Beatrice Burnham

== Reception ==
The New York Times commended it for "excellent photography, a wealth of picturesque and carefully considered detail, good work by a multitudinous company," but complained that "no very stirring scenario was inspired by the long, uneventful stretches of the novel." The same article praised California as an "attractive and richly varied background for a movie romance" and praised it for its representation of Ramona from infant to child to grown woman.
