= The Livid Flame =

- Directed by: Francis J. Grandon
- Written by: William Wing
- Produced by: William N. Selig
- Starring: Earle Foxe; Lafayette McKee; Adda Gleason
- Production company: Selig Polyscope Company
- Distributed by: The General Film Company
- Release date: September 21, 1914
- Country: United States
- Language: Silent (English intertitles)

The Livid Flame is a 1914 American silent short drama directed by Francis J. Grandon and written by William Wing. The film stars Earle Foxe, Lafayette McKee and Adda Gleason. The film was produced by the Selig Polyscope Company.

== Synopsis ==
Burkhart, a prominent business man and the popular candidate for governor on the Citizens' ticket, becomes impressed with the ability of James McNair, a young attorney, and engages him to look after his legal business. He has a charming wife and little baby whom be loves devotedly. But the brilliant young lawyer has a weakness which he has successfully hidden from his wife and from his intimate associates. He has not taken a drink of liquor for several years because he realizes that if he once takes the first glass, he will become again a victim to its thralldom. One day while in company with Burkhart, they enter a café and Burkhart insists that McNair shall take a drink with the party. McNair declines and takes a cigar instead. However, Burkhart rallies him and jokes him until finally the young man tosses down a glassful of raw whiskey, and immediately the inclination for the stimulant returns. He staggers home intoxicated, to the great alarm and consternation of his wife, who never before has seen him in that condition. Day after day the same thing is repeated. Burkhart endeavors to argue with McNair and dissuade him from the indulgence that is making him day by day more unfit for the transaction of business. In his endeavors to rally young McNair from his downward path, Burkhart argues with him and tries to influence him to again become a man and stop drinking. Then McNair, realizing what it means to himself and to his wife, vehemently charges Burkhart with having started him on the downward path. Burkhart cannot fail to admit that the accusation is true. He writes a letter to the Citizens Committee to the effect that he cannot be a candidate for governor, and states that he is about to go away for reasons best known to himself.

Burkhart takes the young man into the wilderness, where he induces the young man to forget whiskey. McNair is frantic for liquor. Burkhart argues with him and even uses force to keep McNair from the bottle. In his own chamber Burkhart has a well-stocked cellarette containing various liquors. Young McNair has noted the cellarette which Burkhart has locked and carries the key in his pocket. One day, seeing the old colored servant drinking from a bottle, McNair snatches it from him and drains it. He does not sleep at night and in the daytime he wanders about the woods, a nervous wreck. One night he has a frightful dream. In a vision he sees himself enter the chamber of Burkhart, thirsting for alcohol, and with an axe, breaking open the cellarette. Then in the vision Burkhart enters and catches him in the act of draining a whiskey bottle. There is a struggle, and McNair sees himself raise the axe over the head of his devoted friend and knocking him to the floor. Then he sees himself, horror stricken and remorseful, dash out of the bungalow and pull a revolver from his pocket, placing it to his own temple and pulling the trigger. He next sees the old negro servant, awe stricken and frightened at the sight of the wounded man lying near the door, picks him up and carries him into the house. Then he sees the old negro lay him tenderly on the bed, when the vision changes into wakefulness and he is aroused by the touch of his friend, Burkhart, who shakes him by the shoulder. Then he realizes that it was all a dream. He springs to his feet and embraces his friend. He reads a letter from his wife, telling him of the ruin which has befallen Burkhart owing to his absence from business and his defeat as governor. He is a man again. He will not succumb to liquor in the future. He pledges himself to leave whiskey alone. Burkhart takes him home to his wife and baby. He has paid the price of his error and his conscience tells him he has done well.

== Cast ==
- Earle Foxe - James McNair
- Lafayette McKee - R. Hayes Burkhardt
- Charles Wheelock - Henderson
- Adda Gleason - Mrs. James McNair
- Roy Watson
- Philo McCullough
