= The Foundling (1915 film) =

1915 film by Allan Dwan, John B. O'Brien

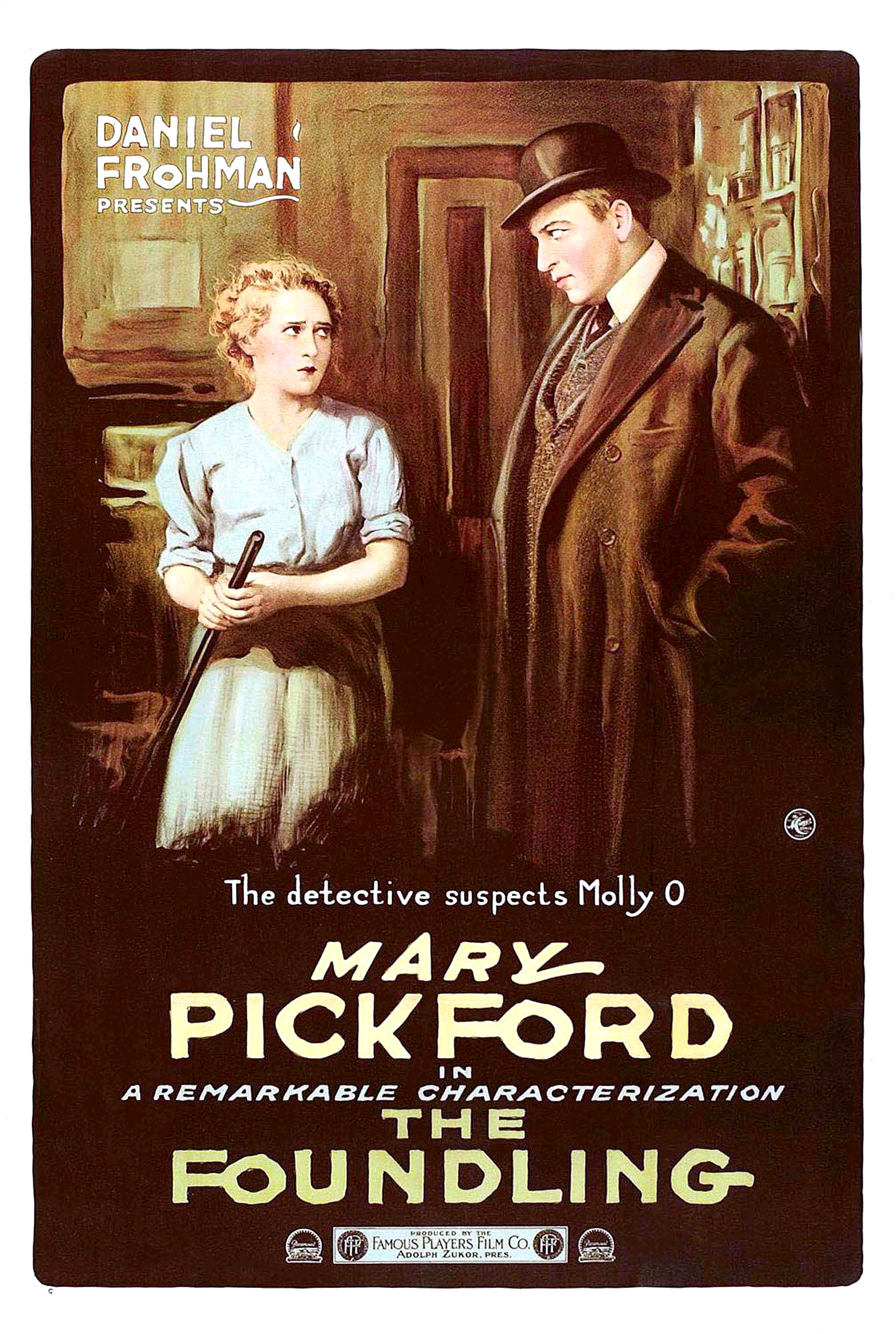
- Directed by: Alan Dwan
- Written by: Frances Marion
- Produced by: Mary Pickford
- Starring: Mary Pickford
- Distributed by: Paramount Pictures
- Release date: August 1915
- Running time: Five reels
- Country: United States
- Languages: Silent film English intertitles

The Foundling is a 1915 silent film directed by Alan Dwan. The film premiered in 1915, was lost in a fire accident shortly afterwards, and is now a lost film. It was remade as The Foundling in 1916 with the same principal cast, but with a different director, John B. O'Brien, at the helm.

== Plot ==
Molly O is a poor little girl whose mother died in childbirth and whose father David King rejects her. When David departs to Italy to paint his late wife as the Madonna, Molly O is left behind in a cruel orphanage. She is beloved by the other pupils, but becomes enemies with the matron's niece Jennie. As a result, she is shipped off to live with a boardinghouse proprietress. She is treated more like a slave than as an adopted daughter and decides to run away.

Meanwhile, King returned from Italy and is now a wealthy and successful painter. He regrets having left behind his daughter and now longs for her presence. Jennie pretends to be Molly O to make profit of his wealth and is adopted by him. However, Molly O returns as well. Afraid to tell the truth, she serves as his maid.

== Cast ==
- Mary Pickford - Molly O
- Edward Martindel - David King
- Maggie Weston - Mrs. Grimes
- Mildred Morris - Jennie
- Marcia Harris - Julia Ember
- Tammany Young - Crook
