= Life with Father (TV series) =

American TV sitcom (1953–1955)

- Title screen
- Genre: Drama
- Based on: Life with Father by Howard Lindsay and Russel Crouse
- Directed by: Fletcher Markle
- Starring: Leon Ames; Lurene Tuttle
- Country of origin: United States
- Original language: English

Production
- Executive producer: Fletcher Markle
- Production company: CBS Productions

Original release
- Network: CBS
- Release: 1953 – 1955

Life with Father is an American television sitcom that ran from 1953 to 1955. It starred Leon Ames as Clarence Day Sr. and Lurene Tuttle as his wife Lavinia. It began broadcasting in color in 1954, and was the first live color TV series for network television originating in Hollywood. The show was broadcast in color only once, on September 7, 1954 and was the first color broadcast to originate at CBS Television City.

It was based on the long-running Broadway play of the same name, which had been adapted into a 1947 film, based on New Yorker articles and books by Clarence Day reminiscing about his family in late-19th century New York City.

== Background ==
Life with Father debuted on Broadway in 1939 and ran for 3224 performances over eight years, making it the longest-running nonmusical play in Broadway history, and the longest-running play of any kind between 1947 and 1972. The Broadway production earned $5.8 million playing to 2.1 million people, and in addition to the Broadway production it was a popular regional theater presentation. While the show was playing on Broadway, 11 touring companies performed in 214 cities, earning $5 million from audiences of 3.7 million people.

== Production ==
The pilot was filmed in New York starring Dennis King and Martha Scott but CBS television decided to relocate the show to Hollywood and recast the leads. The half-hour show premiered on CBS on November 22, 1953. It was broadcast live from CBS Television City studios. The producer was Fletcher Markle, who produced the Studio One live anthology series. Katherine B. Day, widow of Clarence Day, was editorial advisor, as were Howard Lindsay and Russel Crouse, authors of the Broadway production. Ames and Tuttle were selected as the leads after 100 auditions and 30 on-camera tests, and 200 auditions were conducted to select the supporting cast. Pat Hitchcock, daughter of the director Alfred Hitchcock, appeared in the premiere as Nora, the maid; Dorothy Bernard recreated her Broadway performance as Margaret, the family cook.

== Cast ==
Premiere episode:

- Leon Ames as Clarence Day Sr.
- Lurene Tuttle as Lavinia
- Ralph Reed as Clarence Day Jr.
- Ronnie Keith as Whitney
- Harvey Grant as Harlan
- Freddie Leiston as John
- Dorothy Bernard as Margaret
- Pat Hitchcock as Nora

Replacement cast:

- Steven Terrell as Clarence Day Jr.
- B.G. Norman as Whitney
- Freddy Ridgeway as Whitney
- Malcolm Cassell as John
- Marion Ross as Nora

== Reception ==
Newsday columnist Jo Coppola harshly criticized the television adaptation, saying "Even when the industry gets its hands on superior material, the end result is rotten." She called the script "inept, implausible and routine," and said that Ames character emerges as a "rude, bumbling and arrogant man" and lacking in the original production's warmth and humor. New York Times reviewer Jack Gould called the premiere episode a "tawdry and pedestrian Hollywood farce in the worst video tradition," and described the title character as a "monstrous caricature of the original."

Mary Cremmen, the Boston Globe television columnist, observed that the Ames' first performances "exaggerated the raving, explosive aspects of the Father far more than we ever recalled seeing on stage," but that his characterization had "mellowed considerably" by the December 27, 1953 program. Gould expressed similar views in a February 1954 review, saying that the show has "retrieved itself splendidly" and praised Ames' performance, saying "there is now the warmth and characterization vital to faithful interpretation of the Clarence Day Jr. stories."

A Times review of the 1954 season premiere criticized the writing, but called the series "one of the more sensible shows about family life."
