= The Adventures of Kathlyn =

1913 film

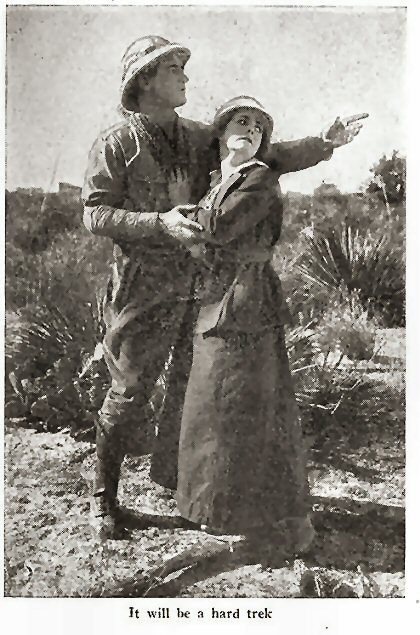
- The Adventures of Kathlyn (1914 book)
- Directed by: Francis J. Grandon
- Written by: Harold MacGrath; Gilson Willets
- Starring: Kathlyn Williams
- Distributed by: Selig Polyscope Company
- Release date: 1913
- Country: United States

The Adventures of Kathlyn (1913) is an American motion picture serial released on December 29, 1913, by the Selig Polyscope Company. An adventure serial filmed in Chicago, Illinois, its thirteen episodes were directed by Francis J. Grandon from a story by Harold MacGrath and Gilson Willets and starred Kathlyn Williams as the heroine. Harold MacGrath's novel of the same title was released a few days later in January 1914, so as to be in book stores at the same time as the serial was playing in theaters.

The Adventures of Kathlyn was the second serial ever made by an American film studio, and is considered to be the first of the cliffhanger serials that became enormously popular during the next decade.

The success of the serial spawned a 1916 feature-length film of the same title with basically the same crew and cast.

== Production ==
The serial came about due to a newspaper circulation war in Chicago that forced the Chicago Tribune to use more sensationalism. William Selig, noting the popularity of serial fiction in newspapers and magazines, took the idea of a film serial to the newspaper. Despite the Tribune being in favor of abolishing nickelodeons only 5 years previously, Tribune editor James Keeley agreed and the serial was released as a promotional project. The chapters of the film were released biweekly and the story was also printed as a newspaper serial in the Tribune and other newspapers including the Los Angeles Times.

Although the first American film serial was What Happened to Mary, The Adventures of Kathlyn is a more important piece of film history, being the first serial to use cliffhangers as the ending of its chapters—and thus the first recognizable film serial. Frank Leon Smith, in a letter to Films in Review (February 1958), wrote that the cliffhanger ending of chapter one "was a 'situation' ending, but other episodes wound up with sensational action or stunts, broken for holdover suspense...gave the serial both the key to its success and the assurance of its doom".

The Adventures of Kathlyn used animals from the Selig Zoo, and had more action than What Happened to Mary. The Tribune announced a 10% increase in circulation as a result of the film serial's success.

== Preservation status ==
The film is now considered to be a lost film. According to silentera.com, however, the Cineteca del Friuli film archive has the first episode and the EYE Film Institute Netherlands possesses print fragments. Footage from the EYE film collection was uploaded onto YouTube in 2018.

== Chapter titles ==
1. The Adventures of Kathlyn
2. The Two Ordeals
3. The Temple of the Lion
4. A Royal Slave
5. A Colonel in Chains
6. Three Bags of Silver
7. The Garden of Brides
8. The Cruel Crown
9. The Spellbound Multitude
10. A Warrior Maid
11. The Forged Parchment
12. The King's Will
13. The Court of Death
