= Leon Ames =

American actor (1902–1993)

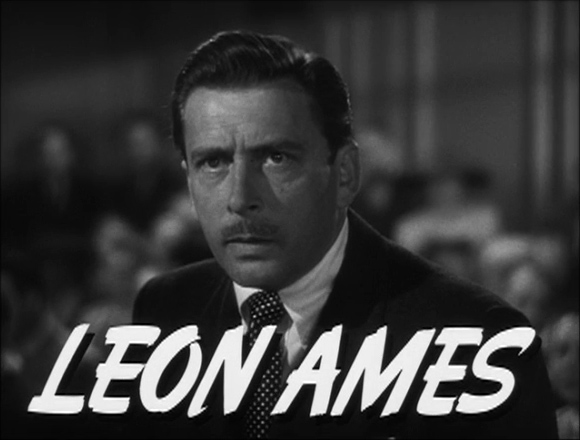
- Ames in the trailer for The Postman Always Rings Twice (1946)
- Born: Harry Leon Wycoff; January 20, 1902; Portland, Indiana, U.S.
- Died: October 12, 1993 (aged 91); Laguna Beach, California, U.S.
- Resting place: Forest Lawn Memorial Park, Hollywood Hills
- Other name: Leon Waycoff
- Occupation: Actor
- Years active: 1931–1986
- Spouse: Christine Gossett (m. 1938)
- Children: 3

President of the Screen Actors Guild
- In office 1957–1958
- Preceded by: Walter Pidgeon
- Succeeded by: Howard Keel

Leon Ames (born Harry Leon Wycoff; January 20, 1902 – October 12, 1993) was an American film and television actor. He is best remembered for playing father figures in such films as Meet Me in St. Louis (1944), Little Women (1949), On Moonlight Bay (1951), and By the Light of the Silvery Moon (1953). His best-known dramatic role may have been in the crime film The Postman Always Rings Twice (1946).

== Early years ==
Leon Ames was born Harry Leon Wycoff on January 20, 1902, in Portland, Indiana, to Charles Elmer Wycoff and Cora Alice (DeMoss) Wycoff. Some sources list his original last name as Wykoff or Waycoff, and in his early films, he acted under the name of Leon Waycoff. In 1935, Ames explained that he had changed his name because Waycoff was often misspelled and mispronounced. Ames was his mother's maiden name.

In the 1910 census, when his family was residing in Fowler, Indiana, Ames' name was given as Harry L. Wycoff and his father was listed as a manager of a meat market. During World War I, Ames served in the field artillery of the U.S. Army and later in the flying corps (the Army Air Service).

== Stage ==
Ames' involvement with entertainment began when he worked as a stage manager for the Charles K. Champlin Theatre Company. He ventured into acting with the group and progressed to the lead in a production of Tomorrow and Tomorrow in Los Angeles. He acted for three years with the Stuart Walker Stock Company in Cincinnati.

Ames debuted on Broadway in It Pays to Sin (1933). His other Broadway credits include Howie (1958), Winesburg, Ohio, (1958), Slightly Married (1943), The Russian People (1942), Little Darling (1942), Guest in the House (1942), The Land Is Bright (1941), The Male Animal (1940), Thirsty Soil (1937), A House in the Country (1937), and Bright Honor (1936).

== Film ==
Ames made his film debut in Quick Millions in 1931. During the 1940s, he was under contract to Metro-Goldwyn-Mayer (MGM). Among his important roles at MGM was his portrayal of Mr. Smith in the studio's 1944 hit film Meet Me in St. Louis.

Ames was also featured in The Postman Always Rings Twice (1946), portraying district attorney Kyle Sackett. He appeared in the Doris Day-Gordon MacRae film On Moonlight Bay (1951), its sequel By the Light of the Silvery Moon (1953), Peyton Place (1957), and From the Terrace (1960).

In the 1961 Walt Disney comedy The Absent-Minded Professor, Ames played college president Rufus Daggett. He reprised the role in the film's 1963 sequel, Son of Flubber. In 1970, he was cast as Secretary of the Navy Frank Knox in the action war film Tora! Tora! Tora! His last screen role occurred in Peggy Sue Got Married (1986), playing the grandfather of Kathleen Turner's character.

== Radio and television ==
Ames' first radio broadcast was in January 1942 on Grand Central Station.

Ames' television roles included leads in the adaptations of Life with Father (1953–55) and Father of the Bride (1961–62). His role in the latter was soon expanded because he had become the series' dominant character. Ames played the general practitioner on the series My Three Sons, as titled "Dr. Osborne, M.D." in season 9, episode 14, in 1968, when Katie and Robbie were deciding on a physician to care for her during her pregnancy; Dr. Osborne had a call from the hospital stating he had an expectant mother awaiting him as he was checking in on Katie at the Douglas home. They decided Dr. Osborne was the best for their first child (who turned out to be triplets).

Ames had the title role of Judge John Cooper in the syndicated series Frontier Judge and played Howard McMann on Bewitched. He joined the cast of Mister Ed (1963–66) as a neighbor, following the death of actor Larry Keating. Ames also appeared in episodes of the NBC anthology series The Barbara Stanwyck Show and on the short-lived CBS legal drama Storefront Lawyers. He played a grandfather in the 1975 The Jeffersons episode "Jenny’s Grandparents".

== Other professional activities ==
Ames was a founder of the Screen Actors Guild in 1933, and he served as its president in 1957. During the 1960s, Ames owned several Ford dealerships in California.

== Personal life ==
Ames was the father of Robert Fletcher, who was left with his mother when Ames and she split up in 1923.

Ames wed actress Christine Gossett in 1938. The couple had a daughter, Shelley (b. 1940), and a son, Leon (b. 1943). Christine retired early from acting to raise their family. They remained married until Ames' death in 1993.

Ames supported Barry Goldwater in the 1964 United States presidential election.

== Kidnapping ==
On February 12, 1964, Ames and his wife were held hostage in their home by an intruder who demanded $50,000 before he would free them. Ames called his business partner, who obtained the money from a bank and delivered it to the house as instructed. After inspecting the cash, the kidnapper left Ames in the house, bound with tape, and instructed Mrs. Ames to drive him in the couple's car. He also forced both the business partner and a guest in the Ames house into the trunk. Eventually, police (who had been alerted by the partner while he was picking up the money) surrounded the car and freed the hostages.

== Death ==
On October 12, 1993, Ames died at the age of 91 in Laguna Beach, California, of complications after suffering a stroke. His gravesite is at Forest Lawn, Hollywood Hills Cemetery in Los Angeles.

== Recognition ==
In 1980, after 50 years in show business, Ames received the Screen Actors Guild Life Achievement Award.

== Filmography ==
- Quick Millions (1931) as Hood (as Leon Waycoff)
- Cannonball Express (1932) as Jack Logan (as Leon Waycoff)
- Murders in the Rue Morgue (1932) as Pierre Dupin (as Leon Waycoff)
- Stowaway (1932) as Tommy (as Leon Waycoff)
- State's Attorney (1932) as First Trial Prosecutor (uncredited)
- The Famous Ferguson Case (1932) as Judd Brooks (as Leon Waycoff)
- Thirteen Women (1932) (scenes cut)
- A Successful Calamity (1932) as Barney Davis - Witon's Junior Associate (as Leon Waycoff)
- That's My Boy (1932) as Al Williams (as Leon Waycoff)
- Uptown New York (1932) as Max Silver (as Leon Waycoff)
- Silver Dollar (1932) as Yates' Secretary (uncredited)
- Parachute Jumper (1933) as Pilot with Alabama (uncredited)
- Forgotten (1933) as Louie Strauss (as Leon Waycoff)
- Alimony Madness (1933) as John Thurman (as Leon Waycoff)
- The Man Who Dared (1933) as (as Leon Waycoff)
- Ship of Wanted Men (1933) as Capt. John Holden (as Leon Waycoff)
- Only Yesterday (1933) as Lee (uncredited)
- The Crosby Case (1934) as Clifford Mulford (uncredited)
- I'll Tell the World (1934) as Spud Marshall (as Leon Waycoff)
- Now I'll Tell (1934) as Max (as Leon Waycoff)
- The Count of Monte Cristo (1934) as Beauchamp (uncredited)
- Mutiny Ahead (1935) as McMurtrie
- Rescue Squad (1935) as Lester Vaughn (as Leon Waycoff)
- Reckless (1935) as Ralph Watson (as Leon Waycoff)
- Strangers All (1935) as Frank Walker
- Get That Man (1935) as Don Clayton / McDonald (as Leon Waycoff)
- Death in the Air (1936) as Carl Goering
- Song of Revolt (1937, Short) as Claude Joseph Rouget de Lisle
- Soak the Poor (1937, Short) as Special Investigator Stanton
- Charlie Chan on Broadway (1937) as Buzz Moran
- Dangerously Yours (1937) as Phil
- Murder in Greenwich Village (1937) as Rodney Hunter
- 45 Fathers (1937) as Vincent
- The Spy Ring (1938) as Frank Denton
- International Settlement (1938) as Monte Silvers
- Walking Down Broadway (1938) as Frank Gatty
- Bluebeard's Eighth Wife (1938) as Ex-Chauffeur (uncredited)
- Island in the Sky (1938) as Marty Butler
- Come On, Leathernecks! (1938) as Otto Wagner / Baroni
- Mysterious Mr. Moto (1938) as Paul Brissac
- Suez (1938) as Napoleon III - Emperor of France
- Cipher Bureau (1938) as Maj. Philip Waring
- Strange Faces (1938) as Joe Gurney
- Secrets of a Nurse (1938) as Joe Largo
- Mr. Sheldon Goes to Town (1939 short) as Salesman
- Risky Business (1939) as Hinge Jackson
- Blackwell's Island (1939) as County Prosecutor Ballinger (uncredited)
- I Was a Convict (1939) as Jackson
- Panama Patrol (1939) as Maj. Phillip Waring
- Mr. Moto in Danger Island (1939) as Commissioner Madero
- Code of the Streets (1939) as "Chick" Foster
- Man of Conquest (1939) as John Hoskins
- Help Wanted (1939, Short) as J. T. Evans - Labor Commissioner (uncredited)
- Fugitive at Large (1939) as Carter
- Thunder Afloat (1939) as Recruiting Officer (uncredited)
- Calling All Marines (1939) as Murdock
- Pack Up Your Troubles (1939) as Adjutant
- The Marshal of Mesa City (1939) as Sheriff Jud Cronin
- Legion of Lost Flyers (1939) as Smythe
- East Side Kids (1940) as Pat O'Day
- No Greater Sin (1941) as Dr. Edward Cavanaugh
- Ellery Queen and the Murder Ring (1941) as John Stack
- Crime Doctor (1943) as William Wheeler
- The Iron Major (1943) as Robert 'Bob' Stewart
- Thirty Seconds Over Tokyo (1944) as Lieut. Jurika
- The Thin Man Goes Home (1945) as Edgar Draque
- Meet Me in St. Louis (1944) as Mr. Alonzo Smith
- Between Two Women (1945) as Mr. Masters (uncredited)
- Fall Guy (1945 short) as Floyd Parkson
- Son of Lassie (1945) as Anton
- Anchors Aweigh (1945) as Admiral's Aide
- Week-End at the Waldorf (1945) as Henry Burton
- Yolanda and the Thief (1945) as Mr. Candle
- They Were Expendable (1945) as Major James Morton
- The Postman Always Rings Twice (1946) as Kyle Sackett
- No Leave, No Love (1946) as Colonel Elliott
- The Cockeyed Miracle (1946) as Ralph Humphrey
- The Show-Off (1946) as Frank Harlin
- The Great Morgan (1946) as K.F. Studio Exec
- Lady in the Lake (1947) as Derace Kingsby
- Undercover Maisie (1947) as Amor aka Willis Farnes
- Song of the Thin Man (1947) as Mitchell Talbin
- The Amazing Mr. Nordill (1947, Short) as Everett Nordill, aka Everton
- Merton of the Movies (1947) as Lawrence Rupert
- Alias a Gentleman (1948) as Matt Enley
- On an Island with You (1948) as Commander Harrison
- The Velvet Touch (1948) as Gordon Dunning
- A Date with Judy (1948) as Lucien T. Pringle
- Little Women (1949) as Mr. March
- Any Number Can Play (1949) as Dr. Palmer
- Scene of the Crime (1949) as Capt. A.C. Forster
- Battleground (1949) as The Chaplain
- Ambush (1950) as Maj. C.E. Breverly
- The Big Hangover (1950) as Carl Bellcap
- The Skipper Surprised His Wife (1950) as Dr. Philip Abbott
- Crisis (1950) as Sam Proctor
- The Happy Years (1950) as Samuel H. Stover - Sr.
- Dial 1119 (1950) as Earl
- Watch the Birdie (1950) as Grantland D. Farns
- On Moonlight Bay (1951) as George Winfield
- Cattle Drive (1951) as Chester Graham Sr.
- It's a Big Country (1951) as Secret Service Man
- Angel Face (1952) as Fred Barrett
- By the Light of the Silvery Moon (1953) as George Winfield
- Let's Do It Again (1953) as Chet Stuart
- Sabre Jet (1953) as Lt. Col. George Eckert
- Engagement Party (1956 short) as Elliott Winston
- Peyton Place (1957) as Mr. Harrington
- From the Terrace (1960) as Samuel Eaton
- New Comedy Showcase (1960, TV series, Season 1 Episode 5: "Maggie") as Mark Bradley
- The Absent-Minded Professor (1961) as President Rufus Daggett
- Son of Flubber (1963) as President Rufus Daggett
- The Misadventures of Merlin Jones (1964) as Judge Holmsby / Lex Fortas
- The Monkey's Uncle (1965) as Judge Holmsby
- On a Clear Day You Can See Forever (1970) as Burt Clews
- Tora! Tora! Tora! (1970) as Frank Knox
- Toklat (1971) as Old Man / Narrator
- Hammersmith Is Out (1972) as General Sam Pembroke
- Brother of the Wind (1973) as Narrator (voice)
- The Meal (1975) as Bernard Wallace Kroger
- Timber Tramps (1975) as Deacon
- Sherlock Holmes in New York (1976, TV Movie) as Daniel Furman
- Claws (1977) as Ben Jones, Forest Commissioner
- The Best Place to Be (1979, TV Movie) as William Callahan
- Just You and Me, Kid (1979) as Manduke the Magnificent
- Testament (1983) as Henry Abhart
- Jake Speed (1986) as Pop Winston
- Peggy Sue Got Married (1986) as Barney Alvorg (final film role)

== Partial television credits ==
- Life with Father (1953–1955) as Clarence Day Sr.
- Westinghouse Studio One (1958), episode "Tongue of Angels" as Cyrus Walker
- General Electric Theater (1960), episode "Adam's Apples" as Malcolm Fownes
- Father of the Bride (1961–1962) as Stanley Banks
- Mister Ed (1963–1965) as Gordon Kirkwood
- The Beverly Hillbillies Season 5, Episodes 4 and 5 as Colonel Foxhall
- The Andy Griffith Show (Season 7, Episode 9, 1966) as Mr. Hampton
- My Three Sons (Season 9, Episode 2, 1968) as Dr. Osborne
- Bewitched (Season 6, Episode 21, 1970), episode "What Makes Darrin Run?" as Howard McMann
- The Ghost & Mrs. Muir (Season 2, Episode 24, 1970), episode "Wedding Day?????" as Bradford Williams
- The Jeffersons (Season 2, Episode 10, 1975) as Grandpa Willis in the episode “Jenny’s Grandparents.”
- Emergency! (Season 6, Episode 22, 1977) as Dr. Ned Tuttle in the episode "Upward and Onward"
- The Littlest Hobo (Season 1, Episode 8, 1979), episode "Heritage" as Jasper McGillicutty

== See also ==
- List of kidnappings

Awards and achievements
Preceded by Katharine Hepburn	Screen Actors Guild Life Achievement Award; 1980	Succeeded by Danny Kaye
