= The Modern Prodigal =

1910 short film directed by D. W. Griffith

- Directed by: D. W. Griffith
- Written by: Dell Henderson
- Based on: novel by Bess Meredyth
- Cinematography: G. W. Bitzer
- Production company: Biograph Company
- Distributed by: Biograph Company
- Release date: August 29, 1910 (U.S.)
- Running time: 17 minutes
- Country: United States
- Language: Silent (English intertitles)

The Modern Prodigal is a 1910 American short drama silent black-and-white film directed by D. W. Griffith. It is based on a novel by Bess Meredyth.

== Cast ==
- Guy Hedlund as The Prodigal Son
- Clara T. Bracy as The Prodigal's Mother
- George Nichols as The Sheriff
- Kate Bruce as The Sheriff's Wife
- Jack Pickford as The Sheriff's Son
- William J. Butler as A Farmer
- Edward Dillon as Guard
- Frank Evans as Guard
- Francis J. Grandon as At Post Office
- Robert Harron as At Post Office
- Dell Henderson as At Post Office
- James Kirkwood Sr.
- W. Chrystie Miller
- Anthony O'Sullivan as At Farewell
- Alfred Paget as Guard
- Lester Predmore as One of the Boys Swimming
- Mack Sennett
