= The Country Lovers =

1911 film

- Directed by: Mack Sennett
- Written by: Frank E. Woods
- Starring: Blanche Sweet; Charles West; Grace Henderson; Mack Sennett
- Production company: Biograph Company
- Distributed by: The General Film Company
- Release date: May 11, 1911
- Country: United States
- Languages: Silent; English intertitles

The Country Lovers is a 1911 American short silent comedy film written by Frank E. Woods, and directed by Mack Sennett. The film stars Blanche Sweet, Charles West, Grace Henderson and Mack Sennett.

It is a Biograph Company production, and distributed by The General Film Company. It was released in the United States on May 11, 1911 to mixed reviews.

== Plot ==
These two farm boys imagined that the best way to make an impression upon their sweethearts was to pose as heroes, and so they schemed. The plan they adopt is getting an old suit of clothing stuffed out with straw, and placing it under a bush with the booted feet protruding, to appear as if a man were sleeping there. It looks sinister enough and frightens the girls when they pass the spot.

The girls rush off and tell the boys, who armed with a rifle go to meet the intruder, but meanwhile Happy Jack, the tramp, has happened along, and appropriating the clothes, takes the place of the dummy, showing distinct signs of life at the approach of the would-be heroes. The movement of the supposed inanimate figure throws the boys into a panic of fright, and dropping their gun they make tracks for the house to the disgust of the girls.

== Cast ==
- Blanche Sweet
- Charles West
- Grace Henderson
- Mack Sennett

== Reviews ==
The Moving Picture World was negative in their review, saying: "a very good chance was wasted in this film. It is theatrical and almost wholly unconvincing as it is. The personality of the six who act it is pleasing; but they have little chance to give human characterization to their parts. There is an amateurish tramp is the story. Still, now and then, the actors manage to bring out a ripple of laughter as the reel is being projected."

Motography was positive in their review of the film, saying: "Biograph tried a risky experiment with this film and got away with it. The climax comes not far beyond the middle of the film and the remaining several hundred feet are obliged to work up a new set of complications leading to another climax. All that saves it from bedragglement is the fact that the second climax is funnier than the first. Few producers would have dared to take the risk, avoiding anti-climax like dynamite. It is a curious method of padding a film, dangerous in most cases, but successful enough here. The plot develops several amusing situations which are good for a number of laughs."

== See also ==
- List of American films of 1911
- Blanche Sweet filmography

== Sources ==
- Bennett, Carl (March 18, 2010). "Progressive Silent Film List: The Country Lovers". Silent Era.
- "Stories of the Films". Moving Picture World. Vol. 8, no. 19. The World Photographic Publishing Company. May 13, 1911.
- "Comments On The Films: Country Lovers Biograph". Moving Picture World. Vol. 8, no. 22. The World Photographic Publishing Company. June 3, 1911.
- "Recent Films Reviewed: The Country Lovers". Motography. Vol. 5, no. 6. Electricity Magazine Corporation. June 1911.
