= What Shall We Do with Our Old? =

1911 film directed by D. W. Griffith

- Directed by: D. W. Griffith
- Starring: W. Chrystie Miller
- Cinematography: G. W. Bitzer
- Distributed by: Biograph Company
- Release date: February 13, 1911
- Running time: 15 minutes (994 feet on release)
- Country: United States
- Language: Silent (English intertitles)

What Shall We Do with Our Old? is a 1911 American silent drama film directed by D. W. Griffith.

What Shall We Do With Our Old? (1911)

== Cast ==
- W. Chrystie Miller as The Old Carpenter
- Claire McDowell as The Old Carpenter's Wife
- Adolph Lestina as The Doctor
- George Nichols as The Judge
- Elmer Booth as Assaulted Prisoner
- William J. Butler as In Shop
- Donald Crisp as Night Court Bailiff
- Edward Dillon as In Shop
- John T. Dillon as In Shop / In Jail
- Frank Evans as In Court
- Francis J. Grandon as Policeman
- Guy Hedlund as Young Carpenter in Shop / In Court
- J. Jiquel Lanoe as In Court
- Wilfred Lucas as Angry Prisoner
- Alfred Paget as In Shop
- Vivian Prescott as In Court
- W. C. Robinson as In Shop
- Charles West

== See also ==
- 1911 in film
- D. W. Griffith filmography
