= In the Border States =

1910 film directed by D. W. Griffith

- Full film
- Directed by: D. W. Griffith
- Written by: Stanner E.V. Taylor
- Starring: Charles West
- Cinematography: G. W. Bitzer
- Distributed by: Biograph Company
- Release date: June 13, 1910
- Running time: 17 minutes (16 frame/s) (990 feet)
- Country: United States
- Language: Silent (English intertitles)

In the Border States is a 1910 American drama film directed by D. W. Griffith and set in the American Civil War. Prints of the film survive in the film archives of the Museum of Modern Art and the Library of Congress.

== Plot ==
A Union Army corporal, a "young father", bids farewell to his wife and daughters to march off to war. Nearby, three Confederate soldiers, foraging for food, are surprised and shot at by Union soldiers. They flee. One throws away his weapon and stumbles upon the youngest daughter of the corporal. She is about to scream, but instead takes pity on the man and lets him drink water from a bucket next to a well. He hides in the well, and the girl does not betray him to the Union pursuers. The man gets away.

Meanwhile, the young father is given a document and sent on a "perilous errand". He shoots a Confederate sentry and gets through enemy lines, but is shot and hunted. He makes his way to his own home. Only two young daughters are there. The elder daughter runs for help, leaving the youngest to watch over their father. He has her bring a candle so he can burn the document. The Confederates arrive, following a trail of blood. By chance the Confederate who was rescued by the youngest daughter is one of them. He breaks into the bedroom. The daughter shoots at him, but misses. He sees the burnt document and is about to bash in the father's head with his weapon when he recognizes the daughter. He covers the father with a quilt and tells the other Confederates he is dead. After the others leave, he tries to kiss the girl, but she will have none of that; instead they shake hands and exchange salutes. Union soldiers arrive later with a doctor.

== Cast ==
- Charles West as Young Father
- Charles Arling
- William J. Butler as Confederate Soldier
- Verner Clarges as Union Officer
- Edward Dillon as Confederate Soldier
- John T. Dillon as Union Soldier (as Jack Dillon)
- Gladys Egan as Younger Sister
- Frank Evans as Confederate Soldier
- Francis J. Grandon as Surgeon
- Guy Hedlund as Confederate Soldier
- Dell Henderson as Union Officer
- Henry Lehrman as Union Soldier
- W. Chrystie Miller as Grandfather at Farewell
- Owen Moore
- Alfred Paget as Union Soldier
- Mack Sennett as Union Soldier
- Henry B. Walthall as Confederate Corporal
- Dorothy West as Union Maiden at Farewell

== See also ==
- List of American films of 1910
