= Pat Hitchcock =

British-American actress and producer (1928–2021)

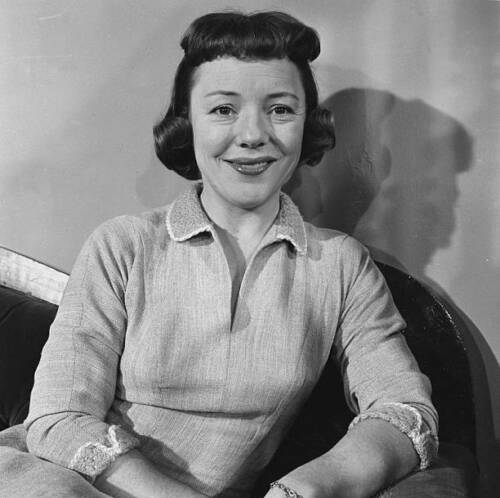
- Hitchcock in 1958
- Born: Patricia Alma Hitchcock; 7 July 1928; London, England
- Died: 9 August 2021 (aged 93); Thousand Oaks, California, US
- Occupations: Actress, producer
- Years active: 1950–2008
- Spouse: Joseph E. O'Connell Jr. (m. 1952; died 1994)
- Children: 3
- Parents: Alfred Hitchcock (father); Alma Reville (mother)
- Relatives: Joseph E. O'Connell (father-in-law)

Patricia Alma Hitchcock O'Connell (7 July 1928 – 9 August 2021) was a British-American actress and producer. She was the only child of English director Alfred Hitchcock and film editor Alma Reville, and had small roles in several of her father's films, with her most substantial appearance being in Strangers on a Train (1951).

== Early life ==
Hitchcock was born on 7 July 1928 in London, the only child of film director Alfred Hitchcock and film editor Alma Reville. The family moved to Los Angeles in 1939.

As a child, Hitchcock knew she wanted to be an actress, and made her first onscreen appearance as an uncredited extra alongside her mother in Sabotage (1936). In the early 1940s, she began acting on the stage and doing summer stock. Her father helped her gain a role in the Broadway production of Solitaire (1942). She also played the title role in the Broadway play Violet (1944).

After graduating from Marymount High School in Los Angeles in 1947, she attended the Royal Academy of Dramatic Art in London and also appeared on the London stage.

== Career ==
In early 1949, her parents arrived in London to make Stage Fright, Hitchcock's first British-made feature film since immigrating to Hollywood. Pat did not know she would have a walk-on part in the film until her parents arrived. Because she bore a resemblance to the star, Jane Wyman, her father asked if she would mind also doubling for Wyman in the scenes that required "danger driving".

She had supporting roles in three of her father's films. In Stage Fright (1950), she played a jolly acting student named Chubby Bannister, one of Wyman's school chums; Strangers on a Train (1951), playing Barbara Morton, sister of Anne Morton (Ruth Roman), the lover of Guy Haines (Farley Granger); and Caroline in Psycho (1960). In this role, she offers to share her tranquilizers with Marion Crane (Janet Leigh), having received them from her mother prior to her wedding night. Hitchcock was an extra in her father's film Sabotage (1936). She and her mother, Alma Reville, are in the crowd waiting for, then watching, the Lord Mayor's Show parade.

Hitchcock also worked for Jean Negulesco on The Mudlark (1950), which starred Irene Dunne and Alec Guinness, playing a palace maid, and again was cast as a maid in the first episode of the 1953 television series Life with Father. She had a bit-part in DeMille's The Ten Commandments (1956).

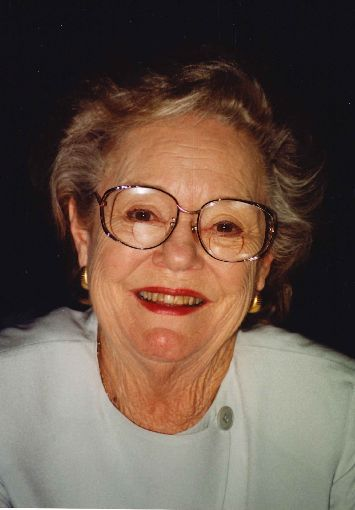
Hitchcock in 1996

As well as appearing in ten episodes of her father's half-hour television programme, Alfred Hitchcock Presents, Hitchcock worked on a few others, including Playhouse 90, which was live, directed by John Frankenheimer. Acting for her father, however, remained the high point of her acting career, which she interrupted to bring up her children. (Hitchcock has a small joke with her first appearance on his show – after saying good night and exiting the screen, he sticks his head back into the picture and remarks: "I thought the little leading lady was rather good, didn't you?")

She also served as executive producer of the documentary The Man on Lincoln's Nose (2000), which is about Robert F. Boyle and his contribution to films.

She edited one volume of Random House's series of short-fiction anthologies attributed to her father, Alfred Hitchcock Presents: My Favorites in Suspense (1959) and is acknowledged, under her married name, much in the way Robert Arthur Jr. or Harold Q. Masur were acknowledged as the "open secret" editors in other Random House volumes in the series (and in the subsequent Dell Books paperback reprints). For several years, she was the family representative on the staff of Alfred Hitchcock's Mystery Magazine. She supplied family photos and wrote the foreword of the book Footsteps in the Fog: Alfred Hitchcock's San Francisco (2002) by Jeff Kraft and Aaron Leventhal. A biography of her mother, Alma Hitchcock: The Woman Behind the Man, was co-written with Laurent Bouzereau, and published in 2003.

== Personal life ==
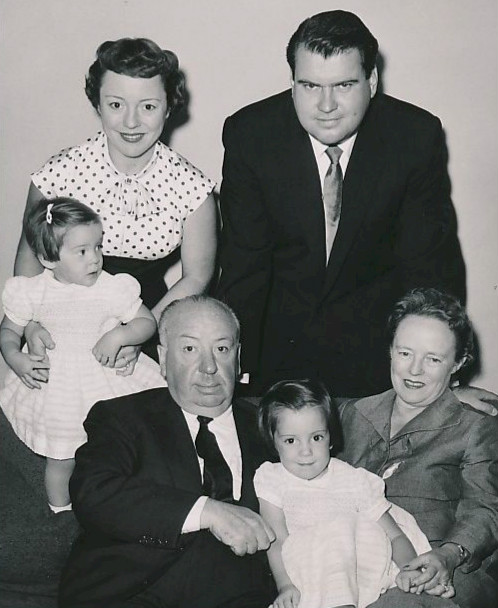
Back row, L–R: Patricia Hitchcock O'Connell holding daughter Terry O'Connell, husband Joseph O'Connell. Front row, L–R: Alfred Hitchcock, Mary Alma O'Connell, and Alma Reville Hitchcock

Hitchcock married Joseph E. O'Connell, Jr., son of Boston businessman Joseph E. O'Connell, on 17 January 1952, at Our Lady Chapel in St. Patrick's Cathedral, New York. The couple had three daughters, Mary Alma Stone, Teresa "Terry" Carrubba, and Kathleen "Katie" Fiala. O'Connell died in 1994.

Hitchcock died of natural causes in her sleep at her home in Thousand Oaks, California, on 9 August 2021, one month after her 93rd birthday. Her daughter Teresa made the following statement: "She was always really good at protecting the legacy of my grandparents and making sure they were always remembered. ... It's sort of an end of an era now that they're all gone."

== Filmography ==
=== Film ===
| Year | Film | Role | Notes |
|---|---|---|---|
| 1936 | Sabotage | Extra | Uncredited |
| 1950 | Stage Fright | Casey Banister | |
| 1950 | The Mudlark | Servant (bit part) | Uncredited |
| 1951 | Strangers on a Train | Barbara Morton | |
| 1956 | The Ten Commandments | Court Lady | Uncredited |
| 1960 | Psycho | Caroline | Credited as Pat Hitchcock |
| 1978 | Skateboard | Mrs. Harris | Credited as Pat Hitchcock |

=== Television ===
| Year | TV series | Role | Notes |
|---|---|---|---|
| 1949 | The Case of Thomas Pyke | Lady | TV movie, Patricia Hitchcock's debut |
| 1952 | Suspense | Esther Stone | Episode: "A Time of Innocence" (2 December 1952) Credited as Pat Hitchcock |
| 1953 | Life with Father | Nora | Premiere episode (22 November 1953) Credited as Pat Hitchcock |
| 1954 | My Little Margie | Woman in car | Episode: "The New Freddie" (31 March 1954) Credited as Pat Hitchcock |
| 1955 | Alfred Hitchcock Presents | Various | 10 episodes |
| 1975 | Ladies of the Corridor | Irma | TV movie |
| 1976 | Six Characters in Search of an Author | The Character Lady | TV movie, Credited as Pat Hitchcock |
