= The Blind Princess and the Poet =

1911 film directed by D. W. Griffith

- Directed by: D. W. Griffith
- Written by: Harriet Quimby
- Starring: Blanche Sweet
- Cinematography: G. W. Bitzer
- Distributed by: Biograph Company
- Release date: August 17, 1911
- Running time: 18 minutes
- Country: United States
- Language: Silent (English intertitles)

The Blind Princess and the Poet is a 1911 American short silent drama film directed by D. W. Griffith and starring Blanche Sweet.

== Cast ==
- Blanche Sweet as The Princess
- Charles West as The Poet
- Charles Gorman
- Francis J. Grandon
- Guy Hedlund
- Grace Henderson
- Florence La Badie
- Jeanie MacPherson
- W. Chrystie Miller
- Alfred Paget
- Gladys Egan as Equality

== See also ==
- List of American films of 1911
- D. W. Griffith filmography
- Blanche Sweet filmography
