= Ramona (1910 film) =

1910 film directed by D. W. Griffith

- Directed by: D. W. Griffith
- Written by: D. W. Griffith; Stanner E. V. Taylor
- Based on: Ramona; 1884 novel by Helen Hunt Jackson
- Produced by: D. W. Griffith
- Starring: Mary Pickford; Henry B. Walthall
- Cinematography: G. W. Bitzer
- Distributed by: Biograph Company
- Release date: May 23, 1910
- Running time: 17 minutes
- Country: United States
- Language: Silent (English intertitles)

Ramona (1910)

Ramona is a 1910 American silent drama film directed by D. W. Griffith, based on Helen Hunt Jackson's 1884 novel Ramona. Through a love story, the early short explores racial injustice against Native Americans and stars Mary Pickford and Henry B. Walthall. A print survives in the Library of Congress film archive. The film was remade in 1928 (dir. Edwin Carewe) with Dolores del Río and in 1936 (dir. Henry King) with Loretta Young.

== Plot ==
Ramona follows the romance between Ramona (Mary Pickford), a Spanish orphan raised by the wealthy Moreno family, and Alessandro (Henry B. Walthall), a Native American who arrives at the family's ranch. Felipe (Francis J. Grandon), Ramona's foster brother, confesses his love for her, but she rejects him in favor of Alessandro. Their desire to marry is opposed by Ramona's foster mother, who expels Alessandro from the estate.

Alessandro returns to his village, only to find it destroyed by white settlers. Ramona, upon learning she is of partial Native American descent, chooses to leave her family and live with Alessandro. They marry and settle among the ruins of his village, where they have a child. Their peace is disrupted when settlers claim the land, resulting in the death of their baby and Alessandro's mental decline. Alessandro is killed by a white man, and Ramona returns to the ranch with Felipe.

== Cast ==
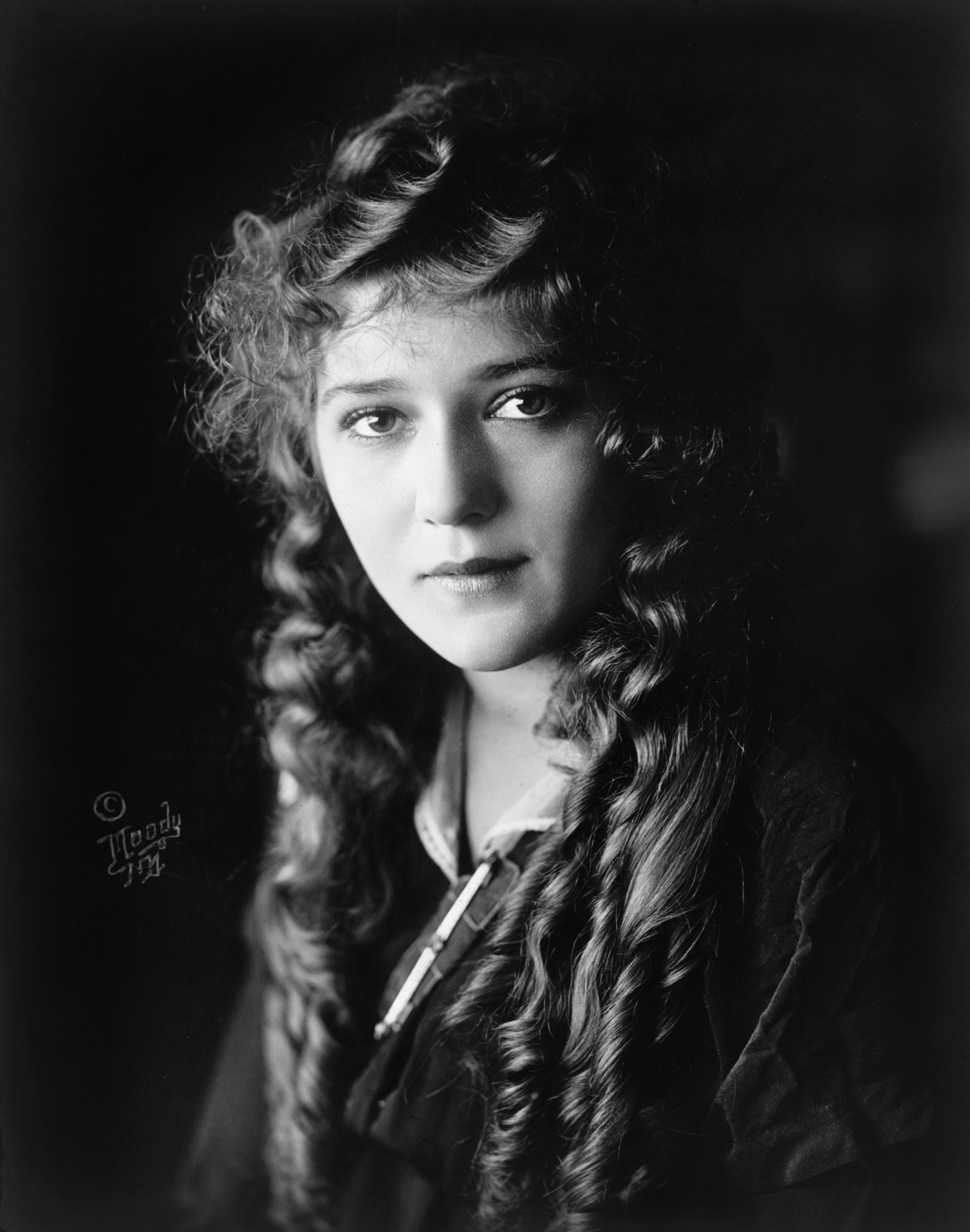
Mary Pickford, who plays Ramona

- Mary Pickford as Ramona
- Henry B. Walthall as Alessandro
- Francis J. Grandon as Felipe
- Kate Bruce as The Mother
- W. Chrystie Miller as The Priest
- Dorothy Bernard
- Gertrude Claire as Woman in West
- Robert Harron
- Dell Henderson as Man at Burial
- Mae Marsh
- Frank Opperman as Ranch Hand
- Anthony O'Sullivan as Ranch Hand
- Jack Pickford as A Boy
- Mack Sennett as White Exploiter

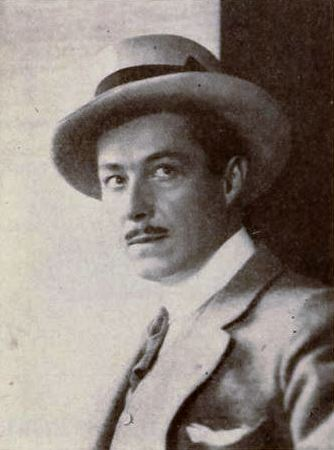
Henry B. Walthall, who plays Alessandro

== Production ==
Advertisements for the film stated that it was made "by arrangement with Little, Brown, & Company," the publishers of Jackson's novel. The film was shot on location in Ventura County, California, "at identical locations wherein Mrs. Jackson placed her characters."

At the time D. W. Griffith directed Ramona, the Biograph production company was experiencing financial difficulties. Still based in New York and competing with the now-fragmented Edison Company, Biograph was in search of new creative direction. Griffith joined the company in 1908 as a writer and actor. Soon after, the company's head director, Wallace McCutcheon, became ill, and his son was unable to maintain the role. As a result, Griffith became the principal director, overseeing all Biograph productions between June 1908 and December 1909. During this period, Griffith produced a significant volume of work, averaging one 12-minute and one 16-minute film per week. Biograph began its expansion westward largely due to Griffith's interest in filming Ramona on location in Ventura, California.

Griffith's frequent collaborator Billy Bitzer served as cinematographer. Bitzer had originally been hired as an electrician at Biograph, but his interest in photography led him to become a pioneering figure in early cinema. He was known for experimenting with lighting and close-up techniques. Bitzer and Griffith began working together shortly after The Adventures of Dollie, Griffith's first film, and continued their collaboration until both left Biograph in 1913. Bitzer's innovations are evident in Ramona through the film's landscape cinematography and early use of techniques such as cross-cutting.

== See also ==
- List of American films of 1910
