= Day Dreams (1919 film) =

Day Dreams (aka:DayDreams)
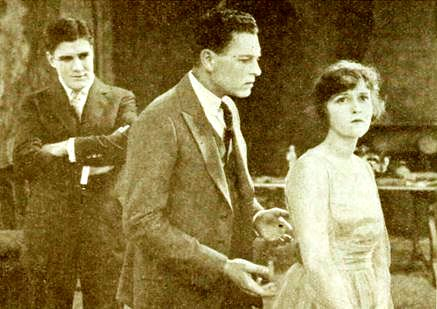
- Jere Austin, John Bowers, Madge Kennedy
- Directed by: Clarence Badger
- Written by: Cosmo Hamilton (story)
- Produced by: Samuel Goldwyn
- Starring: Madge Kennedy; John Bowers
- Cinematography: Marcel Le Picard
- Distributed by: Goldwyn Pictures
- Release date: January 12, 1919
- Running time: 50 minutes
- Country: United States
- Languages: Silent film (English intertitles)

Day Dreams is a lost 1919 silent film directed by Clarence Badger and starring Madge Kennedy and John Bowers. It was produced and distributed by Goldwyn Pictures.

== Cast ==
- Madge Kennedy as Primrose
- John Bowers as Dan O'Hara
- Jere Austin as George Graham
- Alec B. Francis as Grandfather Burn
- Grace Henderson as Grandmother Burn
- Marcia Harris as The Housekeeper
- Rumpletilzen as A Duck
