= To Be Called For =

- Directed by: Francis J. Grandon
- Written by: Wallace C. Clifton
- Starring: Adda Gleason; Lafe McKee; Earle Foxe
- Production company: Selig Polyscope Company
- Distributed by: Selig Polyscope Company
- Release date: September 1914
- Country: United States
- Language: Silent

To Be Called For is a 1914 American silent short comedy directed by Francis J. Grandon and written by Wallace C. Clifton. The film stars Earle Foxe and Adda Gleason in the main roles.

== Synopsis ==
Silas Brown, a close-fisted country hotel-keeper in Hicksville, has a pretty daughter, Betty, who has a devoted suitor in Otis Perkins, a typical country town boy. The curiosity of Betty is excited by a package marked for Francis King, "to be called for." For three weeks the package remains without a claimant. It accidentally falls to the floor and breaks open, showing a magnificent ball gown. Betty has been crying her pretty eyes out because her stingy father has refused her a party dress to wear at the church fair. She wears the unclaimed ball gown and makes a hit at the fair. Francis King, who is a traveling salesman, arrives the night of the fair, and admires Betty in her handsome gown, which he recognizes as one of his samples of a job lot. He sells the job lot to stingy old Silas at a low price because they are last year's samples. Betty confesses in tears, but King presents her with the sample dress, for which he has no further use. The jealousy of Otis is appeased while the salesman goes on to his next town.

== Cast ==
- Adda Gleason - Betty Brown
- Lafe McKee - Silas Brown
- Earle Foxe - Otis Perkins
- Charles Wheelock - Francis King
