= The Lonedale Operator =

1911 film directed by D. W. Griffith

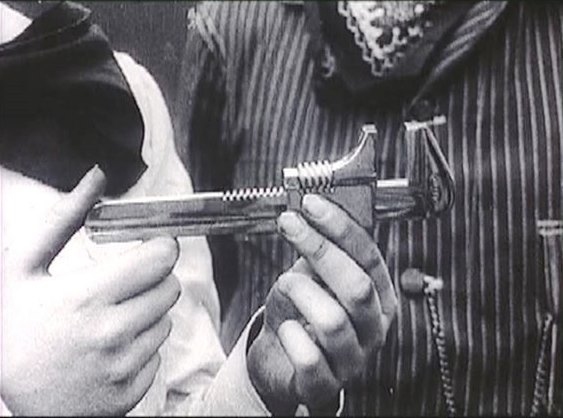
- Close-up of a wrench from the film's climax
- Directed by: D. W. Griffith
- Written by: Mack Sennett
- Produced by: D. W. Griffith
- Starring: Blanche Sweet; Verner Clarges
- Cinematography: G. W. Bitzer
- Distributed by: Biograph Company
- Release date: March 23, 1911
- Running time: 17 minutes (16 frame/s)
- Country: United States
- Language: Silent (English intertitles)

The Lonedale Operator is a 1911 American silent short drama film directed by D. W. Griffith, starring Blanche Sweet and written by Mack Sennett for the Biograph Company.

== Plot ==
PLAY full film; runtime 00:16:45

The plot of the film involves a girl who takes over a telegraph station after her father takes ill. After the payroll for the town's mine is delivered, two drifters try to steal the money. Their robbery is foiled because the girl is able to telegraph for help and then hold the would-be robbers off until help arrives.

== Production ==
Unlike most films at the time which had a simple plot line set in one location, The Lonedale Operator "intercuts three primary spaces—the telegraph office interior, the criminals outside, and the rescue train." Although audiences in 1911 were not used to such editing, as there were more than 100 shots in the film, the use of the telegraph helped them understand the crosscutting between scenes in such a way that they could follow the plot. The film is also significant for Griffith's use of a close-up of a wrench, which the girl had pretended was a gun. At the time of the film's release, close-ups were still uncommon. The Lonedale Operator illustrates Griffith's growing mastery of the medium.

== Cast ==
- Verner Clarges as In Payroll Office
- Guy Hedlund as On Train
- Jeanie MacPherson as In Payroll Office
- W. C. Robinson as In Payroll Office
- Edward Dillon as Telegrapher (uncredited)
- Francis J. Grandon as The Engineer (uncredited)
- Joseph Graybill as A Tramp (uncredited)
- Dell Henderson as A Tramp (uncredited)
- Wilfred Lucas as The Fireman (uncredited)
- W. Chrystie Miller as In Station Lobby (uncredited)
- George Nichols as The Lonedale Operator (uncredited)
- Blanche Sweet as Daughter of the Lonedale Operator (uncredited)
- Charles West as Company Agent (uncredited)

== Reception ==
The Lonedale Operator includes "elements of romance, drama, suspense, Western, and even a bit of comedy near the end."

== Preservation ==
The 35mm camera negative of the film survives in the hands of the Museum of Modern Art in New York City, and a print is held by Library and Archives Canada.

== See also ==
- D. W. Griffith filmography
- Blanche Sweet filmography
- Treasures from American Film Archives
