= Dorothy Bernard =

American actress (1890–1955)

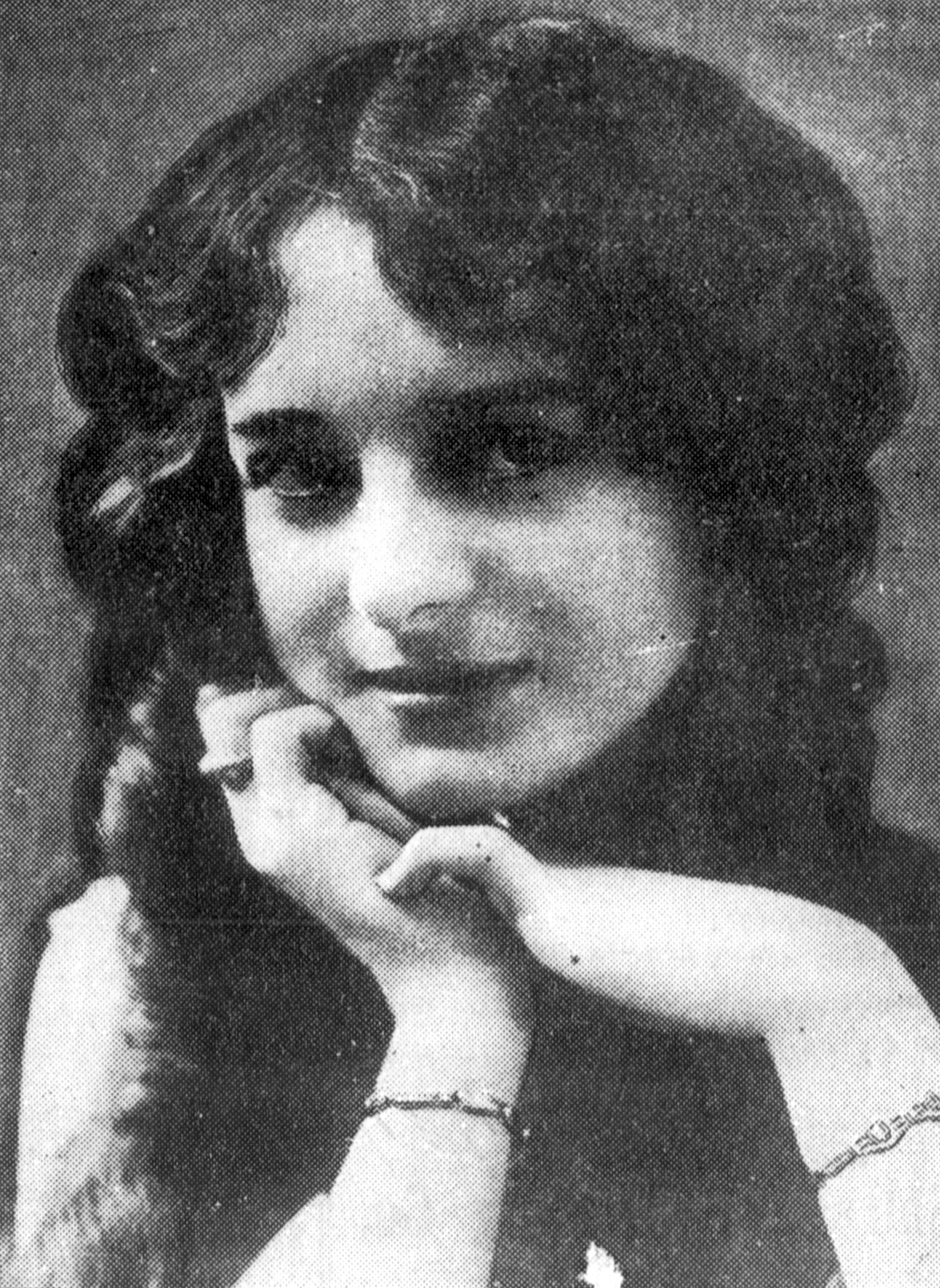
- Bernard, c. 1915
- Born: Nora Dorothy Bernard; June 25, 1890; Port Elizabeth, British Cape Colony
- Died: December 15, 1955 (aged 65); Hollywood, California, U.S.
- Occupation: Actress
- Years active: 1908-1956
- Spouse: A.H. Van Buren (1909-)

Nora Dorothy Bernard (June 25, 1890 – December 15, 1955) was an American actress of the silent era. She appeared in nearly 90 films between 1908 and 1956.

== Early years ==
She was born Nora Dorothy Bernard in Port Elizabeth, British Cape Colony, now part of South Africa, to William H Bernard and Roy Elizabeth Ayrd. Her father was from Auckland, New Zealand, and her mother was born in Sligo, Ireland. (Bernard said that her father "was English and partly Jewish" and her mother was Scotch-Irish.) They were there as part of a visiting stock theater company. Her grandfather was Joseph Bernard Simmons, drama critic for The Times of London.

Although her birth date is listed as July 25, 1890 in many biographies, her death certificate and U.S. passport both state her birth date as June 25, 1890. An only child, she spent her formative years in Portland, Oregon where her father worked as a stock company manager and was a well-respected actor. She said, "I spent some of my early childhood in Australia and New Zealand and was educated in San Francisco and Los Angeles." She graduated from the Marlborough School in Los Angeles.

== Career ==
As a child actress, Bernard appeared in several plays in Portland under "Dot Bernard" in the Baker Theater Company. Her stepmother, actress Nan Ramsey, also appeared in several productions. In 1905, her family moved to Los Angeles, California, and her father accepted a position to manage the Belasco Theater.

Bernard worked with stock theater companies in San Francisco, Los Angeles, Portland, and Detroit. She also performed in vaudeville. She first worked in films in 1911 with D. W. Griffith and the Biograph Company. On television, she portrayed Margaret, an Irish cook and housekeeper, in Life With Father after originating the role on stage.

Broadway shows in which Bernard appeared included Personality (1921), The Ragged Edge (1935), Love in My Fashion (1937), Life With Father (1939), and Life With Mother (1948).

== Personal life and death ==
She was married to actor A.H. Van Buren on July 5, 1909, in Washington D.C., and they had a daughter named Marjorie "Midge" Van Buren born in Jamaica, New York.

Bernard died of a heart attack at her Hollywood home on December 15, 1955, aged 65. Her body was cremated, and her ashes were stored at Chapel of the Pines Crematory in Los Angeles.

== Selected filmography ==
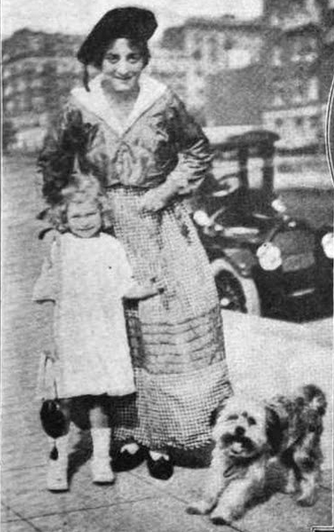
Bernard and daughter Marjorie depicted in The Green Book Magazine, 1916

- A Woman's Way (1908)
- An Awful Moment (1908)
- The Cord of Life (1909)
- The Girls and Daddy (1909)
- The Woman from Mellon's (1910)
- A Flash of Light (1910)
- Ramona (1910)
- The Two Paths (1911)
- His Trust Fulfilled (1911)
- His Trust (1911)
- For His Son (1912)
- The Root of Evil (1912)
- A Sister's Love (1912)
- A String of Pearls (1912)
- The Girl and Her Trust (1912)
- The Goddess of Sagebrush Gulch (1912)
- One Is Business, the Other Crime (1912)
- An Outcast Among Outcasts (1912)
- The House of Darkness (1913)
- The Sheriff's Baby (1913)
- Near to Earth (1913)
- A Chance Deception (1913)
- The Little Tease (1913)
- The Song of Hate (1915)
- The Little Gypsy (1915)
- A Soldier's Oath (1915)
- A Man of Sorrow (1916)
- The Bondman (1916)
- The Final Payment (1917)
- The Rainbow (1917)
- The Accomplice (1917)
- Little Women (1918)
- The Great Shadow (1920)
