= Grace Henderson =

American actress (1860–1944)

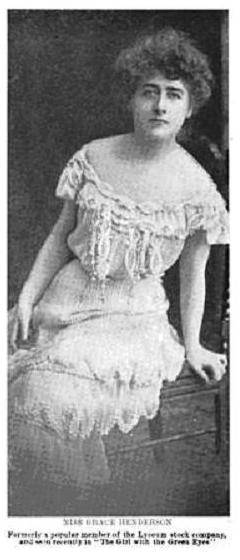
- Henderson in Theatre Magazine, 1904
- Born: Grace C. F. Roth; January 1860; Ann Arbor, Michigan, U.S.
- Died: October 30, 1944 (age 84); Bronx, New York City, U.S.
- Occupation: Actress
- Spouse: David Henderson (m. 1881; div. 1896)

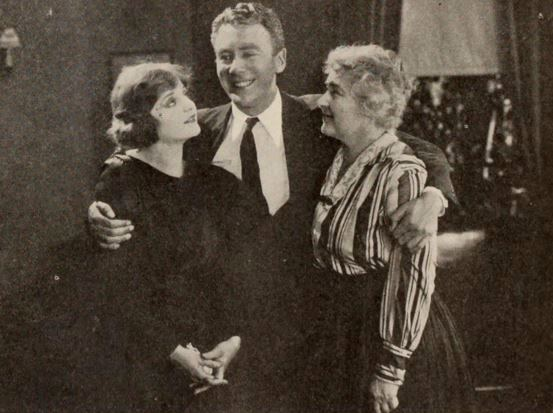
left to right: Tallulah Bankhead, Tom Moore and Grace Henderson in Thirty a Week(1918).

Grace C. F. Roth Henderson (January 1860 – October 30, 1944) was an American stage actress and prolific performer in silent motion pictures.

== Biography ==
Henderson was born Grace C. F. Roth in Ann Arbor, Michigan in January 1860. Her father, William (Wilhelm) F. was a justice of the peace born in Stuttgart in 1823, who died on April 19, 1871, in Ann Arbor.

She made her professional debut at McVicker's Theatre in Chicago in 1877. A decade later, she began a successful run at the Lyceum Theatre in New York City. She originated the role of "Lucille Ferrand" in The Wife. In 1896, she starred in Under the Polar Star, an elaborate play complete with a facsimile of a large sailing ship and real on-stage sled dogs. Under Southern Skies followed in 1901. She played in The Marquis, and received acclaim for her performance as "Phyliss Lee" in The Charity Ball. Later, Grace Henderson supported Nance O'Neill in Peter Pan, with Maude Adams' company. This production was staged at the Empire Theatre.

In 1903, during rehearsals for the Broadway production of My Wife's Husband, Henderson refused to act with a black player, Moses Fairfax, who had a significant part. Interviewed by a reporter, she explained in embarrassment that she had been raised in the South, where blacks and whites did not socialize to the point of a black calling a white woman by her first name.

She toured in Lightnin. The actress's final stage appearance came in the Theatre Guild production of Green Grow the Lilacs.

Henderson participated in more than 120 silent films, starting in 1909 with Lucky Jim. She was in His Trust (1911), which was directed by D. W. Griffith, and Trying To Fool Uncle (1912), a production of Mack Sennett. Her last film was Day Dreams, directed by Clarence G. Badger, in which she played "Grandmother Burn".

== Personal life ==
On December 20, 1881, she married David Henderson, a Chicago newspaperman and theatre manager, who managed the Chicago Opera House. In November 1896, David Henderson obtained a divorce decree from her, charging her with infidelity. George Alexander Ballantine of New York was named as a co-respondent. Henderson alleged that Grace visited Paris with Ballantine. On the trip, Ballantine created a sensation by applying for a divorce in the French courts from his wife. Henderson did not request custody of their son.

Grace was Henderson's second wife; he married a third time the same month his divorce from Grace was granted. David Henderson's third wife was Frankie Raymond, formerly a burlesque performer for the Henderson Burlesque Company. During this time, Grace was appearing in New York in Under the Polar Star.

George Ballantine, Grace's Parisian companion, wed Minnie Howe Parry on August 28, 1896, at the Waldorf. The announcement of their engagement caused a rift between Grace and Ballantine, in which a revolver played a significant part.

Grace allegedly had an affair with actor Maurice Barrymore in the late 1880s and bore a son who was mentally unstable or deficient. The son was confined to institutions and was virtually unknown to outside sources until Grace started appearing in early movies and devoting a lot of her salary to his upkeep.

Grace Henderson died in 1944 in Morrisania Hospital, Bronx, New York, aged 84. She was survived by her son, Edwin L. Henderson, of Schenectady, New York.

== Partial filmography ==
- Lucky Jim (1909)
- A Corner in Wheat (1909)
- A Flash of Light (1910)
- The House with Closed Shutters (1910)
- Love in Quarantine (1910)
- His Trust (1911)
- His Trust Fulfilled (1911)
- Fate's Turning (1911)
- Priscilla and the Umbrella (1911)
- The Broken Cross (1911)
- The Country Lovers (1911)
- The New Dress (1911)
- Enoch Arden (1911)
- The Primal Call (1911)
- The Blind Princess and the Poet (1911)
- The Adventures of Billy (1911)
- The Long Road (1911)
- Through Darkened Vales (1911)
- The School Teacher and the Waif (1912)
- For His Son (1912)
- The Transformation of Mike (1912)
- A String of Pearls (1912)
- Just Like a Woman (1912)
- Won by a Fish (1912)
- A Dash Through the Clouds (1912)
- The Sands of Dee (1912)
- The Narrow Road (1912)
- An Unseen Enemy (1912)
- Black and White (1913)
- In the Bishop's Carriage (1913)
- A Royal Romance (1917)
- War and the Woman (1917)
- When Love Was Blind (1917)
- Thirty a Week (1918)
- Day Dreams (1919)

== Sources ==
- The New York Times, "Mrs. David Henderson", October 31, 1944, Page 19.
- The New York Times, "David Henderson Marries Again", November 24, 1896, Page 5.
- The New York Times, "G.A. Ballantine's Debts", December 14, 1900, Page 3.
- Kotsilibas-Davis, James (1977). Great Times, Good Times: The Odyssey of Maurice Barrymore. Doubleday. ISBN 978-0-385-04953-5.
