= W. Chrystie Miller =

American actor

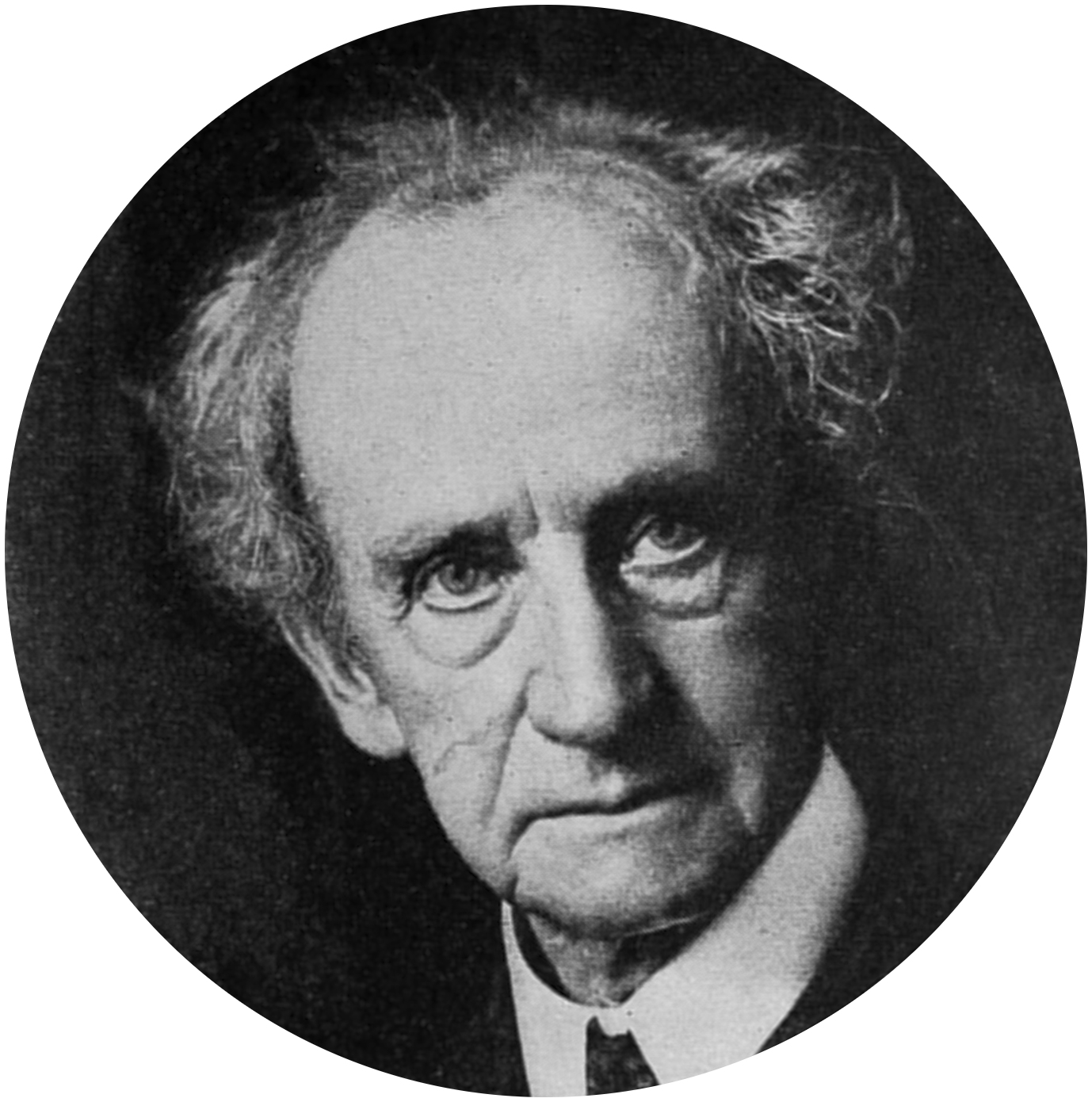
- Miller, c. 1915
- Born: William Chrystie Miller; August 10, 1843; Dayton, Ohio
- Died: September 23, 1922 (aged 79); Staten Island, New York
- Occupation: Actor
- Years active: 1908-1914

William Chrystie Miller (August 10, 1843 – September 23, 1922) was an American silent film actor. He appeared in 139 films between 1908 and 1914. Miller frequently appeared in films directed by D.W. Griffith and was known to film audiences as the "Grand Old Man of the Photodrama".

On Broadway, Miller played Heinrich in The Devil (1908). He was born in Dayton, Ohio and died in Staten Island, New York.

== Selected filmography ==
- The Zulu's Heart (1908)
- The Red Man's View (1909)
- A Corner in Wheat (1909)
- A Trap for Santa (1909)
- In Little Italy (1909)
- To Save Her Soul (1909)
- The Day After (1909)
- The Modern Prodigal (1910)
- The Rocky Road (1910)
- The Two Brothers (1910)
- Ramona (1910)
- In the Border States (1910)
- May and December (1910)
- The Lucky Toothache (1910)
- His Trust (1911)
- What Shall We Do with Our Old? (1911)
- Fisher Folks (1911)
- The Lily of the Tenements (1911)
- Was He a Coward? (1911)
- The Lonedale Operator (1911)
- The New Dress (1911)
- The White Rose of the Wilds (1911)
- The Smile of a Child (1911)
- The Last Drop of Water (1911)
- The Blind Princess and the Poet (1911)
- The Battle (1911)
- The Old Bookkeeper (1912)
- Under Burning Skies (1912)
- The Goddess of Sagebrush Gulch (1912)
- An Outcast Among Outcasts (1912)
- A Temporary Truce (1912)
- The Spirit Awakened (1912)
- The Sands of Dee (1912)
- A Change of Spirit (1912)
- Blind Love (1912)
- Two Daughters of Eve (1912)
- The Chief's Blanket (1912)
- My Baby (1912)
- The Informer (1912)
- A Sailor's Heart (1912)
- The Little Tease (1913)
- The Tender Hearted Boy (1913)
- Pirate Gold (1913)
- An Adventure in the Autumn Woods (1913)
- A Misappropriated Turkey (1913)
- Oil and Water (1913)
- A Girl's Stratagem (1913)
- A Welcome Intruder (1913)
- The Unwelcome Guest (1913)
- Just Gold (1913)
- A Timely Interception (1913)
- The Stopped Clock (1913)
- The Battle at Elderbush Gulch (1913)
- Judith of Bethulia (1914)
