= Guy Hedlund =

American actor (1884–1964)

- Born: Guy Elmer Hedlund; August 21, 1884; Portland, Connecticut, U.S.
- Died: December 29, 1964 (aged 80); Culver City, California, U.S.
- Occupation: Actor
- Years active: 1906-1947

Guy Elmer Hedlund (August 21, 1884 – December 29, 1964) was an American actor of the silent era. He appeared in more than 120 films between 1906 and 1947.

Born in Portland, Connecticut, on August 21, 1884, worked with newspapers, on a cattle boat, and as a lumberjack before he began acting. His father was the captain of a yacht.

Hedlund began entertaining in England, and he went on to perform in Ireland and Scotland. He returned to the United States, initially acting on stage before he went into films. Hedlund directed the 1920 industrial film The Making of an American.

Beginning in 1931, Hedlund spent a decade at WTIC radio in Hartford, Connecticut, managing The Guy Hedlund Players.

Hedlund was married to actress Edith Randle. He died in Culver City in a road accident.

== Selected filmography ==
Year	Film	Role	Notes
1908	Romance of a Jewess		
1908	The Taming of the Shrew		
1909	In Little Italy	At the Ball	Unconfirmed
1910	The Woman from Mellon's	Butler	
1910	In the Border States	Confederate Soldier	
1910	A Flash of Light	At First Party/At Second Party	
1910	The Modern Prodigal	The Prodigal Son	
1910	A Mohawk's Way	Indian	
1911	His Trust	Black servant	
1911	His Trust Fulfilled	Freed slave/Man in wedding group	
1911	Was He a Coward?	An Indian	
1911	The Lonedale Operator	On Train	
1911	What Shall We Do with Our Old?	Young Carpenter in Shop/In Court	
1911	Enoch Arden	On Rescue Ship	
1911	The Indian Brothers	The Renegade	
1911	The Blind Princess and the Poet		
1911	The Battle	A Union Soldier	
1912	For the Cause of the South	Colonel Randall's Son	
1912	The Eternal Mother	A Friend	
