= Francis J. Grandon =

American actor

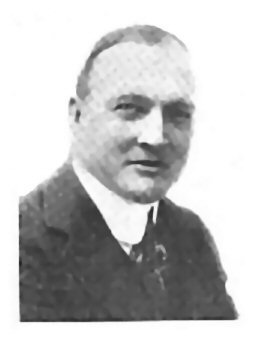
- The Moving Picture World, 1916
- Born: 1879; Chicago, Illinois; United States
- Died: July 11, 1929 (aged 49–50); Los Angeles, California; United States
- Occupations: Actor, director
- Years active: 1895–1925
- Spouse: Helen S. Grandon

Francis J. Grandon (1879 – July 11, 1929) was an American silent film actor and director who acted in almost 100 films and directed over 100. Frank Grandon's obituary, printed in newspapers from coast-to- coast, called him "the father of movie serial motion pictures" and a mentor to many young film stars.

== Early career ==
He was born in Chicago, Illinois. Little here is known about the early life of Francis Grandon other than he was listed as a members of Jessie May Hall’s company during an 1895 engagement at the Opera House in Portsmouth, Ohio and that he first arrived in Los Angeles in 1902, most likely as a member of a traveling repertory troupe.

== Career profile in The Moving Picture World, 1916 ==
In is January 22, 1916 issue, the trade journal The Moving Picture World announces Grandon's move to Metro Pictures, which was founded just a year earlier. The publication, as part of that announcement, also provides the following profile on his career up to that date:

Francis J. Grandon, one of the foremost directors in the country and a veteran in this branch of motion picture production, is the latest addition to the large staff of Metro producers. Mr. Grandon has just completed, in record time, his first Metro wonderplay, "The Lure of Heart's Desire," in which Edmund Breese, the eminent dramatic actor, is starred. It was produced for Metro by the Popular Plays and Players. Mr. Grandon's next feature will be "The Soul Market," by Aaron Hoffman, in which Mme. Petrova will be seen in the stellar role.

Before joining Metro Mr. Grandon was a director with the Triangle Company. He began his career with D. W. Griffith, at the old Biograph company, and was associated with Mr. Griffith for several years. Mr. Grandon then received an attractive offer from Lubin, and went with that company as their first director. Later Mr. Grandon joined the Selig's forces, and while with that concern directed and produced the first serial released in connection with syndicated newspaper stories. This was "The Adventures of Kathlyn," with Kathlyn Williams, the star.

Virtus Scott, until recently on the directing staff of the Famous Players, is another addition to the Metro and the Popular Plays and Players, being Mr. Grandon's assistant Mr. Scott's last work with the Famous Players was with Mary Pickford in "The Foundling," and Pauline Frederick in "Bella Donna." Before that Mr. Scott was with the Equitable, and assisted in the direction of "Sealed Lips," in which Mr. Scott achieved individual distinction for his masterly handling for a big church interior scene, photographed in a well known Brooklyn edifice.

Through a factory accident, which delayed the release of "The Rose of the Alley," with Mary Miles Minter, Mr. Grandon and Mr. Scott were obliged to hurry through their first Metro release, "The Lure of Heart's Desire," but they met the emergency in good shape with a finished and artistic feature.

== Personal life and death ==
Helen S. Grandon, his wife, was a native of Indiana and eighteen years his junior when she married him around 1920 at the age of twenty-two.

Francis J. Grandon died on July 11, 1929, in Los Angeles after suffering a series of strokes over several years. In 1925 Grandon had disappeared for a number of weeks before film director Webster Cullison traced him to a Portland, Oregon hospital ward where he was recovering from his initial stroke. At the time of his death Grandon had no immediate family other than his young wife who was not mentioned in his obituary. Francis J. Grandon's funeral services were held on Saturday, July 13, at the LeRoy Bagley Mortuary on Hollywood Boulevard.

== Selected filmography ==
- Barb Wire (1922)
- The Adventures of Kathlyn (1916)
- Playing with Fire (1916)
- The Soul Market (1916)
- The Lure of Heart's Desire (1916)
- Rosemary, That's for Remembrance (1914)
- The Livid Flame (1914)
- To Be Called For (1914)
- A Beast at Bay (1912)
- Mrs. Matthews, Dressmaker (1912)
- The Blind Princess and the Poet (1911)
- The Last Drop of Water (1911)
- The Indian Brothers (1911)
- Enoch Arden (1911)
- The Lonedale Operator (1911)
- Was He a Coward? (1911)
- The Lily of the Tenements (1911)
- What Shall We Do with Our Old? (1911)
- His Trust (1911)
- Ramona (1910)
- The House with Closed Shutters (1910)
- What the Daisy Said (1910)
- In the Border States (1910)
- The Modern Prodigal (1910) as At Post Office
- A Mohawk's Way (1910) as Indian medicine man
