= Blanche Sweet filmography =

Filmography of American actress Blanche Sweet

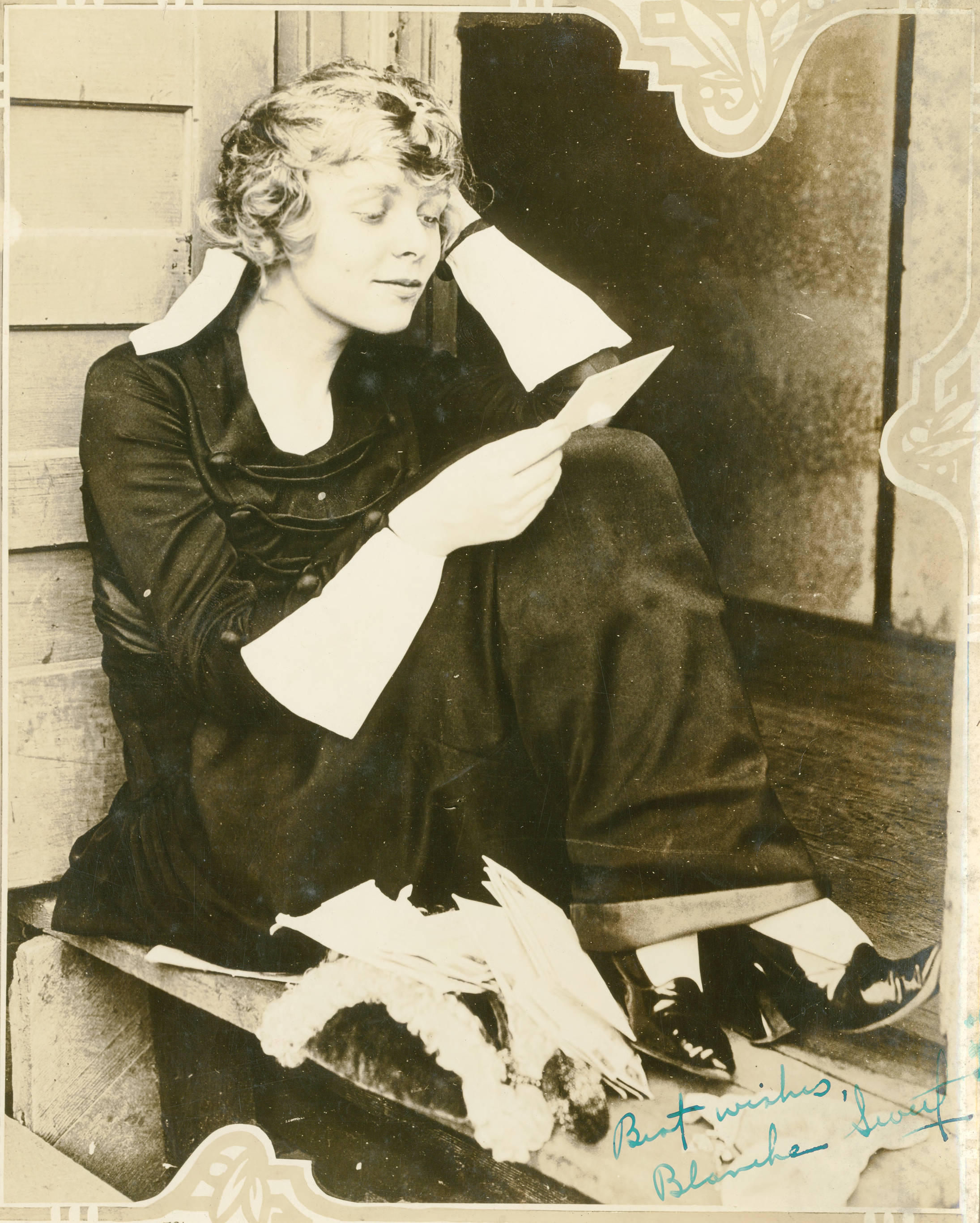
Blanche Sweet c. 1916

This is the filmography for Blanche Sweet. According to the Internet Movie Database, Sweet appeared in 161 films between 1909 and 1959.

Key
†	Denotes a lost or presumed lost film.

== Biograph (1909–1914) ==
Blanche Sweet started working at Biograph in 1909 under contract to director D. W. Griffith. Sweet remained at Biograph until 1914. Sweet starred in 85 films under Biograph, most of which were one or two reels.

=== 1909 ===
Release date	Title	Role	Director	Studio(s) / Distributor(s)	Notes
1909	A Man with Three Wives †				
December 13, 1909	A Corner in Wheat		D. W. Griffith	Biograph Company	
December 23, 1909	In Little Italy	At the Ball	D. W. Griffith	Biograph Company	
December 27, 1909	To Save Her Soul	Backstage at Debut/At Party	D. W. Griffith	Biograph Company	
December 30, 1909	The Day After	The New Year	D. W. Griffith; Frank Powell	Biograph Company	
December 30, 1909	Choosing a Husband †	One of Gladys' Friends	D. W. Griffith	Biograph Company	

=== 1910 ===
Release date	Title	Role	Director	Studio(s) / Distributor(s)	Notes
January 3, 1910	The Rocky Road	The Daughter, at Eighteen	D. W. Griffith	Biograph Company	
January 15, 1910	All on Account of the Milk	The Maid	Frank Powell	Biograph Company	
April 11, 1910	A Romance of the Western Hills		D. W. Griffith	Biograph Company	
April 14, 1910	The Kid †		Frank Powell	Biograph Company	
July 18, 1910	A Flash of Light		D. W. Griffith	Biograph Company	
November 17, 1910	Love in Quarantine †		Frank Powell	Biograph Company	

=== 1911 ===
Release date	Title	Role	Director	Studio(s) / Distributor(s)	Notes
January 2, 1911	The Two Paths		D. W. Griffith	Biograph Company	
February 6, 1911	Heart Beats of Long Ago		D. W. Griffith	Biograph Company	
February 23, 1911	His Daughter †		D. W. Griffith	Biograph Company	
February 27, 1911	The Lily of the Tenements †		D. W. Griffith	Biograph Company	
March 6, 1911	A Decree of Destiny		D. W. Griffith	Biograph Company	
March 16, 1911	Was He a Coward?		D. W. Griffith	Biograph Company	
March 23, 1911	The Lonedale Operator	Daughter of the Linedale Operator	D. W. Griffith	Biograph Company	Uncredited
March 27, 1911	Priscilla's April Fool Joke †	On Lawn	Frank Powell	Biograph Company	
March 30, 1911	The Spanish Gypsy †		D. W. Griffith	Biograph Company	
April 3, 1911	Priscilla and the Umbrella †	The Sister	Frank Powell; Mack Sennett	Biograph Company	
April 6, 1911	The Broken Cross †		D. W. Griffith	Biograph Company	
April 27, 1911	How She Triumphed †	Mary	D. W. Griffith	Biograph Company	
May 11, 1911	The Country Lovers †		Mack Sennett	Biograph Company	
May 15, 1911	The New Dress †	At Wedding/At Market	D. W. Griffith	Biograph Company	
May 25, 1911	The White Rose of the Wilds †	White Rose	D. W. Griffith	Biograph Company	
June 5, 1911	The Smile of a Child †	The Peasant Woman	D. W. Griffith	Biograph Company	
June 12, 1911; June 15, 1911	Enoch Arden	On the Beach	D. W. Griffith	Biograph Company	
June 22, 1911	The Primal Call †		D. W. Griffith	Biograph Company	
June 29, 1911	Fighting Blood		D. W. Griffith	Biograph Company	
July 17, 1911	The Indian Brothers	Indian	D. W. Griffith	Biograph Company	
July 24, 1911	A Country Cupid	Edith	D. W. Griffith	Biograph Company	
July 27, 1911	The Last Drop of Water	Mary	D. W. Griffith	Biograph Company	
August 3, 1911	Out from the Shadow †	Mrs. Vane	D. W. Griffith	Biograph Company	
August 17, 1911	The Blind Princess and the Poet †	The Princess	D. W. Griffith	Biograph Company	
September 4, 1911	The Stuff Heroes Are Made Of	Alice	D. W. Griffith	Biograph Company	
October 5, 1911	The Making of a Man †	Young Woman	D. W. Griffith	Biograph Company	
October 26, 1911	The Long Road †	Edith	D. W. Griffith	Biograph Company	
October 30, 1911	Love in the Hills †	The Girl	D. W. Griffith	Biograph Company	
November 6, 1911	The Battle	The Boy's Sweetheart	D. W. Griffith	Biograph Company	
November 16, 1911	Through Darkened Vales	Grace	D. W. Griffith	Biograph Company	
November 20, 1911	The Miser's Heart	Neighbor	D. W. Griffith	Biograph Company	
November 30, 1911	A Woman Scorned †		D. W. Griffith	Biograph Company	
December 28, 1911	The Voice of the Child †	The Wife	D. W. Griffith	Biograph Company	

=== 1912 ===
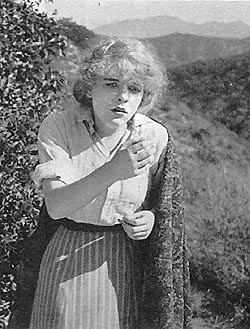
c. 1912

Release date	Title	Role	Director	Studio(s) / Distributor(s)	Notes
January 11, 1912	The Eternal Mother	Martha, the Wife	D. W. Griffith	Biograph Company	
January 18, 1912	The Old Bookkeeper †	The Old Bookkeeper's Employer's Wife	D. W. Griffith	Biograph Company	
January 22, 1912	For His Son	The Son's Fiancée	D. W. Griffith	Biograph Company	
February 1, 1912	The Transformation of Mike	The Tenement Girl	D. W. Griffith	Biograph Company	
February 8, 1912	A Sister's Love †		D. W. Griffith	Biograph Company	
February 22, 1912	Under Burning Skies	Emily	D. W. Griffith	Biograph Company	
March 7, 1912	A String of Pearls †	The Second Woman	D. W. Griffith	Biograph Company	
March 25, 1912	The Goddess of Sagebrush Gulch †	The Goddess	D. W. Griffith	Biograph Company	
April 4, 1912	The Punishment †	The Fruit Grower's Daughter	D. W. Griffith	Biograph Company	
April 25, 1912	One Is Business, the Other Crime	Rich Wife	D. W. Griffith	Biograph Company	
April 29, 1912	The Lesser Evil	The Young Woman	D. W. Griffith	Biograph Company	
May 30, 1912	An Outcast Among Outcasts †	The Young Woman	D. W. Griffith	Biograph Company	
June 10, 1912	A Temporary Truce	Alice, the Prospector's Wife	D. W. Griffith	Biograph Company	
June 20, 1912	The Spirit Awakened †	The Young Woman	D. W. Griffith	Biograph Company	
July 1, 1912	Man's Lust for Gold †	The Prospector's Daughter	D. W. Griffith	Biograph Company	
August 12, 1912	The Inner Circle		D. W. Griffith	Biograph Company	
August 19, 1912	With the Enemy's Help	The Prospector's Wife	Wilfred Lucas	Biograph Company	
August 22, 1912	A Change of Spirit †	The Young Woman	D. W. Griffith	Biograph Company	
1912	A Pueblo Romance †		D. W. Griffith	Biograph Company	
September 12, 1912	Blind Love †	The Young Woman	D. W. Griffith	Biograph Company	
October 10, 1912	The Chief's Blanket †	The Young Woman	D. W. Griffith	Biograph Company	
October 24, 1912	The Painted Lady	the Older Sister	D. W. Griffith	Biograph Company	
November 25, 1912	A Sailor's Heart	The Wife	Wilfred Lucas	Biograph Company	
December 26, 1912	The God Within	The Woman of the Camp	D. W. Griffith	Biograph Company; General Film Company	

=== 1913 ===
Release date	Title	Role	Director	Studio(s) / Distributor(s)	Notes
January 2, 1913	Three Friends †	The Wife	D. W. Griffith	Biograph Company	
January 13, 1913	Pirate Gold †	The Daughter	D. W. Griffith	Biograph Company	
February 6, 1913	Oil and Water	Mlle. Genova	D. W. Griffith	Biograph Company	
February 24, 1913	A Chance Deception †	The Wife	D. W. Griffith	Biograph Company	
February 27, 1913	Love in an Apartment Hotel †	The Young Woman	D. W. Griffith	Biograph Company	
March 8, 1913	Broken Ways	The Road Agent's Wife	D. W. Griffith	Biograph Company	
March 20, 1913	Near to Earth †		D. W. Griffith	Biograph Company	
April 3, 1913	The Hero of Little Italy †	Maria	D. W. Griffith	Biograph Company	
April 7, 1913	The Stolen Bride †	The Grower's Daughter	Anthony O'Sullivan	Biograph Company	
May 1, 1913	If We Only Knew †	The Mother	D. W. Griffith	Biograph Company	
June 14, 1913	Death's Marathon	The Wife	D. W. Griffith	Biograph Company	
July 12, 1913	The Mistake †	The Young Woman	D. W. Griffith	Biograph Company	
1913	The Coming of Angelo †		D. W. Griffith	Biograph Company	
July 28, 1913	The Vengeance of Galora †		Anthony O'Sullivan	Biograph Company	
August 23, 1913	Two Men of the Desert †	The Authoress	D. W. Griffith	Biograph Company	
November 17, 1913	A Cure for Suffragettes		Edward Dillon	Biograph Company	
November 1913	The Battle at Elderbush Gulch		D. W. Griffith	Biograph Company	
December 13, 1913	The House of Discord	The Wife	James Kirkwood Sr.	Biograph Company	
1913	Beyond All Law †		Frank Powell	Biograph Company	
1913	Her Wedding Bell †			Biograph Company	
1913	The Wedding Gown		Frank Powell	Biograph Company	

=== 1914 ===
Release date	Title	Role	Director	Studio(s) / Distributor(s)	Notes
1914	The Sentimental Sister †			Biograph Company	
February 14, 1914	Classmates	Sylvia Randolph	James Kirkwood	Biograph Company	
February 26, 1914	The Massacre	Stephen's Ward	D. W. Griffith	Biograph Company	
March 8, 1914	Judith of Bethulia	Judith	D. W. Griffith	Biograph Company	
March 19, 1914	Strongheart †	Dorothy Nelson, Frank's Sister	James Kirkwood	Biograph Company	
April 25, 1914	Brute Force		D. W. Griffith	Biograph Company	
March 18, 1915	His Desperate Deed †			Biograph Company	

== Mutual Film Corporation (1914) ==
Griffith left Biograph in 1914, wanting to continue directing feature films such as Judith of Bethulia. He took his actors with him and joined the Mutual Film Corporation. Most of Sweet's films under Mutual Film are now lost. Of the 14 films, only 3 are known to survive.

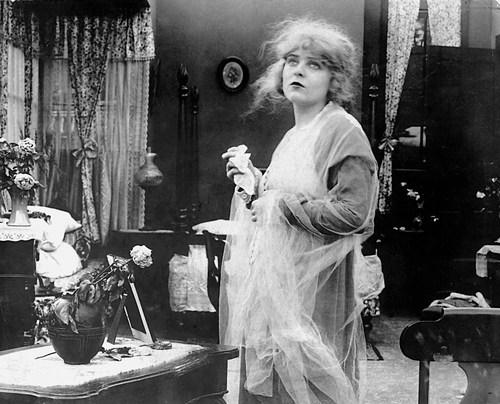
The Avenging Conscience scene.

=== 1914 ===
Release date	Title	Role	Director	Studio(s) / Distributor(s)	Notes
1914	Ashes of the Past †		James Kirkwood Sr.	Mutual Film	
May 17, 1914	Home, Sweet Home	The Wife	D. W. Griffith	Mutual Film	
1914	The Soul of Honor †		James Kirkwood Sr.	Mutual Film	
June 1, 1914	The Escape †	May Joyce	D. W. Griffith	Mutual Film	
August 2, 1914	The Avenging Conscience: or 'Thou Shalt Not Kill'	his sweetheart	D. W. Griffith	Mutual Film	
1914	The Second Mrs. Roebuck †	Mabel Mack	D. W. Griffith	Mutual Film	
August 1914	Men and Women †	Agnes Rodman	James Kirkwood	Biograph Company	
1914	For Those Unborn †		Christy Cabanne	Mutual Film	
1914	Her Awakening †	Mary	Christy Cabanne	Mutual Film	
1914	For Her Father's Sins †	Mary Ashton	John B. O'Brien	Mutual Film	
November 8, 1914	The Tear That Burned †		John B. O'Brien	Mutual Film	
1914	The Odalisque †	May, A Stock Girl	Christy Cabanne	Mutual Film	
1914	The Little Country Mouse	Dorothy	Donald Crisp	Mutual Film	
1914	The Old Maid †		John B. O'Brien	Mutual Film	

== Paramount Pictures (1915–1919) ==
Sweet and Griffith parted ways in 1915 and Sweet signed with Famous Players Film Company for a higher pay. The studio would become known as Famous Players–Lasky following a merger in 1916. Films would be distributed by Paramount Pictures. 8 of the 20 films Sweet starred in survive, while 12 are presumed lost.

=== 1915 ===
Release date	Title	Role	Director	Studio(s) / Distributor(s)	Notes
February 15, 1915	The Warrens of Virginia	Agatha Warren	Cecil B. DeMille	Paramount Pictures	
April 22, 1915	The Captive	Sonya Martinovich	Cecil B. DeMille	Paramount Pictures	
May 24, 1915	Stolen Goods †	Margery Huntley	George Melford	Paramount Pictures	
July 8, 1915	The Clue †	Christine Lesley	James Neill; Frank Reicher	Paramount Pictures	
August 9, 1915	The Secret Orchard †	Diane	Frank Reicher	Paramount Pictures	
September 13, 1915	The Case of Becky	Dorothy/Becky	Frank Reicher	Paramount Pictures	
October 21, 1915	The Secret Sin	Edith Martin/Grace Martin	Frank Reicher	Paramount Pictures	
January 23, 1916	The Ragamuffin	Jenny	William C. deMille	Paramount Pictures	
February 20, 1916	The Blacklist †	Vera Maroff	William C. deMille	Paramount Pictures	
March 30, 1916	The Sowers	Karin Dolokhof	William C. DeMille	Paramount Pictures	
May 28, 1916	The Thousand-Dollar Husband †	Olga Nelson	James Young	Paramount Pictures	
July 2, 1916	The Dupe †	Ethel Hale	Frank Reicher	Paramount Pictures	
August 20, 1916	Public Opinion	Hazel Gray	Frank Reicher	Paramount Pictures	
October 5, 1916	The Storm †	Natalie Raydon	Frank Reicher	Paramount Pictures	
November 6, 1916	Unprotected †	Barbara King	James Young	Paramount Pictures	
January 4, 1917	The Evil Eye	Dr. Katherine Torrance	George Melford	Paramount Pictures	
March 1, 1917	Those Without Sin †	Melanie Landry	Marshall Neilan	Paramount Pictures	
April 12, 1917	The Tides of Barnegat †	Jane Cobden	Marshall Neilan	Paramount Pictures	
May 10, 1917	The Silent Partner †	Jane Colby	Marshall Neilan	Paramount Pictures	
March 2, 1919	The Unpardonable Sin †	Alice Parcot/Dimny Parcot	Marshall Neilan	Paramount Pictures	

== Pathé Exchange ==
Sweet exclusively starred in films made by Pathé Exchange from 1919 to 1921. 6 of the 8 films are presumed lost.

Release date	Title	Role	Director	Studio(s) / Distributor(s)	Notes
November 19, 1919	A Woman of Pleasure †	Alice Dane	Wallace Worsley	Pathé Exchange	
January 11, 1920	Fighting Cressy †	Cressy	Robert Thornby	Pathé Exchange	
March 28, 1920	The Deadlier Sex	Mary Willard	Robert Thornby	Pathé Exchange	
May 12, 1920	Simple Souls †	Molly Shine	Robert Thornby	Pathé Exchange	
August 5, 1920	The Girl in the Web †	Esther Maitland	Robert Thornby	Pathé Exchange	
September 26, 1920	Help Wanted – Male †	Leona Stafford	Henry King	Pathé Exchange	
November 21, 1920	Her Unwilling Husband †	Mavis	Paul Scardon	Pathé Exchange	
January 1921	That Girl Montana	Montana Rivers	Robert Thornby	Pathé Exchange	

== Later films (1919–1929) ==
Of the 17 films, 6 survive and 11 are presumed lost.

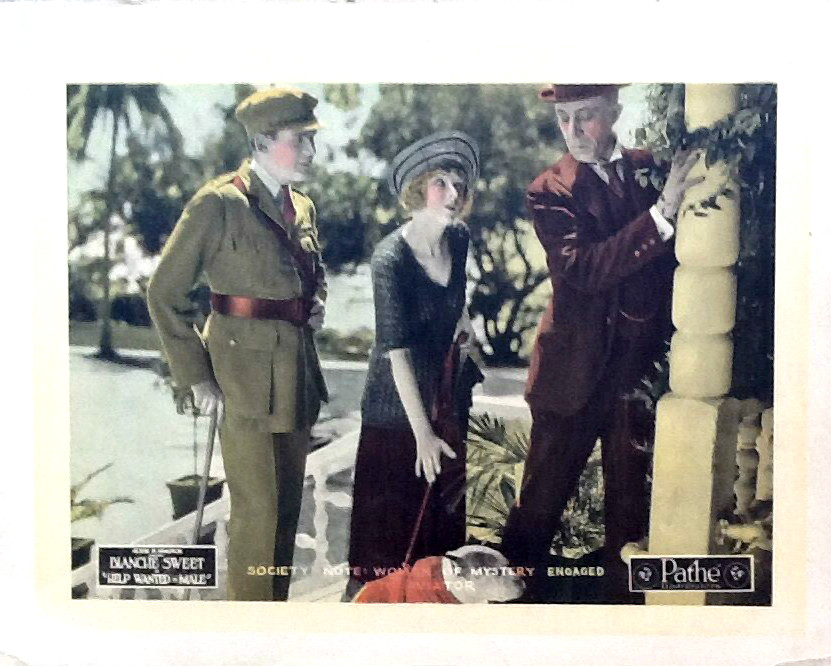
Help Wanted-Male lobby card

Blanche Sweet in Anna Christie 1923

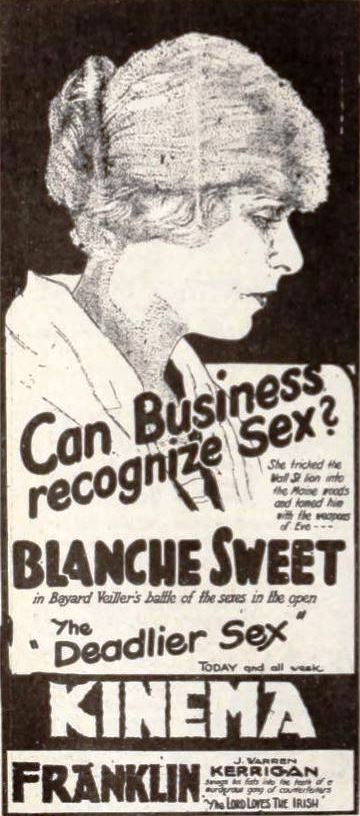
The Deadlier Sex - newspaper ad

Release date	Title	Role	Director	Studio(s) / Distributor(s)	Notes
1919	The Hushed Hour	Virginia Appleton Blodgett	Edmund Mortimer	Harry Garson Productions	
December 4, 1922	Quincy Adams Sawyer †	Alice Pettengill	Clarence G. Badger	Metro Pictures	
October 22, 1923	The Meanest Man in the World †	Jane Hudson	Edward F. Cline	Principal Pictures	
October 28, 1923	In the Palace of the King †	Delores Mendoza	Emmett J. Flynn	Goldwyn Pictures	
November 25, 1923	Anna Christie	Anna Christie	John Griffith Wray	First National Pictures	
April 28, 1924	Those Who Dance †	Rose Carney	Lambert Hillyer	First National Pictures	
August 11, 1924	Tess of the d'Urbervilles †	Teresa "Tess" Durbeyfield	Marshall Neilman	Metro-Goldwyn-Mayer	
April 13, 1925	The Sporting Venus	Lady Gwendolyn	Marshall Neilan	Metro-Goldwyn-Mayer	
May 3, 1925	His Supreme Moment †	Carla King	George Fitzmaurice	First National Pictures	
October 18, 1925	Why Women Love †	Molla Hansen	Edwin Carewe	First National Pictures	
November 1, 1925	The New Commandment †	Renee Darcourt	Howard Higgin	First National Pictures	
January 13, 1926	Bluebeard's Seven Wives †	Juliet	Alfred Santell	First National Pictures	
January 7, 1926	The Lady from Hell	Lady Margaret Darnely	Stuart Paton	Stuart Paton Productions	
February 14, 1926	The Far Cry †	Claire Marsh	Silvano Balboni	First National Pictures	
September 20, 1926	Diplomacy	Dora	Marshall Neilan	Paramount Pictures	
August 23, 1927	Singed	Dolly Wall	John Griffith Wray	Fox Film Corporation	
May 24, 1929	The Woman in White †	Laura Fairlie/Anne	Herbert Wilcox	British and Dominions Imperial Studios	

=== Sound Films (1929–1959) ===
Sweet starred only in five sound films, retiring in 1930. Her final role was uncredited in 1959. All are extant.

Release date	Title	Role	Director	Studio(s) / Distributor(s)	Notes
December 31, 1929	Always Faithful	Mrs. George W. Mason	Alfred A. Cohn	Warner Bros.	*short
January 24, 1930	The Woman Racket	Julia Barnes Hayes	Robert Ober; Albert H. Kelley	Metro-Goldwyn-Mayer	
April 20, 1930	Showgirl in Hollywood	Donny Harris (Mrs. Buelow)	Mervyn LeRoy	First National Pictures	Final reel was filmed in Technicolor but is now lost.
October 25, 1930	The Silver Horde	Queenie	George Archainbaud	RKO Pictures	
June 18, 1959	The Five Pennies	Headmistress of School	Melville Shavelson	Paramount Pictures	Uncredited
