= Joseph Graybill =

American actor (1887–1913)

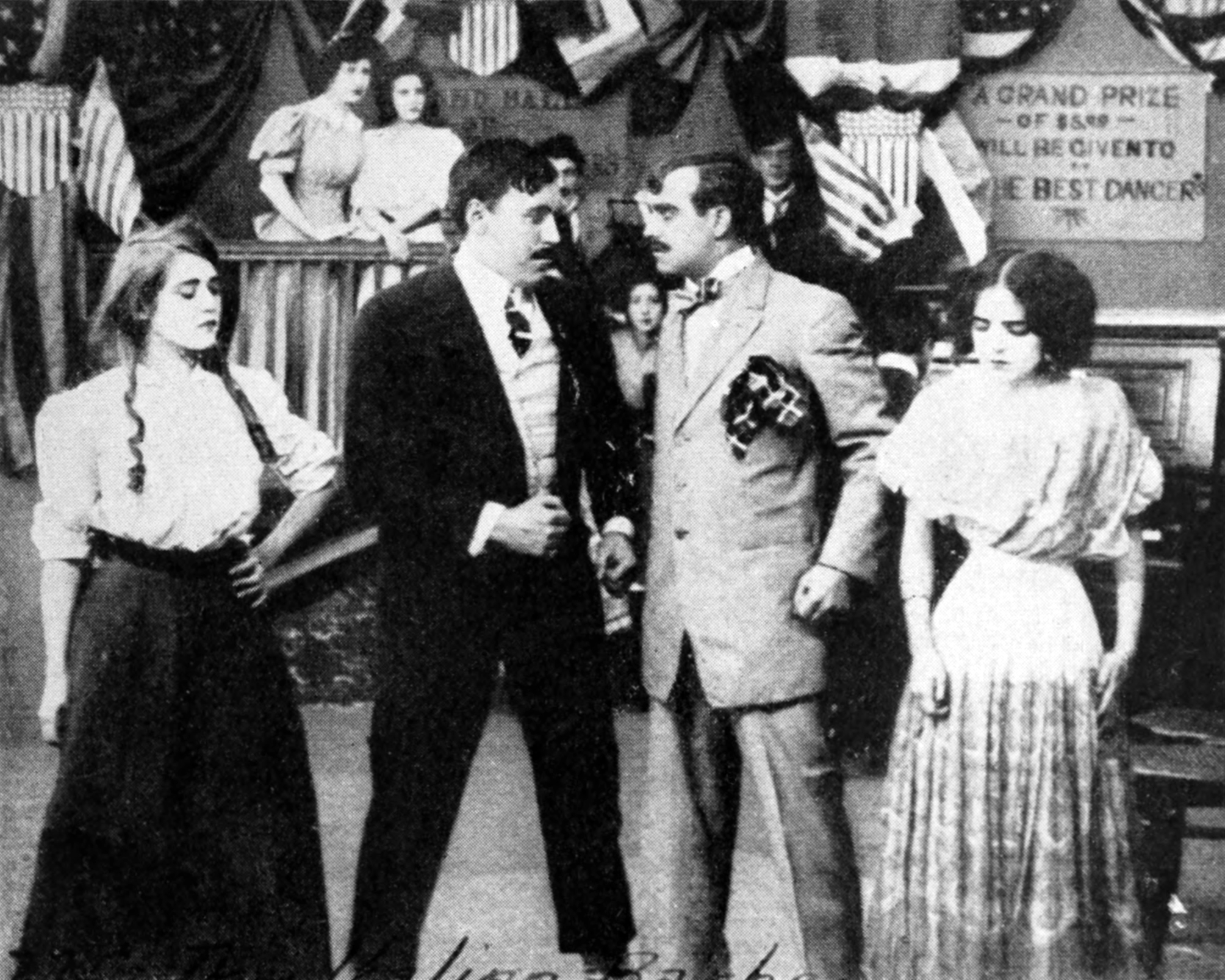
Mary Pickford, Mack Sennett, Joseph Graybill and Marion Sunshine in The Italian Barber (1911)

Joseph Graybill (April 17, 1887 – August 3, 1913) was an American silent film actor. He appeared in several films directed by D.W. Griffith. Graybill joined the Biograph Company around 1909 in New York City. By 1910 Griffith was the main director. Graybill worked with Biograph in 1911 in California.

== Life ==
Joseph Graybill was born Harold Graybill in Kansas City, Missouri on April 14, 1887 to Clarence Frank and Henrietta ("Hattie") E. Graybill. For many years his mother, Henrietta E. Graybill, worked as a Christian Science practitioner. He had a sister named Gladys. From 1894 to 1900 the family lived in Atchison, Kansas. The 1900 U.S. Federal Census shows Graybill, age 14, living in Atchison City, Kansas with his mother and sister. His occupation is listed as "at school". From 1901 to at least 1905 Graybill lived in Milwaukee.

Sometime between 1892 and 1903 Harold's father died. City directories for Kansas City show Frank C. Graybill in 1889 and 1891. A 1903 Milwaukee city directory lists Henrietta as the widow of a man named Frank. The 1905 Wisconsin census shows Harold Graybill living in Milwaukee with his mother and sister Gladys. Harold is listed with the occupation of actor.

== Career ==
Very little is known about Graybill's film and stage career. It is unclear when Graybill left Milwaukee. His first appearance was in a film released in 1909 titled The Light That Came directed by D.W. Griffith.

A few newspaper accounts mention Graybill stage and film acting. In October 1910 Graybill performed in a play titled Miss Patsy (by Sewell Collins) at the (now demolished) Belasco Theatre in Washington, D.C. His character was named Dr. Philip Gentry. In May 1908 Graybill appeared in a performance of "The Witching Hour" by Augustus Thomas at a Cedar Rapids, Iowa theater. In October 1909 he appeared in a performance of "Vasta Herne" by Edward Peple in Des Moines, Iowa. A newspaper review noted that the play opened the three weeks prior in Milwaukee.

A Wisconsin newspaper noted in July 1916 that a film titled "Saved From Himself" was reissued. The paper stated that Mabel Normand appeared opposite "the late Joseph Graybill. Mr. Graybill, it will be remembered, was a young actor of unusual promise who died three years ago."

Two photos of Graybill can be found in the book When the Movies Were Young by Linda Arvidson Griffith (1969). The photos depict scenes in "How She Triumphed" and "The Italian Barber".

== Death ==
Graybill died in New York City on August 3, 1913, according to his death certificate. Different records state conflicting information as to the cause of death. The Internet Movie Database (IMDB) lists it as acute spinal meningitis. The first death notice in the New York Times contradicts the death certificate as to the day of death - it lists the cause of death on August 2 as a nervous breakdown. An obituary on August 4 lists the cause as gastritis. Graybill's death certificate and the first death notice both note he entered Bellevue Hospital July 24. The death certificate states that the cause of death was acute pachymeningitis and a contributory factor was alcohol poisoning.

== Filmography ==
- The Wizard of the Jungle (1913) (as Joe Graybill) .... Captain Hanscombe
- Saving Mabel's Dad (1913)
- The God Within (1912) .... In Bar
- The Star of Bethlehem (1912) .... Roman messenger
- Brutality (1912) .... The Victim of Anger
- The Informer (1912) .... Union Soldier
- Gold and Glitter (1912) .... Lumberman
- The Painted Lady (1912) .... The Stranger
- The Ring of a Spanish Grandee (1912) .... The Suitor
- Rejuvenation (1912) .... The Lighthouse Keeper's Friend
- A Love of Long Ago (1912) .... Pedro, the Spy
- The Girl of the Grove (1912) .... The Wooer
- For Sale—A Life (1912) .... The Ill Husband
- The Root of Evil (1912)
- Flying to Fortune (1912) .... The Invalid Father
- The Arab's Bride (1912) .... The Buyer of the Moor's Daughter
- The Silent Witness (1912) .... The Blackmailer
- On Probation (1912) .... The Younger Brother
- A Blot on the 'Scutcheon (1912) .... A Nobleman
- The Voice of the Child (1911) .... The False Friend
- Saved from Himself (1911) .... The Young Clerk
- The Failure (1911) .... At Fiancée's House
- Through Darkened Vales (1911) .... Howard
- The Battle (1911) .... A Union Officer
- Love in the Hills (1911) .... The City Suitor
- The Long Road (1911) .... In Bar
- The Adventures of Billy (1911) .... Second Tramp
- Italian Blood (1911)
- The Making of a Man (1911) .... Actor/Backstage
- The Baron (1911) .... The Baron's Friend
- The Diving Girl (1911) .... A Bather
- Out from the Shadow (1911)
- The Last Drop of Water (1911) .... John
- A Country Cupid (1911) .... The Half-Wit
- Bobby, the Coward (1911) .... First Thug
- The Primal Call (1911) .... The Millionaire
- Enoch Arden: Part II (1911) .... Dead Shipmate
- Enoch Arden: Part I (1911) .... A Shipwrecked Sailor
- A Romany Tragedy (1911)
- The White Rose of the Wilds (1911) .... Second Outlaw
- The Crooked Road (1911) .... An Evil Companion
- The New Dress (1911) .... At Wedding/At Market/At Cafe
- How She Triumphed (1911) .... The Sweetheart
- Madame Rex (1911)
- Priscilla and the Umbrella (1911) (as Joe Graybill) .... Paul
- Priscilla's April Fool Joke (1911) .... Harry
- The Lonedale Operator (1911) (uncredited) .... A Tramp
- Teaching Dad to Like Her (1911) .... Harry
- Was He a Coward? (1911) .... Hilton's Friend
- Conscience (1911) .... The Hunter
- A Decree of Destiny (1911) .... Kenneth Marsden
- The Heart of a Savage (1911)
- Fisher Folks (1911) .... At Fair
- His Trust (1911) .... Union soldier
- Help Wanted (1911) .... Jack
- The Italian Barber (1911) .... Tony
- Winning Back His Love (1910) .... At Stage Door
- White Roses (1910) .... At Party
- The Lesson (1910) .... James, Reverend Hollister's Son
- His Sister-In-Law (1910)
- Happy Jack, a Hero (1910)
- Turning the Tables (1910) .... Mr. Peck
- Effecting a Cure (1910) .... On Street
- The Fugitive (1910)
- The Broken Doll (1910) .... Victim of Massacre
- In Life's Cycle (1910) .... In Bar
- An Old Story with a New Ending (1910) .... Jay Downs
- When We Were in Our Teens (1910) .... Howard
- The House with Closed Shutters (1910) .... Her suitor
- An Arcadian Maid (1910) .... In Gambling Hall
- The Call to Arms (1910) .... The Lord's Cousin
- As the Bells Rang Out! (1910) .... Wedding Guest
- A Flash of Light (1910) .... Horace Dooley
- What the Daisy Said (1910) (uncredited) .... The Gypsy
- A Midnight Cupid (1910) .... At Party
- Muggsy's First Sweetheart (1910) .... One of Muggsy's Friends
- A Child's Impulse (1910) .... The Other Man
- The Marked Time-Table (1910) .... Tom Powers
- The Face at the Window (1910) .... Ralph Bradford's Son
- A Victim of Jealousy (1910) .... At Reception/In Office
- The Purgation (1910) .... One of the Misguided Youths
- The Light That Came (1909)

== Stage ==
- Miss Patsy by Sewell Collins
- Vasta Herne by Edward Peple
- The Witching Hour by Augustus Thomas
