= The Last Drop of Water =

1911 film directed by D. W. Griffith

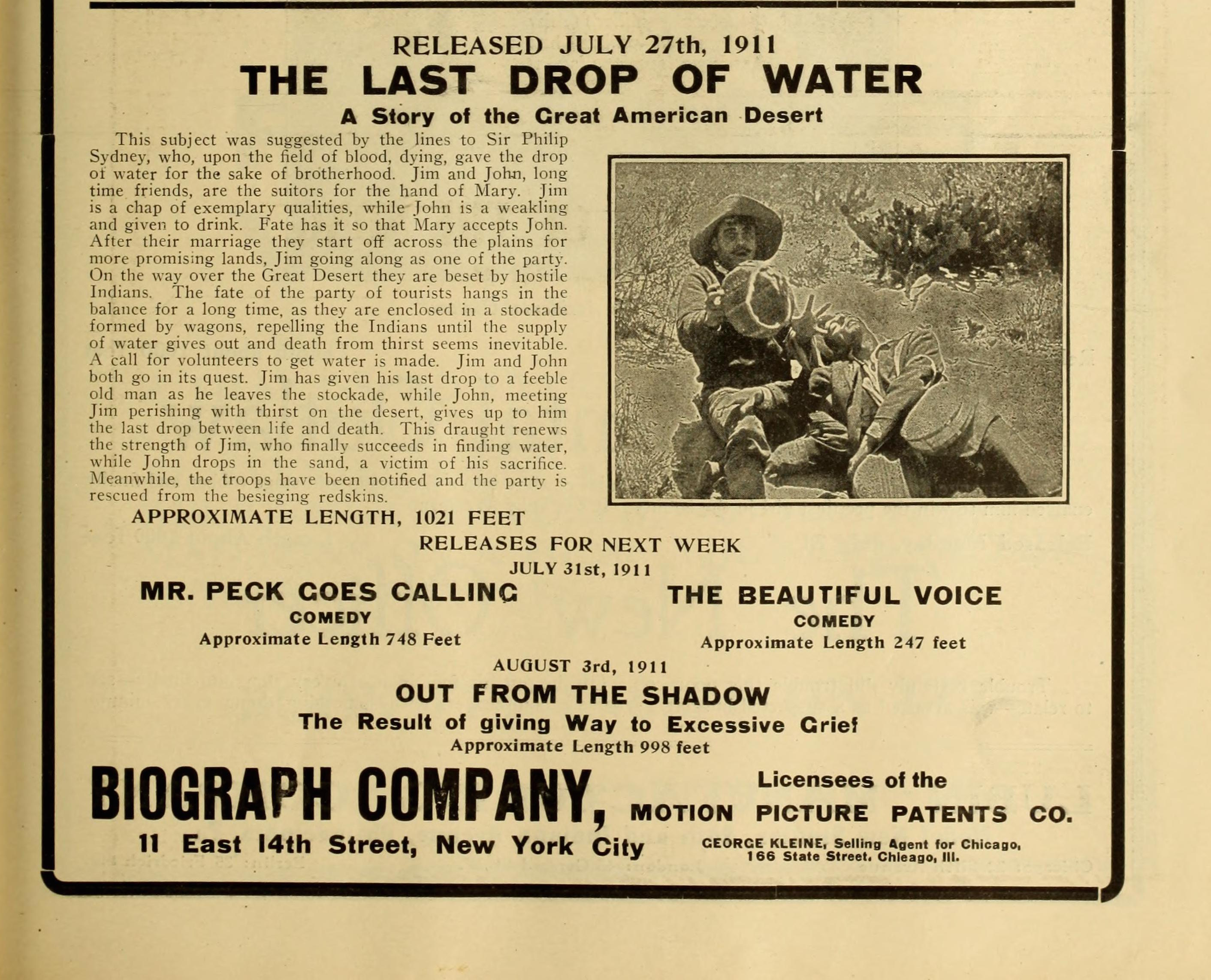
- Theatrical release poster
- Directed by: D. W. Griffith
- Written by: Bret Harte; Stanner E. V. Taylor
- Produced by: D. W. Griffith
- Starring: Blanche Sweet
- Cinematography: G. W. Bitzer
- Distributed by: Biograph Studios
- Release date: July 27, 1911
- Running time: 18 minutes, 1 to 2 reels
- Country: United States
- Language: Silent (English intertitles)

The Last Drop of Water

The Last Drop of Water is a 1911 American short silent Western film directed by D. W. Griffith and starring Blanche Sweet. Three known prints of the film survive. It was filmed in the San Fernando desert as well as Lookout Mountain, California. The film was considered the "most ambitious film made by Griffith during the California trip of 1911" before the Biograph company moved back to New York. It was filmed on or between May 14 and May 20, 1911. It was reissued by Biograph on August 13, 1915.

== Cast ==
- Blanche Sweet as Mary
- Charles West as Jim
- Robert Harron as In Wagon Train
- Dell Henderson as Undetermined Role
- Alfred Paget as An Indian / In Wagon Train
- Francis J. Grandon as John's Friend / In Wagon Train
- W. Chrystie Miller
- Jeanie MacPherson as In Wagon Train
- Joseph Graybill as John
- William J. Butler

== Plot ==
Two men who are friends, John and Jim, compete for the hand of Mary before they start on their journey westward. Mary is betrothed to John but she soon finds out about his lush behaviors. Native Americans ambush the train; the attack leaves the party with a low supply of water. Fearing dehydration and because of need both John and Jim set out for water. Jim gives water to an older gentleman while John gives Jim the last drop of water, thus sacrificing himself for the train to continue on westward. Jim finds a water supply with the energy John gave to him with his last drop of water and the train is then rescued by the troops.

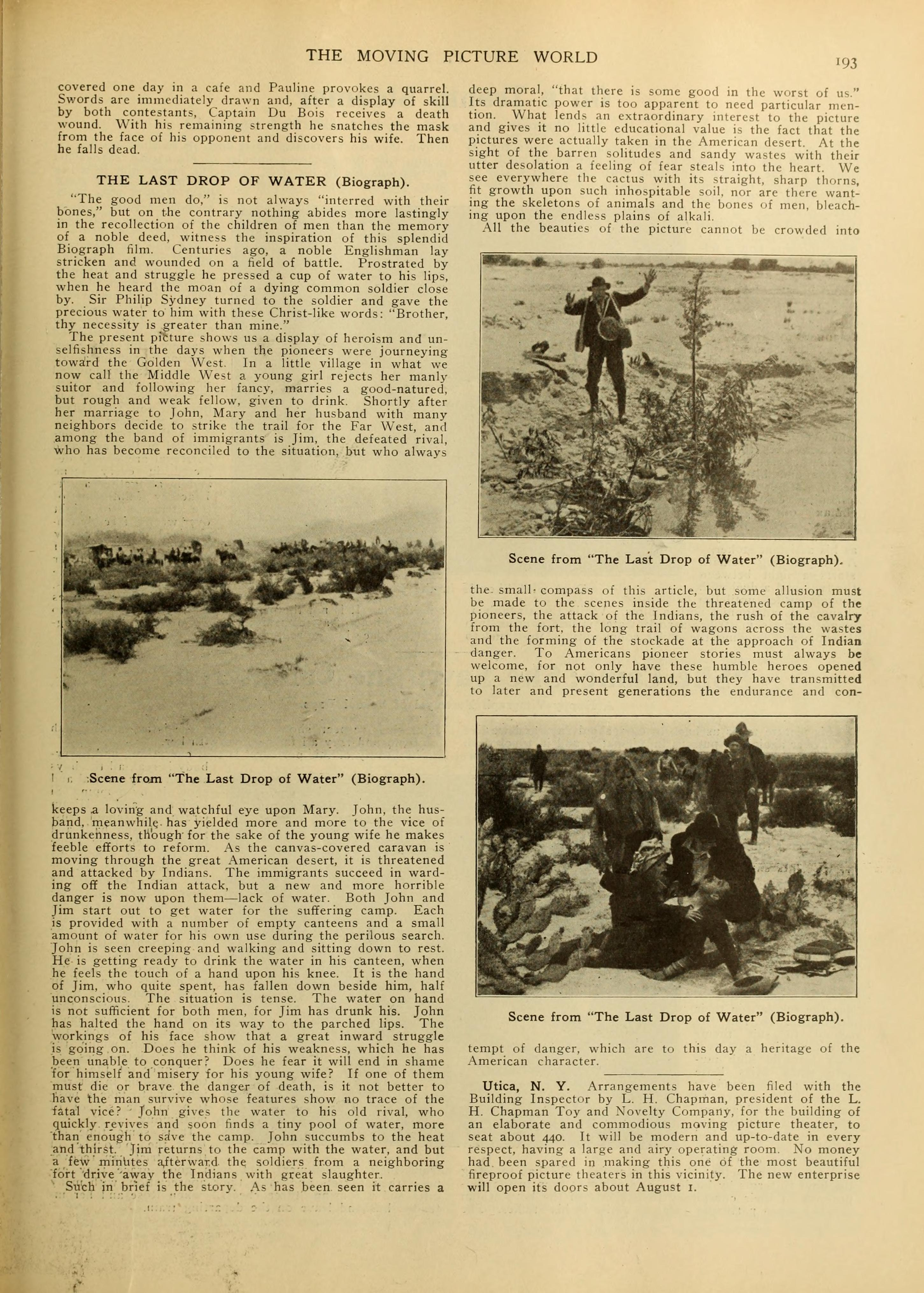
A page out of the first trade paper called Moving Picture World reviewing The Last Drop of Water; includes stills from the film.

== Publicity and preproduction ==
The Last Drop of Water was promoted as having "extras well above 200" to show the detail and money going into the Western. The Biograph Company was heavily promoting the film at one of the highest states of production within the film industry of its day—trying to prove its modernity in the state of change within the film industry. This is considered to be Griffith's way of continuing his career since the Western by this time was losing popularity; this was his late break into the Western genre. The title of the film changed from "In a Wagon Train Going Westward in the 1800s" but was changed prior to the film's release date. California had a variety of environments that were used within the film; it was starting to become popular with filmmakers because of the access to natural and various landscapes.

== Themes ==
The whole film is an allusion to the life of Sir Philip Sydney and his martyred death of giving all his resources as he lay dying on the battlefield, this reference is given during the first inter-title of the movie.

White actors did redface in this film to portray American Indians as savages and continued the stereotype of the "aggressive savage" as well as the tumultuous relations with the tribes in the West as white Americans were immigrating towards California, indicative of manifest destiny.

This film was the precursor to a later film The Covered Wagon which The Western, from silents to cinerama describes both films as having "the same poetry" though Griffith's film is "more exciting" because of his use of cross-cutting to accentuate the action in The Last Drop of Water. It is also one of Griffith's films where plot and action are on the same level as opposed to a focus on the action of film.

== Linda Arvidson's memoir ==
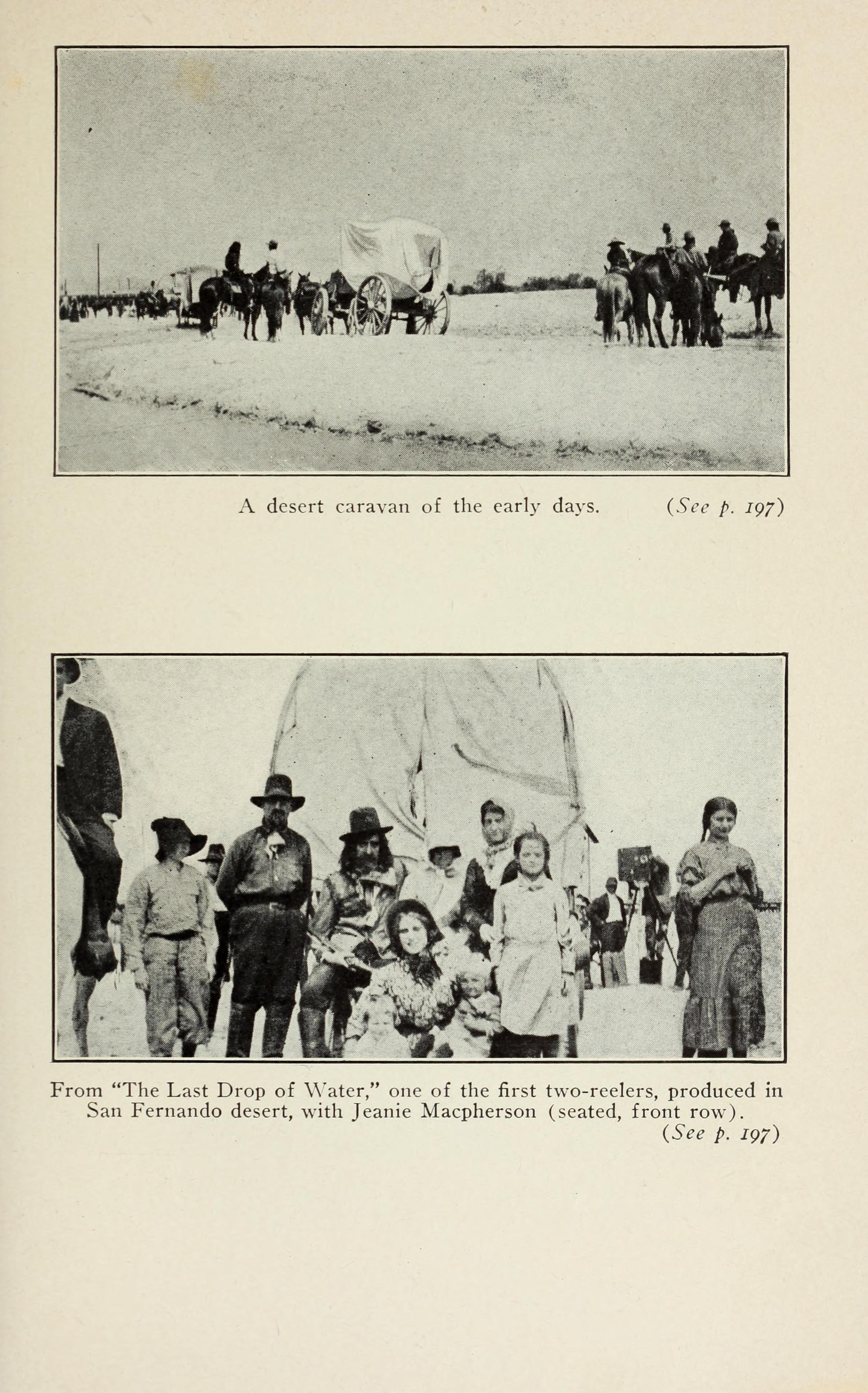
Personal photographs of the cast of The Last Drop of Water from Linda Arvidson, ex-wife of D.W. Griffith

Linda Arvidson wrote a memoir about her time with her husband D. W. Griffith after their separation, about her time working in the movie industry during the earliest years with him. Griffith was coming down from his enormous success of his 1911 film Enoch Arden and wanted to make a film because he "listened to the call of the desert". They went to California because other companies were setting up there and the Griffiths wanted to take advantage of California's offerings in the early beginning of Los Angeles. Their company was on salary at this time and went on to California with a few scripts to produce movies. Mrs. Griffith refers to the film in her own words as a "big epic of a pioneer romance". She goes on to describe how the camp to film the movie looked like a small town because of the expansive crew and extras working on set, the regulars of the film and the women extras were put up in a nearby hotel. They had to do a retake because there was static within the film. Mrs. Griffith goes on to praise the artistic direction of the film compared to the "salacious" others during their day.

== See also ==
- D. W. Griffith filmography
- Blanche Sweet filmography
