= The White Rose of the Wilds =

1911 film directed by D. W. Griffith

- Directed by: D. W. Griffith
- Written by: Bret Harte; Frank E. Woods
- Starring: Blanche Sweet
- Cinematography: G. W. Bitzer
- Distributed by: Biograph Company
- Release date: May 25, 1911
- Running time: 17 minutes
- Country: United States
- Language: Silent (English intertitles)

The White Rose of the Wilds is a 1911 American short silent drama film directed by D. W. Griffith and starring Blanche Sweet.

== Cast ==
- Blanche Sweet as White Rose
- Robert Harron as White Rose's Brother
- W. Chrystie Miller as White Rose's Father
- Wilfred Lucas as First Outlaw
- Joseph Graybill as Second Outlaw
- Donald Crisp
- Mack Sennett

== See also ==
- D. W. Griffith filmography
- Blanche Sweet filmography
