= Always Faithful =

1929 film

- Directed by: Alfred A. Cohn
- Produced by: The Vitaphone Corporation
- Starring: Blanche Sweet
- Cinematography: William Rees
- Distributed by: Warner Bros.
- Release date: December 31, 1929 (United States)
- Running time: 10 minutes
- Country: United States
- Language: English

Always Faithful (also known as Blanche Sweet in Always Faithful) is a 1929 American Pre-Code short film produced by The Vitaphone Corporation in conjunction with Warner Bros., which distributed the film.

The film marks the sound film debut of veteran film actress Blanche Sweet who began her screen career in 1909 as a teenager working for D. W. Griffith. It is preserved at the Library of Congress who recently restored it for showing at the National Gallery of Art.

== Cast ==
- Blanche Sweet as Mrs. George W. Mason
- William B. Davidson as George W. Mason
- John Litel as Wayne
- Charles B. Middleton

== See also ==
- Blanche Sweet filmography
