= A Romance of the Western Hills =

1910 film directed by D. W. Griffith

- Directed by: D. W. Griffith
- Written by: Stanner E. V. Taylor
- Starring: Mary Pickford; Blanche Sweet
- Cinematography: G. W. Bitzer
- Distributed by: Biograph Company
- Release date: April 11, 1910
- Running time: 16 minutes
- Country: United States
- Language: Silent (English intertitles)

A Romance of the Western Hills is a 1910 silent short drama film directed by D. W. Griffith, starring Mary Pickford and Blanche Sweet. A print of the film survives in the film archive of the Library of Congress.

== Cast ==
- Mary Pickford as Indian
- Alfred Paget as Indian
- Arthur V. Johnson as Indian
- Kate Bruce as Tourist
- Dell Henderson as Tourist
- Blanche Sweet
- Charles West as The Nephew
- Dorothy West as Tourist
- Kathlyn Williams as Second Woman

== See also ==
- List of American films of 1910
- D. W. Griffith filmography
- Mary Pickford filmography
- Blanche Sweet filmography
- Whitewashing in film
