= Near to Earth =

1913 film

- Directed by: D. W. Griffith
- Written by: James Cerr
- Starring: Lionel Barrymore
- Cinematography: G. W. Bitzer
- Distributed by: Biograph Company; General Film Company
- Release date: March 20, 1913
- Running time: 17 minutes (16 frame/s)
- Country: United States
- Language: Silent (English intertitles)

Near to Earth is a 1913 American silent drama film directed by D. W. Griffith.

== Cast ==
- Lionel Barrymore as Gato
- Robert Harron as Gato's brother
- Gertrude Bambrick as Gato's sweetheart
- Mae Marsh as one of Gato's sweetheart's friends
- Kathleen Butler as one of Gato's sweetheart's friends
- Walter Miller as the stranger
- Dorothy Bernard
- Christy Cabanne as a businessman
- Harry Carey
- Donald Crisp
- Charles Hill Mailes
- Joseph McDermott as a businessman
- Mabel Normand
- Frank Opperman as a friend
- Wallace Reid
- Blanche Sweet

== See also ==
- Harry Carey filmography
- D. W. Griffith filmography
- Blanche Sweet filmography
- Lionel Barrymore filmography
- Wallace Reid filmography
