= A Woman of Pleasure =

1919 film by Wallace Worsley

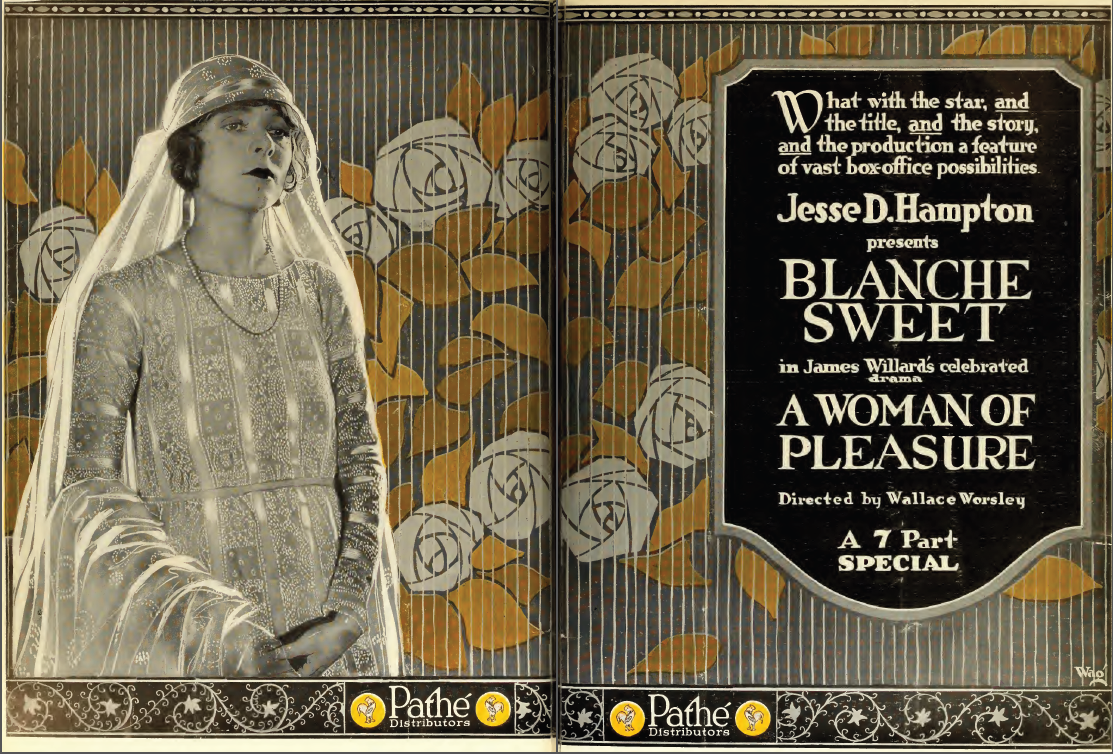
- Theatrical release poster
- Directed by: Wallace Worsley
- Written by: George Elwood Jenks, adaptation from James Willard's drama
- Produced by: Jesse D. Hampton
- Starring: Blanche Sweet; Wheeler Oakman; Wilfred Lucas
- Cinematography: William C. Foster
- Edited by: K.E. Anderson
- Distributed by: Pathé Exchange
- Release date: November 19, 1919
- Country: United States
- Languages: Silent; English intertitles

A Woman of Pleasure is a lost 1919 American silent drama film directed by Wallace Worsley and starring Blanche Sweet. It was distributed by Pathé Exchange in the United States.

== Cast ==
- Blanche Sweet as Alice Dane
- Wheeler Oakman as Bobby Ralston
- Wilfred Lucas as Sir John Thornbull
- Wesley Barry as Danny Thomas
- Frederick Star as Cetygoola
- Milton Ross as Jim Dench
- Josef Swickard as Rev. Mr. Goddard
- Spottiswoode Aitken as Wilberforce Pace

== See also ==
- Blanche Sweet filmography
