= The Lily of the Tenements =

1911 film directed by D. W. Griffith

- Directed by: D. W. Griffith
- Starring: Clara T. Bracy
- Cinematography: G. W. Bitzer
- Distributed by: Biograph Company
- Release date: February 27, 1911
- Running time: 17 minutes
- Country: United States
- Language: Silent (English intertitles)

The Lily of the Tenements is a 1911 American short silent drama film directed by D. W. Griffith, starring Clara T. Bracy and featuring Blanche Sweet.

== Cast ==
- Dorothy West as The Tenement Girl
- Clara T. Bracy as The Tenement Girl's Mother
- W. Chrystie Miller as The Tenement Girl's Father
- George Nichols as Tenement Owner
- William J. Butler as One of the Father's Friends
- Donald Crisp
- Francis J. Grandon as The Doctor
- Arthur V. Johnson
- Adolph Lestina as One of the Father's Friends
- Owen Moore
- Alfred Paget as A Customer
- W. C. Robinson as The Butler
- Blanche Sweet

== Preservation ==
A paper print is preserved by the Library of Congress.

== See also ==
- D. W. Griffith filmography
- Blanche Sweet filmography
