= The Smile of a Child =

1911 film directed by D. W. Griffith

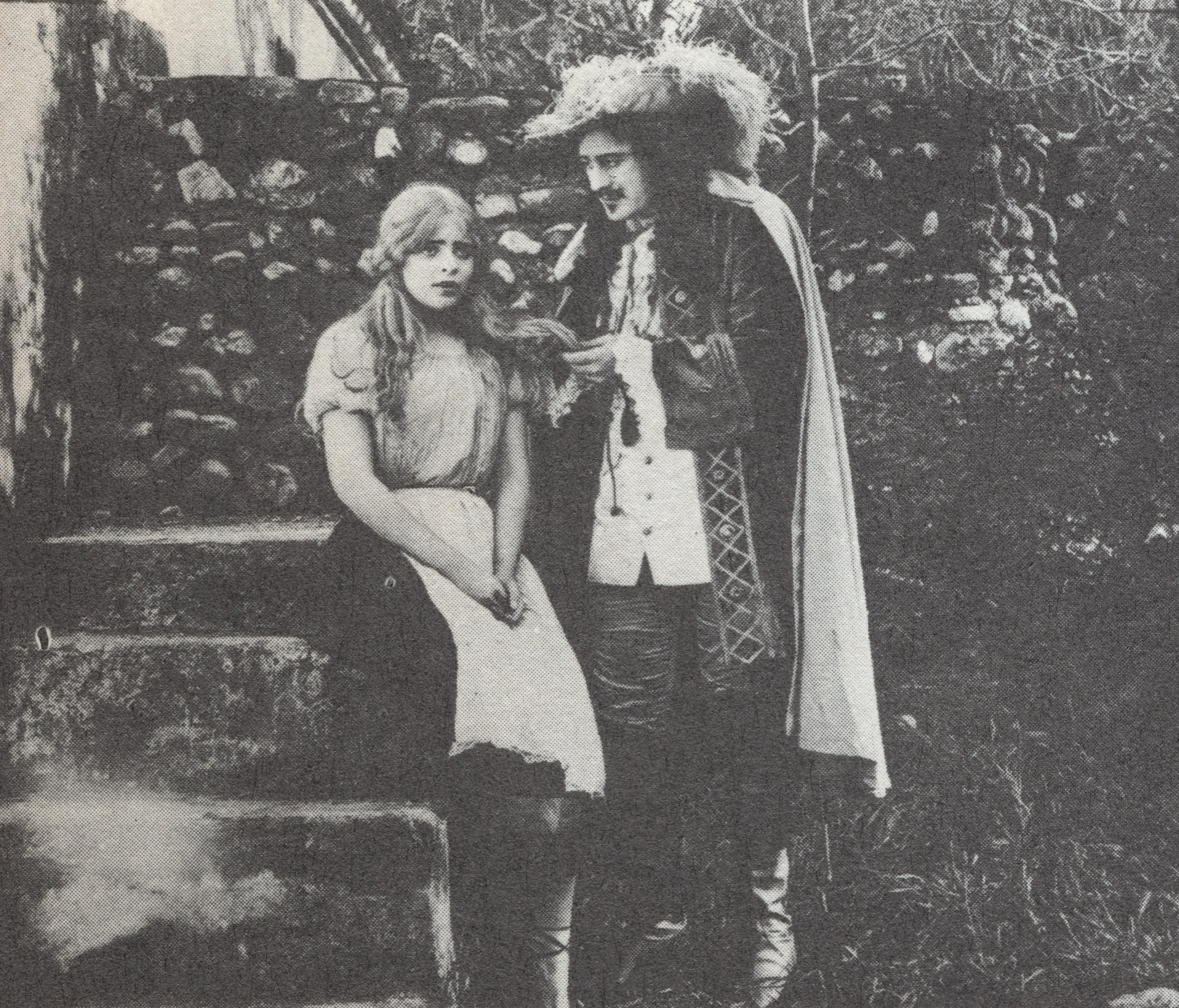
- Directed by: D. W. Griffith
- Written by: Maie B. Havey
- Starring: Blanche Sweet
- Cinematography: G. W. Bitzer
- Distributed by: Biograph Company
- Release date: June 5, 1911
- Country: United States
- Language: Silent (English intertitles)

The Smile of a Child (also known as A Smile of a Child) is a 1911 American short silent drama film directed by D. W. Griffith and starring Blanche Sweet.

== Cast ==
- Blanche Sweet as The Peasant Woman
- Edwin August
- W. Chrystie Miller
- Baden Powell as The Child

== Plot ==
An irritable prince is moved by the smile of a child, which gradually softens his demeanor. The same smile later proves instrumental in aiding the child's mother.

== See also ==
- D. W. Griffith filmography
- Blanche Sweet filmography
