= Out from the Shadow =

1911 film directed by D. W. Griffith

- Directed by: D. W. Griffith
- Starring: Blanche Sweet
- Distributed by: Biograph Company
- Release date: August 3, 1911
- Country: United States
- Language: Silent (English intertitles)

Out from the Shadow is a 1911 American short silent drama film directed by D. W. Griffith and starring Blanche Sweet.

== Cast ==
- Blanche Sweet as Mrs. Vane
- Edwin August as Mr. Vane
- Jeanie MacPherson as The Young Widow
- Donald Crisp as At Dance
- John T. Dillon as At Dance (as Jack Dillon)
- Joseph Graybill
- Charles Hill Mailes as At Dance
- Alfred Paget as At Dance
- Marion Sunshine as At Dance
- Charles West as At Dance

== See also ==
- D. W. Griffith filmography
- Blanche Sweet filmography
