= Love in the Hills =

1911 film directed by D. W. Griffith

- Directed by: D. W. Griffith
- Written by: Dell Henderson
- Starring: Blanche Sweet
- Cinematography: G. W. Bitzer
- Distributed by: Biograph Company
- Release date: October 30, 1911
- Running time: 18 minutes
- Country: United States
- Language: Silent (English intertitles)

Love in the Hills is a 1911 American short silent drama film directed by D. W. Griffith and starring Blanche Sweet.

== Cast ==
- Blanche Sweet as The Girl
- Wilfred Lucas as The Manley Suitor
- Charles West as The Shiftless Suitor
- Joseph Graybill as The City Suitor
- Kate Toncray as The Girl's Mother

== See also ==
- D. W. Griffith filmography
- Blanche Sweet filmography
