= Priscilla and the Umbrella =

1911 film

- Directed by: Frank Powell; Mack Sennett
- Written by: Frank E. Woods
- Starring: Florence Barker
- Distributed by: Biograph Company
- Release date: April 3, 1911
- Country: United States
- Language: Silent with English intertitles

Priscilla and the Umbrella is a 1911 American short silent comedy film directed by Frank Powell and Mack Sennett, starring Florence Barker and featuring Blanche Sweet.

== Cast ==
- Florence Barker as Priscilla
- Joseph Graybill as Paul (as Joe Graybill)
- Edward Dillon as Harry
- Grace Henderson as The Mother
- William J. Butler as The Father
- Blanche Sweet as The Sister

== Critical reception ==
A review in Motography found that the film's action maintained interest throughout its length. "The actors play with an extraordinary amount of zest," it said, "and this quality probably accounts in large measure for the success of the film."

== See also ==
- Blanche Sweet filmography
