= All on Account of the Milk =

1910 short film

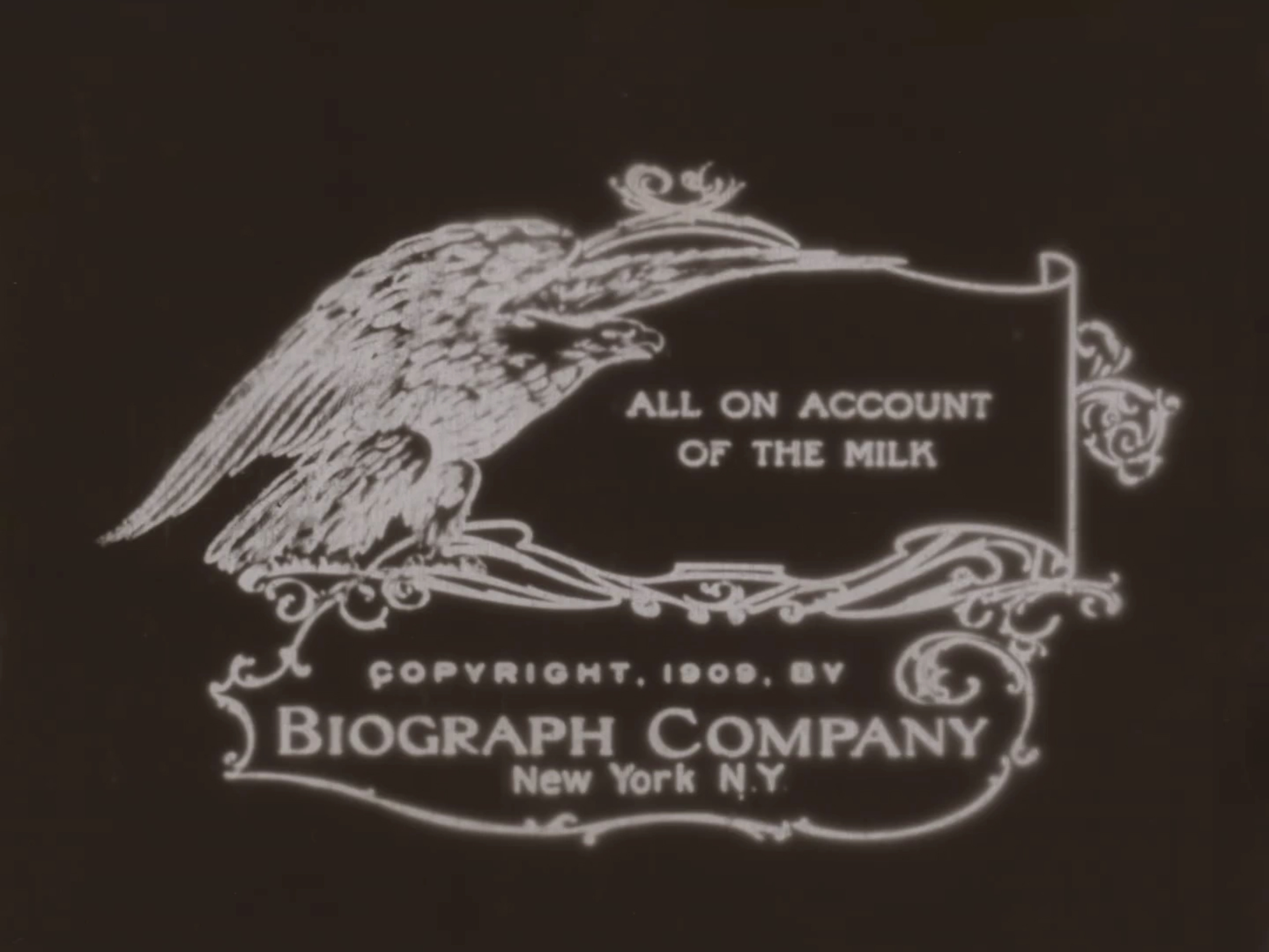
- Title card
- Directed by: Frank Powell
- Produced by: D. W. Griffith
- Starring: Mary Pickford; Blanche Sweet
- Cinematography: Arthur Marvin
- Distributed by: Biograph Company
- Release date: January 15, 1910
- Running time: 11 minutes (1 reel; 989 feet)
- Country: United States
- Language: Silent (English intertitles)

Full film at reduced speed

All on Account of the Milk is a 1910 American silent comedy short film directed by Frank Powell and starring Mary Pickford and Blanche Sweet. The short was shot in Fort Lee, New Jersey, by the Biograph Company using one of the many early film studios in America's first motion picture industry that were based there at the beginning of the 20th century. A print of the film survives, and it was distributed as a one-reel production.

== Plot ==
A well-dressed young contractor arrives on a construction site and changes into overalls. He goes to buy some milk at a nearby house. A young woman takes over the duties of the ill maid and dons her apron. The man and woman are attracted to each other, and each believing the other to be of lower social status, keep up their masquerades when the man shows up the next day on the same errand. When he gets a bit fresh with her, she rebuffs him and retreats into the house, pretending to be very upset. He drains the milk out of his container and asks for more. She decides to play a trick on him, and pours some other liquid into the can. He makes advances again, but she plays hard to get, even though she secretly likes being kissed on the cheek. Eventually, though, she lets him kiss her hand.

Later, the man's mother informs him he is wanted in the city. He decides he cannot leave without another visit with the pretty maid. However, the real maid's sweetheart, is angered when he shows up. When the maid comes out, the contractor is puzzled. The young woman's mother sends him away. Just then, the young woman returns. She hurriedly puts on the maid's apron and runs to the man. The maid's sweetheart, mistaking the woman for his girlfriend, grabs a shovel to hit the contractor over the head, but then recognizes the young woman. The sweetheart returns to the maid and recounts what happened. The young woman's mother overhears and goes to fetch her daughter. The contractor's mother arrives, and it turns out that the two mothers know each other. Everything is made clear, much to the delight of the young woman.

== Cast ==
- Mary Pickford as The Young Woman
- Kate Bruce as The Young Woman's Mother
- Blanche Sweet as The Maid
- Mack Sennett as The Farmhand
- Arthur V. Johnson as The Young Contractor
- Flora Finch
- Jack Pickford at construction site

== Preservation ==
A paper print of the film is preserved in the collection of the Library of Congress.

== See also ==
- List of American films of 1910
- Mary Pickford filmography
- Blanche Sweet filmography
