= How She Triumphed =

1911 film directed by D. W. Griffith

- Directed by: D. W. Griffith
- Written by: Linda Arvidson
- Starring: Blanche Sweet
- Cinematography: G. W. Bitzer
- Distributed by: Biograph Company
- Release date: April 27, 1911
- Running time: 17 minutes
- Country: United States
- Language: Silent (English intertitles)

How She Triumphed is a 1911 American short silent romantic drama film directed by D. W. Griffith and starring Blanche Sweet. The film is now considered lost.

== Cast ==
- Blanche Sweet as Mary
- Vivian Prescott as Mary's Cousin
- Joseph Graybill as The Sweetheart
- Kate Bruce
- Florence La Badie
- Charles West

== See also ==
- D. W. Griffith filmography
- Blanche Sweet filmography
