= The Primal Call =

1911 silent film by D. W. Griffith

- Directed by: D. W. Griffith
- Written by: Emmett C. Hall
- Starring: Wilfred Lucas
- Cinematography: G. W. Bitzer
- Production company: Biograph Company
- Distributed by: General Film Company
- Release date: June 22, 1911
- Running time: 17 minutes
- Country: United States
- Language: Silent (English intertitles)

The Primal Call is a 1911 American short silent romance film directed by D. W. Griffith, starring Wilfred Lucas and featuring Blanche Sweet.

== Cast ==
- Wilfred Lucas as The Fisherman
- Claire McDowell as The Woman
- Grace Henderson as The Woman's Mother
- Dell Henderson as The Creditor
- Joseph Graybill as The Millionaire
- John T. Dillon as The Millionaire's Friend / At Club (as Jack Dillon)
- Vivian Prescott as The Millionaire's Girlfriend
- Donald Crisp
- Blanche Sweet
- Kate Toncray as The Woman's Maid

== See also ==
- D. W. Griffith filmography
- Blanche Sweet filmography
