= The Deadlier Sex =

1920 film

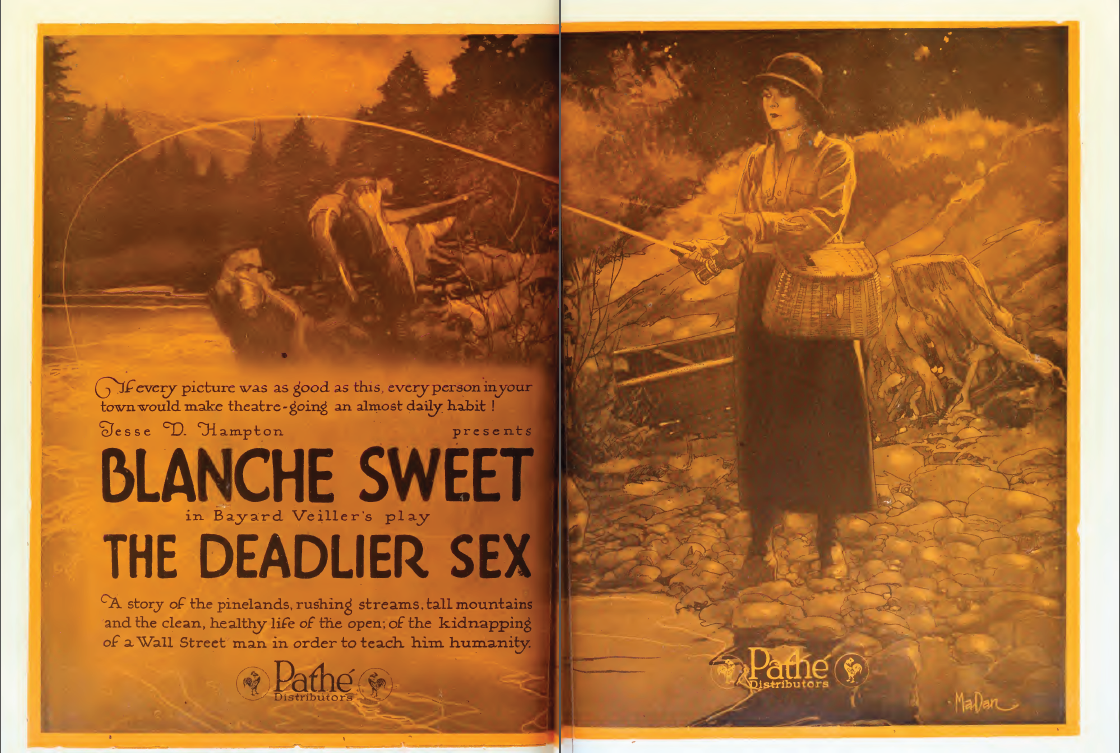
- Ad for film
- Directed by: Robert Thornby
- Story by: Fred Myton (screenplay); Bayard Veiller (short story)
- Produced by: Jesse D. Hampton
- Starring: Blanche Sweet; Winter Hall; Boris Karloff (small role)
- Cinematography: Charles E. Kaufman
- Production company: Jesse D. Hampton Productions
- Distributed by: Pathé Exchange
- Release date: March 28, 1920
- Running time: 6 reels (60 minutes)
- Country: United States
- Language: Silent (English intertitles)

The Deadlier Sex is a 1920 American silent drama-comedy film directed by Robert Thornby which stars Blanche Sweet and features Boris Karloff, and was distributed by Pathé Exchange. The screenplay was written by Fred Myton, based on a short story by Bayard Veiller. It was filmed in Truckee, California. This film was recently restored by the Academy Film Archive and still exists.

== Plot ==
Mary Willard, who has taken control of her father's interests after his death, has become so exasperated at the unscrupulous business practices of her competitor Harvey Judson that she has him kidnapped to teach him a lesson and protect her shareholders against him.

When Harvey wakes up in the middle of a forest, he initially believes that robbery was the motive until he discovers that no money was taken. He tries to bribe his guide to take him to the nearest settlement but to no avail, and, after two fistfights with a Frenchman who is also in love with Mary, eventually comes up with a scheme which leads to his being rescued by his friends.

When Harvey finds out that Mary was behind the kidnapping, they argue and he accuses her of trying to ruin his business. While on the way to the nearest train station, they have an automobile accident that nearly kills them. At the station, after they are told that the government has seized their property, Mary and Harvey decide to join forces and work together in the future.

== Cast ==
- Blanche Sweet as Mary Willard
- Winter Hall as Henry Willard
- Roy Laidlaw as Huntley Green
- Mahlon Hamilton as Harvey Judson
- Russell Simpson as Jim Willis
- Boris Karloff as Jules Borney, French fur trader

== Reception ==
While the outdoor scenes were appreciated and the cast described as strong, the story was criticized as being illogical and the characters undeveloped.

Tagline: "A Drama of a Modern Girl in Whose Breast Flame the Spirits of Mona Lisa, Cleopatra and Sappho. A Drama of Big Emotions Set in the Big Outdoors. A Super Production You'll Long Remember!" (print ad in the Bourbon News, ((Paris, Kentucky)) 6 December 1921)

== Preservation status ==
The Deadlier Sex was preserved by the Academy Film Archive in 2014. The restored print was shown on June 1, 2015 at the San Francisco Silent Film Festival. Lobster Films also carries a print.

== See also ==
- Boris Karloff filmography
- Blanche Sweet filmography
