= Heart Beats of Long Ago =

1911 film directed by D. W. Griffith

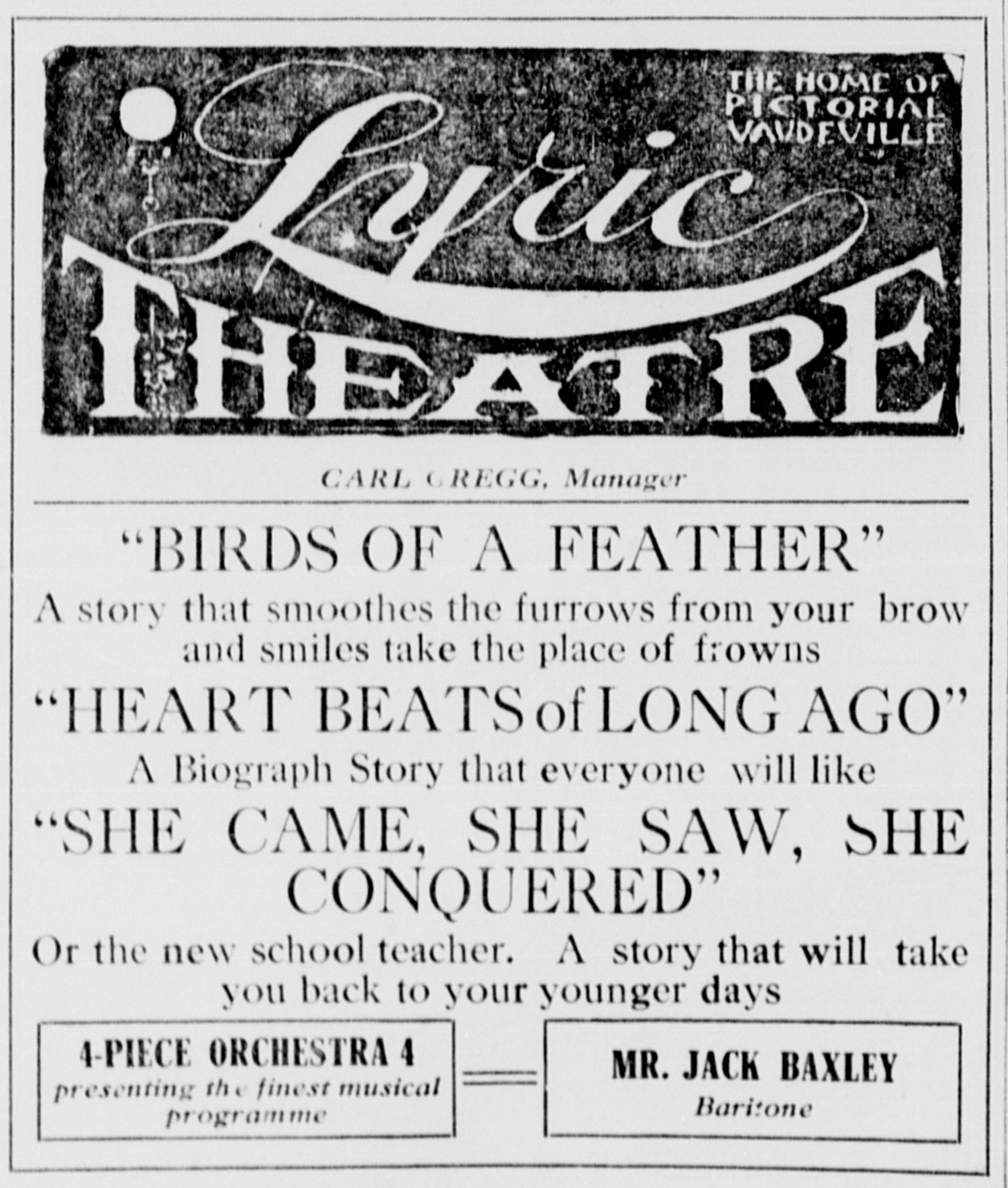
- Newspaper advertisement for Heart Beats of Long Ago and other films
- Directed by: D. W. Griffith
- Starring: George Nichols
- Cinematography: G. W. Bitzer
- Distributed by: Biograph Company
- Release date: February 6, 1911
- Running time: 17 minutes
- Country: United States
- Language: Silent (English intertitles)

Heart Beats of Long Ago is a 1911 American short silent drama film directed by D. W. Griffith, starring George Nichols and featuring Blanche Sweet. The film is preserved in the Library of Congress as a paper print.

== Cast ==
- George Nichols as The Father
- Dorothy West as The Daughter
- Wilfred Lucas as The Lover
- Donald Crisp as Courtier
- Blanche Sweet
- Kate Toncray as Lady-in-Waiting

== See also ==
- D. W. Griffith filmography
- Blanche Sweet filmography
