= If We Only Knew =

1913 film

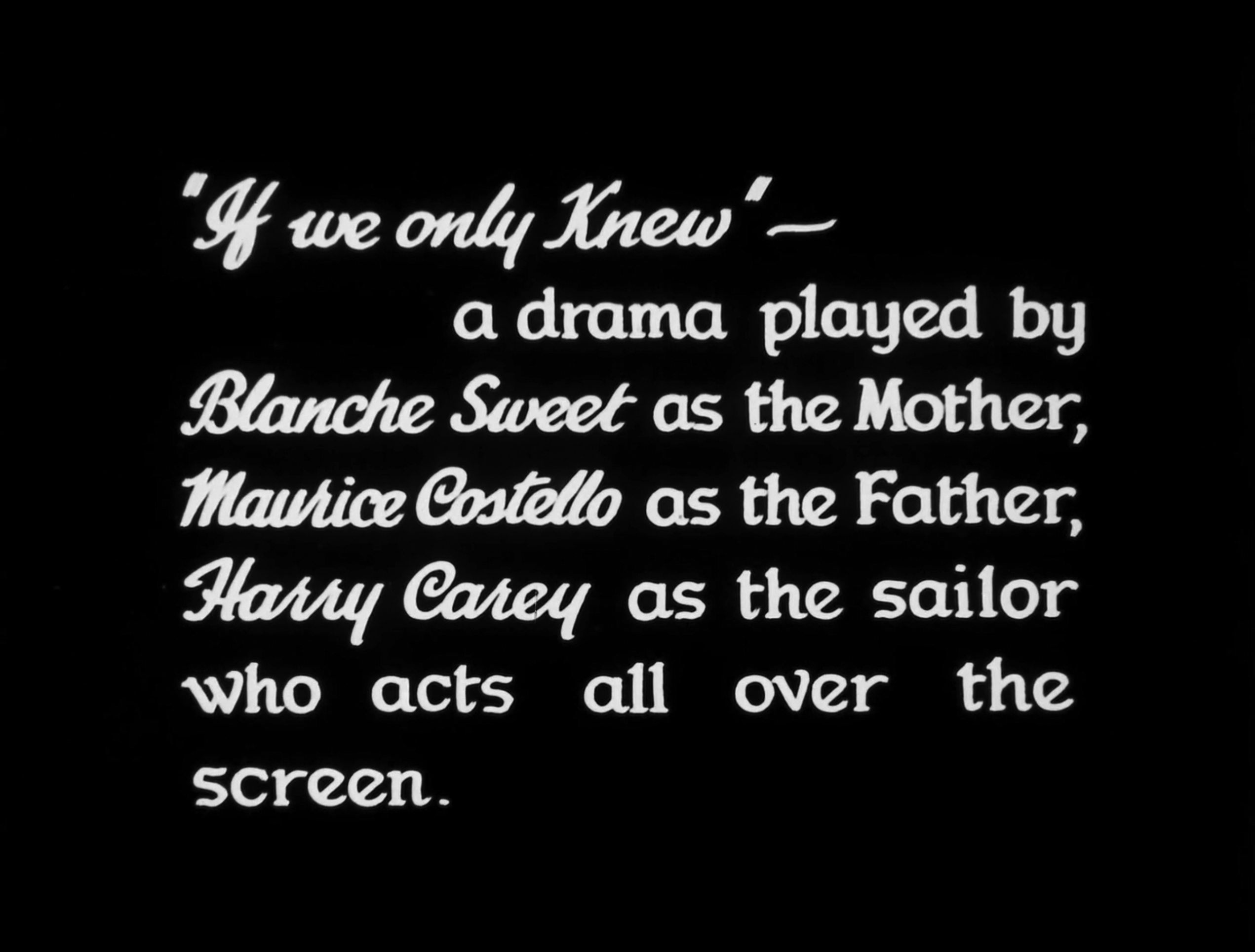
- Title card
- Directed by: D. W. Griffith
- Written by: George Hennessy
- Starring: Henry B. Walthall; Blanche Sweet
- Distributed by: Biograph Company
- Release date: May 1, 1913 (U.S.)
- Country: United States
- Language: Silent (English intertitles)

If We Only Knew is a 1913 American silent short drama film directed by D. W. Griffith and starring Blanche Sweet.

== Plot ==
If We Only Knew (1913)

A wealthy couple leave their young daughter with a nanny while attending a social engagement. The child wanders outside with her doll and reaches the beach, where she enters an unattended boat that drifts out to sea. Local fishermen discover the child and take her to their modest home. The nanny, who had been reading, notices the child's absence and alerts the parents. Upon returning, the parents find only the child's bonnet and doll carriage near the shore and conclude she has drowned.

== Cast ==
- Henry B. Walthall as the father
- Blanche Sweet as the mother
- Harry Carey as the sailor
- William Courtright as the minister

== See also ==
- Harry Carey filmography
- D. W. Griffith filmography
- Blanche Sweet filmography
