= Priscilla's April Fool Joke =

1911 film

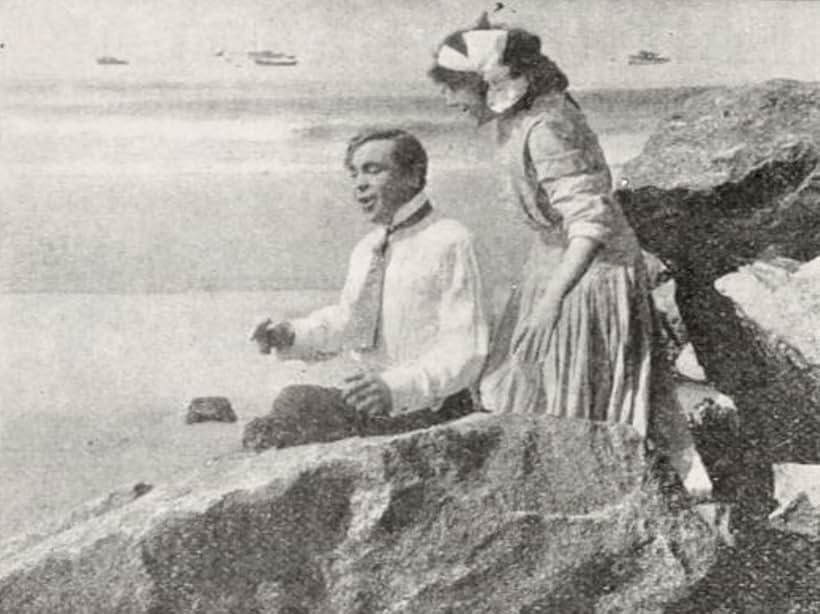
- Directed by: Frank Powell
- Written by: Frank E. Woods
- Starring: Florence Barker
- Cinematography: Percy Higginson
- Distributed by: Biograph Company
- Release date: March 27, 1911
- Country: United States
- Languages: Silent; English intertitles

Priscilla's April Fool Joke is a 1911 American short silent comedy film directed by Frank Powell. It stars Florence Barker as Priscilla and features Blanche Sweet.

== Cast ==
- Florence Barker as Priscilla
- Joseph Graybill as Harry
- Edward Dillon as Paul
- Stephanie Longfellow as Alice
- Vivian Prescott
- Dorothy West as Unidentified Role
- William Beaudine as On Lawn
- Blanche Sweet as On Lawn

== See also ==
- Blanche Sweet filmography
