= A Sister's Love =

1912 film

- Directed by: D. W. Griffith
- Written by: E. G. Pierson
- Starring: Blanche Sweet; Wilfred Lucas
- Cinematography: G. W. Bitzer
- Distributed by: Biograph Company
- Release date: February 8, 1912
- Country: United States
- Language: Silent (English intertitles)

A Sister's Love is a 1912 American short silent drama film directed by D. W. Griffith and starring Blanche Sweet.

== Cast ==
- Wilfred Lucas
- Dorothy Bernard
- Blanche Sweet

== See also ==
- List of American films of 1912
- D. W. Griffith filmography
- Blanche Sweet filmography
