= The Stuff Heroes Are Made Of =

1911 film directed by D. W. Griffith

- Directed by: D. W. Griffith; Frank Powell
- Starring: Blanche Sweet; Edwin August
- Cinematography: G. W. Bitzer
- Distributed by: Biograph Company
- Release date: September 4, 1911
- Running time: 17 minutes
- Country: United States
- Language: Silent (English intertitles)

The Stuff Heroes Are Made Of is a 1911 American short silent drama film directed by D. W. Griffith and Frank Powell and starring Blanche Sweet. A print exists in the Museum of Modern Art film archive.

== Cast ==
- Edwin August as The Young Author
- Blanche Sweet as Alice
- Marion Sunshine as Jennie
- Jack Pickford

== See also ==
- D. W. Griffith filmography
- Blanche Sweet filmography
