= The Voice of the Child =

1911 film by D. W. Griffith

- Directed by: D. W. Griffith
- Written by: George Hennessy
- Starring: Edwin August
- Cinematography: G. W. Bitzer
- Release date: December 28, 1911
- Running time: 18 minutes (16 frame/s)
- Country: United States
- Language: Silent (English intertitles)

The Voice of the Child is a 1911 American drama film directed by D. W. Griffith and starring Blanche Sweet. The film was made by the American Mutoscope and Biograph Company when it and many other early film studios in America's first motion picture industry were based in Fort Lee, New Jersey at the beginning of the 20th century.

== Cast ==
- Edwin August as The Husband
- Blanche Sweet as The Wife
- Adele DeGarde as The Child
- Joseph Graybill as The False Friend
- Kate Bruce

== See also ==
- D. W. Griffith filmography
- Blanche Sweet filmography
