= Two Men of the Desert =

1913 film

- Directed by: D. W. Griffith
- Written by: D. W. Griffith; Stanner E.V. Taylor
- Based on: A story by Jack London
- Starring: Blanche Sweet
- Cinematography: G. W. Bitzer
- Production company: American Mutoscope and Biograph Company
- Distributed by: General Film Company
- Release date: August 23, 1913 (U.S.)
- Running time: 17 minutes
- Country: United States
- Language: Silent (English intertitles)

Two Men of the Desert (also known as Two Men on the Desert and Two Men in a Desert) is a 1913 American short silent Western film written and directed by D. W. Griffith. Based on a story by Jack London, the film was shot on location in Death Valley. Two Men of the Desert is now presumed lost.

== Cast ==
- Blanche Sweet as the authoress
- Henry B. Walthall as first partner
- Walter Miller as second partner
- Alfred Paget as an Indian
- Jennie Lee as old Indian woman
- Harry Carey
- Donald Crisp
- Charles Hill Mailes
- Mae Marsh
- Marshall Neilan
