= The Sporting Venus =

1925 film

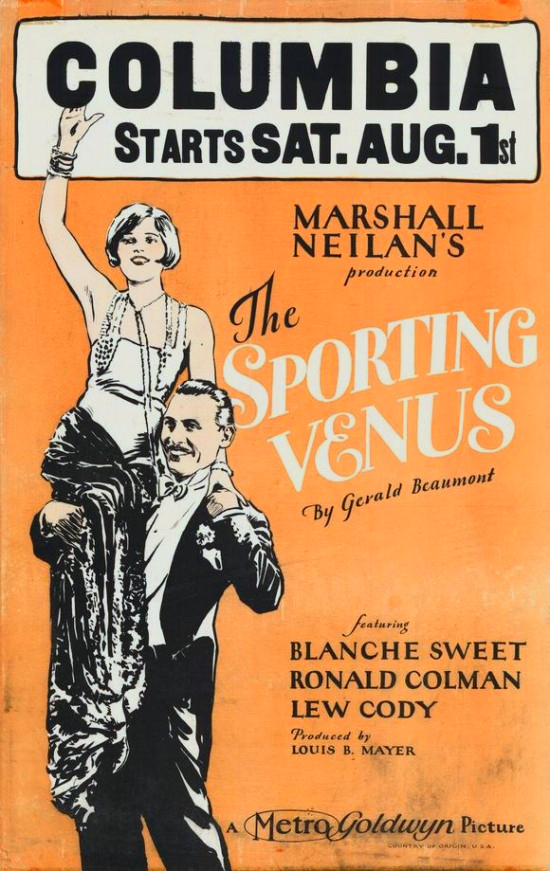
- 1925 theatrical poster
- Directed by: Marshall Neilan
- Screenplay by: Thomas J. Geraghty
- Story by: Gerald Beaumont
- Starring: Blanche Sweet; Ronald Colman; Lew Cody
- Cinematography: David Kesson
- Edited by: Blanche Sewell
- Distributed by: Metro-Goldwyn
- Release date: April 13, 1925
- Running time: 6 reels (5,938 feet)
- Country: United States
- Language: Silent (English intertitles)

The Sporting Venus is a 1925 American silent romantic drama film directed by Marshall Neilan. The film was the second MGM release of Neilan, and starred his wife, actress Blanche Sweet, who allegedly sported the lowest waistline of 1925. This is the first of two feature films that paired Ronald Colman with Blanche Sweet, the second being His Supreme Moment, which was released in May 1925.

== Plot ==
The Sporting Venus (1925)

As described in a film magazine review, Scotch heiress Lady Gwendolyn is in love with a commoner, medical student Donald MacAllan, but the match is disapproved by her father. A misunderstanding develops and she has romance with the continental Prince Carlos, a nobleman who pretends to be wealthy. In an attempt to forget her unhappiness, she seeks diversion in famous watering places and other climes. Eventually she learns the true character of the nobleman and affects a reconciliation with Donald.

== Cast ==
- Blanche Sweet as Lady Gwendolyn
- Ronald Colman as Donald MacAllan
- Lew Cody as Prince Carlos
- Josephine Crowell as Countess Van Alstyne
- Edward Martindel as Sir Alfred Grayle
- Kate Price as Housekeeper
- Hank Mann as Carlos' Valet
- Arthur Hoyt as Detective
- George Fawcett as Father

== Reception ==
Life Magazine wrote "The Sporting Venus is typical of Neilan at his worst and at his best. It is foolish, inconsequential and spineless, and yet it is entertaining. ... If you look for rhyme or reason in The Sporting Venus, you will look in vain."

== Preservation ==
A complete copy of the film survives in MGM's archives.

== See also ==
- Blanche Sweet filmography
