= A Decree of Destiny =

1911 film directed by D. W. Griffith

- Directed by: D. W. Griffith
- Written by: Virginia K. Tucker
- Starring: Mary Pickford
- Cinematography: G. W. Bitzer
- Distributed by: Biograph Company
- Release date: March 6, 1911
- Running time: 17 minutes
- Country: United States
- Language: Silent (English intertitles)

A Decree of Destiny is a 1911 American short silent romantic drama film directed by D. W. Griffith, starring Mary Pickford and featuring Blanche Sweet. Two prints of this film exist in the Library of Congress film archive.

== Cast ==
- Joseph Graybill as Kenneth Marsden
- Marion Sunshine as Edith
- Mary Pickford as Mary
- Clara T. Bracy as The Aunt
- Claire McDowell as A Nun
- Donald Crisp as At the Club/At the Wedding
- Mack Sennett
- Blanche Sweet
- Kate Toncray as At the Wedding

== See also ==
- List of American films of 1911
