= The New Dress (film) =

1911 film directed by D. W. Griffith

- Directed by: D. W. Griffith
- Written by: Grace Henderson
- Starring: Wilfred Lucas
- Cinematography: G. W. Bitzer
- Distributed by: Biograph Company
- Release date: May 15, 1911
- Running time: 17 minutes
- Country: United States
- Language: Silent (English intertitles)

The New Dress is a 1911 American short silent drama film directed by D. W. Griffith, starring Wilfred Lucas and featuring Blanche Sweet.

== Cast ==
- Wilfred Lucas as Jose
- Dorothy West as Marta
- W. Chrystie Miller as The Father
- Vivian Prescott as The Painted Woman
- Mack Sennett
- Blanche Sweet as At Wedding / At Market
- Kate Toncray as At Wedding / At Market
- Charles West as At Wedding / At Cafe (as Charles H. West)

== See also ==
- D. W. Griffith filmography
- Blanche Sweet filmography
