= The Two Paths (1911 film) =

1911 film directed by D. W. Griffith

- Directed by: D. W. Griffith
- Starring: Dorothy Bernard
- Cinematography: G. W. Bitzer
- Distributed by: Biograph Company
- Release date: January 2, 1911
- Running time: 17 minutes
- Country: United States
- Language: Silent (English intertitles)

The Two Paths is a 1911 American short silent drama film directed by D. W. Griffith, starring Dorothy Bernard and featuring Blanche Sweet. A print of the film survives in the film archive of the Museum of Modern Art.

== Cast ==
- Dorothy Bernard as Florence
- Wilfred Lucas as Nellie's Husband
- Adolph Lestina as Temptor
- Clara T. Bracy as Mother
- Donald Crisp as Footman
- Blanche Sweet
- Harry Solter
