= The Italian Barber =

1911 film directed by D. W. Griffith

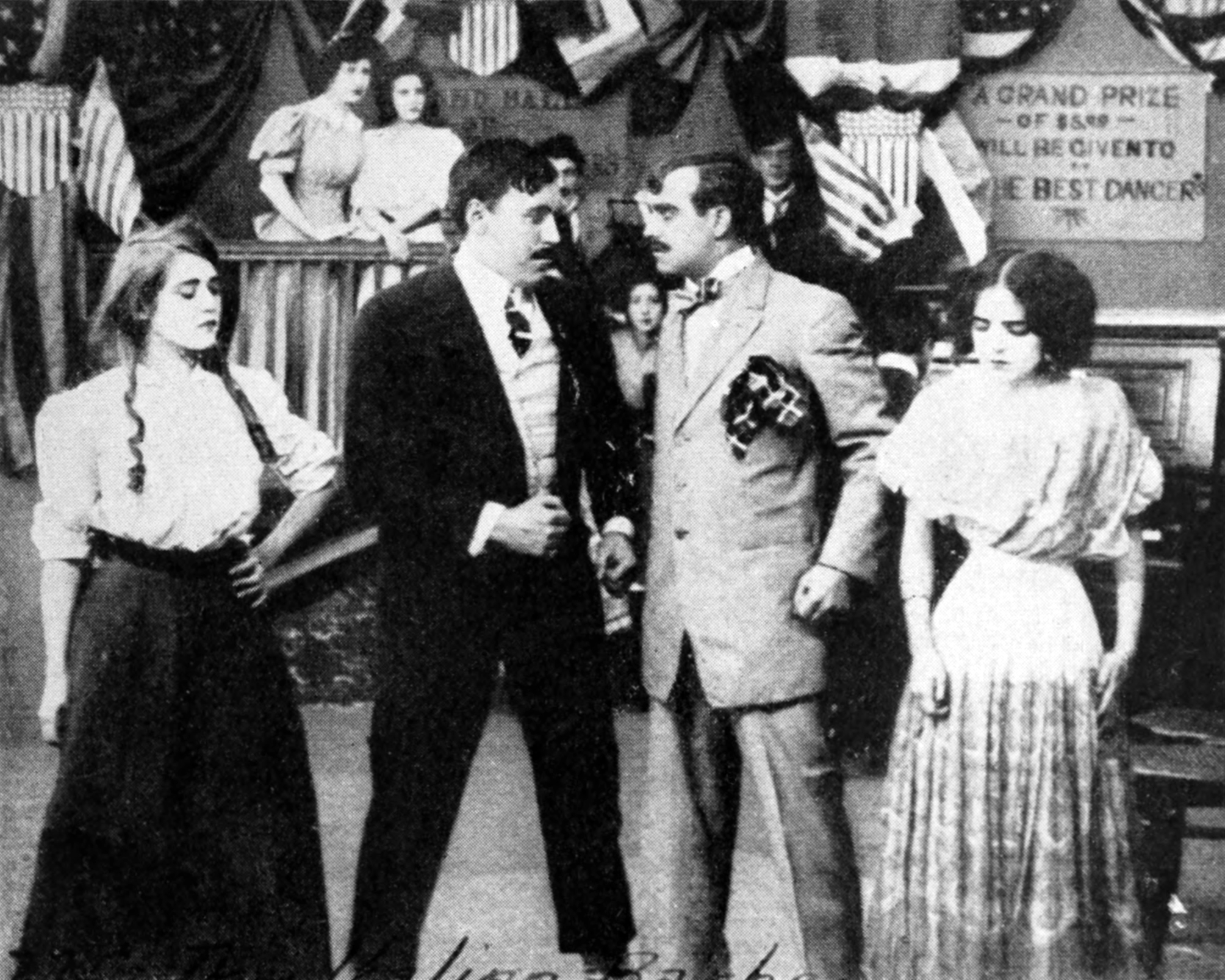
- Mary Pickford, Mack Sennett, Joseph Graybill, and Marion Sunshine in the Barbers' Ball scene
- Directed by: D. W. Griffith
- Starring: Joseph Graybill
- Cinematography: G. W. Bitzer
- Production company: Biograph Company
- Distributed by: General Film Company
- Release date: January 9, 1911
- Running time: 17 minutes
- Country: United States
- Language: Silent (English intertitles)

The Italian Barber is a 1911 silent, romantic drama short film directed by D. W. Griffith, starring Joseph Graybill and Mary Pickford. It was produced by the Biograph Company.

== Plot ==
Tony is attracted to Alice, who mans a sidewalk newsstand. He buys a flower and gives it to her before entering the nearby barber shop where he works. He cannot take his mind off the girl and neglects his client, who eventually loses his patience and leaves half shaved.

Tony escorts Alice home, where he meets her mother. While the latter is out of the room, he proposes to Alice, placing a ring on her finger, as well as a necklace around her neck.

Alice's sister Florence returns home from touring with her vaudeville song-and-dance partner Bobby Mack, and Alice introduces her to her fiancé. However, Tony finds Florence more attractive than Alice. He lets Florence know; after her initial hesitancy, they embrace. Alice unexpectedly comes home looking for something, and finds them in each other's arms. She gives Tony back his ring.

Tony takes Florence to the Barbers' Ball; he invites Alice to go with them, but she declines. After they leave, Alice places a pistol to her head, but fortunately Mack's surprise appearance makes her shot go astray, narrowly missing Mack too. Mack shows his romantic interest in Alice. He takes her to the ball, and both couples are pleased with the new arrangement.

== Cast ==
- Joseph Graybill as Tony
- Mary Pickford as Alice
- Marion Sunshine as Florence
- Mack Sennett as Bobby Mack
- Kate Bruce as Mother
- Robert Harron as man buying papers
- John T. Dillon as man buying papers
- W. C. Robinson as in shop
- Donald Crisp as at ball
- Adolph Lestina
- Vivian Prescott
- Edward Dillon
- Jeanie MacPherson
- Lottie Pickford
- Claire McDowell

== Production ==
The film was shot in November 1910 at Fort Lee, New Jersey, when many early film studios in America's first motion picture industry were based there at the beginning of the 20th century. It reused the storefront employed in The Musketeers of Pig Alley.

== Preservation status ==
Prints are held by the Library of Congress and the Museum of Modern Art.

== See also ==
- D. W. Griffith filmography
- Mary Pickford filmography
