= Donald Crisp =

English actor (1882–1974)

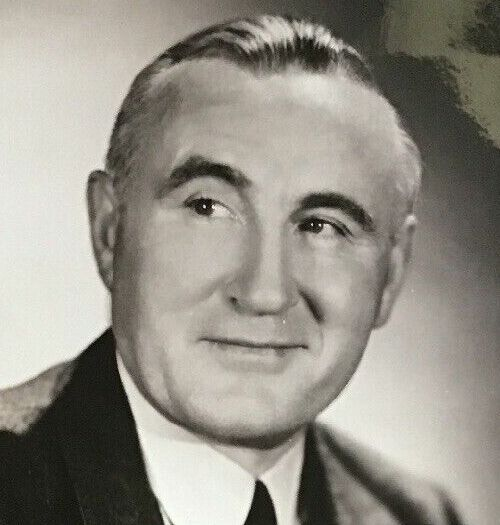
- Donald Crisp in 1937
- Born: George William Crisp; 27 July 1882; Bow, London, England
- Died: 25 May 1974 (aged 91); Van Nuys, Los Angeles, California, U.S.
- Occupations: Actor; producer; director; screenwriter
- Years active: 1908–1963
- Political party: Republican
- Spouses: Helen Pease (m. 1912; died 1913); Marie Stark (m. 1917; div. 1920); Jane Murfin (m. 1932; div. 1944)

Donald William Crisp (27 July 1882 – 25 May 1974) was an English film character actor as well as an early producer, director and screenwriter. His career lasted from the early silent film era into the 1960s. He won an Academy Award for Best Supporting Actor in 1942 for his performance in How Green Was My Valley.

== Early life ==
Donald Crisp was born George William Crisp at 3 Clay Hall Road, Bow, London, on 27 July 1882. He was the youngest of ten children (four boys and six girls) born to Elizabeth (née Christy) and James Crisp, a labourer. He was educated locally and in 1901 was living with his parents and working as a driver of a horse-drawn vehicle.

Crisp made a number of claims about his early life that were eventually proven false decades after his death. He claimed that he was born in 1880 in Aberfeldy in Perthshire, Scotland, and even went so far as to maintain a Scottish accent throughout his life in Hollywood. In fact, he had no connections to Scotland, but in 1996, a plaque commemorating him was unveiled by Scottish comedian Jimmy Logan in Crisp's supposed hometown of Aberfeldy. He claimed on alternative occasions that his father was a cattle farmer, a country doctor or a royal physician to King Edward VII. He also claimed that he was educated at Eton and Oxford, and that he served as a trooper in the 10th Hussars in the Boer War.

== Early career ==
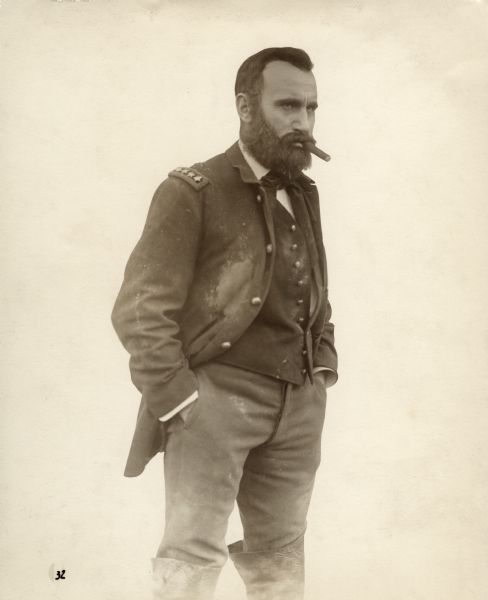
Still of Crisp in a US Army uniform for his role as General Ulysses S. Grant in D. W. Griffith's silent drama The Birth of a Nation (1915)

While travelling on the SS Carmania to the United States in July 1906, Crisp's singing talents during a ship's concert caught the attention of opera impresario John C. Fisher, who immediately offered him a job with his company. Crisp spent his first year in New York City in the Grand Opera, and the following year as a stage director. It was while touring with the company in the United States and Cuba that Crisp first became interested in the theatre. By 1910, Crisp, then using the name Donald (he retained George as a middle name), was working as a stage manager for the renowned entertainer, composer, playwright and director George M. Cohan. It was during this time that he met and befriended film director D.W. Griffith. When Griffith ventured west to seek his fortune in Hollywood in 1912, Crisp accompanied him.

From 1908 to 1930, Crisp, in addition to directing dozens of films, also appeared in nearly 100 silent films, though many in bit or small parts. One notable exception was his casting by Griffith as General Ulysses S. Grant in Griffith's landmark film The Birth of a Nation in 1915. Another was his role in Griffith's 1919 film Broken Blossoms as "Battling Burrows", the brutal and abusive father of the film's heroine, Lucy Burrows (played by Lillian Gish, who was only 11 years his junior).

== Director ==
Crisp worked as an assistant to Griffith for several years and learned much during this time from Griffith, an early master of film storytelling who was influential in advancing a number of early techniques, such as cross cutting in editing his films. This experience fostered a similar passion in Crisp to become a director in his own right. His first directing credit was Little Country Mouse, made in 1914. Many directors (and actors) would find themselves turning out a dozen or more films in a single year at this time. Over the next fifteen years, Crisp directed some 70 films in all, most notably The Navigator (1924) with Buster Keaton and Don Q, Son of Zorro (1925) with Douglas Fairbanks.

When asked later by an interviewer why he eventually gave up directing and returned full-time to acting, Crisp commented that directing had become extremely wearisome because he was so often called upon, if not forced, to do favours for studio chiefs by agreeing to employ their relatives in his films. His final directorial effort was the film The Runaway Bride (1930).

== Military career ==
Between working for Griffith and other producers, along with his many acting roles, Crisp managed to return to the U.K., serving in British army intelligence during the First World War (1914–1918). Crisp became an American citizen in 1930; during the Second World War (1939–1945), he served in the United States Army Reserve, attaining the rank of colonel.

== Return to acting ==
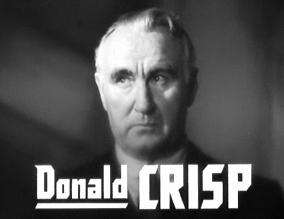
From trailer for Shining Victory (1941)

With the advent of "talkies", Crisp abandoned directing and devoted himself entirely to acting after 1930. He became a much sought-after character actor. Throughout the 1930s and 1940s, he appeared in a wide range of roles alongside some of the era's biggest stars, including Katharine Hepburn in The Little Minister (1934) and A Woman Rebels (1936), Charles Laughton and Clark Gable in Mutiny on the Bounty (1935), Bette Davis and Henry Fonda in That Certain Woman (1937) and Jezebel (1938), Laurence Olivier in Wuthering Heights (1939), Errol Flynn in The Charge of the Light Brigade (1936), The Private Lives of Elizabeth and Essex (1939), and The Sea Hawk (1940) and Gregory Peck in The Valley of Decision (1945).

A versatile supporting actor, Crisp played in lovable or sinister roles. During the same period he was playing father figures or old codgers in classic films like National Velvet and Lassie Come Home, he also turned in a well-received performance as Commander Beach, the tormented presumptive grandfather in Lewis Allen's The Uninvited (1944). Crisp's most notable role was as the taciturn but loving father in How Green Was My Valley (1941) directed by John Ford. The film received ten Oscar nominations, winning five, including Best Picture, with Crisp winning the Oscar for Best Supporting Actor in 1942.

== Hollywood power broker ==
Crisp was an active liaison between the film industry and outside business interests. His experience in business, the military and entertainment, including being a production and studio executive, lent itself to this task. He became an adviser for Bank of America, which was one of the leading sources of working capital for the film industry for many years (an industry which relied heavily on loans). Crisp served on the bank's advisory board for several decades, including a stint as its chairman. Many of the films eventually financed by the bank during the 1930s and 1940s got their highest approval from Crisp.

Crisp eventually became one of the more wealthy members of the film industry. His "banker's sobriety", extensive contacts and clarity of thought allowed him to make good investments, particularly in the real estate market. He continued to appear in films throughout the 1950s and into the early 1960s. During more than half a century as an actor, he appeared in as many as 400 two-reel and feature-length productions, perhaps a great deal more. John Carradine, who counted over 500 films to his own credit (the Internet Movie Database records over 300), told his son Keith, who repeated the story during a 2018 Gilbert Gottfried podcast, that only Donald Crisp had appeared in more movies. Crisp's final screen role was as Grandpa Spencer alongside former film co-stars Henry Fonda and Maureen O'Hara in the 1963 film Spencer's Mountain. This film, adapted from the novel by Earl Hamner, Jr., was the basis for the 1970s television series The Waltons.

Crisp was in his eighties by the time he quit acting entirely, continuing to work long after it was financially necessary simply because he enjoyed it.

== Personal life ==
Crisp was married three times. In 1912, he married actress Helen Pease, and they remained together until her death the following year. In 1917, he married Marie Stark, whom he divorced in 1920; she went on to act in silent films as Marie Crisp. In 1932, he married film screenwriter Jane Murfin, whom he divorced in 1944.

== Death ==
Crisp died in 1974, a few months short of his 92nd birthday, due to complications from a series of strokes. In addition to being one of the premier character actors of his era, he left behind an extensive list of contributions to the film industry he worked to promote for more than fifty years. He is buried at Forest Lawn Memorial Park Cemetery in Glendale, California.

He was a staunch Republican who campaigned for Thomas Dewey in 1944.

== Legacy ==
On 8 February 1960, Crisp received a star on the Hollywood Walk of Fame for his contributions to the motion pictures industry at 1628 Vine Street.

== Partial filmography ==
=== As actor ===
- The French Maid (1908, Short)
- Through the Breakers (1909, Short) as At the Club
- Sunshine Sue (1910, Short) as Head of Sweatshop
- A Plain Song (1910, Short) as at station
- A Child's Stratagem (1910, Short) as policeman
- The Golden Supper (1910, Short) as courtier (uncredited)
- Winning Back His Love (1910, Short) as at stage door
- The Two Paths (1911, Short) as footman
- Heart Beats of Long Ago (1911, Short) as courtier
- What Shall We Do with Our Old? (1911, Short) as bailiff
- The Lily of the Tenements (1911, Short)
- A Decree of Destiny (1911, Short) as at the club / at the wedding
- The White Rose of the Wilds (1911, Short)
- Her Awakening (1911, Short) as accident witness
- The Primal Call (1911, Short)
- Out from the Shadow (1911, Short) at a dance
- The Making of a Man (1911, Short) as actor / backstage
- The Long Road (1911, Short) as a servant / the landlord
- The Battle (1911, Short) as a Union soldier
- The Miser's Heart (1911, Short) as a policeman
- The Italian Barber (1911, Short) as at ball
- Help Wanted (1911, Short) as in corridor
- Fate's Turning (1911, Short) as a valet
- The Poor Sick Men (1911, Short) as policeman
- A Wreath of Orange Blossoms (1911, Short) as servant
- Conscience (1911, Short) as policeman
- In the Days of '49 (1911, Short)
- The Diving Girl (1911, Short) as a bather
- Swords and Hearts (1911, Short) as bushwacker
- The Squaw's Love (1911, Short) as Indian
- The Adventures of Billy (1911, Short) as first tramp
- The Failure (1911, Short) as employer
- The Eternal Mother (1912, Short) as in-field
- The Musketeers of Pig Alley (1912, Short) as rival gang member
- The Inner Circle (1912, Short)
- Pirate Gold (1913, Short)
- Near to Earth (1913, Short)
- The Sheriff's Baby (1913, Short)
- Olaf—An Atom (1913, Short) as the beggar
- The Mothering Heart (1913, Short) (unconfirmed)
- Two Men of the Desert (1913, Short)
- Black and White (1913, Short)
- The Battle of the Sexes (1914) as Frank Andrews
- The Great Leap; Until Death Do Us Part (1914)
- Home, Sweet Home (1914) as the mother's son
- The Escape (1914) as "Bull" McGee
- The Folly of Anne (1914, Short)
- The Sisters (1914, Short)
- The Mysterious Shot (1914, Short) as Buck
- The Stiletto (1914, Short) as Angelino
- The Mountain Rat (1914, Short) as Steve
- Ashes of the Past (1914, Short)
- The Different Man (1914, Short) as ranch farmer
- The Miniature Portrait (1914, Short)
- The Soul of Honor (1914, Short)
- The Newer Woman (1914, Short)
- Their First Acquaintance (1914, Short)
- The Birthday Present (1914, Short) as the burglar
- The Weaker Strain (1914, Short)
- The Avenging Conscience (1914) as Minor Role (uncredited)
- The Idiot (1914, Short)
- The Tavern of Tragedy (1914, Short) as spy, Bob Jameson
- Her Mother's Necklace (1914, Short) as the burglar
- A Lesson in Mechanics (1914, Short)
- Down the Hill to Creditville (1914, Short)
- The Great God Fear (1914, Short) as Dick Stull
- His Mother's Trust (1914, Short) as Dr. Keene
- The Warning (1914, Short) as Mr. Edwards
- Another Chance (1914, Short) as The Tramp
- A Question of Courage (1914, Short)
- Over the Ledge (1914, Short)
- An Old Fashioned Girl (1915, Short)
- The Birth of a Nation (1915) as Gen. Ulysses S. Grant
- The Love Route (1915) as Harry Marshall
- The Commanding Officer (1915) as Col. Archer
- May Blossom (1915) as Steve Harland
- The Foundling (1915) (scenes cut)
- A Girl of Yesterday (1915) as A. H. Monroe
- Ramona (1916) as Jim Farrar
- Intolerance (1916) as Extra (uncredited)
- Joan the Woman (1916)
- Broken Blossoms (1919) as Battling Burrows
- The Bonnie Brier Bush (1921; also directed) as Lachlan Campbell
- Don Q, Son of Zorro (1925) as Don Sebastian
- The Black Pirate (1926) as MacTavish
- Stand and Deliver (1928) as London Club Member (uncredited)
- The River Pirate (1928) as Caxton
- The Viking (1928) as Leif Ericsson
- Trent's Last Case (1929) as Sigsbee Manderson
- The Pagan (1929) as Mr. Roger Slater
- The Return of Sherlock Holmes (1929) as Colonel Moran
- Scotland Yard (1930) as Charles Fox
- Svengali (1931) as The Laird
- Kick In (1931) as Police Commissioner Harvey
- A Passport to Hell (1932) as Sgt. Snyder
- Red Dust (1932) as Guidon, overseer
- Broadway Bad (1933) as Darrall
- The Crime Doctor (1934) as D.A. Mr. Anthony
- The Key (1934) as Peadar Conlan
- The Life of Vergie Winters (1934) as Mike Davey
- British Agent (1934) as Marshall O'Reilly (scenes cut)
- What Every Woman Knows (1934) as David Wylie
- The Little Minister (1934) as Doctor McQueen
- Vanessa: Her Love Story (1935) as George, the Inn Keeper
- Laddie (1935) as Mr. Pryor
- Oil for the Lamps of China (1935) as J.T. McCarter
- Mutiny on the Bounty (1935) as Burkitt
- The White Angel (1936) as Doctor Hunt
- Mary of Scotland (1936) as Huntly
- The Charge of the Light Brigade (1936) as Col. Campbell
- A Woman Rebels (1936) as Judge Byron Thisthlewaite
- Beloved Enemy (1936) as Liam Burke
- The Great O'Malley (1937) as Captain Cromwell
- Parnell (1937) as Davitt
- The Life of Emile Zola (1937) as Maitre Labori
- Confession (1937) as Presiding Judge
- That Certain Woman (1937) as Jack Merrick, Sr.
- Sergeant Murphy (1938) as Col. Todd Carruthers
- Jezebel (1938) as Dr. Livingstone
- The Beloved Brat (1938) as John Morgan
- The Amazing Dr. Clitterhouse (1938) as Police Inspector Lewis Lane
- Valley of the Giants (1938) as Andy Stone
- The Sisters (1938) as Tim Hazelton
- Comet Over Broadway (1938) as Joe Grant
- The Dawn Patrol (1938) as Phipps
- The Oklahoma Kid (1939) as Judge Hardwick
- Wuthering Heights (1939) as Dr. Kenneth
- Juarez (1939) as General Marechal Achille Bazaine
- Sons of Liberty (1939, Short) as Alexander MacDongall
- Daughters Courageous (1939) as Samuel 'Sam' Sloane
- The Old Maid (1939) as Dr. Lanshell
- The Private Lives of Elizabeth and Essex (1939) as Francis Bacon
- Dr. Ehrlich's Magic Bullet (1940) as Minister Althoff
- Brother Orchid (1940) as Brother Superior
- The Sea Hawk (1940) as Sir John Burleson
- City for Conquest (1940) as Scotty MacPherson
- Knute Rockne, All American (1940) as Father John Callahan
- Shining Victory (1941) as Dr. Drewitt
- Dr. Jekyll and Mr. Hyde (1941) as Sir Charles Emery
- How Green Was My Valley (1941) as Gwilym Morgan
- The Gay Sisters (1942) as Ralph Pedloch
- Forever and a Day (1943) as Capt. Martin
- Lassie Come Home (1943) as Sam Carraclouch
- The Uninvited (1944) as Commander Beech
- The Adventures of Mark Twain (1944) as J.B. Pond
- National Velvet (1944) as Mr. Herbert Brown
- Son of Lassie (1945) as Sam Carraclouch
- The Valley of Decision (1945) as William Scott
- Ramrod (1947) as Jim Crew
- Hills of Home (1948) as Drumsheugh
- Whispering Smith (1948) as Barney Rebstock
- Challenge to Lassie (1949) as John "Jock" Gray
- Bright Leaf (1950) as Mayor James Singleton
- Home Town Story (1951) as John MacFarland
- Prince Valiant (1954) as King Aguar
- The Long Gray Line (1955) as Old Martin
- The Man from Laramie (1955) as Alec Waggoman
- Drango (1957) as Judge Allen
- Saddle the Wind (1958) as Dennis Deneen
- The Last Hurrah (1958) as Cardinal Martin Burke
- A Dog of Flanders (1959) as Jehan Daas
- Pollyanna (1960) as Mayor Karl Warren
- Greyfriars Bobby: The True Story of a Dog (1961) as James Brown
- Spencer's Mountain (1963) as Grandpa Zubulon Spencer (final film role)

=== As a director ===
- Her Father's Silent Partner (1914, Short)
- Ramona (1916)
- Rimrock Jones (1918)
- Believe Me, Xantippe (1918)
- The Goat (1918)
- Johnny Get Your Gun (1919)
- Love Insurance (1919)
- Why Smith Left Home (1919)
- It Pays to Advertise (1919)
- Too Much Johnson (1919)
- The Six Best Cellars (1920)
- Miss Hobbs (1920)
- Held by the Enemy (1920)
- Appearances (1921)
- The Princess of New York (1921)
- The Bonnie Brier Bush (1921; also acted)
- Tell Your Children (1922)
- The Navigator (1924) (co-directed with Buster Keaton)
- Ponjola (1924) (co-directed with James Young)
- Don Q, Son of Zorro (1925; also acted)
- Young April (1926)
- Dress Parade (1927)
- Nobody's Widow (1927)
- The Cop (1928)
- The Runaway Bride (1930)

== See also ==
- List of Academy Award winners and nominees from Great Britain
- List of actors with Academy Award nominations
