= The Long Road (film) =

1911 film directed by D. W. Griffith

- Directed by: D. W. Griffith
- Written by: Bernardine R. Leist
- Starring: Blanche Sweet
- Cinematography: G. W. Bitzer
- Distributed by: Biograph Company
- Release date: October 26, 1911
- Running time: 17 minutes
- Country: United States
- Language: Silent (English intertitles)

The Long Road is a 1911 American short silent drama film directed by D. W. Griffith and starring Blanche Sweet.

== Cast ==
- Blanche Sweet as Edith
- Grace Henderson as Edith's Mother
- Charles West as Ned
- Claire McDowell as Ned's Wife
- Edna Foster as Ned's Son
- Kate Bruce as Mother Superior
- Edwin August as At Party
- William J. Butler as At Party
- Donald Crisp as A Servant / The Landlord
