= Enoch Arden (1911 film) =

1911 film directed by D. W. Griffith

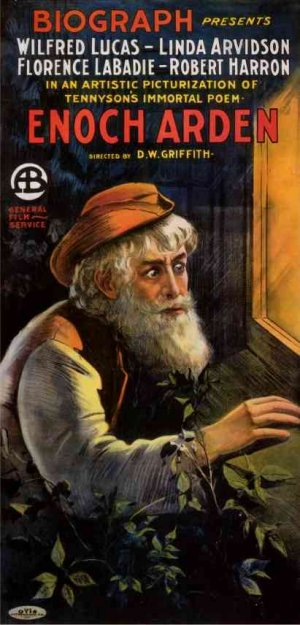
- Theatrical poster for Enoch Arden
- Directed by: D. W. Griffith
- Written by: Linda Arvidson
- Based on: the poem Enoch Arden by Alfred, Lord Tennyson
- Starring: Wilfred Lucas; Linda Arvidson
- Cinematography: G. W. Bitzer
- Distributed by: Biograph Company
- Release dates: June 12, 1911 (Part I); June 15, 1911 (Part II)
- Running time: 33 minutes (combining parts I and II)
- Country: United States
- Language: Silent (English intertitles)

Enoch Arden is a two-part 1911 short silent drama film from the United States, based on the 1864 Tennyson poem of the same name. It was directed by D. W. Griffith, and starred Wilfred Lucas and Linda Arvidson. Part I was released on June 12, 1911, and Part II three days later.

A print of the film survives in the film archive of the Library of Congress. Prints, positive or negative, are also held by the Museum of Modern Art, the George Eastman Museum, the National Film and Television Archive and the UCLA Film and Television Archive.

== Plot ==
Enoch Arden and Philip Ray are rivals for the affections of Annie Lee. Annie marries Enoch.

Later, with three small children to support, Enoch is offered the opportunity to "recoup his fortunes" on a sea voyage. Annie gives her husband a locket containing a curl of their baby. Enoch's ship founders in a tropical storm. Only Enoch and two other crewmen make it to shore, where they are marooned. Eventually only Enoch remains alive.

Meanwhile, Annie never gives up hope of Enoch's return, and rejects Philip's proposal. The years pass, and two of Annie and Enoch's children become young adults. Philip persists, and finally, at the urging of her children, Annie marries him.

Enoch is rescued and returns home. Finding his old place empty, he goes to the inn, where he overhears a gossip and learns what has happened to Annie. He peeks in the window of Philip's house and sees the owner with his and Annie's baby in his arms. Enoch decides not to reveal himself. He returns to the inn and dies. The gossip sees the locket and realizes who he is. She prays.

Enoch Arden (1911)

== Cast ==
- Wilfred Lucas as Enoch Arden
- Linda Arvidson as Annie Lee
- Francis J. Grandon as Philip Ray
- George Nichols as the captain
- Edward Dillon as a rescuer
- Joseph Graybill as a shipwrecked, later dead sailor
- Grace Henderson as the gossip
- Florence Lee on the beach
- Jeanie MacPherson as a servant
- Alfred Paget as a shipwrecked sailor / on the beach
- Blanche Sweet on the beach
- Robert Harron as teenage Arden son
- Florence La Badie as teenage Arden daughter
- William J. Butler in bar
- Guy Hedlund on rescue ship
- Dell Henderson as a rescuer
- Henry Lehrman on rescue ship
- W. C. Robinson as a rescuer
- Charles West in bar (credited as Charles H. West)

== See also ==
- List of American films of 1911
