= Blanche Sweet =

American actress (1896–1986)

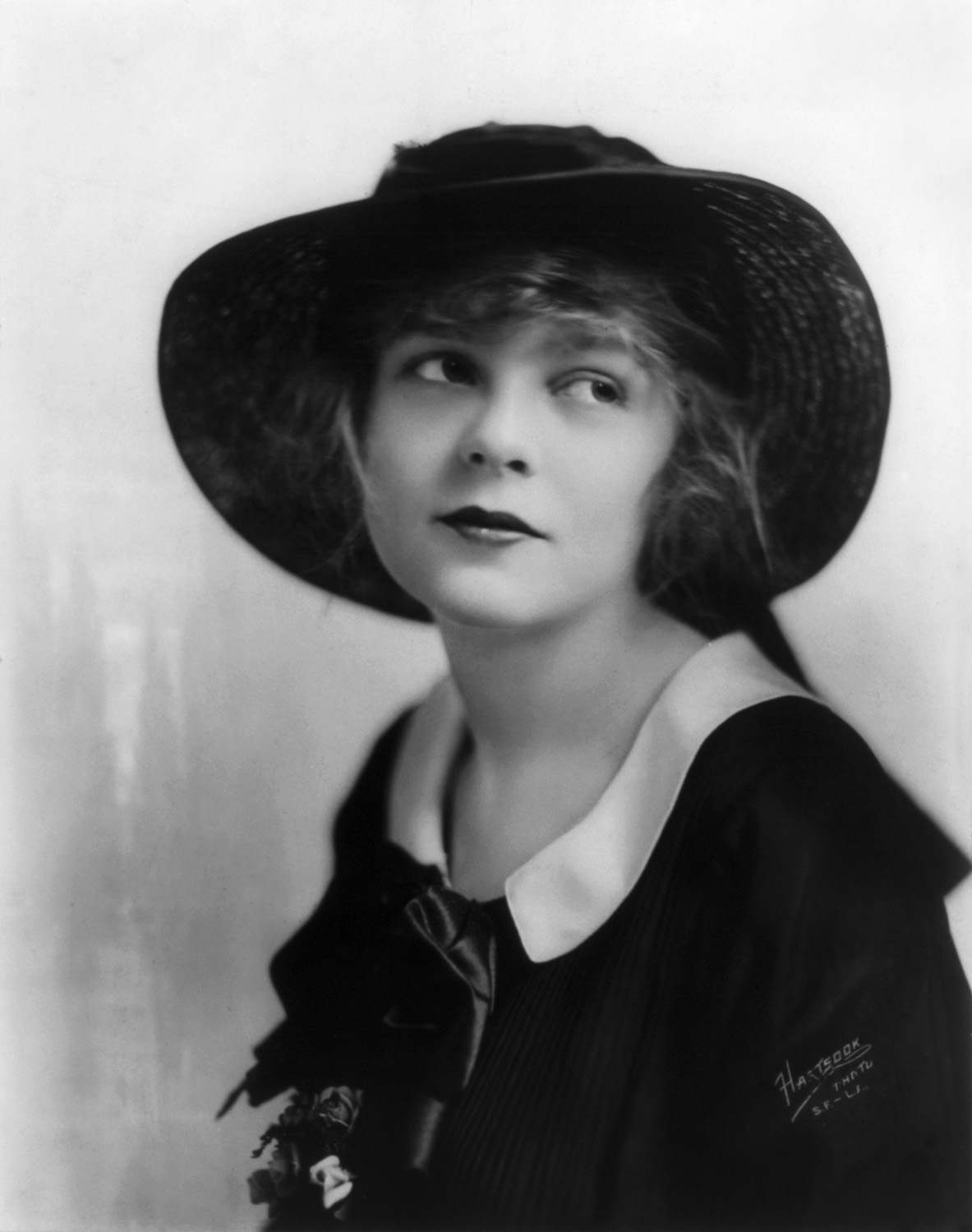
- Sweet, c. 1915
- Born: Sarah Blanche Sweet; June 18, 1896; Chicago, Illinois, U.S.
- Died: September 6, 1986 (aged 90); New York City, U.S.
- Other names: Sarah Blanche Alexander; Blanche Alexander; Daphne Wayne; Blanche Hackett
- Occupation: Actress
- Years active: 1909–1930, 1958–1960
- Notable work: Full list
- Spouses: Marshall Neilan (m. 1922; div. 1929); Raymond Hackett (m. 1935; died 1958)

Sarah Blanche Sweet (June 18, 1896 – September 6, 1986) was an American silent film actress who began her career in the early days of the motion picture film industry. Throughout her career, Sweet appeared in 121 silent films and three sound films.

== Early life ==
Born Sarah Blanche Sweet (though her first name Sarah was rarely used) in Chicago, Illinois in 1896, she was the daughter of Clara Pearl Alexander (b. 1878, d. 1898), a dancer and singer, and Gilbert Joel Sweet (b. 1857, d. 1922). The couple married sometime between 1894 and 1896 in Chicago.

Gilbert Sweet is often described as a wine merchant, (Note: Also known as Charles Sweet.) although he held various jobs in various cities, including a paint salesman in San Francisco and a porcelain works manager in New York City.

The actors Antrim and Gertrude Short were Sweet's cousins. (Note: The Shorts were the grandchildren of the sister of Cora Alexander, making them second cousins.)

Sweet's mother died at age 20 while touring in Newark, New Jersey. Sweet was an infant at the time, and she was raised by her maternal grandmother, Cora Blanche Lamb (b.1849, d. 1937); Lamb went by her married name, Cora Blanche Alexander. Cora Alexander found her many parts as a young child. At age 4, she toured in the play The Battle of the Strong with Marie Burroughs and Maurice Barrymore.

A decade later, Sweet acted with Barrymore's son Lionel in a D. W. Griffith-directed film. In 1909, she started work at Biograph Studios under contract to director D. W. Griffith. By 1910, she had become a rival to Mary Pickford, who had started for Griffith the previous year.

== Career ==
=== Rise to fame ===
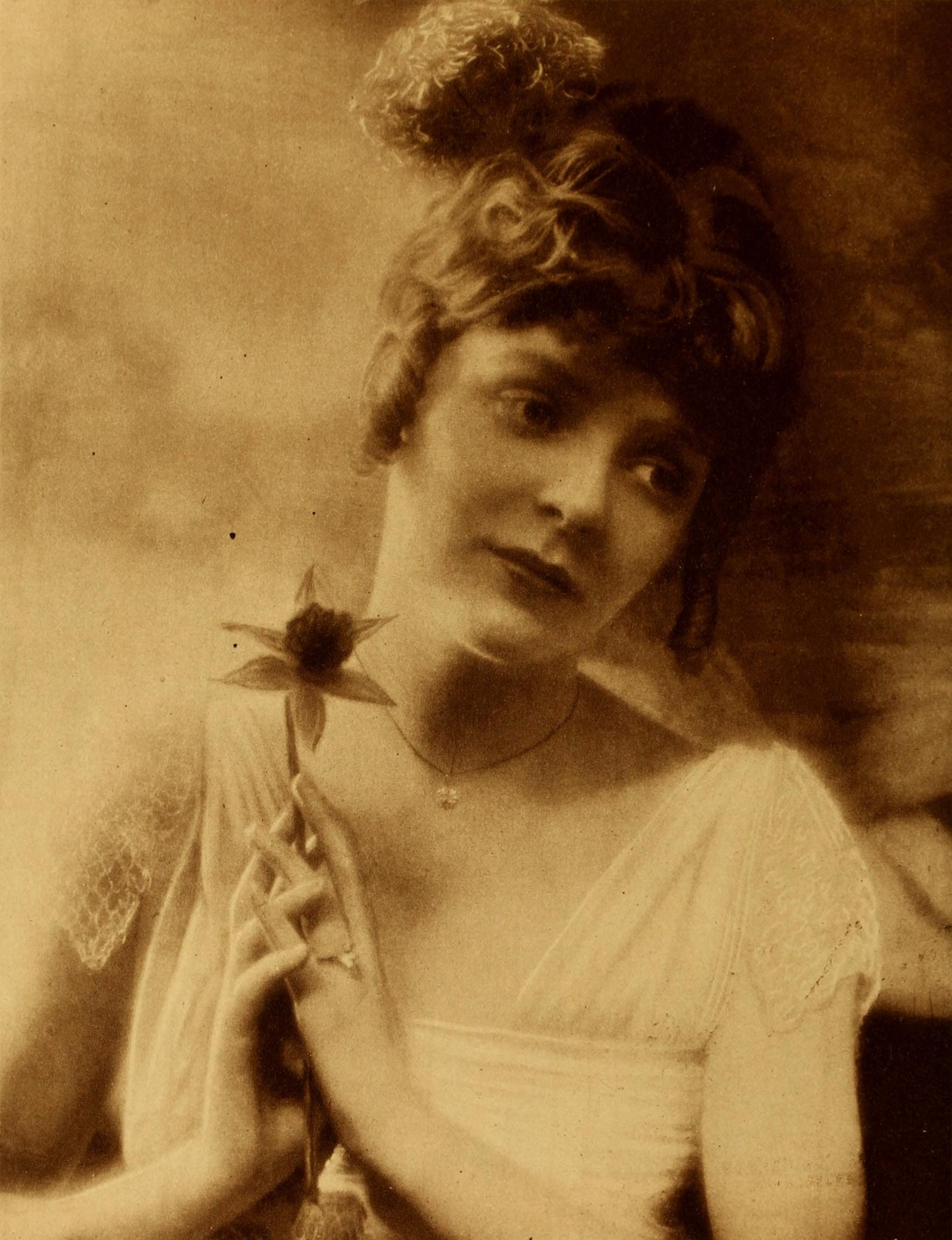
Sweet, seen in an official January 1918 Photoplay publicity photo

After many starring roles, her landmark film was the 1911 D. W. Griffith thriller The Lonedale Operator. In 1913, she starred in Judith of Bethulia, Griffith's first feature film, which made her an instant star. In 1914, Sweet was considered by Griffith for the part of Elsie Stoneman in his epic The Birth of a Nation (1915), but the role went to Lillian Gish. The same year, Sweet parted ways with Griffith and joined Paramount (then Famous Players–Lasky) for the much higher pay that studio was able to afford.

Because the Biograph company refused to reveal the names of its actors, the British distributor M. P. Sales billed Sweet as Daphne Wayne.

Throughout the 1910s, Sweet continued her career appearing in a number of highly prominent roles in films and remained a publicly popular leading lady. She often starred in vehicles by Cecil B. DeMille and Marshall Neilan, and she was recognized by leading film critics of the time to be one of the foremost actresses of the entire silent era.

During the early 1920s, Sweet's career continued to prosper, and she starred in the first film version of Anna Christie in 1923. The film is notable as being the first Eugene O'Neill play to be made into a motion picture. Of Sweet's performance, The New York Times wrote: "It would be difficult to imagine any actress doing better in this exacting role."

In successive years, she starred in Tess of the d'Urbervilles and The Sporting Venus, both directed by Neilan. Sweet soon began a career phase as one of the newly-formed MGM's biggest stars.

=== Retirement and other ventures ===
Sweet's career faltered with the advent of sound films. Sweet made just three talking pictures, including her critically lauded performance in Showgirl in Hollywood (1930). Her last film was The Silver Horde (1930), after which she retired. Throughout the 1950s, Sweet worked in a New York department store as a clerk, though she made a brief appearance in The Five Pennies (1959).

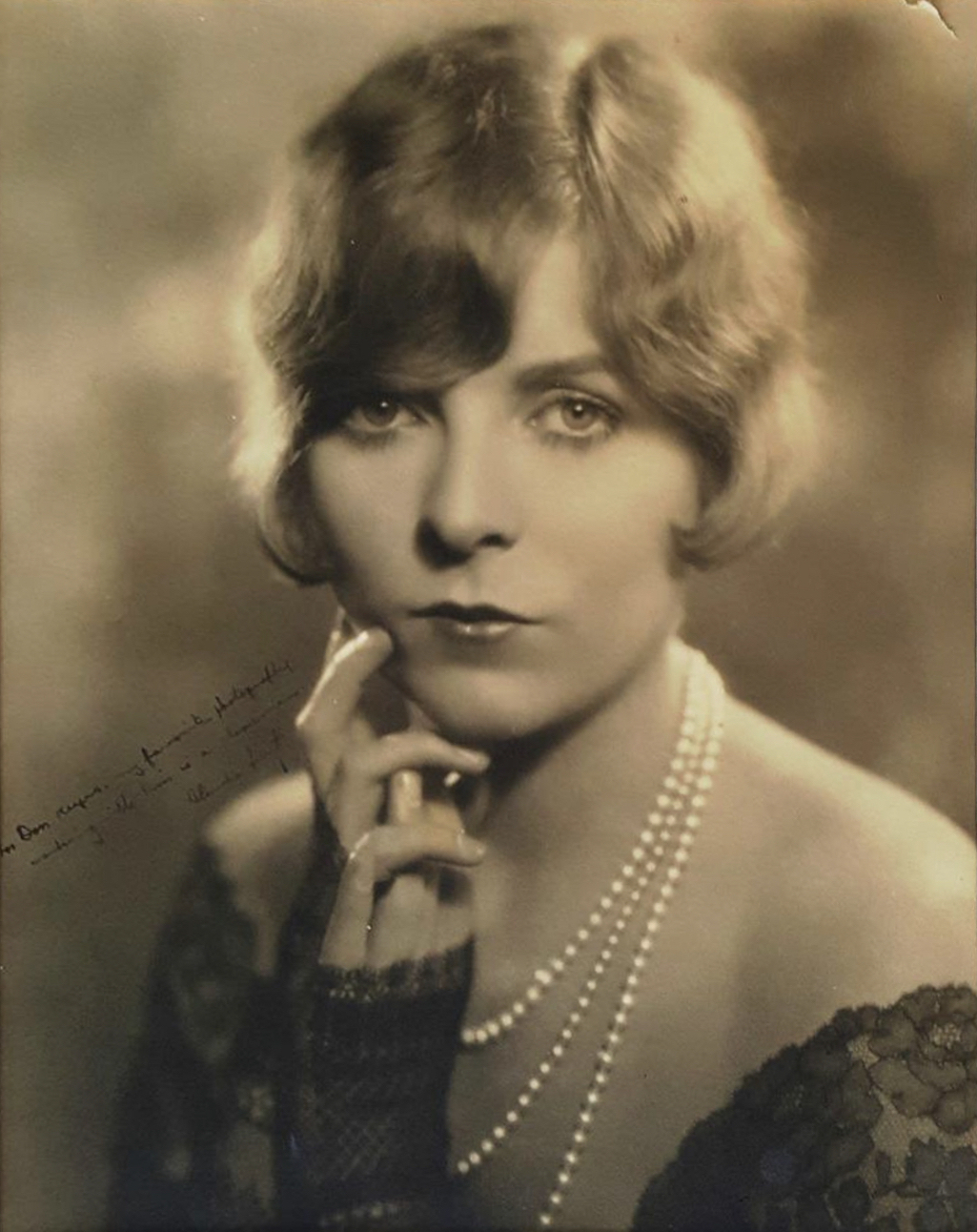
Sweet c. 1928

Sweet spent the remainder of her performing career in radio and in secondary stage roles on Broadway, such as in The Party's Over and The Petrified Forest, the latter with Humphrey Bogart and Leslie Howard. Eventually, her career in both of these fields faded, and she began working in a department store in Los Angeles. In the late 1960s, her acting legacy was resurrected when film scholars invited her to Europe to receive recognition for her work.

In 1975, she was honored with the George Eastman Award for distinguished contribution to the art of film.

She appeared as herself in the 1978 30-minute documentary film Portrait of Blanche Sweet, directed by Anthony Slide.

In 1980, Sweet was one of the many featured surviving silent film stars interviewed at length in Kevin Brownlow's documentary Hollywood. Two years later, she appeared in Before the Nickelodeon, a film documenting the early days of Hollywood.

On September 24, 1984, a tribute to Sweet was held at the Museum of Modern Art in New York City. Sweet introduced her 1925 film The Sporting Venus.

== Personal life ==
While working with Neilan, the two began a publicized affair, which brought on his divorce from former actress Gertrude Bambrick. Sweet and Neilan married in 1922. The union ended in 1929 with Sweet's charging that Neilan was a persistent adulterer.

In 1935, following her retirement, Sweet married stage actor Raymond Hackett. They were married until his death in 1958.

Sweet died of a stroke in New York City on September 6, 1986. A private funeral was held, and her ashes were later scattered within the Brooklyn Botanic Gardens. She was survived by her brother-in-law, Albert Hackett.

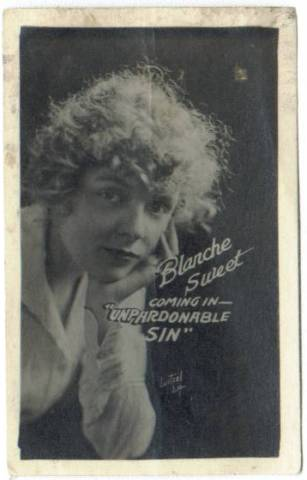
Sweet, seen in 1919 "Unpardonable Sin"

== Legacy ==
Sweet was known for her energetic, independent roles, at variance with the 'ideal' Griffith type of vulnerable, often fragile, femininity. Film writer Anthony Slide says that she had "a curious career replete with highlights, falls from favor and inexplicable absences from the screen." In his book Griffith and the Rise of Hollywood, film historian Paul O'Dell wrote, "Sweet is one of the most underrated of screen actresses; it is highly probable that had she not left D. W. Griffith she would have been given the role of Elsie Stoneman in ''The Birth of a Nation'' (1915)."

== Awards ==
Year	Organization	Category	Result	Ref.
1960	Hollywood Walk of Fame	Star	Honored	
1975	George Eastman Museum	George Eastman Award	Honored	

== Sources ==
- O'Dell, Paul (1970). Griffith and the Rise of Hollywood (1970 ed.). New York: A. S. Barnes & Co. p. 163. ISBN 0-498-07718-7.
