= The Drums of Jeopardy =

The Drums of Jeopardy may refer to:

- The Drums of Jeopardy (novel), a 1920 American novel by Harold MacGrath
- The Drums of Jeopardy (1923 film), a 1923 American film directed by Edward Dillon
- The Drums of Jeopardy (1931 film), a 1931 American film directed by George B. Seitz
