= For His Son =

1912 film by D. W. Griffith

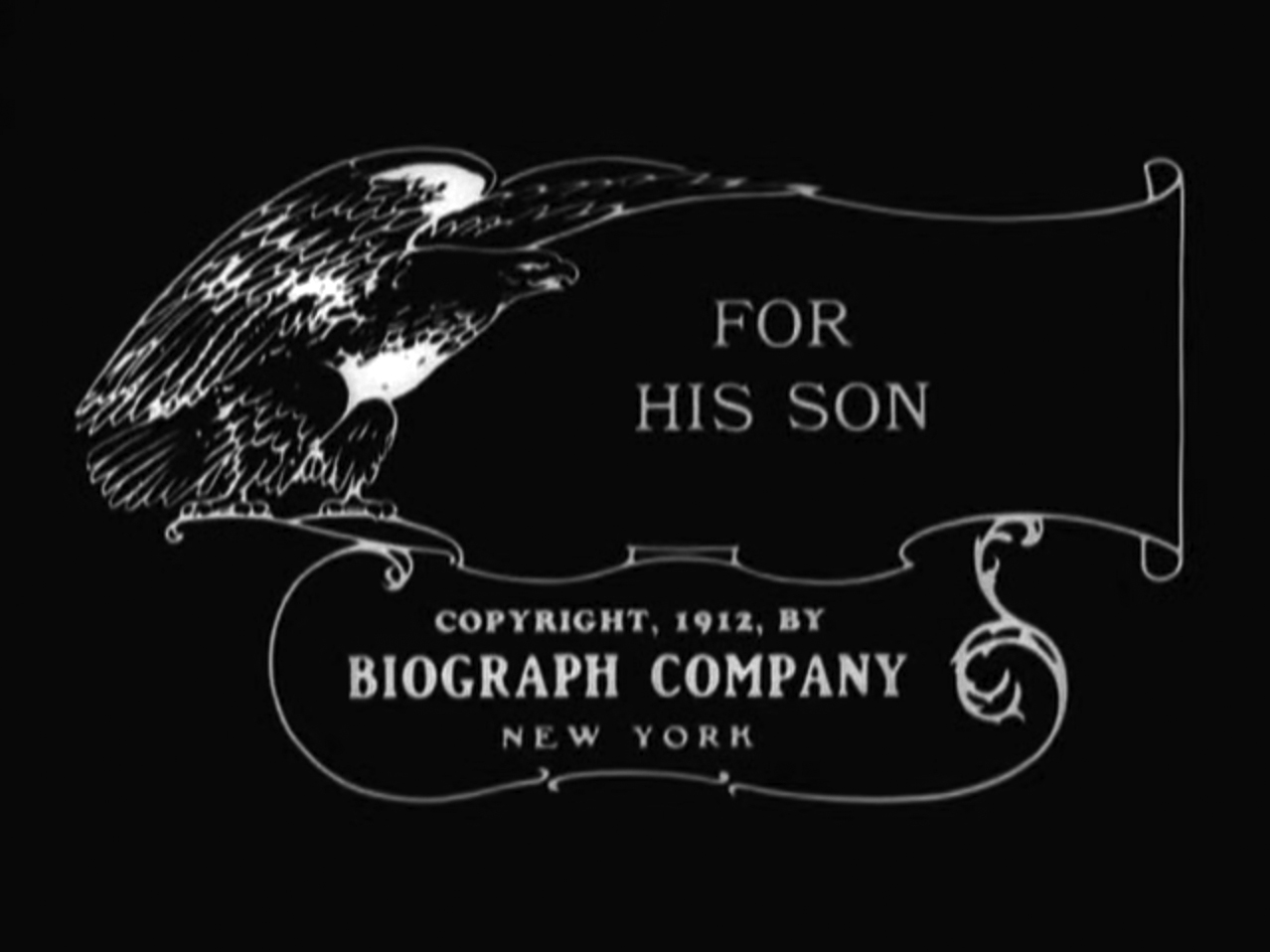
- Title card
- Directed by: D. W. Griffith
- Written by: Emmett C. Hall
- Starring: Charles Hill Mailes; Charles West; Blanche Sweet
- Cinematography: G. W. Bitzer
- Distributed by: Biograph Company
- Release date: January 22, 1912
- Running time: 15 minutes
- Country: United States
- Language: Silent (English intertitles)

For His Son is a 1912 American short silent drama film directed by D. W. Griffith and starring Charles Hill Mailes, Charles West and Blanche Sweet. A young man becomes addicted to the secret ingredient in the soft drink invented by his father. Mark Griep claims the film was inspired by the Pure Food and Drug Act of 1906, the original formulation of Coca-Cola—which contained cocaine—and Vin Mariani, and notes that the book Silent Films, 1877–1996: A Critical Guide to 646 Movies calls For His Son one of the earliest films to address drug addiction.

The film was shot in Fort Lee, New Jersey when Biograph Company and other early film studios in America's first motion picture industry were based there at the beginning of the 20th century. A print of the film survives.

Full movie

== Plot ==
A physician spoils his only son, but eventually reaches a point where he can no longer afford to give his son anymore. The doctor devises a soft drink that contains cocaine which he calls "Dopokoke" to try to raise more funds. The drink is an immediate hit, and he is able to give his son more cash.

The son becomes one of those addicted to the drink. When he learns what the secret ingredient is, he is unconcerned, as is his greedy father. When his fiancée discovers he is injecting cocaine directly with a needle, she breaks off their engagement. His father's secretary is also addicted, and she also knows what she is hooked on; they decide to elope.

The couple visibly deteriorate physically. When she refuses to share the drug with him, the son grabs her, but then dies. The physician is called, but nothing can save his son.

== Cast ==
- Charles Hill Mailes as The Father, a Physician
- Charles West as The Son
- Blanche Sweet as The Son's Fiancée
- William Bechtel in office
- Dorothy Bernard as The Secretary
- W. Christy Cabanne as One of the Son's Friends / at soda fountain
- Edward Dillon at soda fountain
- Edna Foster at soda fountain
- Robert Harron at soda fountain
- Dell Henderson in office
- Grace Henderson as The Landlady
- Harry Hyde as One of the Son's Friends
- J. Jiquel Lanoe at soda fountain
- Alfred Paget in office
- Gus Pixley at soda fountain
- W. C. Robinson at soda fountain
- Ynez Seabury at soda fountain (as Inez Seabury)
- Kate Toncray at soda fountain

== See also ==
- List of American films of 1912
- D. W. Griffith filmography
- Blanche Sweet filmography
