= Baker Stock Company =

Theater group in Portland, Oregon, United States

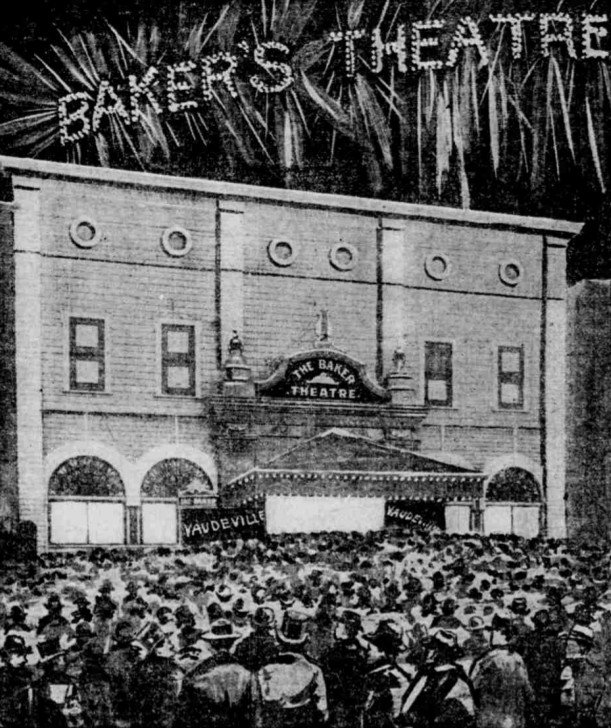
Advertisement promoting opening of the Baker Theatre in The Oregonian, February 1902

The Baker Stock Company was a theater group based in Portland, Oregon, United States, active from 1901 through 1923. The company was established by businessman George Luis Baker, who served as its manager from 1901 to 1915. The group performed mainly in Portland with performances also in Seattle, Spokane and Los Angeles.

== History ==
The Baker Stock Company was founded by businessman George Luis Baker in 1901. Its anchor theater, the Baker Theatre, opened in 1902. This location, later known as the Playhouse Theatre, among other names, became a vaudeville house and eventually a cinema; the Baker Stock Company anchor theatre relocated several times during its existence.

Historian Gordon B. Dodds notes that the Baker Stock Company was "among the best in the nation" of its kind, and produced theatrical productions for several weeks of each year. Dodds further notes:

"The appeal was to middle-class professional persons and white-collar workers: housewives attended the Wednesday matinees, family groups the weekend performances, and older couples the evening plays. Baker's customers were those whose taste ran between the vaudeville that appealed to the working classes and the touring productions of the East with the latest plays and stars, who often did not work very hard for the provincial audiences."

Among the company's notable actors included local child performers Mayo Methot and Rhea Mitchell; Josephine Dillon; Herbert Heyes, and John Gilbert, who performed with the company as a guitarist.

After the company's dissolution in 1923, it was announced by George Baker in the spring of 1926 that a merger was planned with the Forrest Taylor Stock Company, as well as the erecting of a new theater on Portland's west side for an estimated $400,000. With this new facility, the company planned to provide theatrical productions throughout the year. The merger, however, never came to fruition.

== Productions ==
The Backer Stock Company was primarily designed for family audiences. The Wednesday matinee was open to children of all ages. Teenage girls were the primary audience of the company. Full families attendance happened on Saturday night and other evening performances.

== Notable players ==
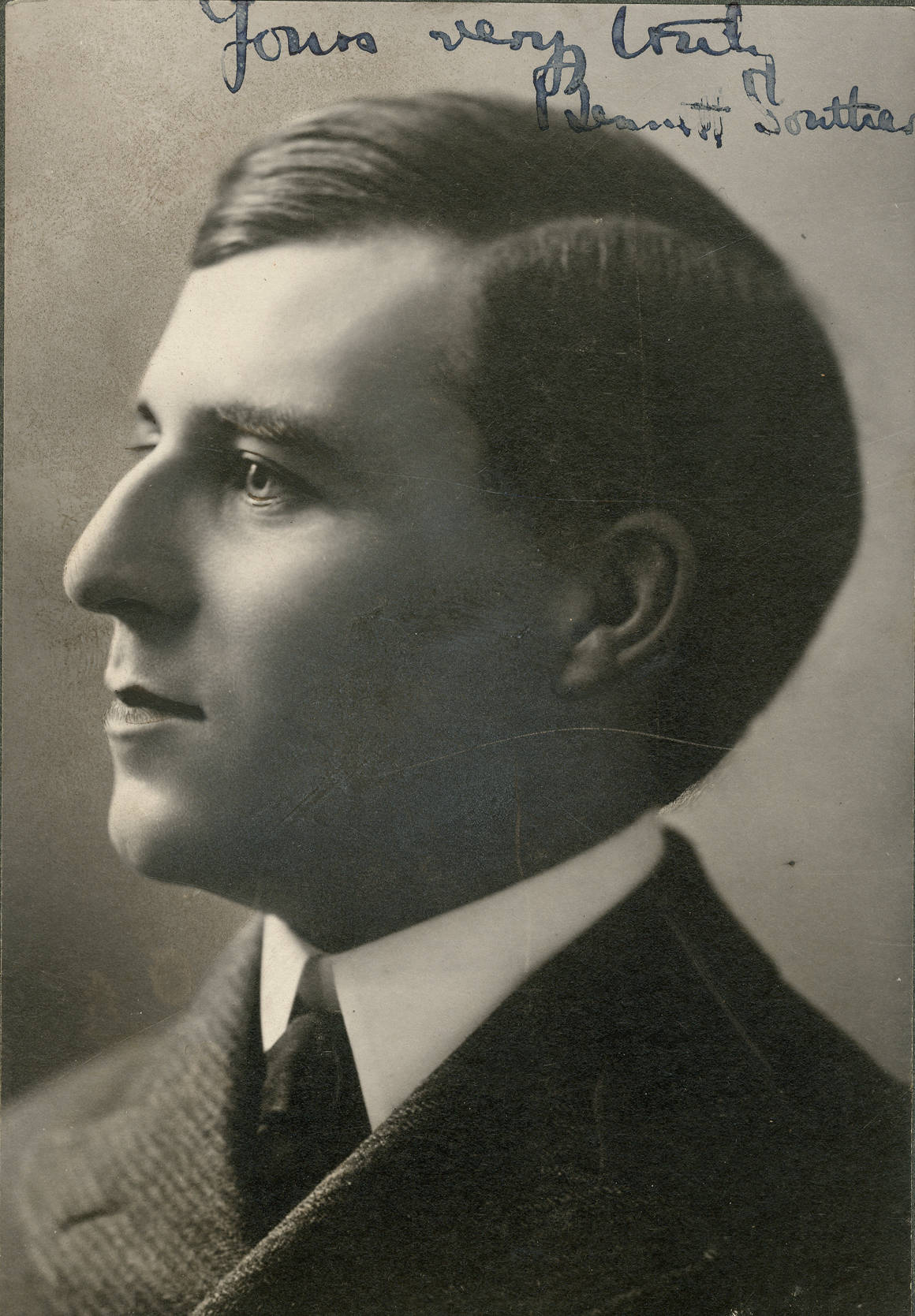
Bennett Southard, stock actor with Baker Theater Company.

- Winifred Bryson
- Josephine Dillon
- Verna Felton
- John Gilbert
- Herbert Heyes
- Edward Horton
- Selmer Jackson
- Izetta Jewel
- Mayo Methot
- Rhea Mitchell
- Broderick O'Farrell
- Jule Power
- Forrest Seabury
- Ynez Seabury
