= Ynez Seabury =

American actress (1907–1973)

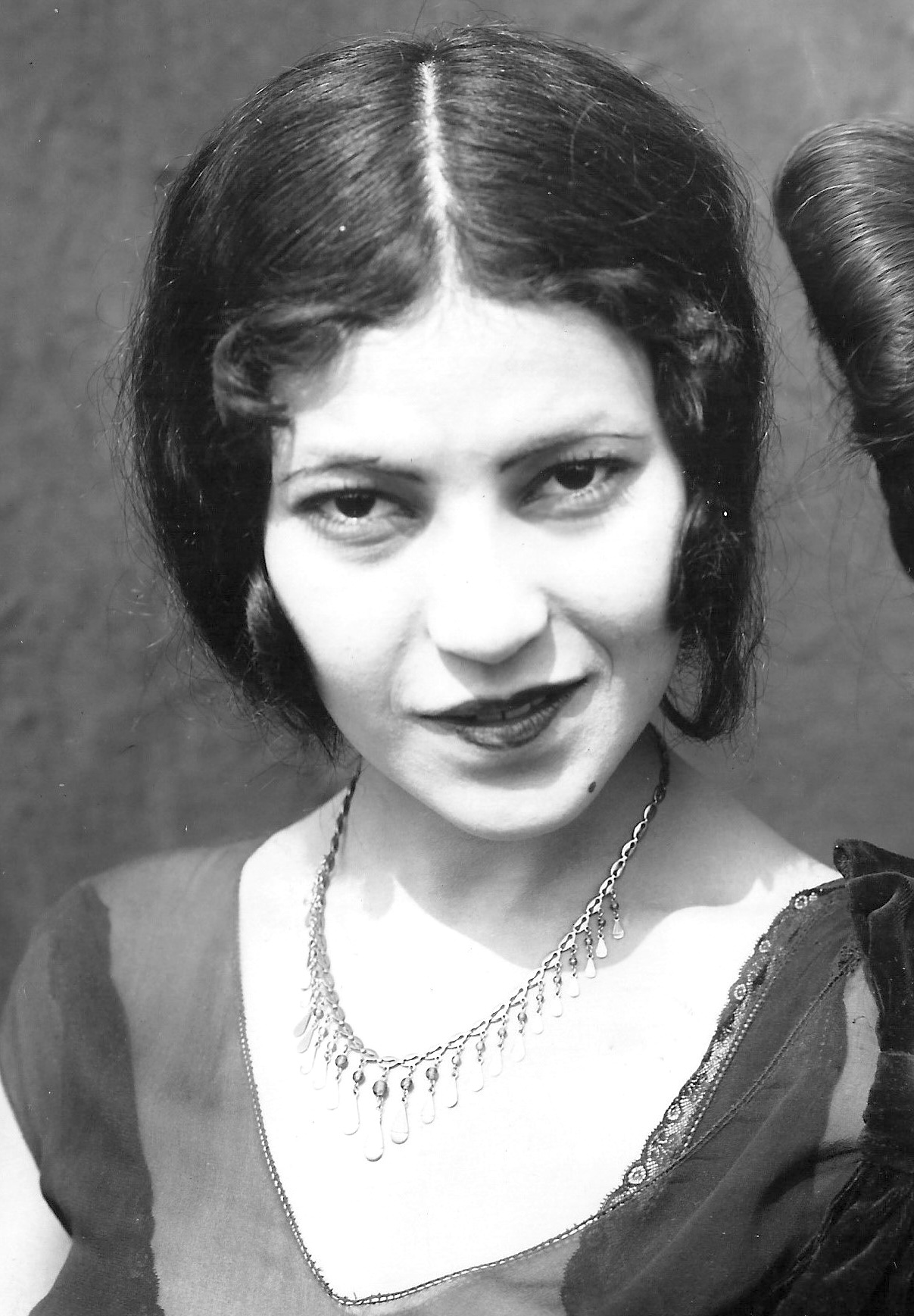
- Seabury in 1928
- Born: June 26, 1907; Portland, Oregon, U.S.
- Died: April 11, 1973 (aged 65); Los Angeles, California, U.S.
- Resting place: Forest Lawn Memorial Park, Glendale, California
- Occupation: Actress
- Years active: 1911–1940
- Spouse: Walter William Costello (m. 1928; div. 1929)
- Father: Forrest Seabury
- Relatives: Samuel Seabury (great-great-grandfather)

Ynez Seabury (June 26, 1907 – April 11, 1973) was an American actress of the stage, silent and early sound film era. She began her career as a child actor, making her screen debut in D. W. Griffith's The Miser's Heart (1911). She appeared on Broadway and occasionally appear in films during the early sound era. Her last credited feature film appearance was in Cecil B. DeMille's North West Mounted Police (1940).

== Biography ==
=== Early life ===
Ynez Seabury was born June 26, 1907 in Portland, Oregon to actors Charlotte and Forrest Seabury. Her father was a prominent stage actor from Oakland, California, and a direct descendent of Samuel Seabury, while her maternal great-grandfather, Louis Mario Peralta—a founder of the city of Oakland—was sent to San Francisco from his native Spain by King Charles III.

Seabury had an itinerant childhood due to both of her parents' careers as performers. At age two, Seabury won the prize for "Prettiest Baby" at the Scranton Times's baby show in Luna Park.

=== Career ===
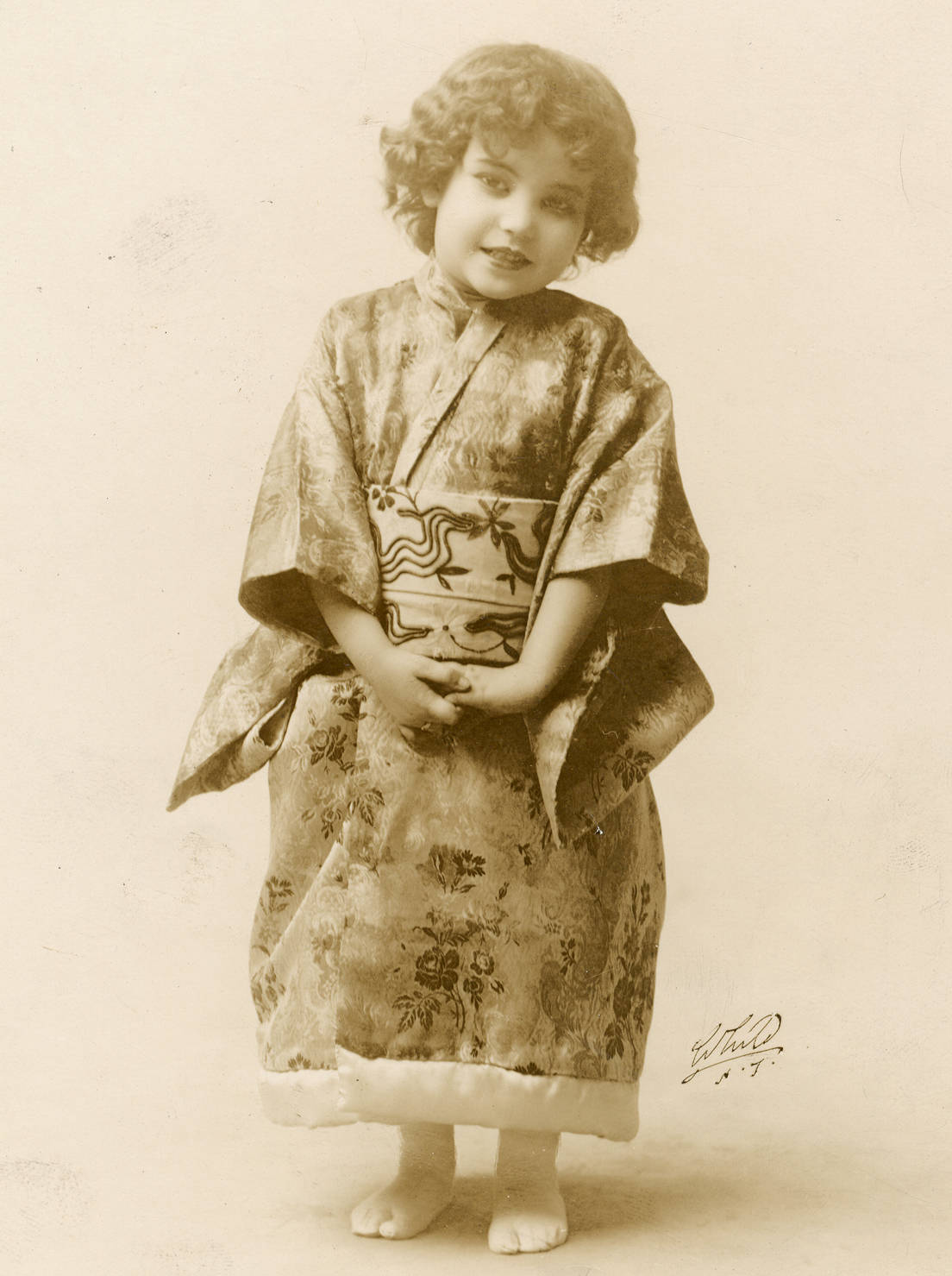

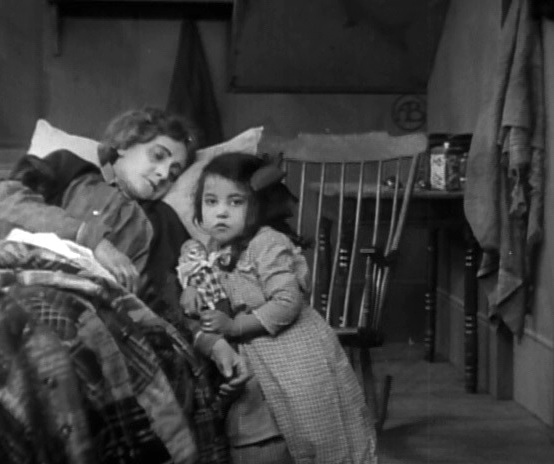
Seabury (right) with Kate Bruce in The Sunbeam (1912)

Seabury was acting in movies by the age of 4, debuting as Little Kathy in D. W. Griffith's The Miser's Heart (1911). Seabury appeared in numerous films for Griffith from 1911 to 1912, including A Woman Scorned, The Voice of the Child, Billy's Stratagem, For His Son, The Sunbeam, A String of Pearls, and The Root of Evil. In 1912, she made her debut on Broadway in Racketty-Packetty House. In June 1912, Seabury appeared opposite her father in a Portland-based stage production of Madame Butterfly for the Baker Stock Company.

Due to her darker features, Seabury was frequently cast in ethnic roles, portraying Italians and Native Americans. In 1924, she starred as a Native American woman in Red Clay (1924), a film which starred William Desmond and Albert J. Smith. The plot was constructed around an Indian's education and his subsequent social ostracism. In her role as the Indian maid Miss Seabury earned acclaim for the "very fine emotional quality" of her work.

In March 1928, she subsequently participated in His Blossom Bride, a romantic drama of the stage produced by Richard Walton Tully, premiering at the Mason opera house in Los Angeles in March 1928. The scenery and lighting for the play showed an opening prologue in the Painted Desert of Arizona and the Hopi Indian reservation. Members of the Hopi tribe were adopted by Seabury, who portrayed the Indian heroine. Seabury was revered by the Hopi because of her understanding of their lives and ambitions. Before serving as background actors in the production, twenty-nine tribesmen and their chief toured Los Angeles in Cadillacs and La Salles.

On November 3, 1928, she wed broker Walter William Costello.

In 1937, she was a member of the cast of the CBS Radio Theater dramatization of Brewster's Millions, which featured Jack Benny and Mary Livingstone.

=== Later years and death ===
Seabury died in Sherman Oaks, California on April 11, 1973. She is buried at the Forest Lawn Memorial Park cemetery in Glendale, California.

== Partial filmography ==
Year	Film	Role	Director	Notes	Ref.
1911	The Miser's Heart	Little Kathy	D. W. Griffith		
1911	A Woman Scorned	The Doctor's Child	D. W. Griffith		
1911	The Voice of the Child	The Child	D. W. Griffith		
1912	Billy's Stratagem	Billy's Sister	D. W. Griffith		
1912	For His Son	Child at Soda Fountain	D. W. Griffith		
1912	The Sunbeam	Little Sunbeam	D. W. Griffith		
1912	A String of Pearls	Italian Shoemaker's Daughter	D. W. Griffith		
1912	The Root of Evil	Granddaughter	D. W. Griffith		
1923	Slander the Woman	Indian Girl	Allen Holubar		
1923	Thundergate	Mey Wang	Joseph De Grasse		
1924	Borrowed Husbands	Uncredited	David Smith (director)		
1924	When A Girl Loves	Fania	Victor Halperin		
1925	The Calgary Stampede	Neenah	Herbert Blaché		
1925	Ship of Souls	Annette Garth	Charles Miller		
1927	Red Clay	Minnie Bear Paw	Ernst Laemmle		
1929	Dynamite	Mrs. Johnson's daughter	Cecil B. DeMille		
1930	Madam Satan	Babo	Cecil B. DeMille		
1932	The Drifter	Yvonne	William A. O'Connor		
1936	The Invisible Ray	Celeste	Lambert Hillyer		
1938	The Girl of the Golden West	Wowkle	Robert Z. Leonard		
1940	North West Mounted Police	Mrs. Shorty	Cecil B. DeMille		
