= Marjorie Mikasen =

American artist

- Born: 1959 (age 66–67)
- Known for: abstract, geometric, hard-edge acrylic painter
- Spouse: Mark Griep
- Awards: Individual Artist Fellowship Award, Nebraska Arts Council
- Elected: Nebraska Women's Caucus for Art President
- Website: www.marjoriemikasen.com

Marjorie Mikasen (born 1959) is an abstract, geometric, hard-edge acrylic painter working in Lincoln, Nebraska. She has a degree in studio arts from The University of Minnesota. She is co-author with Mark Griep of the nonfiction book Re'Action!' Chemistry in the Movies.

== Early and personal life ==
Mikasen was born in Chicago, Illinois, but grew up in Minneapolis-St. Paul, Minnesota. She is of Serbian descent. She attended The University of Minnesota, is a Phi Beta Kappa, and in 1981 received her Bachelor of Arts in Studio Arts.

Mikasen is married to Mark Griep, chemistry professor at the University of Nebraska–Lincoln.

== Artist ==
In 1986 she lived and worked as a full-time artist in Denver, Colorado. Mikasen moved in 1990 to Lincoln, Nebraska, where she is an "abstract, geometric, hard-edge acrylic painter."

She received an Individual Artist Fellowship Award from the Nebraska Arts Council in 2007. In 2013, she was awarded the Madonna Rehabilitation Hospital's Artistic Achievement Award in the Visual Arts, and one of her works was included that year in the "Nebraska Arts Council Awardees" exhibition at the University of Nebraska–Lincoln's Sheldon Museum of Art.

Her works have been exhibited in the United States, Canada, Hungary and the United Kingdom in more than 100 group exhibitions. In Nebraska, her works have been shown in solo exhibitions. Mikasen's works are in private and public collections, including the University of Minnesota's Regis Center for Art and the Museum of Modern Art (MoMA) in New York.

She was president of the Nebraska Women's Caucus for Art (NWCA) in 1997. University of Nebraska–Lincoln's Sheldon Museum of Art, University of Nebraska Medical Center, and the University of Nebraska–Lincoln campus. Her work is shown and represented by Omaha, Nebraska's Modern Arts Midtown.

Mikasen is featured in the 2010 film Swimming in Nebraska by independent filmmaker Jon Jost. It has been shown at international and national film festivals. Mikasen has said her work draws on geometric shapes that she sees in the human body and other sources. She is "interested in what it means to have an intellect, instincts, and a spirit, and how these oppositions inherent in us come into balance." Mikasen is inspired by philosophy, psychology, myth, literature and scientific theory.

== Author ==
Mikasen is the coauthor with chemist Mark Griep of the nonfiction book Re'Action!' Chemistry in the Movies, which explores the political, social, and psychological aspects of chemistry of over 140 films and gives the perspectives of a scientist and artist on the "dark and bright sides" of the portrayal of chemistry in motion pictures. She and Griep were awarded an Alfred P. Sloan Foundation grant in the area of Public Understanding of Science to research and write the book. Mikasen created a work entitled Jekyll & Hyde for the book. Its stereo pair format (see stereopsis) has two focal points, which mirrors the split Jekyll & Hyde character whose oppositional personalities.

=== Published works ===
- Mark Griep; Marjorie Mikasen (2009). Reaction!: Chemistry in the Movies. Oxford University Press. ISBN 978-0-19-532692-5.
- Mark Griep; Jon Jost; Marjorie Mikasen; William Wehrbein (2011). Swimming in Nebraska. Jon Jost.
