= Steven P. Schneider =

American poet, critic, and professor of English

Steven P. Schneider is an American poet, critic, and professor of English at the University of Texas-Pan American, where he serves as director of new programs and special projects in the College of Arts and Humanities. He is the author of three books of poetry, Borderlines: Drawing Border Lives (Wings Press), a collaborative effort with his wife, Reefka Schneider, Unexpected Guests (Blue Light Press), and Prairie Air Show (Hurakan Publications and Sandhills Press). He is the author and editor of several scholarly books, including The Contemporary Narrative Poem: Critical Crosscurrents (University of Iowa Press), a collection of ten essays from poet-critics on the contemporary American narrative poem.

== Education ==
Schneider earned a Bachelor of Arts degree in English, graduating cum laude at Syracuse University in 1973. He earned a Master of Fine Arts degree in creative writing at the University of Iowa four years later. In 1986, he earned a doctorate in English and American literature at the University of Iowa.

== Books ==
=== Poetry ===
Schneider, Steven P. and Schneider, Reefka. Borderlines: Drawing Border Lives (Fronteras: dibujando las vidas fronterizas), twenty-five poems in English and Spanish about the U.S.-Mexico border accompanied by twenty-five drawings by Reefka Schneider. Wings Press, San Antonio, Texas, March, 2010.

Borderlines is a collaborative effort between Dr. Schneider and his artist-wife, Reefka Schneider. Featuring 25 drawings in charcoal, conte crayons, and pastels, Borderlines pairs portraits of people who live and work along the U.S.-Mexico border with bilingual poems that have been inspired by the art. They have also made it into a traveling art exhibit and used the exhibit to create teaching workshops. It's been reviewed by several media, including The San Antonio Express-News, the Library Journal, and Texas Border Business. Borderlines has been a featured selection at the Texas Book Festival and the Miami Book Fair International.

Schneider, Steven P. Unexpected Guests. Collection of poems. San Francisco: Blue Light Press, 2008.

This book of poetry features a collection of poems that explores the meaning of faith, remembrance and creativity.

Schneider, Steven P. Prairie Air Show. Texas City, Texas:
Hurakan Publication, College of the Mainland, chapbook of poems, spring 2000.

=== Literary criticism ===
Ed. The Contemporary Narrative Poem: Critical Crosscurrents. Iowa City: University of Iowa Press. 2012.

Ed. Complexities of Motion: New Essays on A.R. Ammons's Long Poems. Madison: Fairleigh Dickinson University Press, 1999

A.R. Ammons and The Poetics of Widening Scope. Madison: Fairleigh Dickinson University Press, 1994.

=== Nonfiction ===
Seiderman, Arthur, and Steven P. Schneider. The Athletic Eye. New York: Hearst Books, 1983.

== Scholarly articles ==
“The New Accent in American Poetry: Tato Laviera’s “AmeRícan” in the Context of American Poetry.” In The AmeRícan Poet: Essays on the Work of Tato Laviera, edited by Stephanie Alvarez and William Luis. Centro Press, The Center for Puerto Rican Studies, Hunter College, CUNY. Forthcoming, December 2013.

“Ted Kooser.” American Writers Series, Ed. Jay Parini, New York: Scribner's, September 2009. 115–130.

“The Continuing Radiance of A.R. Ammons,” Review essay, Mississippi Quarterly, Winter 2005–2006, Spring 2006, Vol. 59, No.1, No. 2, Winter 2005–06, Spring 2006.

“Defining the Canon of New Formalist Poetry.” Poetry Matters. The Poetry Center Newsletter. West Chester University. Number 2, February 2005.

“Jewish American Poetry: Poems, Commentary, and Reflections” Shofar: An Interdisciplinary Journal of Jewish Studies - Volume 23, Number 2, Winter 2005. 127-129

“A.R. Ammons’s ‘Defense of Poetry’”: Epoch, Cornell University, Ed. Roger Gilbert, v 52, #3, 2004. 454-464.

“Gary Soto,” Encyclopedia of American Literature, Oxford University Press, 2004.

"Brad Leithauser." Volume on New Formalism, Ed. Jonathan Barron and Bruce Meyer, Dictionary of Literary Biography, 2003

“Review essay on Marjorie Agosín,” Chasqui: Revista De Literatura Latinoamericana, Volume 31, Number 1, May 2002. 104–109.

"Louis Simpson." American Writers Series, Supplement VIII, Ed. Jay Parini, New York: Scribner's, November 2001. 265–283.

"Poetry, Midrash, and Feminism." Tikkun Magazine, San Francisco, Summer 2001. 61–64.

“Contemporary Jewish-American Women’s Poetry”: Marge Piercy and Jacqueline Osherow.” Judaism. Spring 2001. 199-210.

"Prairie Reclamation Project: The Poetry of Twyla Hansen and Don Welch." A Prairie Mosaic. Ed. Susanne K. George and Steven Rothenberger. Kearney: University of Nebraska at Kearney, 2000. 152–157.

"The Long Poem as a Geological Force." Complexities of Motion: New Essays on A.R. Ammons's Long Poems. Ed. Steven P. Schneider. Madison: Fairleigh Dickinson University Press, 1999. 138–166.

“From the Wind to the Earth: An Interview with A.R. Ammons." Complexities of Motion: New Essays on A.R. Ammons's Long Poems. Ed. Steven P. Schneider. Madison: Fairleigh Dickinson University Press, 1999. 325–349.

"Spotted Horses," "Faulkner and The Lost Generation." A William Faulkner Encyclopedia. Ed. Robert Hamblin and Charles Peek. New York: Greenwood Press, 1999. 254–257, 381–382.

"The Great Plains and Prairies," "Poets to Come," "The Prairie-Grass Dividing," "Louis Simpson." Walt Whitman: An Encyclopedia. Ed. J.R. LeMaster and Donald D. Kummings. New York: Garland, 1998. 259- 260, 529, 539, 637.

"On Sifting Through A.R. Ammons's Garbage." North Carolina Literary Review 11.2 (1995): 175–182.

"Coming Home: An Interview with Rita Dove." The Iowa Review 19.3 (1989): 112–123.

"The Writing Institute: Professional Writing in a Liberal Art Context." Liberal Arts and Professional Growth: Conference Proceedings. Ed. David M. Atkinson and Janice C. Barker. Tacoma: Pacific Lutheran University, 1988.

"An Interview with Louis Simpson."The Wordsworth Circle 13. 2 (1982): 99-104.

=== Non-fiction essays and articles ===
“The U.S. / Mexico Border: Beyond Fear,” The Iowa Source, July 2010.

“Books, Art and Culture Come to Life along the Border,” Hispanic Outlook, August 11, 2008.

“Teaching Culturally Relevant Literature,” Hispanic Outlook, April 10, 2006.

“Crossing Borders with Poetry and Art,” Chronicle Review, The Chronicle of Higher Education, March 24, 2006.

“Running for the Long Haul,” View, July / August, 1991.

“Pumping Iron: Aerobic Exercise Finds a Partner,” View, September / October, 1991.

“Sephardic Seattle,” Seattle Weekly, August 23, 1989.

“Flex Your Eyes,” The Washington Post Magazine, September 18, 1983.

“What You See Is What You Hit,” The Philadelphia Inquirer Magazine, August 14, 1983.

“Swept Away,” The Philadelphia Inquirer Magazine, July 25, 1982.

== Career in education ==
=== Current position ===
In his current position as director of new programs and special projects for the College of Arts and Humanities (COAH) at the University of Texas-Pan American(UTPA), Dr. Schneider coordinates the development of new, academic, interdisciplinary programs as well as several community outreach programs. Since 2007 he has worked closely with the dean of COAH on program development for FESTIBA, the annual Festival of Books and Arts at UTPA. FESTIBA is a week-long program each spring that celebrates the Arts and Humanities. It brings to campus prominent artists, writers, musicians, and scholars for a week of performances, exhibits, readings, and lectures on a single theme.

Schneider also has developed the UTPA partnership with the Texas Book Festival (TBF) and coordinates the TBF Reading Rock Stars program in the Rio Grande Valley (RGV) during the week of FESTIBA. Since 2007 this partnership has resulted in nearly 30 children's authors and illustrators who have visited 14 public schools in the RGV and the donation of over 23,000 books to students in these schools. As an advocate of community literacy, Dr. Schneider has received two Big Read grants from the National Endowment for the Arts and is a founding member of the South Texas Literacy Coalition. He has also worked closely with several national and regional organizations, including the Texas Book Festival, Reading is Fundamental (RIF), Gear-Up, the Region One Educational Service Center, as well as the staff of Congressman Rubén Hinojosa.

He is currently a professor in the Department of English, teaching courses on contemporary American poetry, contemporary and multi-ethnic literatures, and creative writing. He has pioneered courses in “Teaching Culturally Relevant Literature,” “Textual Power,” and “Creativity through Art and Poetry.” Schneider co-founded the Masters of Fine Arts (MFA) program in creative writing at UTPA.

=== Previous positions ===
Chair and Professor (tenured), Department of English, The University of Texas-Pan American, August 2001 – June 2007.

Associate Professor (tenured), Department of English, University of Nebraska at Kearney, August 1995 – June 2001. University of Nebraska System Graduate College Faculty Fellow.

Graduate Program Director, Department of English, University of Nebraska at Kearney, Sept.1997-August 2000

Director, Campus Writing Center and Lecturer in Department of Liberal Studies, The University of Washington, Bothell, 1991–1995.

Assistant Professor, Department of English, University of Puget Sound, 1987–1990.

== Consulting and advisory boards ==
Schneider serves on several state and regional advisory boards, consults for school districts, and is a popular presenter of teacher workshops.

Academic Program Reviewer

Texas Book Festival, Austin, TX, State Advisory Board

Executive Planning Committee, FESTIBA, The University of Texas Pan-American

South Texas Literacy Coalition, Founding Member

Region One Educational Service Center

College Board

== Awards ==
The Helene Wurlitzer Foundation of New Mexico, Fellowship and Writer's Residency, Taos, New Mexico, summer 2012

NEA Big Read Grant, 2009-2010

NEA Big Read Grant, 2008-2009

Humanities Texas Grant, 2005

Humanities Texas Community Project grant, 2004

Nebraska Arts Council Fellowship in Poetry. Spring, 1997.

Anna Davidson Rosenberg Award for Poems on the Jewish Experience.

Awarded by Judah L. Magnes Museum, Berkeley, CA. October, 1994.
