= Edward Woods =

American actor (1903–1989)

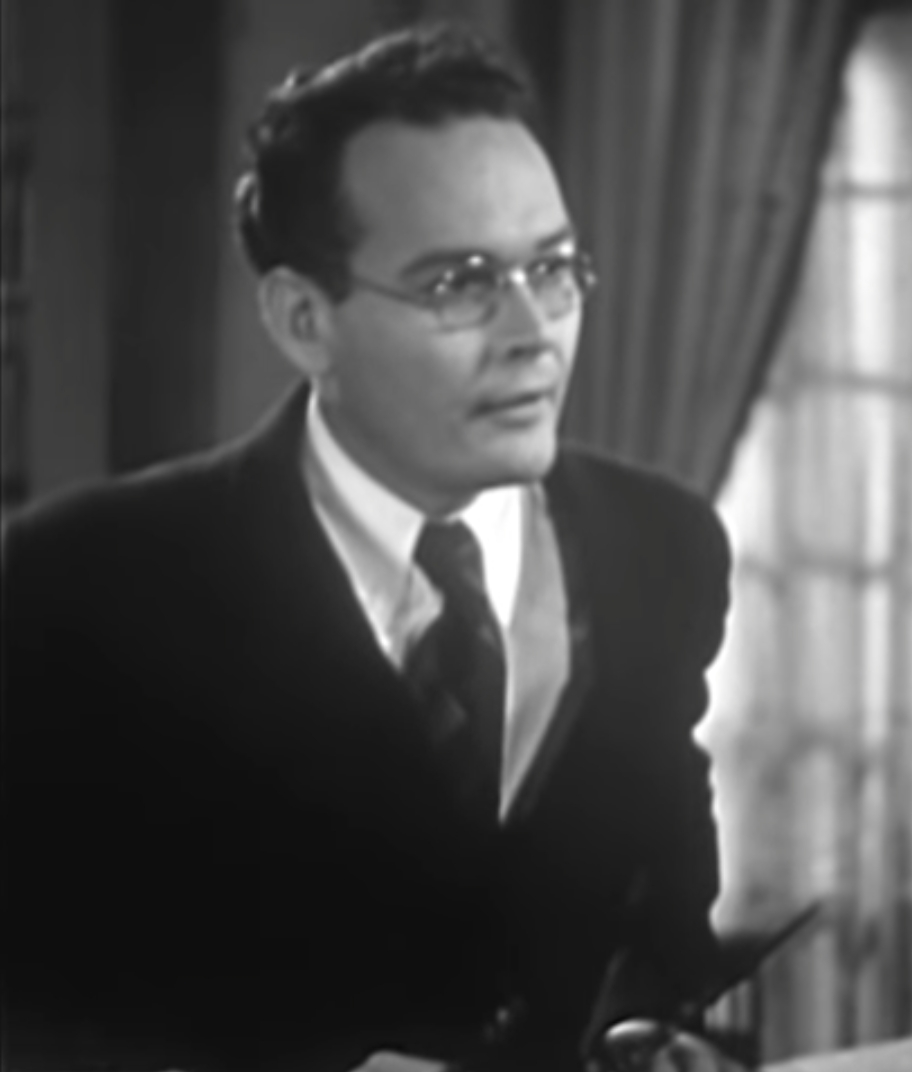
- Woods in Navy Blues (1937)
- Born: July 5, 1903
- Died: October 8, 1989 (aged 86)
- Education: University of Southern California
- Occupation: Actor
- Years active: 1923–1942
- Spouse: Margery Ramsey Morris (m. 1947)
- Children: 1

Edward Woods (July 5, 1903 – October 8, 1989) was an American actor. He is probably best known for his role as Matt Doyle in The Public Enemy opposite James Cagney.

== Life and career ==
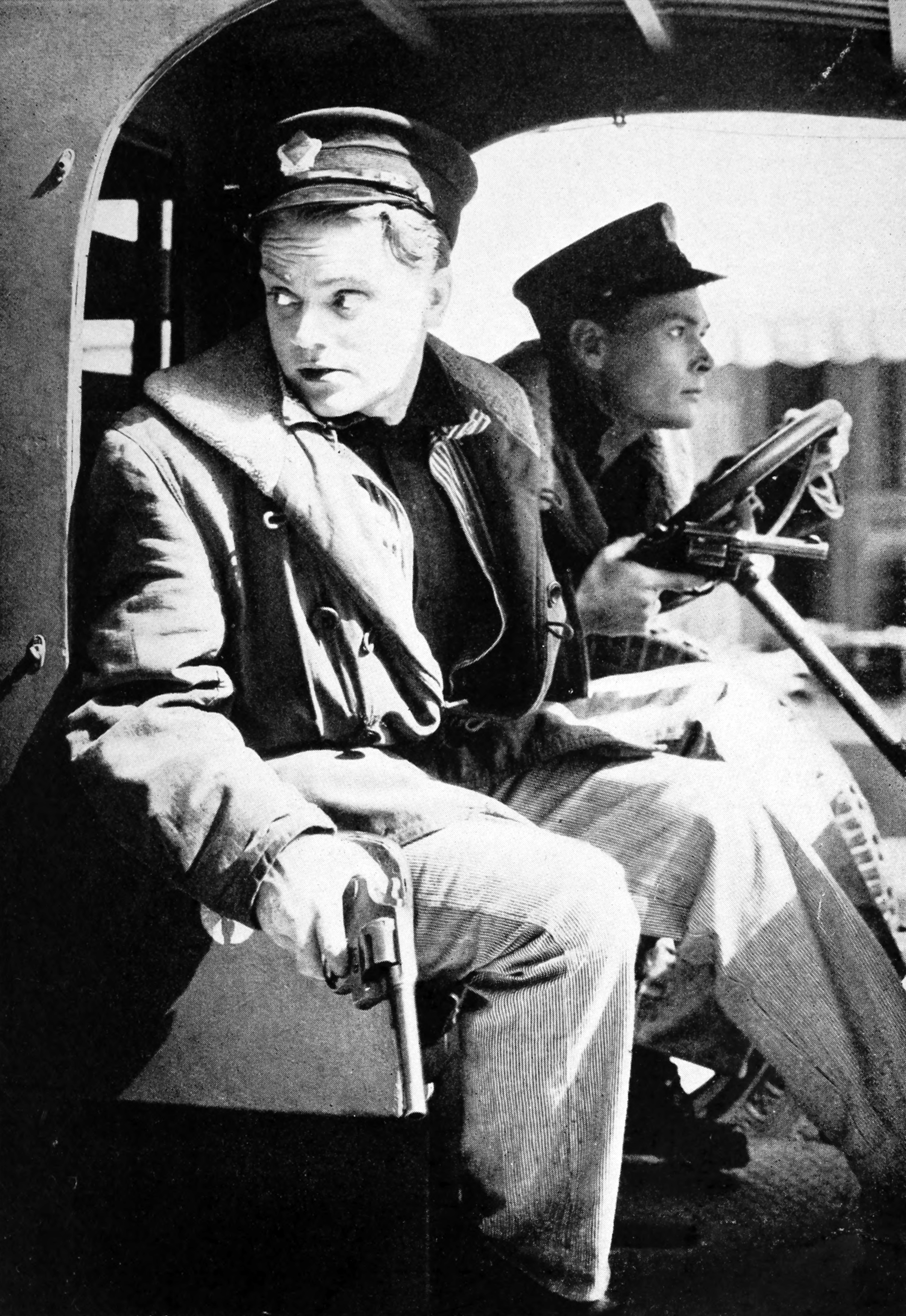
James Cagney and Edward Woods in The Public Enemy (1931)

Woods's parents were Mary Clark and William B. Woods, and he had two brothers, Roy C. and William B. Woods. After graduating from the University of Southern California, Woods became an actor. He appeared at the old Salt Lake Theatre in The Copperhead, as Lionel Barrymore's teenage son. In New York City, he appeared in many successful Broadway productions then began a movie career. He worked with Cary Grant, Greta Garbo, Jean Harlow, John Barrymore, and Clark Gable.

He played Matt Doyle opposite James Cagney's Tom Powers in The Public Enemy (1931).

Woods's acting credits on Broadway included Tortilla Flat (1938), One Good Year (1935), Houseparty (1929), Zeppelin (1929), Trapped (1928), and Speak Easy (1927). He was the producer of Buttrio Square (1952) on Broadway.

After his film acting career ended, Woods went into producing, directing, and theatrical management, working with the Schubert Organization and 20th Century Fox.

In 1947, Woods married Margery Ramsey "Gabrielle" Morris. In 1959, they adopted a daughter, Robin. Woods retired in 1975, and moved to Salt Lake City, Utah. He died in 1989.

== Filmography ==
Year	Title	Role	Notes
1930	Mothers Cry	Daniel 'Danny' Williams	
1931	The Public Enemy	Matt Doyle	
1931	Local Boy Makes Good	Spike Hoyt	
1932	They Never Come Back	Ralph Landon	
1932	Hot Saturday	Conny Billop	
1933	Reckless Decision		(archive footage)
1933	Bondage	Earl Crawford	
1933	Tarzan the Fearless	Bob Hall	
1933	Dinner at Eight	Eddie	
1933	Marriage on Approval	Billy McGee	
1935	Fighting Lady	Jimmie Hanford	
1937	Navy Blues	Julian Everett	
1938	Shadows Over Shanghai	Peter Roma	

== Broadway Appearances ==
- Tortilla Flat, Jan 12, 1938 - Jan 1938
- One Good Year, Nov 27, 1935 - Jun 1936
- Houseparty, Sep 9, 1929 - Feb 1930
- Zeppelin, Jan 14, 1929 - Mar 1929
- Trapped, Sep 11, 1928 - Sep 1928
- Speak Easy, Sep 26, 1927 - Nov 1927
