= Local Boy Makes Good =

1931 film

- Theatrical release poster
- Directed by: Mervyn LeRoy
- Screenplay by: Robert Lord; Raymond Griffith; Ray Enright
- Starring: Joe E. Brown; Dorothy Lee; Ruth Hall; Edward Woods; Edward Nugent; Wade Boteler
- Cinematography: Sol Polito
- Edited by: Jack Killifer
- Production company: First National Pictures
- Distributed by: Warner Bros. Pictures
- Release date: November 27, 1931
- Running time: 68 minutes
- Country: United States
- Language: English
- Budget: $310,000
- Box office: $643,000

Local Boy Makes Good is a 1931 American Pre-Code comedy film directed by Mervyn LeRoy and written by Robert Lord, Raymond Griffith and Ray Enright. The film stars Joe E. Brown, Dorothy Lee, Ruth Hall, Edward Woods, Edward Nugent and Wade Boteler. The film was released by Warner Bros. Pictures on November 27, 1931.

== Plot ==
Sheepish bookstore employee John Miller has become infatuated with a college girl, Julia Winters, he has never met. His love letters to her are accidentally mailed, so Julia comes to visit, under the mistaken impression John is a college track star.

While co-worker Marjorie helps continue his deception, John tries to join the school's team. His wild javelin throw nearly kills other athletes, who chase him off the field. The college's coach is amazed at how fast John can run.

Julia figures out she's been had. A psychology student, she analyzes John as a boy with an inferiority complex. After the coach finds John and invites him to run, Julia persuades him to race against her old boyfriend, Spike Hoyt, a star athlete and a bully. Majorie eventually talks John into it, even getting him drunk enough to do it.

== Cast ==
- Joe E. Brown as John Augustus Miller
- Dorothy Lee as Julia Winters
- Ruth Hall as Marjorie Blake
- Edward Woods as Spike Hoyt
- Edward Nugent as Wally Pierce
- Wade Boteler as Doc
- John Harrington as Coach Jackson
- William Burress as Colonel Small

== Box office ==
According to Warner Bros records the film earned $500,000 domestically and $143,000 foreign.

== Preservation status ==
- A print is housed in the Library of Congress collection.

== See also ==
- List of films about the sport of athletics
