= ReAction! Chemistry in the Movies =

2009 book by Mark Griep and Marjorie Mikasen

- Author: Mark Griep, Marjorie Mikasen
- Language: English
- Publisher: Oxford University Press USA
- Publication date: 2009
- ISBN: 978-0-19-532692-5

ReAction! Chemistry in the Movies (2009, ISBN 978-0-19-532692-5) is a nonfiction book about movies, chemistry, and chemistry in the movies by Chemistry Professor Mark Griep and Artist Marjorie Mikasen published by Oxford University Press USA. The authors were awarded an Alfred P. Sloan Foundation grant in the area of Public Understanding of Science to research and write the book.

This book is about the chemistry when it is part of the narrative. Most of the examples are contemporary popular feature films while some are documentaries, shorts, silents, and international films. The book uses the dualities personified by the benevolent Dr. Jekyll on one hand and the evil Mr. Hyde on the other to describe how chemists and chemistry are portrayed in the movies.

There are 10 chapters, the first five of which have dark chemical themes and the second five of which have bright chemical themes. The chapter titles are:

- 1. Dr. Jekyll's Mysterious Transformative Formula
- 2. Invisibility Steals the Seen: Chemistry Creates Criminal Opportunities
- 3. Isomorphs of Paranoia: Chemical Arsenals
- 4. Bad Company: The Business of Toxicity
- 5. A Master/Slave Narrative: Drug Addiction and Psychoactives
- 6. Inventors and their Often Wacky Chemical Inventions
- 7. Hard Science = Hard Evidence: Forensic Chemistry and Chemical Detectives
- 8. Chem 101: Learning by Doing
- 9. Good News: Research & Medicinal Chemists Making a Difference
- 10. First, Do No Harm (but Before that, Self-Experiment)

According to several reviews, the book's strength is when it explores what might be the real chemicals that inspired the fictional compounds found in certain movies.

- Dr. Jekyll's 'Hyde formula'
- The invisibility drug monocaine from The Invisible Man film of 1933
- The 'green speck' and 'black object' extraterrestrial matter from The Andromeda Strain of 1971
- Elvis' GOOP varnish from the Clambake film of 1967
