= Modern Matrimony =

1923 silent film

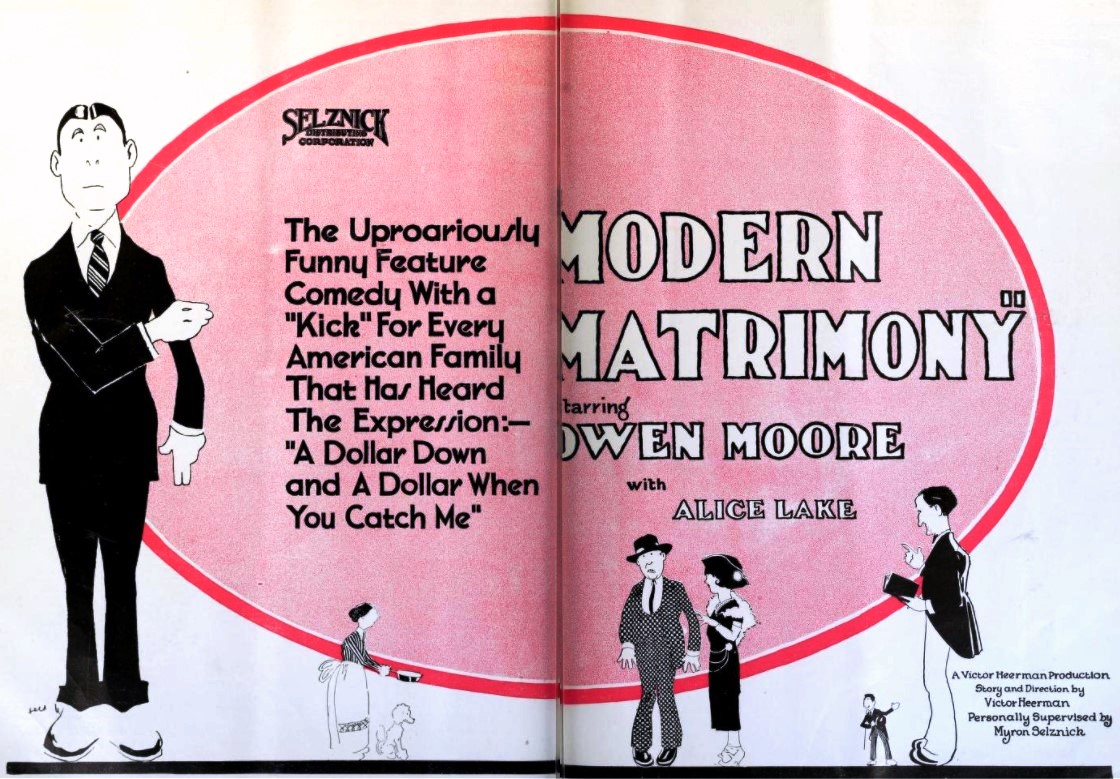
- Advertisement
- Directed by: Victor Heerman
- Written by: Victor Heerman; Sarah Y. Mason
- Starring: Owen Moore; Alice Lake; Mayme Kelso
- Cinematography: Jules Cronjager
- Production company: Selznick Pictures
- Distributed by: American Releasing Corporation; Selznick Pictures
- Release date: April 7, 1924
- Running time: 50 minutes
- Country: United States
- Language: Silent (English intertitles)

Modern Matrimony is a lost 1923 American silent comedy drama film directed by Victor Heerman and starring Owen Moore, Alice Lake, and Mayme Kelso.

== Cast ==
- Owen Moore as Chester Waddington
- Alice Lake as Patricia Waddington
- Mayme Kelso as Mrs. Flynn
- Frank Campeau as Mr. Flynn
- Kate Lester as Mrs. Rutherford
- Victor Potel as Junior Rutherford
- Snitz Edwards as Mr. Baltman
- Douglas Carter as Rastus

== Preservation ==
With no prints of Modern Matrimony having been found in any film archives, it is considered a lost film.

== Bibliography ==
- Robert B. Connelly. The Silents: Silent Feature Films, 1910-36, Volume 40, Issue 2. December Press, 1998.
