= Flaming Guns =

1932 film

- Theatrical release poster
- Directed by: Arthur Rosson
- Screenplay by: Jack Cunningham
- Based on: Oh, Promise Me; 1926 short story by Peter B. Kyne
- Produced by: Carl Laemmle, Jr. Stanley Bergerman
- Starring: Tom Mix; William Farnum; Ruth Hall; Clarence Wilson; George Hackathorne; Duke R. Lee
- Cinematography: Jerome Ash
- Edited by: Albert Akst
- Production company: Universal Pictures
- Distributed by: Universal Pictures
- Release date: December 22, 1932
- Running time: 57 minutes
- Country: United States
- Language: English

Flaming Guns is a 1932 American Western film directed by Arthur Rosson. The screenplay was written by Jack Cunningham based on the 1926 short story by Peter B. Kyne. The film stars Tom Mix, William Farnum, Ruth Hall, Clarence Wilson, George Hackathorne and Duke R. Lee. The film was released on December 22, 1932, by Universal Pictures. The story was also the basis for the 1926 film The Buckaroo Kid and the 1933 serial Gordon of Ghost City.

== Plot ==
In 1918, soldier Tom Malone returns from the war to Lone Pine, CA, and is hired by "Uncle" Mulford to stop rustlers who have been stealing his cattle. City banker Henry Ramsey and his three daughters pass through town, and Ramsey, impressed with Tom, hires him to be the foreman of his Rancho Casa Grande in Los Angeles, which has been mysteriously losing cattle under the management of J. P. "Red" McIntyre. When Tom arrives at Casa Grande, he asks Ramsey for twenty percent of the ranch profits as a salary and takes Ramsey's daughter Mary to lunch. After McIntyre is held up in a raid at the restaurant, Tom is prepared to take his place, but Ramsey, angry at Tom for his audacity and his interest in Mary, fires him and leaves for the city. Tom stays at the ranch, which has lost 750 head of cattle, and sends for Mary. When Ramsey realizes Tom is still running Casa Grande, he hurries to the ranch and finds Tom busily apprehending McIntyre and his men, who were trying to steal 1,000 head of cattle. Ramsey arrives and has Tom arrested on a rustling charge, even though Mary assures her father that Tom saved him $20,000 worth of cattle. Ramsey agrees to withdraw his complaint only on condition that Tom leave the county and promise never to see Mary again. Tom escapes jail and sneaks into the ranch, renewing a playful promise he made to split Ramsey's ears if he doesn't give him what he wants. Ramsey, terrified, offers him his job back with half-interest in the ranch. Tom then tells Mary he wants one hundred percent interest in her, and they race off to the Mexican border on horseback. Ramsey assumes Mary was kidnapped and chases the couple. At the border, after Tom asks the guard to keep his fiancée's father from crossing, he and Mary marry.

== Cast ==
- Tom Mix as Tom Malone
- William Farnum as Henry Ramsey
- Ruth Hall as Mary Ramsey
- Clarence Wilson as J.P. Mulford
- George Hackathorne as Hugh
- Duke R. Lee as Red McIntyre
- Gilbert Holmes as Ranch hand Pee Wee
- Tony Jr. the Horse as Tony
