= Navy Blues (1937 film) =

1937 film by Ralph Staub

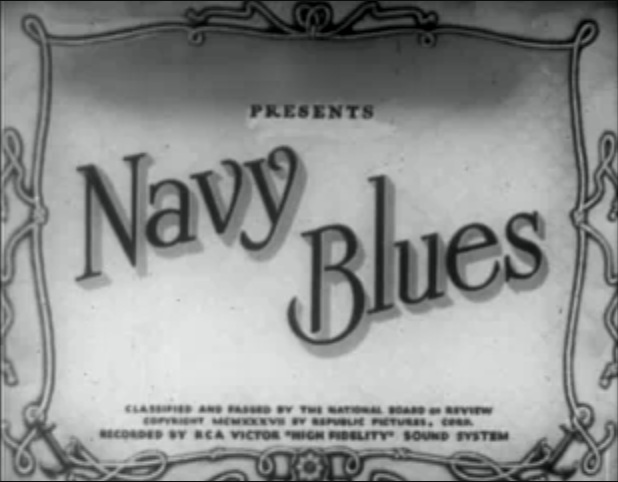
- Directed by: Ralph Staub
- Written by: Gordon Kahn; Eric Taylor
- Produced by: Burt Kelly
- Starring: Dick Purcell
- Cinematography: Jack A. Marta
- Edited by: Murray Seldeen
- Music by: Harry Grey
- Distributed by: Republic Pictures
- Release date: March 29, 1937
- Running time: 67 minutes
- Country: United States
- Language: English

Navy Blues is a 1937 American film directed by Ralph Staub.

== Plot summary ==
A sailor bets his friends he can date any woman he wants to. They pick out a librarian with a reputation as a "cold fish", and when he pursues her he discovers that he has competition—and his rival has much more sinister intentions than he does.

== Cast ==
- Mary Brian as Doris Kimbell
- Dick Purcell as Russell J. 'Rusty' Gibbs
- Warren Hymer as Gerald 'Biff' Jones
- Joe Sawyer as Chips
- Edward Woods as Julian Everett
- Horace McMahon as Gateleg
- Chester Clute as Uncle Andrew Wayne
- Lucile Gleason as Aunt Beulah Wayne
- Ruth Fallows as Goldie
- Alonzo Price as Dr. Crowley
- Mel Ruick as Lawson
- Carleton Young as Spencer, of Naval Intelligence
