= The Sunbeam =

1912 film

- Directed by: D. W. Griffith
- Written by: George Hennessy
- Starring: Ynez Seabury; Kate Bruce; Claire McDowell; Dell Henderson
- Cinematography: G. W. Bitzer
- Distributed by: Biograph Company
- Release date: February 26, 1912
- Running time: 17 minutes
- Country: United States
- Language: Silent (English intertitles)

The Sunbeam is a 1912 American short silent drama film directed by D. W. Griffith.

== Plot ==
A small child whose mother is dying wanders out of the room and encounters a stern spinster and an unhappy bachelor. Through her innocent appeal, she brings the two adults together. When they discover the mother has died, they decide to care for the newly orphaned child and find happiness together.

== Cast ==
- Ynez Seabury as Sunbeam
- Kate Bruce as Sunbeam's Mamma
- Claire McDowell as Spinster
- Dell Henderson as Bachelor

== See also ==
- List of American films of 1912
- D. W. Griffith filmography
