= The Widow's Might (1918 film) =

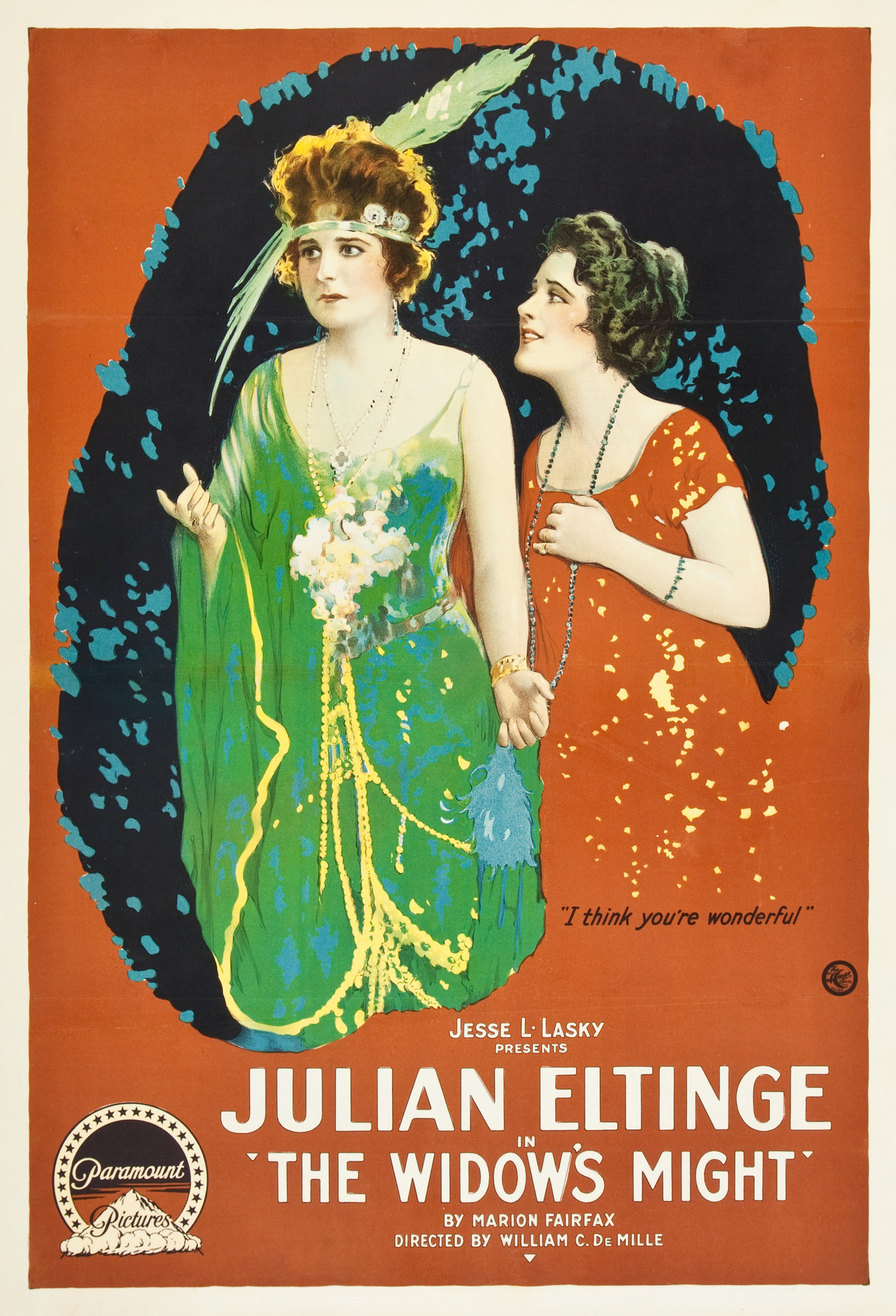
- Theatrical release poster
- Directed by: William C. deMille
- Screenplay by: Marion Fairfax
- Produced by: Jesse L. Lasky
- Starring: Julian Eltinge; Florence Vidor; Gustav von Seyffertitz; Mayme Kelso
- Cinematography: Charles Rosher
- Production company: Jesse L. Lasky Feature Play Company
- Distributed by: Paramount Pictures
- Release date: January 28, 1918
- Running time: 50 minutes
- Country: United States
- Language: Silent (English intertitles)

The Widow's Might is a 1918 American silent comedy film directed by William C. deMille and written by Marion Fairfax. The film stars Julian Eltinge, Florence Vidor, Gustav von Seyffertitz, Mayme Kelso, James Neill, and Larry Steers. The film was released on January 28, 1918, by Paramount Pictures.

== Cast ==
- Julian Eltinge as Dick Tavish
- Florence Vidor as Irene Stuart
- Gustav von Seyffertitz as Horace Hammer
- Mayme Kelso as Mrs. Pomeroy
- James Neill as Red
- Larry Steers as Pete
- George Mackenzie as Cob
- William Elmer

== Preservation ==
With no prints of The Widow's Might located in any film archives, it is a lost film.
