= Mayme Kelso =

American actress (1867–1946)

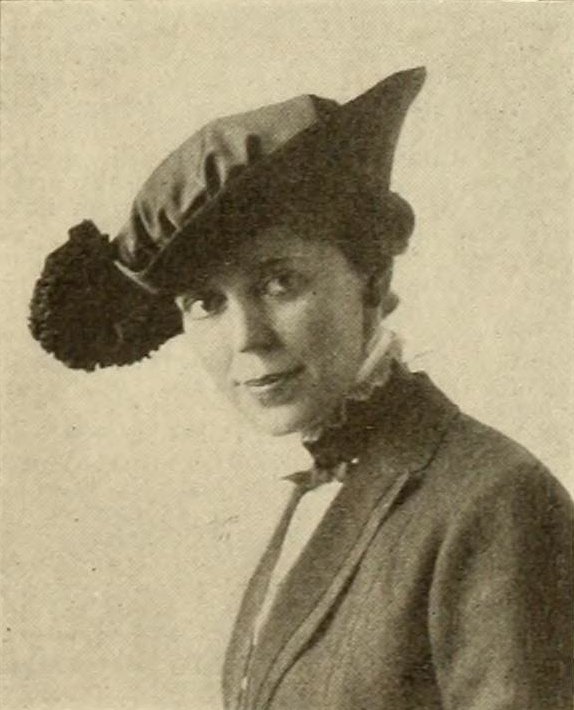
- Kelso c. 1914
- Born: February 28, 1867; Ohio, U.S.
- Died: June 5, 1946 (aged 79); South Pasadena, California, U.S.
- Other names: May Kelso, Maym Kelso
- Occupation: Actress
- Years active: 1894–1927

Mary L. "Mayme" Kelso (February 28, 1867 – June 5, 1946), also known as May or Maym Kelso, was an American actress and recording artist. She appeared in more than 70 silent films between 1911 and 1927. Born in Ohio (some sources state Dayton, others Columbus) and died in South Pasadena, California from a heart attack. She is especially known for her performances in Seven Keys to Baldpate (1925), Male and Female (1919), and Clarence (1922).

== Broadway ==
Kelso's first Broadway performance was as Mrs. Magrueder in About Town in 1894. Other stage performances include:

- The Geisha (1896, Dorothy Sweet)
- Broadway to Tokio (1900, Anisette)
- The Defender (1902, Mrs. Everly Chase)
- A Midsummer Night's Dream (1903, Second Fairy)
- The Hurdy-Gurdy Girl (1907, Gwendolyn Fitzgerald)
- A Waltz Dream (1908, Friedericke)
- The Shanghai Gesture (1928, Lady Blessington)

== Partial filmography ==
- The Street Singer (1912)
- Samson (1914)
- The Bigger Man (1915)
- Slander (1916)
- Lost and Won (1917)
- Those Without Sin (1917)
- Castles for Two (1917)
- The Cost of Hatred (1917)
- The Primrose Ring (1917)
- The Silent Partner (1917)
- Rebecca of Sunnybrook Farm (1917)
- The Secret Game (1917)
- The Widow's Might (1918)
- The Honor of His House (1918)
- The White Man's Law (1918)
- The Thing We Love (1918)
- Old Wives for New (1918)
- The Cruise of the Make-Believes (1918)
- Mirandy Smiles (1918)
- The Mystery Girl (1918)
- You Never Saw Such a Girl (1919)
- Men, Women, and Money (1919)
- A Very Good Young Man (1919)
- Johnny Get Your Gun (1919)
- Why Smith Left Home (1919)
- In for Thirty Days (1919)
- Why Change Your Wife? (1920)
- Don't Ever Marry (1920)
- Jack Straw (1920)
- Simple Souls (1920)
- The Week-End (1920)
- Help Wanted - Male (1920)
- The Hope (1920)
- The Furnace (1920)
- Conrad in Quest of His Youth (1920)
- Ducks and Drakes (1921)
- The Lost Romance (1921)
- Her Sturdy Oak (1921)
- One Wild Week (1921)
- For the Defense (1922)
- Clarence (1922)
- Kick In (1922)
- Glass Houses (1922)
- The World's Applause (1923)
- Modern Matrimony (1923)
- Slander the Woman (1923)
- The Love Piker (1923)
- The Marriage Market (1923)
- Nellie, the Beautiful Cloak Model (1924)
- Dollar Down (1925)
- Seven Keys to Baldpate (1925)
- The Unchastened Woman (1925)
- The Danger Signal (1925)
- Flaming Waters (1925)
- Lightning Reporter (1926)
- Whispering Wires (1926)
- Vanity (1927)
- The Drop Kick (1927)
