= The Miser's Heart =

1911 film by D. W. Griffith

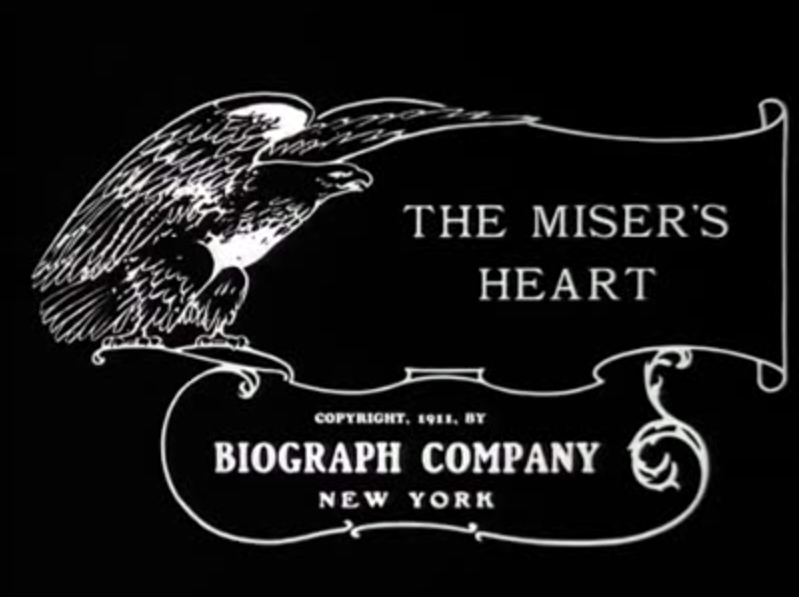
- Directed by: D. W. Griffith
- Written by: George Hennessy
- Starring: Blanche Sweet
- Cinematography: G. W. Bitzer
- Production company: Biograph Company
- Distributed by: Biograph Company
- Release date: November 20, 1911 (U.S.)
- Running time: 18 minutes
- Country: United States
- Language: Silent (English intertitles)

The Miser's Heart (1911)

The Miser's Heart is a 1911 American short silent drama film directed by D. W. Griffith for the Biograph Company. It stars Ynez Seabury as a child who befriends a miser and a thief. The film was shot in Fort Lee, New Jersey, where early film studios in America's first motion picture industry were based at the beginning of the 20th century. A print of the film survives.

== Plot ==
A mother is very ill, too ill to play with her young daughter Kathy. She tells her child to play by herself. Kathy makes friends with a miser who lives upstairs and later Jules, a thief who has stolen a bag of baked goods. Jules lets Kathy have some of his food, which Kathy in turn shares with the miser.

Meanwhile, two other thieves hear rumors of the miser's wealth. They break into his room and tie him up, but he refuses to give them the combination to his safe. When Kathy, who was sleeping in the room unbeknownst to the miser, wakes up, the crooks tie her up and dangle her by a rope outside, several stories above the ground, to pressure the old man. Kathy drops her doll, which lands near Jules. Jules runs for help. When the crooks start burning the rope holding Kathy, the miser gives them the combination. Jules returns with policemen, who spot Kathy before she is brought back into the room by one of the thieves. They rush upstairs and apprehend the criminals.

After the miser returns his money to the safe, he takes Kathy home to her worried mother. Then, seeing the squalid conditions they are living in, he gives the mother money for "medicine and maybe a doll."

== Cast ==
- Linda Arvidson as Kathy's mother
- Lionel Barrymore as Jules, the thief
- William J. Butler as policeman
- Donald Crisp as policeman
- Adele DeGarde as neighbor
- Edward Dillon as down-and-out young man
- Frank Evans as policeman
- Edith Haldeman as the little child
- Robert Harron as bakeshop assistant
- Adolph Lestina as the miser
- Wilfred Lucas as first crook
- Charles Hill Mailes as second crook
- Alfred Paget as policeman
- W. C. Robinson in front of clothing store
- Ynez Seabury as Little Kathy
- Blanche Sweet as neighbor
- Kate Toncray as the woman
- J. Waltham on street

== Analysis ==
Scott Simmon suggests in The Films of D. W. Griffith that the film is based on the novel Silas Marner by George Eliot, which Griffith had already adapted in his 1909 film A Fair Exchange. Simmon also believes that "reformation by a child of the brutal or heartless man is the single most pervasive narrative pattern in Griffith's Biographs."

== Preservation ==
The film survived through a paper print deposit at the Library of Congress.

== See also ==
- D. W. Griffith filmography
- Blanche Sweet filmography
- Lionel Barrymore filmography
