= Broderick O'Farrell =

American actor (1882–1955)

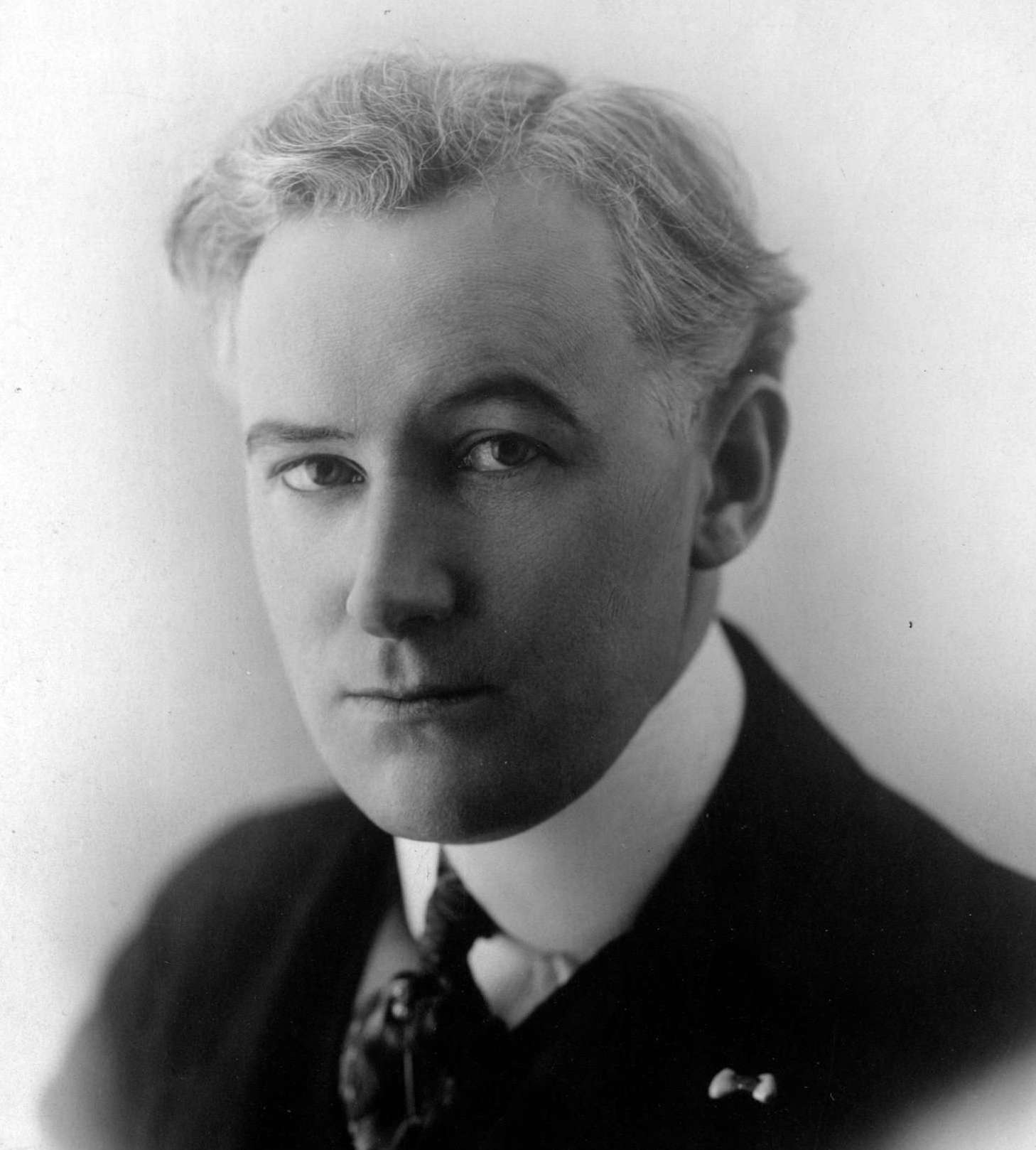
- Born: George William Broderick O'Farrell; July 13, 1882; Portland, Oregon, U.S.
- Died: September 2, 1955 (aged 73); Los Angeles, California, U.S.
- Occupation: Actor
- Years active: 1929-1949
- Spouse: Loretta Fitzpatrick

George William Broderick O'Farrell (July 13, 1882 — September 2, 1955) was an American film and stage actor who appeared in both silent and sound films. He began his career at age 14, appearing onstage with the Baker Stock Company in his hometown of Portland, Oregon. He subsequently appeared in several locally produced films, such as The Golden Trail (1920), before pursuing a film career in Los Angeles. He appeared in numerous silent films throughout the 1920s, and later had minor roles in several Laurel and Hardy films, including Beau Hunks (1931).

O'Farrell had minor bit parts throughout the 1940s, often appearing as conductors, doctors, and coroners in a variety of films. Some of his later credits include Mourning Becomes Electra (1947), Whispering Smith (1948), and The Girl from Jones Beach (1949). He died in Los Angeles at age 73 from a stroke.

== Biography ==
O'Farrell was born July 13, 1882 in Portland, Oregon, and where he was a regular performer with the Baker Stock Company beginning at age 14. He appeared in various stage productions in Portland and the Pacific Northwest, including theatrical productions in Seattle and Vancouver.

He began his film career in 1920 during the silent era, appearing in locally produced films such as the early serial short titled And Women Must Weep, in which he appeared opposite Mayo Methot. O'Farrell married Mae Norton in 1921, and had two children—a son, Kevin, and a daughter, Dawn—before separating.

He went on to appear in numerous silent pictures, followed by sound films. He appeared in several Laurel and Hardy films in minor roles, including Beau Hunks (1931). He supporting roles in numerous films, including No More Orchids (1932) with Carole Lombard, The World Accuses (1934), and the Western The Law of the 45's (1935). In the 1940s, O'Farrell primarily appeared in uncredited bit parts, being cast as butlers, coroners, and doctors. Some of his later credits include the film noir Experiment Perilous (1944), starring Hedy Lamarr; the aviation adventure film Blaze of Noon (1946), and Mourning Becomes Electra (1947).

== Death ==
O'Farrell died in Los Angeles on September 2, 1955, of complications from a stroke. He was survived by his two children, and his second wife, Loretta Fitzpatrick. He was interred at the San Fernando Mission Cemetery.

== Select filmography ==
Year	Title	Role	Notes	Ref.
1920	The Golden Trail	Bill Lee		
1922	And Women Must Weep		Serial short film	
1926	The Smoke Eaters	Roscoe Wingate		
1926	Skinner's Dress Suit	Mr. Wilkins		
1927	The Princess from Hoboken	Immigration Officer		
1927	The Lookout Girl	Hargrave		
1928	The Tiger's Shadow	Amos Crain		
1929	Behind Closed Doors	John Barton		
1931	Beau Hunks	Fort Arid Commander		
1931	The Sea Ghost	Chairman of the Court-Martial		
1931	The Drums of Jeopardy	Dr. Brett		
1932	No More Orchids	Benton		
1934	The World Accuses	Dr. Jarvis		
1934	Badge of Honor	Howard Kent		
1934	The Marines Are Coming	Doctor		
1935	The Law of the 45's	Sir Henry Sheffield		
1940	Stranger on the Third Floor	Minister in Dream		
1942	Pittsburgh	Doorman		
1944	Experiment Perilous	Frank - Bedereaux's Butler		
1946	Two Sisters from Boston	Doorman		
1946	Under Nevada Skies	Coroner		
1947	Blaze of Noon	Doctor		
1947	Mourning Becomes Electra	Station Master		
1948	Whispering Smith	Conductor		
1949	The Girl from Jones Beach	Guest		

== Sources ==
- Bradley, Edwin M. (2009). The First Hollywood Sound Shorts, 1926-1931. Jefferson, North Carolina: McFarland. ISBN 978-0-786-44319-2.
- Pitts, Michael R. (2015). RKO Radio Pictures Horror, Science Fiction and Fantasy Films, 1929-1956. Jefferson, North Carolina: McFarland. ISBN 978-1-476-61683-4.
