= The Calgary Stampede =

1925 American silent Western film

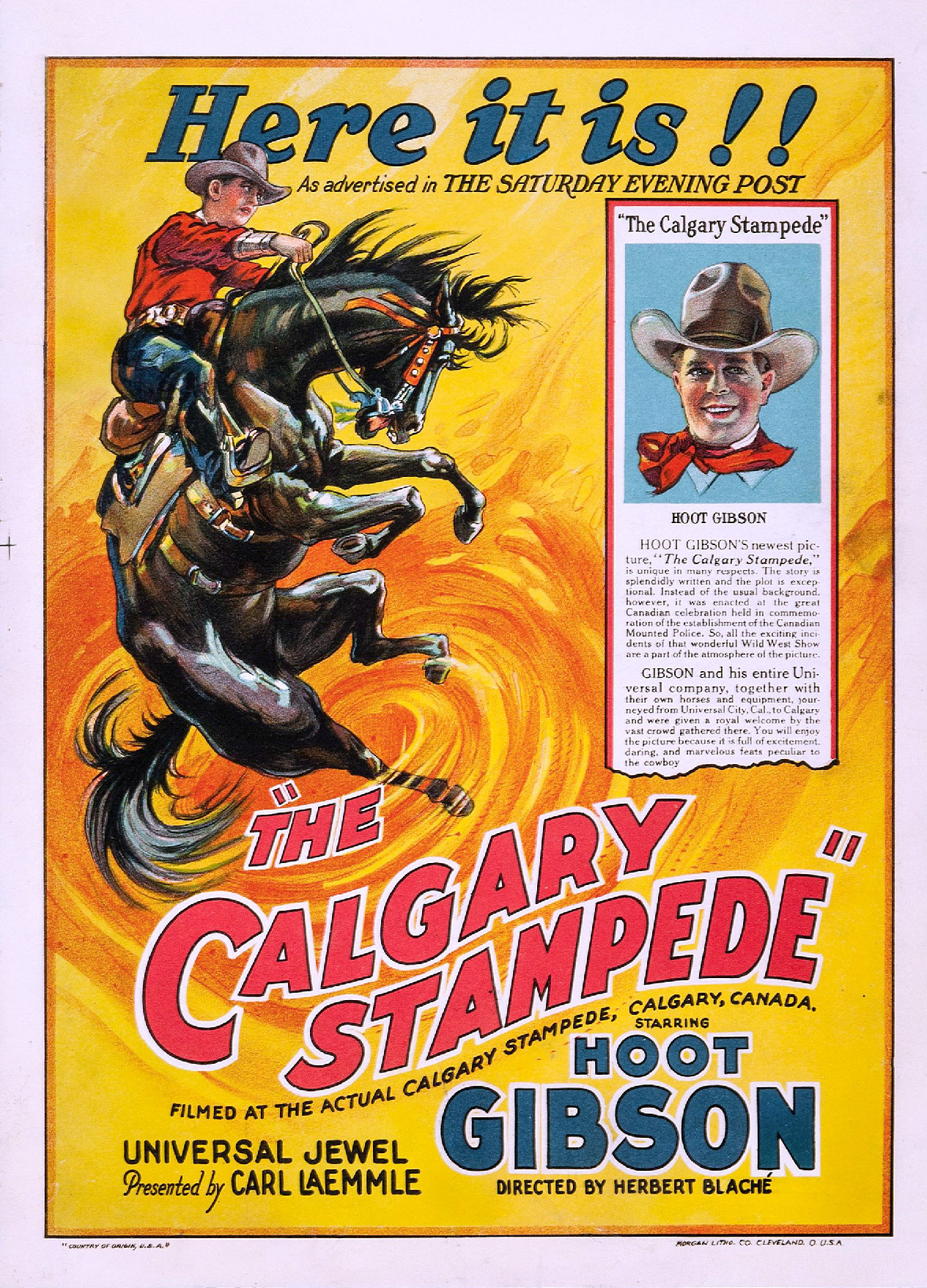
- Window card
- Directed by: Herbert Blaché
- Written by: Raymond L. Schrock; Donald W. Lee
- Story by: E. Richard Schayer
- Produced by: Carl Laemmle
- Starring: Hoot Gibson; Virginia Brown Faire
- Cinematography: Harry Neumann
- Distributed by: Universal Pictures
- Release date: November 1, 1925
- Running time: 60 minutes
- Country: United States
- Languages: Silent; English intertitles

The Calgary Stampede is a 1925 American silent Western film directed by Herbert Blaché and starring Hoot Gibson. It was produced and distributed by Universal Pictures.

== Plot ==
As described in a film magazine, Dan Malloy (Gibson), an American cowboy noted as a Roman rider, is in Canada seeking adventure. He finds it in pretty Marie LaFarge (Faire), who loves him and is agreeable to his proposal of marriage, but declines to become his wife because she fears it will break the heart of her father, Jean LaFarge (Faunce), who has ordered the cowboy to keep away from his Marie, declaring that he, LaFarge, cannot endure the thought of having grandchildren bearing the detested name of Malloy.

Out of patience with waiting, Malloy decides to take Marie with him, and goes to her house with two horses during the absence of LaFarge, who returns unexpectedly and storms with rage when he sees Malloy in his house. He orders Marie from the room and raises his whip to strike the cowboy. At this moment Fred Burgess (Corey), just out of prison on a charge made by La Farge, and seeking revenge for just punishment, sneaks up to the window and fires a shot which kills LaFarge. Malloy jumps on his horse and pursues the murderer, who eludes him in the chase, after Malloy has wasted a shot on him.

Marie's Indian maid Neenah (Seabury), who loves and is betrothed to Burgess, shields him by telling Marie that nobody has been on the premises except Malloy. This is repeated to Sergeant Bill Harkness (McCulley) of the R.N.W. Mounted, who follows Malloy and amazes him by accusing him of the killing. The discharged cartridge in Malloy's gun is enough for the mountie, who places the cowboy under arrest. Burgess, seeing them from the plain of Wainright Reserve, the government sanctuary for a great herd of bison, frightens the animals into a stampede in the hope of stamping out the life of the one man who can testify against him. Malloy and Harkness take to their horses and flee before the onrushing herd. Harkness is thrown and Malloy saves his life, returning to the LaFarge house with the injured mountie and then escaping.

Playing the part of a half-wit, he gets a job on a distant ranch as chore boy. He is suspected by a mounted policeman who brings Marie to identify him. Although believing him guilty, she swears she has never seen him before. His new boss, Andrew Regan (Sellon), has been training a pair of Roman horses for the forthcoming Calgary Rodeo. At the meet, he is taunted by a neighboring rancher to wager his entire ranch and stock on his horses. Regan's rider breaks his leg in an earlier event and Regan orders his foreman Blackie, who is drunk, to ride for him. Malloy, seeing Regan's doom, goes to the stable and knocks out Blackie. He gets to the starting line just in time to ride for Regan. Bill Harkness sees Malloy and waits for the finish to arrest him. Burgess, who has found another sweetie, infuriates the Indian girl with a slurring remark which causes her to bare his guilt. Burgess escapes in a buckboard and is pursued by Malloy on horseback. Burgess is thrown over an embankment. Before he dies he confesses, clearing Malloy, whose Irish name is now certain to be borne by the grandchildren of the late Jean LaFarge.

== Cast ==
- Hoot Gibson as Dan Malloy
- Virginia Browne Faire as Marie La Farge
- Pierre Faunce as Jean La Farge
- Clark Comstock as Al Morton
- Ynez Seabury as Neenah
- Jim Corey as Fred Burgess
- Philo McCullough as Sgt. Callahan R.C.M.P.
- W. T. McCulley as Sgt. Bill Harkness R.C.M.P.
- Ena Gregory as Trixie Regan
- Charles Sellon as Andrew Regan
- Tex Young as Cook
- Bob Gillis as Morton
- Pat Patterson as Ed Corbett
- Hank Bell as Cowhand at Rodeo (uncredited)
- Walter Brennan as Racing Spectator in Grandstand at Rodeo (uncredited)

== Preservation status ==
The Calgary Stampede survives in several film archives.

== See also ==
- Hoot Gibson filmography
