= The Honor of His House =

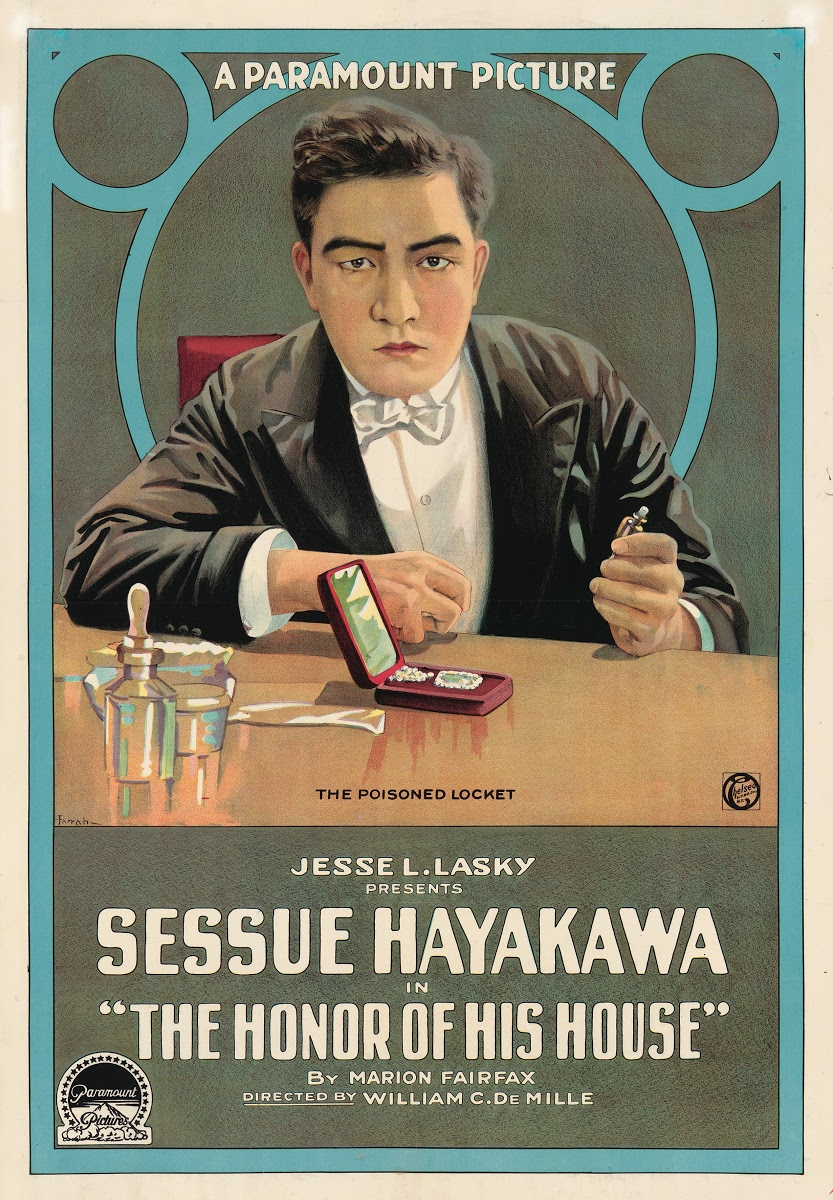
- Movie poster
- Directed by: William C. deMille
- Screenplay by: Marion Fairfax
- Starring: Sessue Hayakawa; Florence Vidor; Jack Holt; Mayme Kelso; Kisaburo Kurihara; Forrest Seabury
- Cinematography: Charles Rosher
- Production company: Famous Players–Lasky Corporation
- Distributed by: Paramount Pictures
- Release date: April 1, 1918
- Running time: 50 minutes
- Country: United States
- Language: Silent (English intertitles)

The Honor of His House is a 1918 American silent drama film directed by William C. deMille and written by Marion Fairfax. The film stars Sessue Hayakawa, Florence Vidor, Jack Holt, Mayme Kelso, Kisaburo Kurihara, and Forrest Seabury. The film was released on 1 April 1918, by Paramount Pictures.

== Plot ==
Dr Robert Farlow and affluent toxicologist, Count Ito Onato, both fall in love with Lora, a stunning Japanese-American girl, when they are stranded on a desert island. Despite the fact that Lora prefers Robert, she chooses to reject him due to his frequent drinking habits. Following their rescue, Lora marries Count Ito, but Robert, who is still in love with her and determined to regain her heart, stops drinking and quickly builds a medical reputation that is second only to the count's. Once more, Lora is approached by Robert, who offers to elope with her, but she declines. But the count poisons his wife because he thinks she's been unfaithful. The count decides to give Lora a significant transfusion of his own blood after finding that she is innocent even though he would die during the procedure. Ito's son is born to Lora after she survives, and she subsequently weds the remorseful Robert.

== Cast ==
- Sessue Hayakawa as Count Ito Onato
- Florence Vidor as Lora Horning
- Jack Holt as Robert Farlow
- Mayme Kelso as Mrs. Proudweather
- Kisaburo Kurihara as Sato
- Forrest Seabury as Mr. Proudweather

== Reception ==
The Toronto Daily Star said of the film that it was "a photo-drama of rare strength featuring Sessue Hayakawa, the well-known Japanese actor. This photo-play has an absorbing theme that rises in the denouement to a tragic height, the supreme sacrifice of one man securing the happiness of the woman he loves and insuring her a peaceful future with her child. Sessue Hayakawa plays the principal role with that reserve of intense strength that marks all his characterizations. He is surrounded by a magnificent cast headed by Florence Vidor."
