= Such a Little Pirate =

1918 film by George Melford

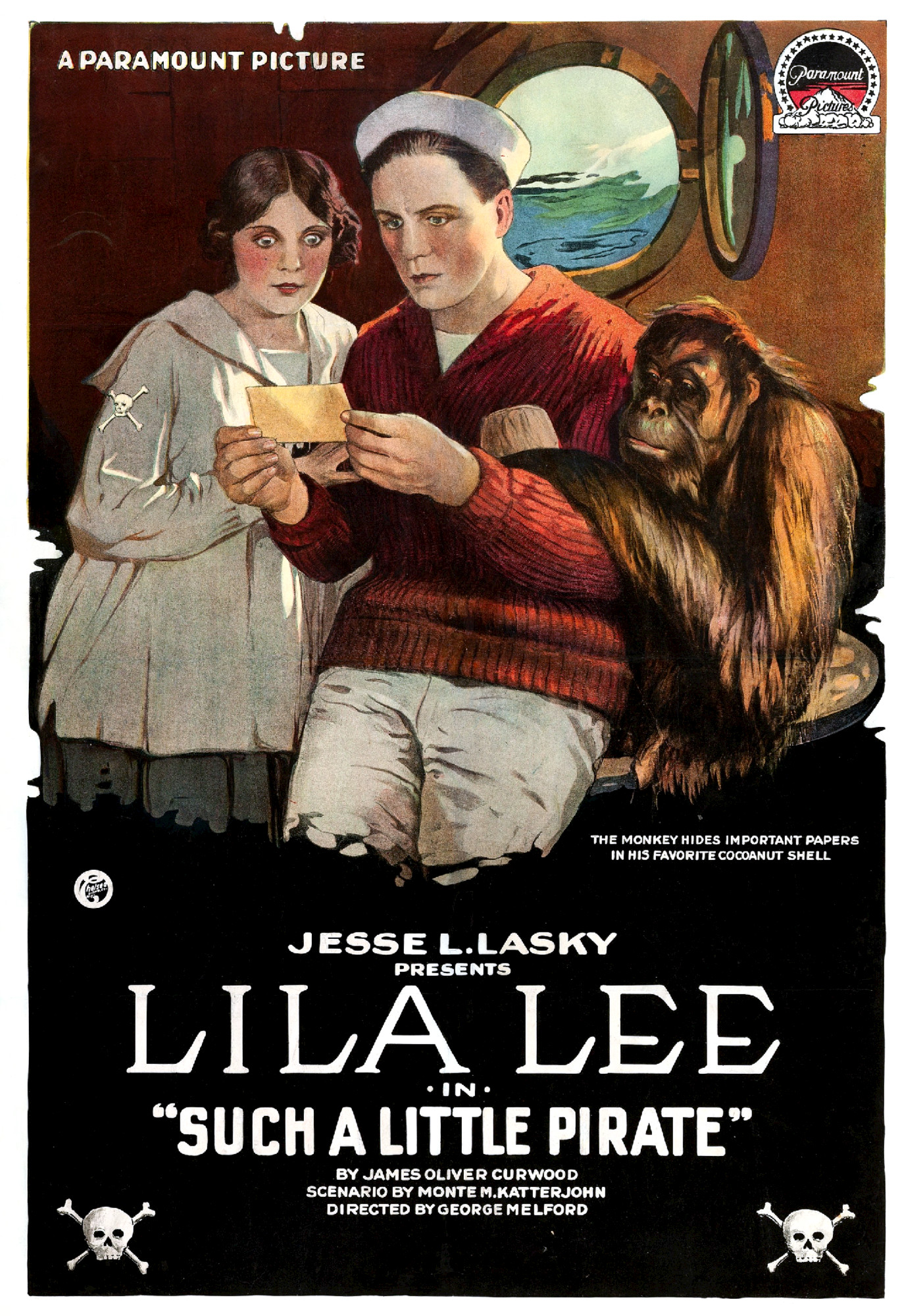
- Film poster
- Directed by: George Melford; Claude Mitchell (assistant director)
- Written by: Monte Katterjohn
- Based on: Peggy the Pirate by James Oliver Curwood
- Produced by: Famous Players–Lasky
- Starring: Lila Lee; Theodore Roberts; Harrison Ford
- Cinematography: Paul Perry
- Distributed by: Paramount Pictures
- Release date: October 6, 1918
- Running time: 50 minutes
- Country: United States
- Language: Silent (English intertitles)

Such a Little Pirate is a lost 1918 American silent Pirate adventure film directed by George Melford and starring Lila Lee as a young sea-going heroine and Theodore Roberts as her grandfather. It was produced by Adolph Zukor and Jesse L. Lasky.

== Cast ==
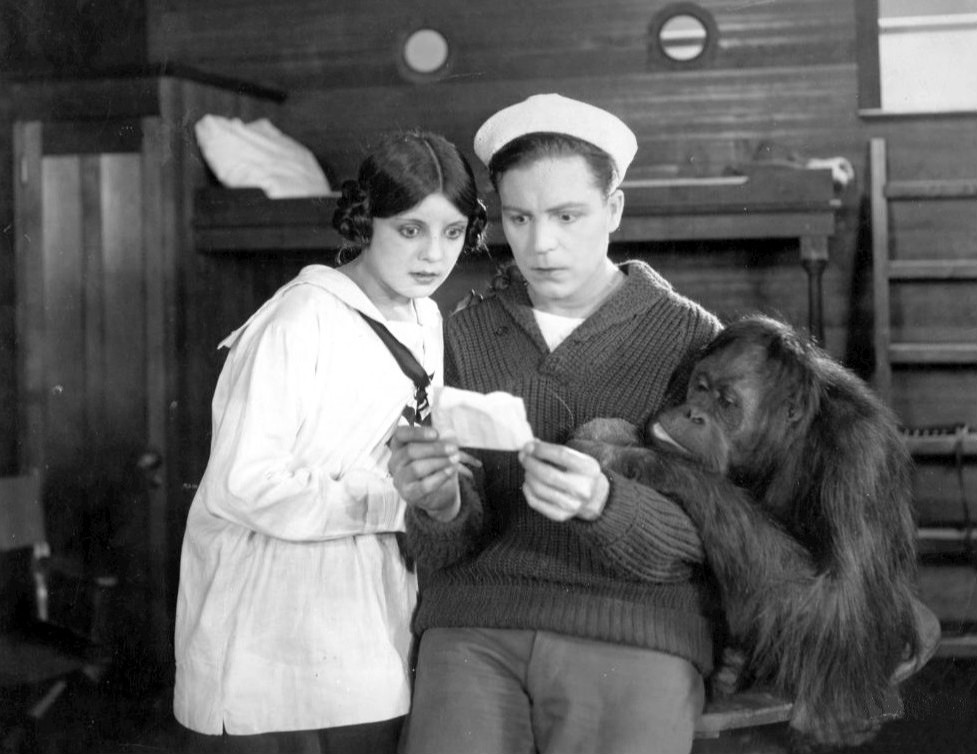
Scene from the film

- Lila Lee as Patricia Wolf
- Theodore Roberts as Obadiah Wolf
- Harrison Ford as Rory O'Malley
- Guy Oliver as Bad-Eye
- Forrest Seabury as Ellory Glendenning
- J. Parks Jones as Harold Glendenning
- Adele Farrington as Mrs. Glendenning

== Reception ==
On Rotten Tomatoes, the film holds an approval rating of 80% based on 5 reviews.

Joshua Lowe of Variety called Such a Little Pirate "a clean, wholesome, simple, straight-away tale".

The New York Times praised Theodore Roberts for his role as Obadiah Wolf, writing that the film "gains its chief merit".
