= Ruth Hall (actress) =

American actress (1910–2003)

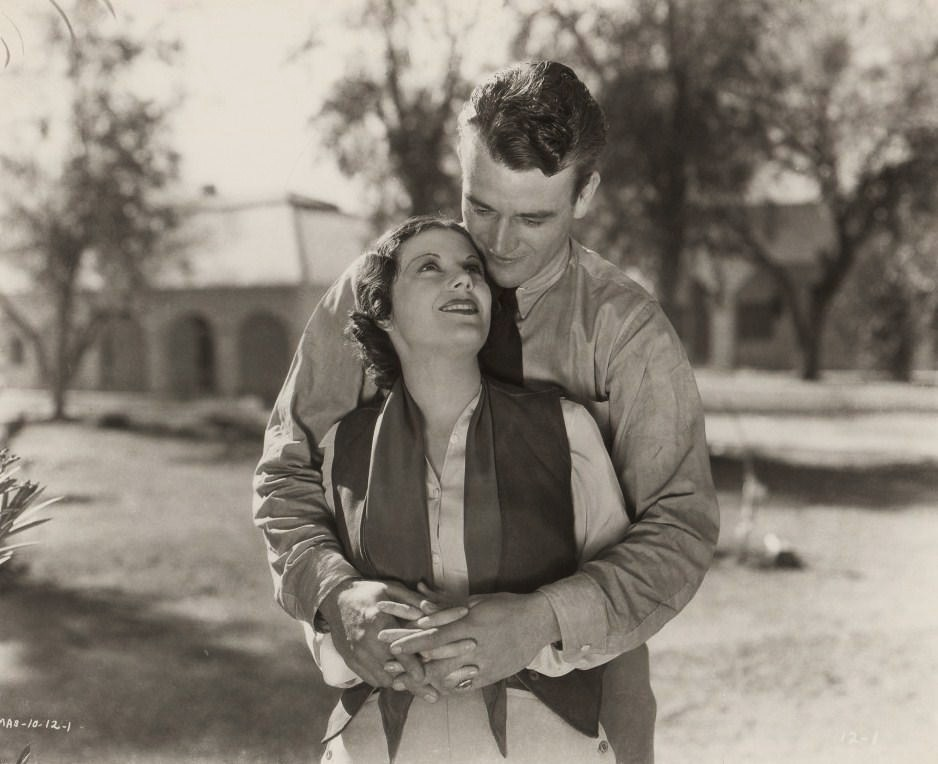
- Hall and John Wayne in The Three Musketeers (1933)
- Born: Ruth Gloria Blasco Ibáñez; December 29, 1910; Jacksonville, Florida, U.S.
- Died: October 9, 2003 (aged 92); Glendale, California, U.S.
- Years active: 1930-1935
- Spouse: Lee Garmes (m. 1933-1978, his death)
- Children: 2

Ruth Hall (born Ruth Gloria Blasco Ibáñez; December 29, 1910 – October 9, 2003) was an American film actress.

Born in Jacksonville, Florida, Hall was a 1929 graduate of Henry B. Plant High School in Tampa, Florida.

Hall was a great-niece of Vicente Blasco Ibáñez, the Spanish novelist. She took her mother's maiden name as her professional name so as not to benefit from the novelist's more celebrated last name. In 1931, she signed a contract with Paramount Pictures.

== Personal life ==
She was married to cinematographer Lee Garmes from 1933 until his death on August 31, 1978. They had two daughters.

Ruth Hall died in 2003 in Glendale, California, aged 92.

== Partial filmography ==
- Hell Harbor (1930)
- For the Defense (1930)
- The Drums of Jeopardy (1931)
- Manhattan Parade (1931)
- Local Boy Makes Good (1931)
- Chances (1931)
- Monkey Business (1931)
- Her Majesty, Love (1931)
- A Fool's Advice (1932)
- The Gambling Sex (1932)
- The Kid from Spain (1932)
- The Heart of New York (1932)
- Miss Pinkerton (1932)
- Dynamite Ranch (1932)
- Between Fighting Men (1932)
- Flaming Guns (1932)
- Ride Him, Cowboy (1932)
- One Way Passage (1932) (uncredited)
- Union Depot (1932)
- Murder on the Campus (1933)
- The Three Musketeers (1933 serial)
- The Man from Monterey (1933)
- The Return of Casey Jones (1933)
- Strawberry Roan (1933)
- Beloved (1934)
- Badge of Honor (1934)
