= In for Thirty Days =

1919 silent film directed by Webster Cullison

- Directed by: Webster Cullison
- Screenplay by: Thomas J. Geraghty (scenario); George D. Baker (scenario)
- Story by: Luther A. Reed
- Produced by: George D. Baker
- Starring: May Allison; Robert Ellis; Mayme Kelso
- Cinematography: William E. Fildew
- Production company: Metro Pictures
- Release date: January 27, 1919 (US)
- Running time: 5 reels
- Country: United States
- Language: English

In for Thirty Days is a 1919 American silent comedy film, directed by Webster Cullison. It stars May Allison, Robert Ellis, and Mayme Kelso, and was released on January 27, 1919.

== Cast list ==
- May Allison as Helen Corning
- Robert Ellis as Brett Page
- Mayme Kelso as Mrs. Corning
- Rex Cherryman as Count Dronsky
- Jay Dwiggens as Judge Carroll
- George Berrell as Homer Brown
- Bull Montana as Hot Stove Kelly
