= Beloved (1934 film) =

1934 film by Victor Schertzinger

- Directed by: Victor Schertzinger
- Screenplay by: Paul Gangelin; George O'Neil
- Story by: Paul Gangelin
- Produced by: Carl Laemmle, Jr. B. F. Zeidman
- Starring: John Boles; Gloria Stuart; Morgan Farley; Ruth Hall; Albert Conti; Dorothy Peterson
- Cinematography: Howard Jackson; Victor Schertzinger
- Edited by: Merritt B. Gerstad
- Production company: Universal Pictures
- Distributed by: Universal Pictures
- Release date: January 22, 1934
- Running time: 85 minutes
- Country: United States
- Language: English

Beloved is a 1934 American pre-Code drama film directed by Victor Schertzinger and written by Paul Gangelin and George O'Neil. The film stars John Boles, Gloria Stuart, Morgan Farley, Ruth Hall, Albert Conti and Dorothy Peterson. The film was released on January 22, 1934, by Universal Pictures.

== Plot ==
An aristocratic violin prodigy, Carl Hausmann (Boles), escapes revolution in Vienna in 1848 and flees with his mother Irene (Peterson) to Charleston, North Carolina, where he is drawn to the music of the slaves. He meets a young woman, Lucy Tarrant (Stuart), whom he takes on as a piano student. The couple fall in love but Lucy's father, Major Tarrant (Breese) refuses his permission to marry. Carl emerges from the Civil War a hero, and in the meantime both Irene and Major Tarrant have died, and the Tarrants are now destitute,

Carl and Lucy marry and move to New York, where they survive on a meager income from Carl's piano lessons. Meanwhile, he dreams of writing a great "American Symphony". Needing more money he falls in with Judge B. T. Belden (Carle), an unscrupulous showman who exploits Carl's violin ability. Lucy convinces him that this is dangerous to his reputation as a serious musician. The couple moves into a boardinghouse run by Mrs. Briggs (La Verne), where Carl works on his compositions while Lucy supports them. Shamed by remarks about letting his wife support him, Carl gets a job playing piano in a saloon. Lucy becomes pregnant and gives birth to a boy, Charles.

Ten years later Carl is working as a piano and violin teacher, but is unable to interest Charles (Woods) in music. In order to earn extra money he reluctantly sells some of his songs to an advertising agent. Meanwhile, Charles gets a young woman, Helen Burroughs (Mercer), pregnant, and is forced by his father to marry her. In an attempt to redeem himself Charles enlists in the Spanish–American War, where he is killed. Helen dies giving birth to a son, Eric. Returning from World War I Eric (Farley) adapts Carl's beloved Negro Spirituals into Jazz, including the song My Beloved. He continues to plagiarize additional music, featured in stage hits sung by Patricia Sedley (Hall), whom Eric later marries.

Carl visits Eric's publisher, Mr. Yates (Clark) who insults him by calling his music a poor imitation of Eric's. Finally, Alexander Talbot (Shaw) of the "Metropolitan Symphony Society", encouraged by a donation from Eric, looks at Carl's American Symphony and, impressed, agrees to perform it. Reconciled, Eric and Carl attend the performance where Lucy's ghost smiles to hear her husband's work finally performed. During the performance Carl dies, happy that he has at last been recognized.

== Cast ==
- John Boles as Carl Hausmann
- Gloria Stuart as Lucy Tarrant Hausmann
- Morgan Farley as Eric Hausmann
- Ruth Hall as Patricia Sedley
- Albert Conti as Baron Franz von Hausmann
- Dorothy Peterson as Baroness Irene von Hausmann
- Edmund Breese as Maj. Tarrant
- Louise Carter as Mrs. Tarrant
- Anderson Lawler as Tom Rountree
- Richard Carle as Judge B. T. Belden
- Lucile Gleason as The Duchess
- Mae Busch as Marie
- Jimmy Butler Charles Hausmann, as a boy
- Eddie Woods as Charles Hausmann
- Oscar Apfel as Henry Burrows
- Jane Mercer as Helen
- Lester Lee as Carl, age 10
- Mickey Rooney as Tommy
- Holmes Herbert as Lord Landslake
- Lucille La Verne as Mrs. Briggs
- Mary Gordon as Mrs. O'Leary
- Wallis Clark as Yates
- Josef Swickard as Revolutionist
- James Flavin as Wilcox
- Bessie Barriscale as Mrs. Walkins
- Bobbe Arnst as The Dancer
- Fred Kelsey as Mulvaney
- Otto Hoffman as Dietrich
- George Ernest as Eric, as a Boy
- Cosmo Kyrle Bellew as Doctor
- King Baggot as Second Doctor
- Sherwood Bailey as Tom, as a Boy
- William H. Strauss as Jewish Father
- Neysa Nourse as Laurette
- Peggy Terry as Alice
- Clara Blandick as Miss Murfee
- Margaret Mann as Countess von Brandenburg
- C. Montague Shaw as Alexander Talbot
- Walter Brennan as Stuttering Boarder
