= Bondage (1933 film) =

1933 film

- Directed by: Alfred Santell
- Screenplay by: Arthur Kober; Doris Malloy
- Starring: Dorothy Jordan; Alexander Kirkland; Merle Tottenham; Nydia Westman; Jane Darwell; Edward Woods
- Cinematography: Lucien N. Andriot
- Edited by: Jack Murray
- Production company: Fox Film Corporation
- Distributed by: Fox Film Corporation
- Release date: March 31, 1933
- Running time: 67 minutes
- Country: United States
- Language: English

Bondage is a 1933 pre-Code American drama film directed by Alfred Santell and written by Arthur Kober and Doris Malloy. The film stars Dorothy Jordan, Alexander Kirkland, Merle Tottenham, Nydia Westman, Jane Darwell, and Edward Woods. The film was released on March 31, 1933, by Fox Film Corporation.

== Cast ==
- Dorothy Jordan as Judy Peters
- Alexander Kirkland as Dr. Nelson
- Merle Tottenham as Ruth
- Nydia Westman as Irma
- Jane Darwell as Mrs. Elizabeth Wharton
- Edward Woods as Earl Crawford
- Isabel Jewell as Beulah
- Dorothy Libaire as Maizie
- Rafaela Ottiano as Miss Trigge
