= The White Man's Law =

- Directed by: James Young
- Screenplay by: Marion Fairfax; John B. Browne
- Produced by: Jesse L. Lasky
- Starring: Sessue Hayakawa; Florence Vidor; Jack Holt; Herbert Standing; Mayme Kelso; Forrest Seabury
- Cinematography: Charles Rosher
- Production company: Famous Players–Lasky Corporation
- Distributed by: Paramount Pictures
- Release date: May 6, 1918
- Running time: 50 minutes
- Country: United States
- Language: Silent (English intertitles)

The White Man's Law is a surviving 1918 American silent drama film directed by James Young and written by Marion Fairfax and John B. Browne. The film stars Sessue Hayakawa, Florence Vidor, Jack Holt, Herbert Standing, Mayme Kelso, and Forrest Seabury. The film was released on May 6, 1918, by Paramount Pictures.

== Plot ==
As described in a film magazine, Sir Harry Falkland, having lost the respect of his wife and facing prosecution for forgery, leaves England and goes to Africa as part of an ivory commission. Maida Verne, a French-Sudanese maid, captivates his eye, and after he declares his love for her, she is compromised in the eyes of her fiancé John A. Genghis, the son of a sheik and an Oxford graduate. While on the trip to the interior in search of ivory, Genghis discovers Falkland's duplicity through a letter from his wife. In the fight that ensues Genghis is worsted and Falkland returns with a tale of the death of the young native. The impending arrival of Lady Falkland dispels Maida's dream of love and her demand for the restoration of her good name is met with indifference by Falkland. Genghis, who has miraculously escaped death, returns and after besting Falkland in a fight gives him permission to commit suicide. Falkland's death is reported to his wife as an accident and Genghis and Maida prepare for marriage.

== Cast ==
- Sessue Hayakawa as John A. Genghis
- Florence Vidor as Maida Verne
- Jack Holt as Sir Harry Falkland
- Herbert Standing as Sir Robert Hope
- Mayme Kelso as Mrs. Mayhew
- Forrest Seabury as Cpl. Verne
- Josef Swickard as Suliman Ghengis
- Ernest Joy as Sir Harry's Father
- Charles West as The Derelict
- Noah Beery as Dr. Robinson
- Frank Deshon as Falkland's Valet
- Clarissa Selwynne as Lady Falkland

== Preservation ==
A print is preserved in the Gosfilmofond Russian State Archive in Moscow.
