= They Never Come Back (film) =

1932 film

- Directed by: Fred C. Newmeyer
- Written by: Arthur Hoerl (continuity and dialogue); Sherman L. Lowe (continuity and dialogue)
- Produced by: Louis Weiss (producer)
- Starring: Regis Toomey
- Cinematography: James Diamond
- Edited by: Holbrook N. Todd
- Production company: Supreme Feature Films Company
- Distributed by: Weiss Brothers
- Release date: May 1, 1932
- Running time: 64 minutes
- Country: United States
- Language: English

They Never Come Back is a 1932 American pre-Code drama film directed by Fred C. Newmeyer and starring Regis Toomey and Dorothy Sebastian.

In the film, a boxer is framed for theft and imprisoned. Following his release, he has a fistfight with the man who framed him.

== Plot ==
Distracted just before the fight by the news that his mother has died, boxer Jimmy Nolan is defeated in the ring. As he and his sister Mary attend the funeral, Jimmy also deals with an injured arm from the fight.

At a nightclub Jerry Filmore owns, Jimmy meets dancer Adele, who is Filmore's romantic interest as well. A ticket taker at the door, Ralph Landon, takes $500 from the till and plants it on Jimmy, framing him. Jimmy goes to jail.

Ralph falls in love with Mary and confides to her that he owed $1,000 to Filmore and set up her brother on his behalf. Jimmy gets out of jail, accepts a fight and wins a $1,000 prize, settling Ralph's account with Filmore. It leads to a fistfight between the two men. Jimmy wins that one as well.

== Cast ==
- Regis Toomey as Jimmy Nolan
- Dorothy Sebastian as Adele Landon
- Edward Woods as Ralph Landon
- Greta Granstedt as Mary Nolan
- Earle Foxe as Jerry Filmore
- Gertrude Astor as Kate
- James J. Jeffries as First Referee
- George Byron as Eddie Donovan
- Jack Richardson as Hank Bates

== See also ==
- List of boxing films
