= The Mystery Girl =

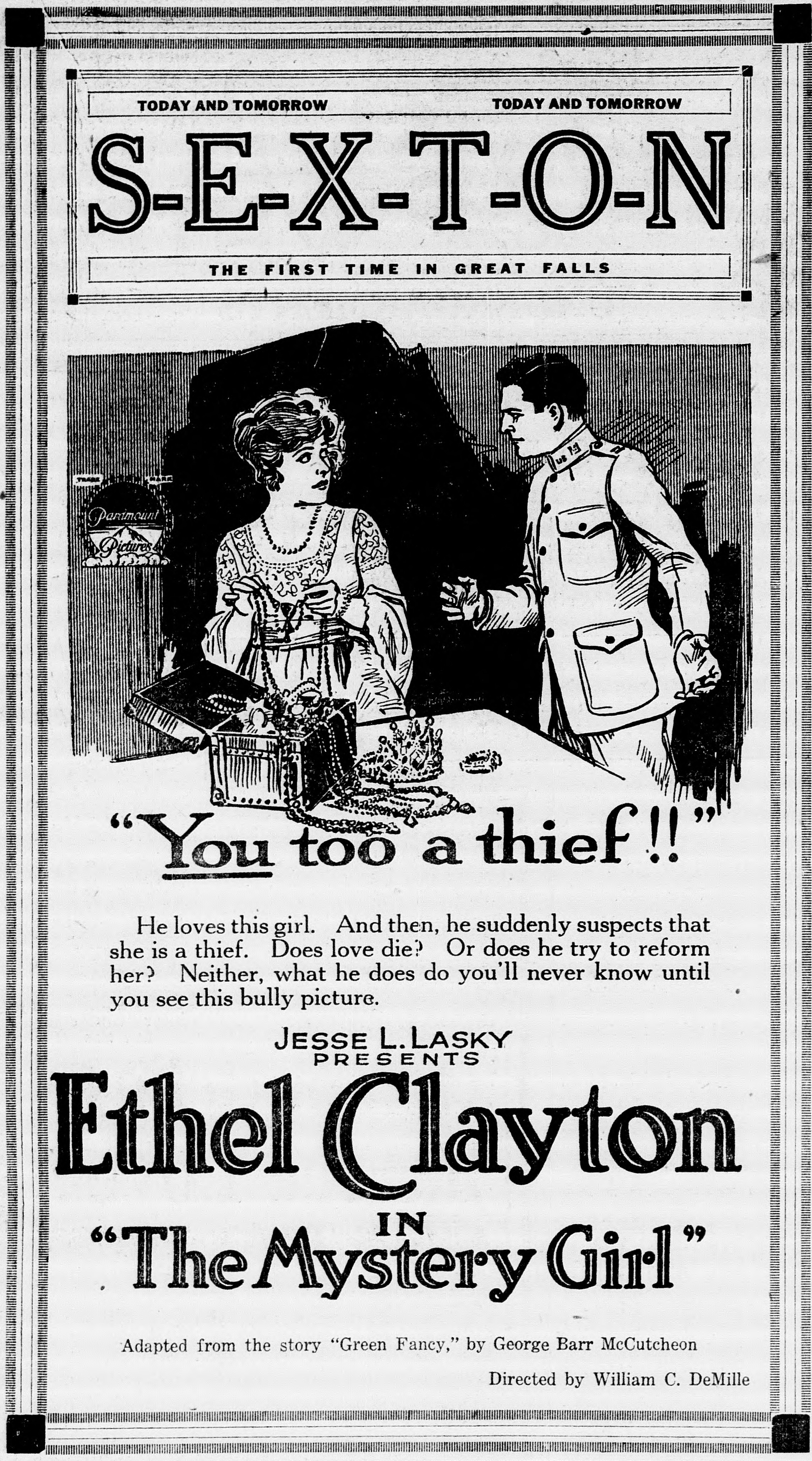
- Newspaper advertisement
- Directed by: William C. deMille
- Screenplay by: Marion Fairfax
- Based on: Green Fancy (novel) by George Barr McCutcheon
- Produced by: Jesse L. Lasky
- Starring: Ethel Clayton; Henry Woodward; Clarence Burton; Charles West; Winter Hall; Mayme Kelso
- Cinematography: Charles Edgar Schoenbaum
- Production company: Famous Players–Lasky Corporation
- Distributed by: Paramount Pictures
- Release date: December 22, 1918
- Running time: 50 minutes
- Country: United States
- Language: English

The Mystery Girl is a lost 1918 American drama silent film directed by William C. deMille and written by Marion Fairfax and George Barr McCutcheon. The film stars Ethel Clayton, Henry Woodward, Clarence Burton, Charles West, Winter Hall and Mayme Kelso. The film was released on December 22, 1918, by Paramount Pictures.

== Cast ==
- Ethel Clayton as Countess Therese
- Henry Woodward as Capt. Thomas K. Barnes
- Clarence Burton as Prince Ugo
- Charles West as Chester Naismith
- Winter Hall as Prince Sebasatian
- Mayme Kelso as Merecedes Thackery
- J. Parks Jones as Ferdust
