= Badge of Honor (1934 film) =

1934 film

- Directed by: Spencer Gordon Bennet
- Written by: George Morgan; Robert Emmett Tansey
- Produced by: Lester F. Scott Jr.
- Starring: Buster Crabbe; Ruth Hall; Betty Blythe
- Cinematography: James S. Brown Jr.
- Edited by: Fred Bain
- Production company: Lester F. Scott Productions
- Distributed by: Mayfair Pictures
- Release date: April 1, 1934
- Running time: 68 minutes
- Country: United States
- Language: English

Badge of Honor is a 1934 American drama film directed by Spencer Gordon Bennet and starring Buster Crabbe, Ruth Hall and Betty Blythe. It was produced on Poverty Row as a second feature for distribution by Mayfair Pictures. Crabbe was loaned out from Paramount Pictures for the production. The film's sets were designed by the art director Paul Palmentola.

== Plot ==
Reporter Bob Gordon is hired by the owner of a newspaper to try and rescue it from deliberate attempts at sabotage driven by a rival acting in league with the paper's own editor.

== Cast ==
- Buster Crabbe as Bob Gordon
- Ruth Hall as Helen Brewster
- Ralph Lewis as Randall Brewster
- Betty Blythe as Mrs. Claire van Alstyne
- John Trent as Harvey Larkin, City Editor
- Ernie Adams as 'Tip' Crane
- Allan Cavan as Preston, the Lawyer
- Charles McAvoy as 'Trim' Fuller
- Broderick O'Farrell as Howard Kent
- William Arnold as Andrew Comstock

== Bibliography ==
- Pitts, Michael R. Poverty Row Studios, 1929–1940: An Illustrated History of 55 Independent Film Companies, with a Filmography for Each. McFarland & Company, 2005.
