= The Drums of Jeopardy (1923 film) =

1923 film by Edward Dillon

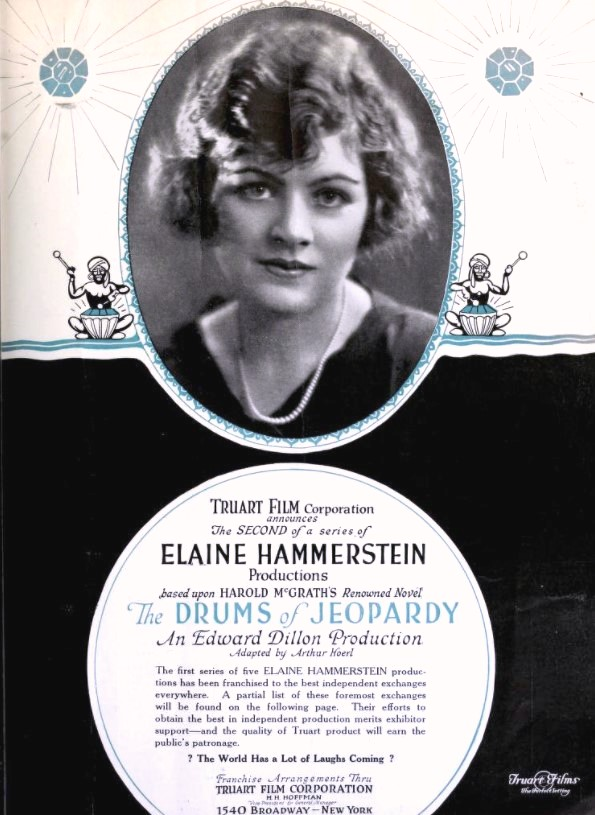
- Advertisement
- Directed by: Edward Dillon
- Written by: Alfred A. Cohn (titles); Arthur Hoerl (writer); A. Carle Palm (titles)
- Based on: The Drums of Jeopardy by Harold McGrath
- Produced by: M.H. Hoffman (producer)
- Starring: Elaine Hammerstein; Wallace Beery
- Cinematography: James Diamond
- Edited by: Alfred A. Cohn; A. Carle Palm
- Production company: M.H. Hoffman Inc.
- Distributed by: Truart Film
- Release date: November 1923
- Running time: 70 minutes
- Country: United States
- Language: Silent (English intertitles)

The Drums of Jeopardy is a 1923 American silent mystery film directed by Edward Dillon, written by Arthur Hoerl and featuring Wallace Beery. It is based on the 1920 novel of the same name by Harold McGrath which was serialized in the Saturday Evening Post. The film was released by Tru-art Film Company in November 1923. The name of the villain in the story was originally called Boris Karlov, but when the actor Boris Karloff rose to prominence circa 1923, the character's name was changed to Gregor Karlov to avoid confusion. It was changed back to Boris again in the 1931 remake of the film which starred Warner Oland as the villain.

Producer M. H. Hoffman rose to prominence in Hollywood as a result of this film's success. He later became president of Tiffany Pictures, and founded Allied Pictures in 1931. Actress Elaine Hammerstein (the daughter of Arthur Hammerstein) also starred in the 1915 film version of The Moonstone, but her career declined after the end of the silent film era. She and her politician husband were killed in a car accident in Mexico in 1948.

== Plot ==
As described in a film magazine review, Jerome Hawksley, confidential secretary to Grand Duke Alexis of Russia, is bequeathed upon the death of the Duke during the Russian Revolution two jewels known as the "Drums of Jeopardy." Because the jewels are of great value and believed to possess a supernatural power, Gregor Karlov attempts to secure them. The jewels are sent to the United States with a trusted friend and given to Banker Burrows for safekeeping. Gregor, in an attempt to steal the jewels, kills the banker and kidnaps Jerome. Dorothy Burrows teams with Cutty, a secret service man, and are determined to bring the culprit to justice. Gregor is traced to Little Russia, a café in New York City, and is killed during a fight. Jerome and Dorothy agree to marry and the jewels are returned to him.

== Cast ==
- Elaine Hammerstein as Dorothy Burrows
- Jack Mulhall as Jerome Hawksley
- Wallace Beery as Gregor Karlov
- David Torrence as Cutty
- Maude George as Olga Andrevich
- Eric Mayne as Banker Burrows
- Forrest Seabury as Stefani

== Preservation ==
A copy of The Drums of Jeopardy is housed at the Library of Congress.
