= A Woman Scorned (1911 film) =

1911 film directed by D. W. Griffith

- Directed by: D. W. Griffith
- Written by: George Hennessy
- Starring: Blanche Sweet
- Cinematography: G. W. Bitzer
- Distributed by: Biograph Company
- Release date: October 30, 1911
- Running time: 18 minutes
- Country: United States
- Language: Silent (English intertitles)

A Woman Scorned is a 1911 American short silent drama film directed by D. W. Griffith and starring Blanche Sweet.

== Cast ==
- Wilfred Lucas as The Doctor
- Claire McDowell as The Doctor's Wife
- Alfred Paget as The Sneak Thief's Companion
- Frank Evans as A Policeman
- Adolph Lestina
- Charles Hill Mailes as A Policeman
- Vivian Prescott
- Blanche Sweet
