= The Drums of Jeopardy (1931 film) =

1931 film

- Theatrical release poster
- Directed by: George B. Seitz
- Written by: Florence Ryerson
- Based on: The Drums of Jeopardy by Harold McGrath
- Produced by: Phil Goldstone
- Starring: Warner Oland; June Collyer; Lloyd Hughes
- Cinematography: Arthur Reed
- Edited by: Otto Ludwig
- Music by: Val Burton
- Production company: Tiffany Pictures
- Distributed by: Tiffany Pictures
- Release date: March 2, 1931
- Running time: 75 minutes
- Country: United States
- Language: English

The Drums of Jeopardy is a 1931 American pre-Code horror film directed by George B. Seitz and starring Warner Oland, June Collyer and Lloyd Hughes. It is the second film adaptation of Harold McGrath's novel of the same name, and stars Oland as Dr. Boris Karlov.

The name of the villain in the novel was originally called Boris Karlov, but when the actor Boris Karloff rose to prominence circa 1923, the character's name was changed to Gregor Karlov in the 1923 silent film adaptation to avoid confusion. It was changed back to Boris again in this 1931 remake of the film. The film's was produced by Tiffany Pictures, one of the leading independent studios in Hollywood. The sets were designed by the art director Fay Babcock.

== Plot ==
In the Russian Empire, the nobleman Prince Gregor Petroff seduces chemist Boris Karlov's daughter Anya, who then commits suicide after becoming pregnant. After discovering Anya's body with the Drums of Jeopardy, a necklace owned by the Petroff family, Karlov vows revenge against them.

Dr. Karlov develops a poison gas to kill the Petroffs. After the Russian Revolution, Karlov joins the Bolsheviks and kills a general from the family. The rest of the family is evacuated to New York City by the U.S. Secret Service.

Karlov follows the Petroffs to America and corners them at a safe house in New Jersey. Although Gregor blames Nicholas, Karlov kills him and tries to take revenge by forcing Nicholas to murder his love interest Kitty Conover. They are rescued by the police, and Dr. Karlov is killed by his own gas.

== Cast ==
- Warner Oland as Dr. Boris Karlov
- June Collyer as Kitty Conover
- Lloyd Hughes as Prince Nicholas Petroff
- Clara Blandick as Abbie Krantz
- Hale Hamilton as Martin Kent
- Wallace MacDonald as Prince Gregor Petroff
- George Fawcett as General Petroff
- Florence Lake as Anya Karlov
- Mischa Auer as Peter
- Ernest Hilliard as Prince Ivan Petroff
- Broderick O'Farrell as Dr. Brett
- Ann Brody as Taisya
- Murdock MacQuarrie as Stephen, the Butler
- Julia Swayne Gordon as Banquet Guest
- Ruth Hall as Banquet Guest
- Robert Homans as Detective

== Release ==
The film was first released on DVD on August 31, 2004.

== Reception ==
On his website Fantastic Movie Musings and Ramblings, Dave Sindelar called it, "a very interesting variation on the typical horror revenge plot". Dennis Schwartz from Ozus' World Movie Reviews awarded the film an "A−". In his review he wrote, "Despite the poor quality of its print, this PRC film reaches greatness in its portrayal of villainy and is worth watching despite the film's bad shape."
