= Mark Griep =

Chemistry professor

Mark Griep (born 1959) is a chemistry professor at the University of Nebraska–Lincoln. He has a bachelor’s and doctorate in biochemistry from the University of Minnesota. He studies the enzymes primase and DnaB helicase in his search for antibiotics that inhibit them. He is co-author with Marjorie Mikasen of the nonfiction book ReAction! Chemistry in the Movies.

== Biochemist ==
Griep studies the proteins that synthesize DNA, namely primase and DnaB helicase. Of these, most of his work concerns primase, the enzyme that initiates DNA synthesis during DNA replication. His goal is to discover the next generation of antibiotics by searching for inhibitors of bacterial primase. To help him do this, he seeks to understand the structure and function of primase from many bacteria.

For his science outreach efforts, he studies the chemistry found in feature films and then communicates his findings to the other chemists and the public. In recognition of this work, he was awarded a Distinguished Teaching Award from the University of Nebraska–Lincoln.

== Author ==
Griep is the coauthor with artist Marjorie Mikasen of the nonfiction book ReAction! Chemistry in the Movies (2009 Oxford University Press). It gives the perspectives of a scientist and artist on the dark and bright sides of chemistry found in over 110 films. He and Mikasen were awarded an Alfred P. Sloan Foundation Fellowship in the area of Public Understanding of Science to research and write the book. The appendix describes ways to use movies or movie clips in the chemistry classroom.

Griep also contributed 10 movie boxes to the chemistry textbook "The World of Chemistry". His innovative entries relate in-chapter chemistry concepts to eight contemporary and two classic films. Word problems are included in each movie box for possible student assignments.
