= Harold MacGrath =

American novelist, screenwriter

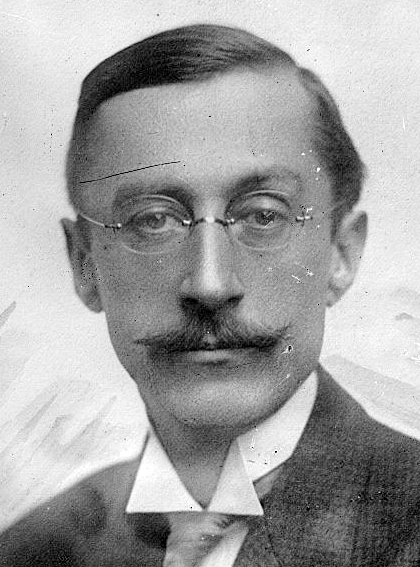
- Born: September 4, 1871; Syracuse, New York, United States
- Died: October 30, 1932 (aged 61); Syracuse, New York, United States
- Occupations: Novelist; short story writer; screenwriter; journalist
- Writing career
- Language: English
- Genres: Fiction, short story, screenwriting, journalism

Harold MacGrath (September 4, 1871 – October 30, 1932) was a bestselling and prolific American novelist, short story writer, and screenwriter. He sometimes completed more than one novel per year for the mass market, covering romance, spies, mystery, and adventure.

He was the first nationally known writer to be commissioned to write original screenplays for the new film industry. In addition, he had eighteen novels and three short stories adapted as films, in some cases more than once. Three of these novels were also adapted as plays that were produced on Broadway in New York City. MacGrath traveled extensively but was always based in Syracuse, New York, where he was born and raised.

== Biography ==
Born Harold McGrath in Syracuse, New York, he was the son of Thomas H. and Lillian Jane McGrath. As a young man, he worked as a reporter and columnist for the Syracuse Herald newspaper until the late 1890s, when he published his first novel, a romance titled Arms and the Woman. According to the New York Times, his next book, The Puppet Crown, was the No.7 bestselling book in the United States for all of 1901.

MacGrath (as he spelled his name then) continued to write novels for the mass market about love, adventure, mystery, spies, and the like at an average rate of more than one a year. He had three more books that were among the top ten bestselling books of the year. At the same time, he published a number of short stories in such major American magazines as The Saturday Evening Post, Ladies Home Journal, and Red Book magazine. Several of MacGrath's novels were also serialized in these magazines. He continued to have short stories published in such venues until his death in 1932.

=== Writing for films ===
In 1912, Harold MacGrath became one of the first nationally known authors to write directly for the movies when he was hired by the American Film Company to create an original screenplay for a short film in the Western genre, titled The Vengeance That Failed.

MacGrath's work was so popular that eighteen of his forty novels and three of his short stories were adapted as films. Some of the novels received more than one film adaptation. He also wrote the original screenplays for another four movies. His serial film The Adventures of Kathlyn (1903) featured Kathlyn Williams. While writing the screenplays for the thirteen episodes of the serial, he also wrote the related novel. It was published immediately after the December 29, 1913, premiere of the first episode of the serial. The book was available for sale in book stores during the screening of the entire thirteen episodes, capitalizing on the publicity.

Three of his books adapted for film were also adapted as Broadway plays.

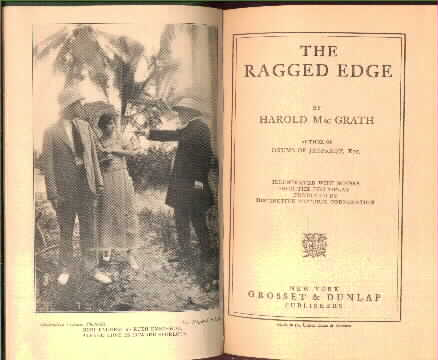

The Douglas Fairbanks Production Company made a feature-length adventure film, The Mollycoddle (1920), based on MacGrath's short story of the same title. It had been published in 1913 by The Saturday Evening Post. Directed by Victor Fleming, the film featured Douglas Fairbanks, Ruth Renick, and Wallace Beery; it was distributed by the newly created company United Artists.

The young Boris Karloff, who had a few uncredited movie roles, was said to have chosen that stage name in 1920 for his first screen credit from MacGrath's novel The Drums of Jeopardy. Published by The Saturday Evening Post in January 1920, it had featured a Russian mad scientist character named Boris Karlov. MacGrath's book was adapted as a Broadway play, titled Boris Karlov (1922). Because by 1923 actor Boris Karloff was using a similar name, when the film adaptation of The Drum of Jeopardy was released, the scientist character was named Gregor Karlov.

=== Success ===
Harold MacGrath became a wealthy man because of his success as a writer. He traveled extensively internationally, but was based in Syracuse, New York. There he commissioned design and construction in 1912 of an English country-style mansion and associated landscaped gardens. These were highly regarded.

In "The Short Autobiography of a Deaf Man", an essay published in The Saturday Evening Post (23 April 1932), MacGrath wrote about having struggled early in life as a result of a hearing impairment. At a time when deaf people were often considered as lacking intellectual acuity because of difficulty in communications, MacGrath had concealed this condition from his employer and others. Harold MacGrath died at his home in Syracuse a few months after publishing this article.

== Funeral ==
MacGrath died in 1932. His coffin was held for viewing in St. Paul's Episcopal Church in Syracuse, before a 2 p.m. funeral service on November 5, 1932. Hundreds of people came to pass by the bier. Rev. Dr. Henry H. Hadley, rector of St. Paul's, officiated at the church service.

== Bibliography ==
Novels (and year made into film)

- Arms and the Woman (1899)
- The Puppet Crown (1901) - (1915 film of same name)
- The Grey Cloak (1903)
- The Man on the Box (1904) - (1906 Broadway play, 1914 film & 1925 film)
- Hearts and Masks (1905) - (1914 short film, 1921 film & 1915 Broadway play titled Three of Hearts)
- The Princess Elopes (1905)
- Enchantment (1905)
- Half a Rogue (1906) - (1916 film)
- The Best Man (1907)
- The Lure of the Mask (1908) - (1915 film)
- The Enchanted Hat (1908)
- The Goose Girl (1909) - (1915 film)
- A Splendid Hazard (1910) - (1920 film)
- The Carpet from Bagdad (1911) - (1915 film)
- The Place of Honeymoons (1912) - (1920 film)
- Deuces Wild (1913)
- Parrot and Company (1913) - (1921 film titled Not Guilty)
- Pidgin Island (1914) - (1916 film)
- The Adventures of Kathlyn (1914) - (1913 film serial & 1916 feature-length film)
- The Million Dollar Mystery (1915) - (1914 film serial & 1927 film)
- The Voice in the Fog (1915) - (1916 film)
- The Luck of the Irish (1917) - (1920 film)
- The Girl in His House (1918) - (1918 film)
- The Private Wire to Washington (1919)
- The Yellow Typhoon (1919) - (1920 film)
- The Drums of Jeopardy (1920) - (1922 Broadway play, 1923 film & 1931 film)
- The Man with Three Names (1920)
- The Pagan Madonna (1921)
- The Ragged Edge (1922) - (1923 film)
- Captain Wardlaw's Kitbags (1923)
- The World Outside (1923)
- The Green Stone (1924)
- The Cellini Plaque (1925)
- The Retreat From Utopia (1926)
- The Sporting Spinster (1926)
- We All Live Through It (1927)
- The Changing Road (1928)
- The Wolves of Chaos (1929)
- The Blue Rajah Murder (1930)
- The Green Complex (1930)
- The Other Passport (1931)

Other film writings

- The Vengeance That Failed (1912)
- Madam Who (1918) (story)
- The Mollycoddle (1920) (story)
- Pleasures of the Rich (1926) (based on his story "The Wrong Coat")
- Womanpower (1926) (based on his story "You Can't Always Tell")
- Bitter Apples (1927) (story)
- Danger Street (1928) (based on his story "The Beautiful Bullet")

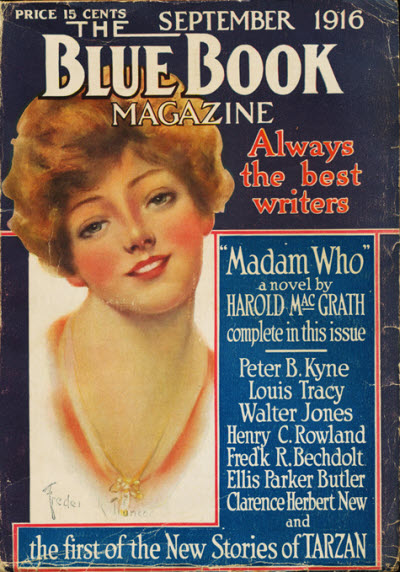
MacGrath's novella "Madame Who" was the lead story in Blue Book in September 1916

Short stories (not including those made into films)

- "A Night's Enchantment" (1904)
- "No Cinderella" (1904)
- "Two Candidates" (1904)
- "The Mollycoddle" (1913)
- "Madame Who" (1916)
- "The Millionaire Burglar" (1917)
- "The Bach Chaconne" (1932)

Serialized stories (not including those made into films)

- The Changing Road (1927)
- Impromptu (1929)
