= Forrest Seabury =

American actor

Forrest Seabury (1876 - 1944) was an actor in theater and silent films.

He was named Sumner Forrest Seabury by his parents. His father, also named Forrest Seabury, was a scenic artist who died in 1895. They descended from the Bishop of Connecticut.

In 1914 he was in the theatrical production The Governor's Boss.

He was the father of Ynez Seabury, who also became an actress.

== Filmography ==
- Wild and Woolly (1917) as Banker
- The White Man's Law (1918) as Cpl. Verne
- The Honor of His House (1918) as Mr. Proudweather
- Such a Little Pirate (1918) as Ellory Glendenning
- The Secret Garden as Indian Servant
- The Drums of Jeopardy (1923) as Stefani
- The Auction Block (1926) as Edward Blake
- Ranson's Folly (1926 film) as Drummer
