= Nebraska Arts Council =

The Nebraska Arts Council is a state agency that seeks to promote, cultivate and sustain the arts in Nebraska. The organization in its present form was established in 1974, and is funded by the state of Nebraska, the National Endowment for the Arts, and the Nebraska Cultural Endowment. The group connects artists, organizations, schools and community groups, and sponsors grants funding performances and educational activities. It is related to the Mid-America Arts Alliance.

The Nebraska Arts Council has 15 members, appointed by the governor, and has had more than 40 community art centers.
