= Lionel Barrymore on stage, screen and radio =

Performances by the American actor

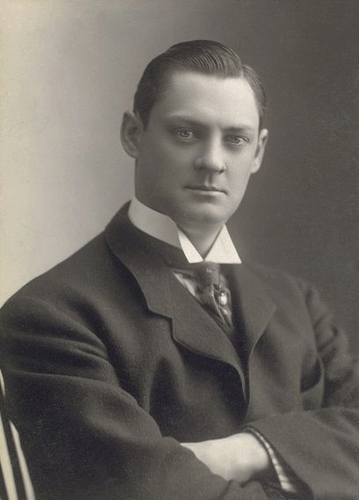
Barrymore in the 1910s

Lionel Barrymore (born Lionel Herbert Blythe; 1878–1954) was an American actor of stage, screen, and radio. He also directed several films, wrote scripts, created etchings, sketches, and composed music. He was the eldest child of the actors Maurice Barrymore and Georgie Drew Barrymore, and his two siblings were John and Ethel; these and other family members were part of an acting dynasty. Reluctant to follow his parents' career, Barrymore appeared together with his grandmother Louisa Lane Drew in a stage production of The Rivals at the age of 15. He soon found success on stage in character roles. Although he took a break from acting in 1906–1909 to train in Paris as a painter, he was not successful as an artist, and returned to the US and acting. He also joined his family troupe, from 1910, in their vaudeville act.

Barrymore began his film career in 1911, appearing in numerous silent films, many of which have subsequently been lost. In 1911, he signed a contract with the Biograph Company and appeared as a character actor in short films, many of them directed by D. W. Griffith, before moving into feature-length productions in 1914. He began writing scripts and directing films shortly afterwards, and for the next five years, he did not act on the legitimate stage. Although he had several successes on Broadway after the First World War, he encountered strongly negative criticism in a 1921 production of Macbeth, and in three productions in a row in 1925. Afterwards, he never again appeared on the New York stage. In 1925, he signed a contract with Metro-Goldwyn-Mayer, where he became a close friend of Louis B. Mayer, for whom he made numerous films. He directed several films from 1929 to 1931, but concentrated on acting afterwards.

Barrymore became well known in curmudgeonly roles. In 1938, he broke his hip, and, aggravated by arthritis, he lived the remainder of his life in a wheelchair. Mayer made sure that roles were found or written to accommodate Barrymore, who continued to act in films until 1953. During that time, he appeared as Dr. Gillespie in the popular Dr. Kildare film series, with Lew Ayres in the title role, and as Mr. Potter in It's a Wonderful Life—a role that was highly placed on the American Film Institute's list of the 100 Heroes and Villains in a film that the critic Philip French described as "a complex inspirational work". Beginning in the 1930s, Barrymore increasingly worked in radio, initially as Ebenezer Scrooge in Charles Dickens's A Christmas Carol, which was broadcast annually from 1934 to 1953, then in Mayor of the Town, beginning in 1942, and also in a radio series spun off from the Dr. Kildare films (playing the same character that he had played in the films), among others.

Two of the films in which Barrymore appeared—Grand Hotel (1932), and You Can't Take It with You (1938)—won the Academy Award for Best Picture. He was considered for the Academy Award for Best Director for his 1929 film, Madame X, (Note: The "consideration" in the early ceremonies is not classed by the Academy of Motion Picture Arts and Sciences as an official nomination. The Academy states that, "Though not official nominations, the additional names in each category, according to in-house records, were under consideration by the various boards of judges.") and won the Best Actor award for his performance in A Free Soul (1931). He was inducted to the Hollywood Walk of Fame on February 8, 1960, and is, along with his two siblings, included in the American Theater Hall of Fame.

== Stage appearances ==
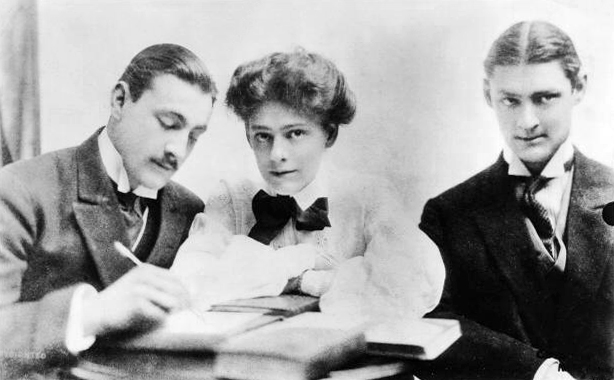
Barrymore (right), with his siblings John and Ethel, 1904 (Note: The film critic Hollis Alpert, in his 1964 biography on the Barrymores, opines that this is two images blended as one, as the trio were seldom photographed together early in their careers.)

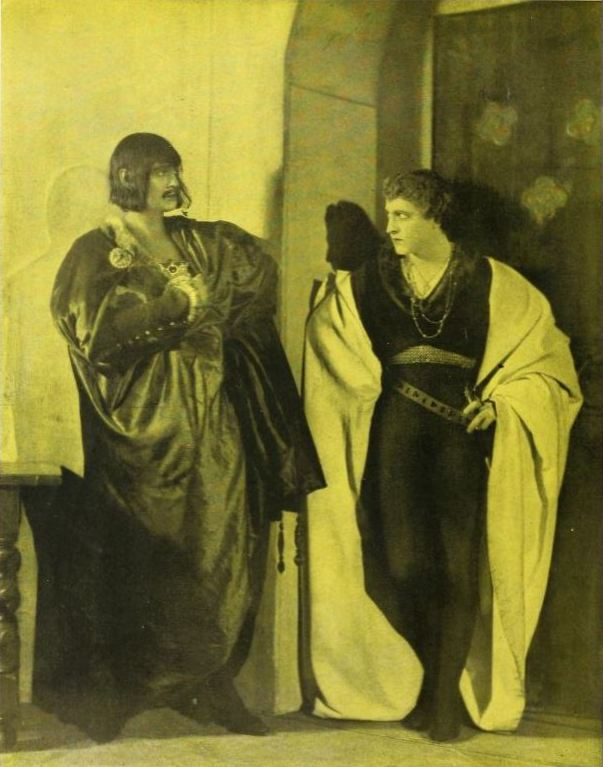
Barrymore (left) with his brother John in The Jest, September 1919

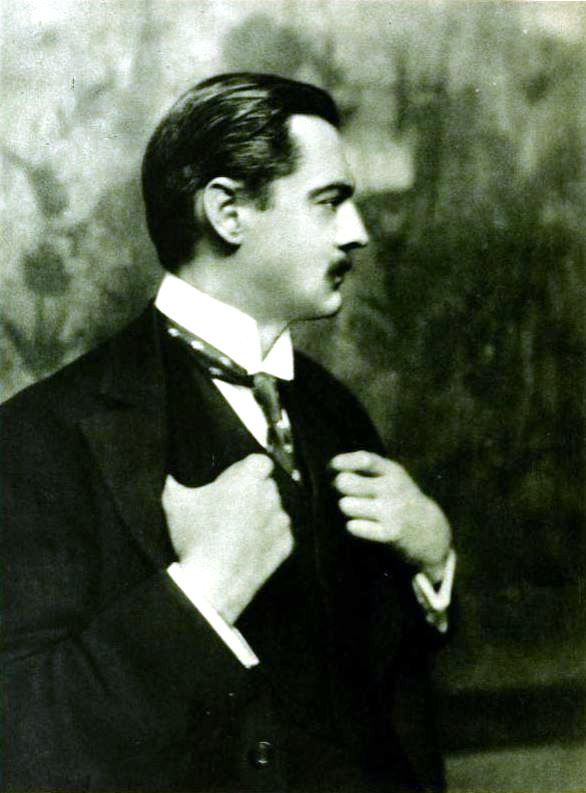
Barrymore in July 1921

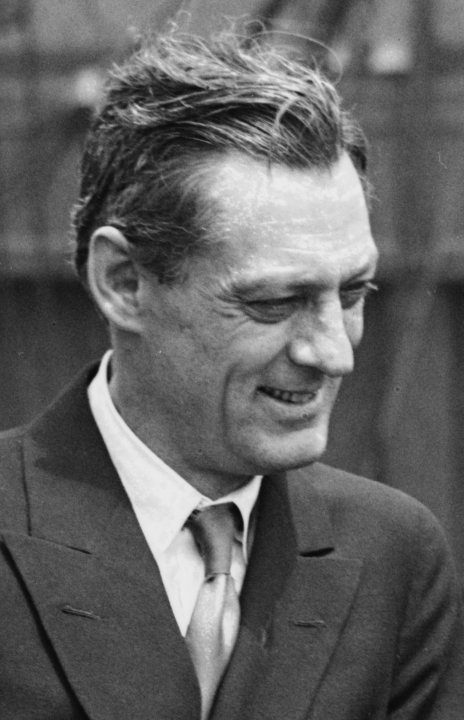
Barrymore in 1923

Barrymore's stage appearances
Production	Date	Theatre (New York City, unless stated)	Role	Notes
The Rivals	November 28, 1893	The Auditorium, Kansas City		Billed as Lional Barrymore
The Road to Ruin	January 15, 1894	Star Theatre	Footman	
The Bachelor's Baby	October 21, 1895	Park Theatre, Boston	Sgt. Jones	Subsequently, at the Star Theatre, Buffalo, from January 12, 1897.
Mary Pennington, Spinster	October 12, 1896	Palmer's Theatre	Watson	
Squire Kate	October 26, 1896	Palmer's Theatre	Lord Silversnake	
Cumberland '61	October 18, 1897	14th Street Theatre	Adolfus Drayton Lenox	
A Wife's Peril	1898	Minneapolis–Saint Paul		
Magda	1898	Minneapolis–Saint Paul		
Oliver Twist	1898	Minneapolis–Saint Paul		
East Lynne	1898	Minneapolis–Saint Paul		
Camille	1898	Minneapolis–Saint Paul		
Uncle Dick	October 6, 1898	Star Theatre, Buffalo	Lawrence Sherman	
Honorable John Rigsby	November 28, 1898	New National Theatre, Washington	Harold Marson	Subsequently, at the Powers' Theatre, Chicago from January 23, 1899, for two weeks.
Arizona	February 11, 1900	Chicago Grand Opera House, Chicago	Sgt. Kellar	
Rain Clouds	1900	Albany, New York		
The Rivals	1900	Albany, New York		
An Arabian Night	1900	Albany, New York		
Sag Harbor	September 27, 1900 – December 1900	Republic Theatre	Frank Turner	Ran for 76 performances
Brixton Burglary	May 20, 1901 – July 8, 1901	Herald Square Theatre		Ran for 48 performances
The Second in Command	September 2, 1901 – December 1901	Empire Theatre		Ran for 128 performances
The Mummy and the Hummingbird	September 4, 1902 – November 1902 and April 1903 – ?	Empire Theatre	Giuseppe	Ran for 85 performances in 1902 and then a second run in 1903
The Best of Friends	October 19, 1903 – December 1903	Academy of Music	Kid Garvey	Ran for 65 performances
The Other Girl	December 29, 1903 – May 1904	Criterion Theatre	Mr. Sheldon	Ran for 160 performances, transferring to the Empire Theatre on January 25, 1904, and then to the Lyceum Theatre on May 2, 1904
Pantaloon/Alice Sit-by-the-Fire	December 25, 1905 – March 1906	Criterion Theatre	Pantaloon	Ran for 81 performances; double bill with his siblings
The Fires of Fate	December 6, 1909	Illinois Theatre, Chicago	Abdulla	Barrymore left the production at the end of December
The Jail Bird	January 31, 1910	Victoria Theater		
The White Slaver	February 22, 1910	Majestic Theatre, Chicago	Italian laborer	Written by Barrymore; co-starred first wife Doris Rankin
Bob Acres	September 11, 1911	Brooklyn	Sir Lucius O'Trigger	
Stalled	1912			
The Still Voice	March 26, 1912	Cincinnati		
Peter Ibbetson	April 17, 1917 – June 1917	Republic Theatre	Colonel Ibbetson	Ran for 71 performances; with John Barrymore
The Copperhead	February 18, 1918 – June 1918	Shubert Theatre	Milt Shanks	Ran for 120 performances
The Jest	April 9, 1919 – February 28, 1920	Plymouth Theatre	Neri Chiaramantesi	Ran for 77 performances and then another 179 performances after a summer break; adapted play with E. Sheldon and John Barrymore (co-star)
The Letter of the Law	February 23, 1920 – July 1920	Criterion Theatre	Mouzon	Ran for 89 performances
Macbeth	February 17, 1921 –March 1921	Apollo Theatre	Macbeth	Ran for 28 performances
The Claw	October 17, 1921 – January 1922	Broadhurst Theatre	Achille Cortelon	Ran for 115 performances; co-starred Doris Rankin and Irene Fenwick (second wife)
Laugh, Clown, Laugh	November 28, 1923 – March 1924	Belasco Theatre	Tito Beppi, Flik	Ran for 133 performances
The Piker	January 15, 1925 – February 1925	Eltinge Theatre	Bernie Kaplan	Ran for 44 performances
Taps	April 14, 1925 – May 1925	Broadhurst Theatre	Sergeant Volkhardt	Ran for 32 performances
Man or Devil	May 21, 1925 – June 1925	Broadhurst Theatre	Nicholas Snyders	Ran for 20 performances

== Filmography ==
=== As actor ===
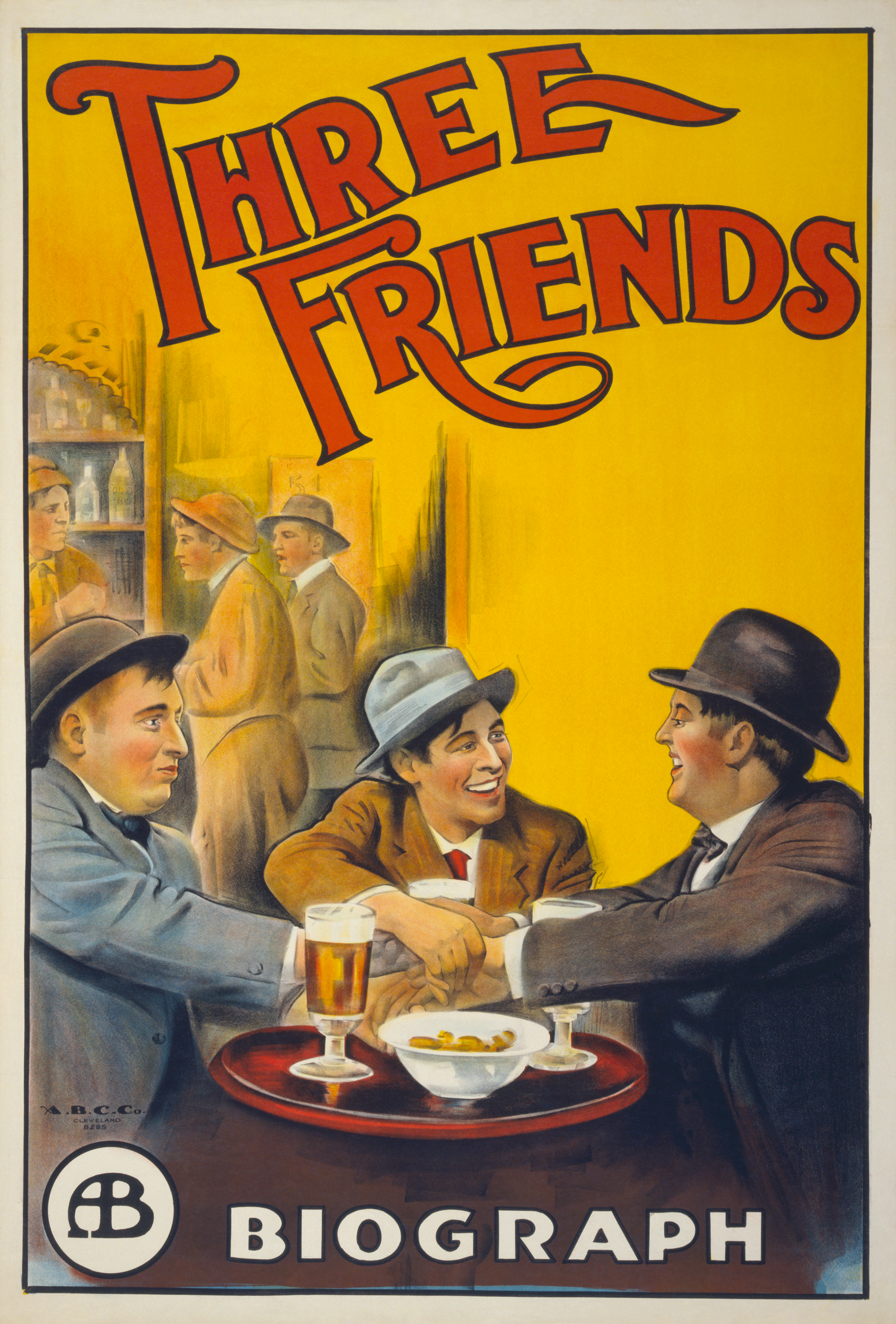
Poster for Three Friends, 1913

The Wanderer, 1913

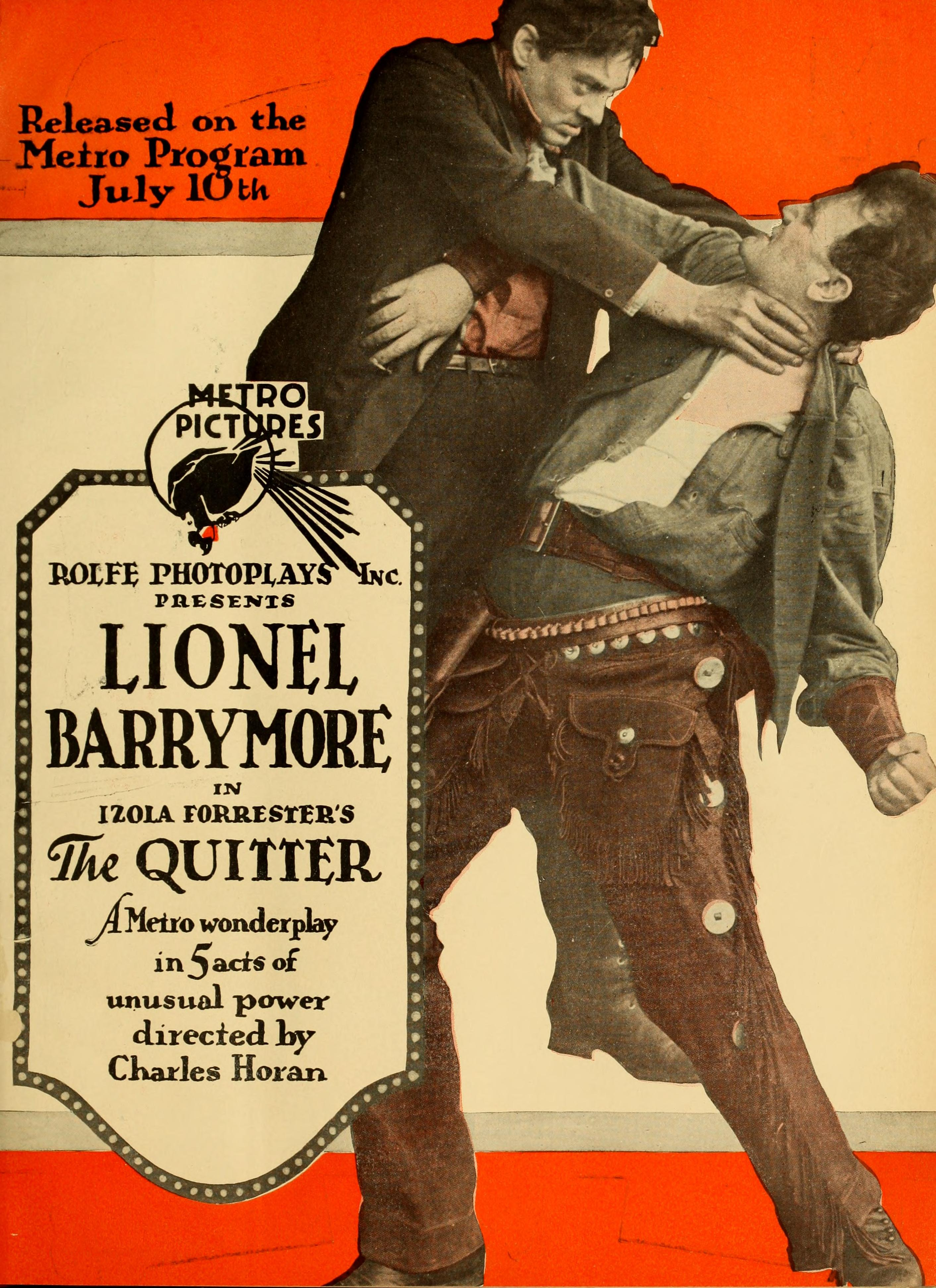
Ad for The Quitter, 1916

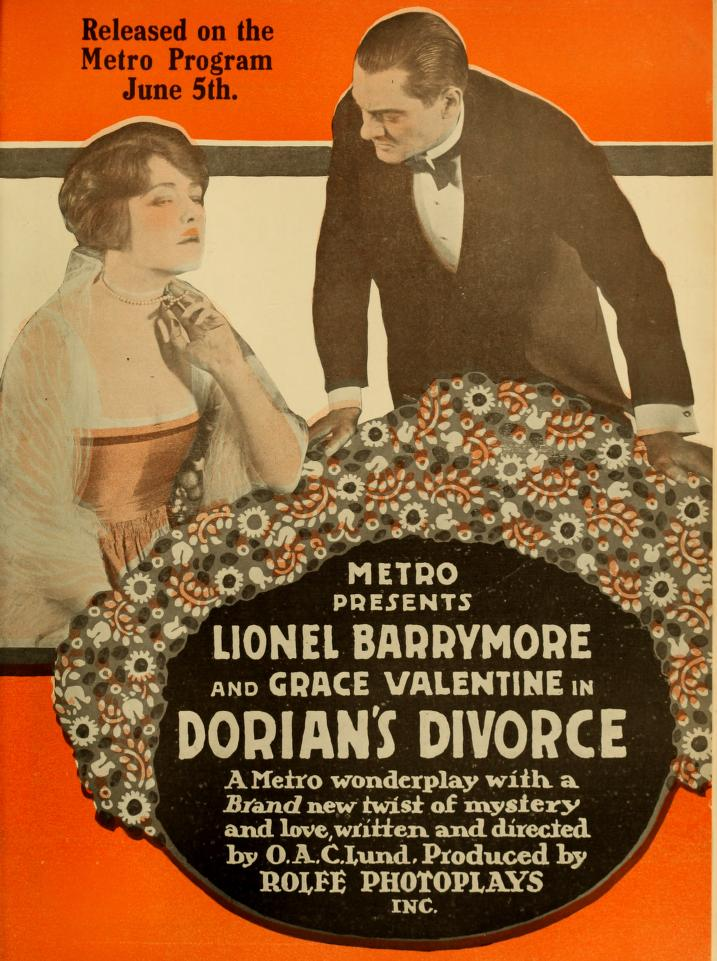
Ad for Dorian's Divorce, 1916

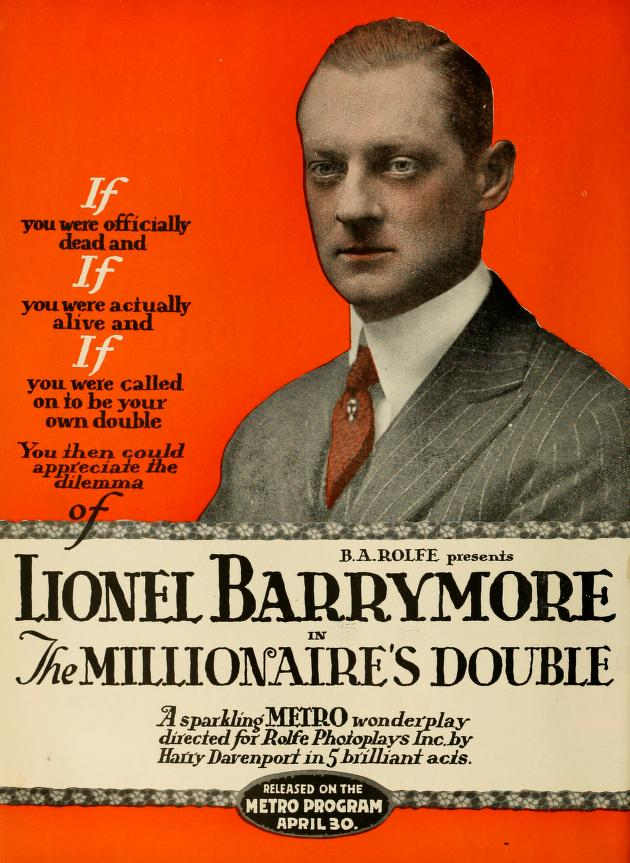
Ad for The Millionaire's Double, 1917

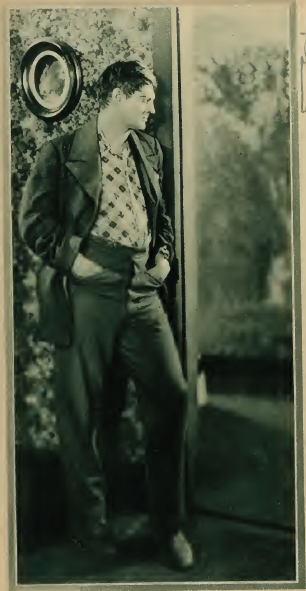
Barrymore in The Copperhead, 1920

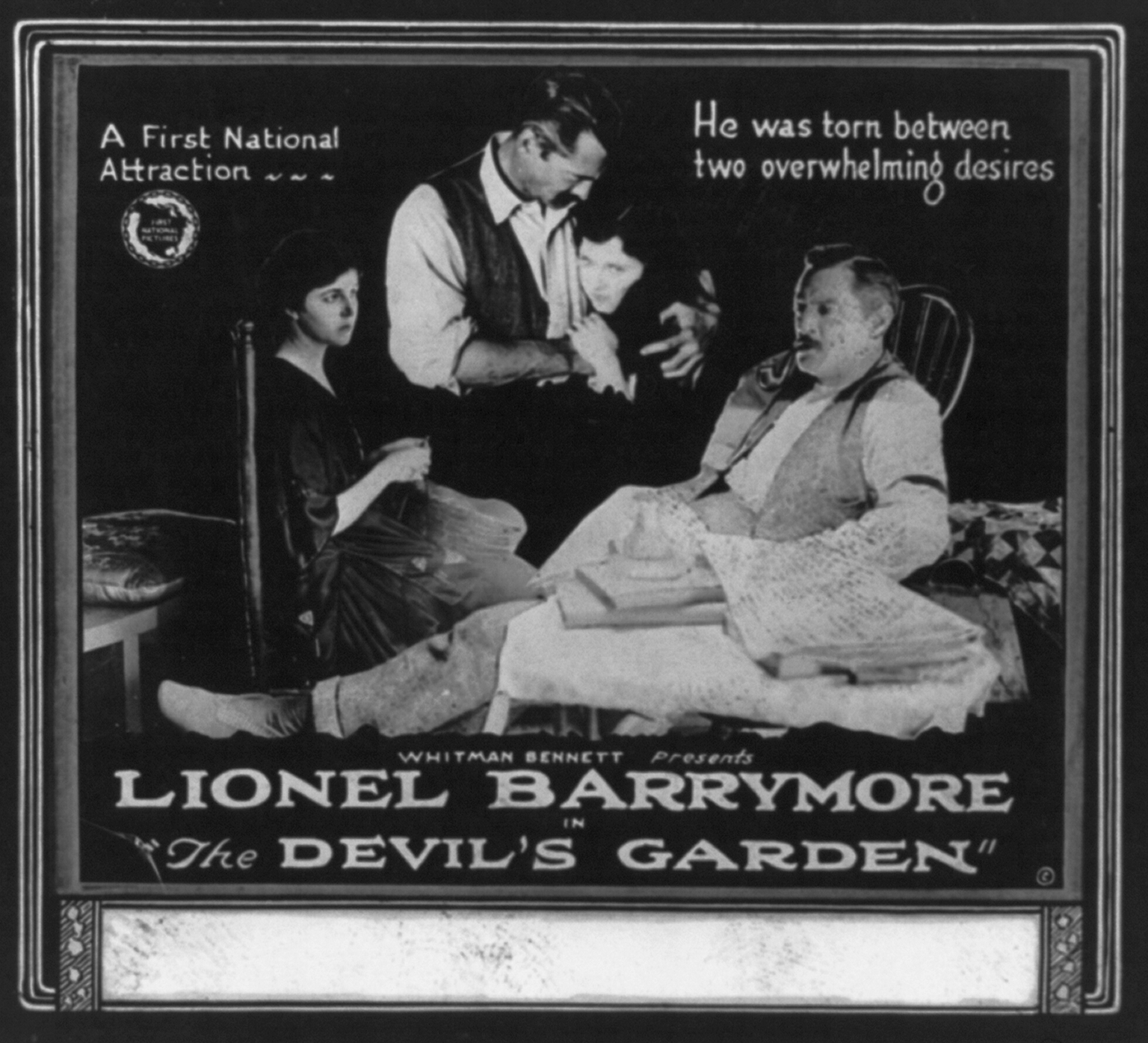
Lantern slide for The Devil's Garden, 1920; Barrymore—on the right—appeared with his wife, Doris Rankin, who sits on the left.

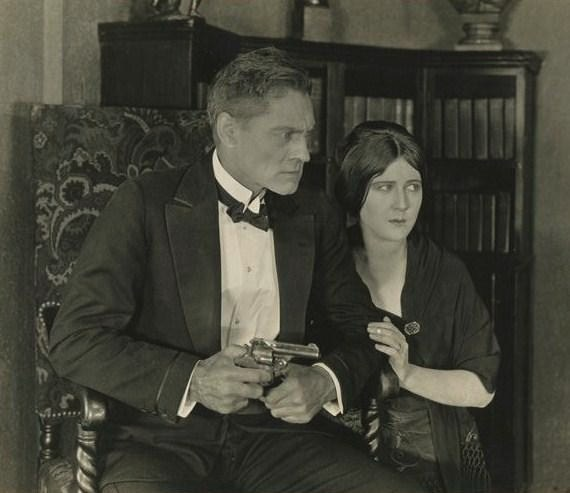
Barrymore and Seena Owen in The Face in the Fog, 1922

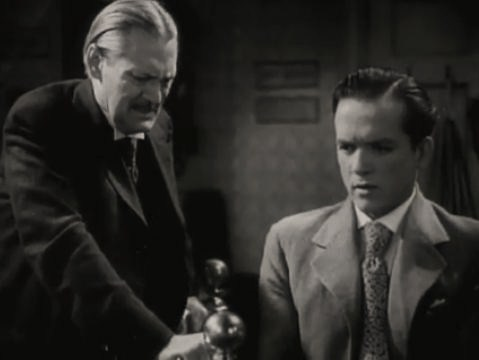
Barrymore in Ah, Wilderness!, 1935

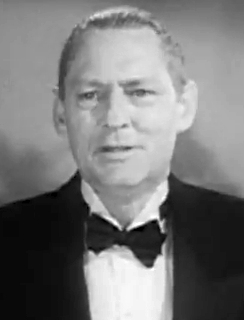
Barrymore in a trailer for David Copperfield, 1935

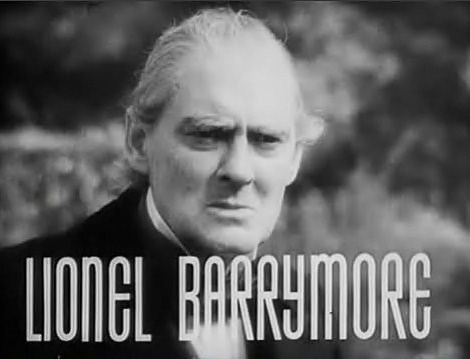
Barrymore in Camille, 1936

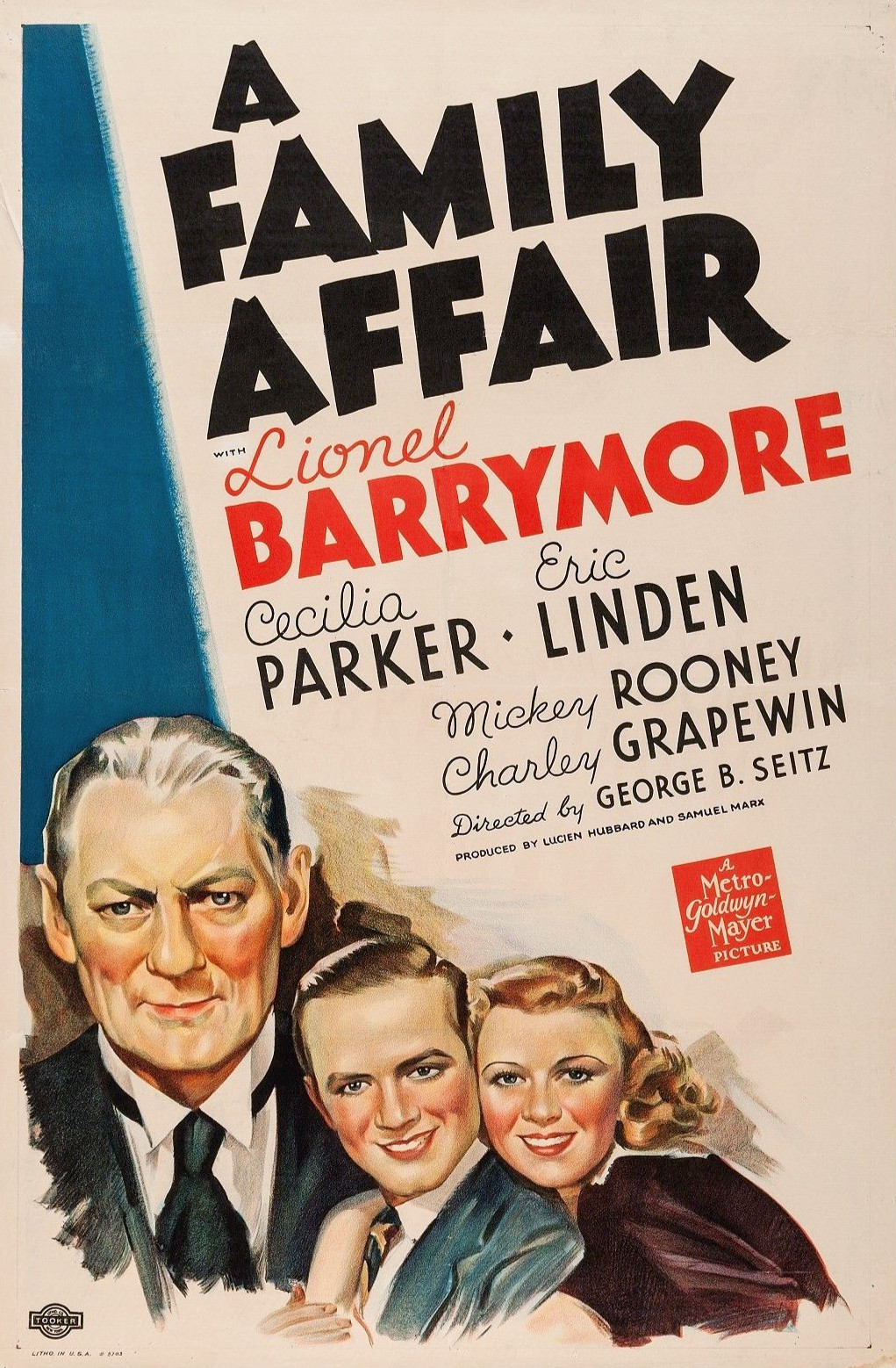
Poster for A Family Affair, 1937

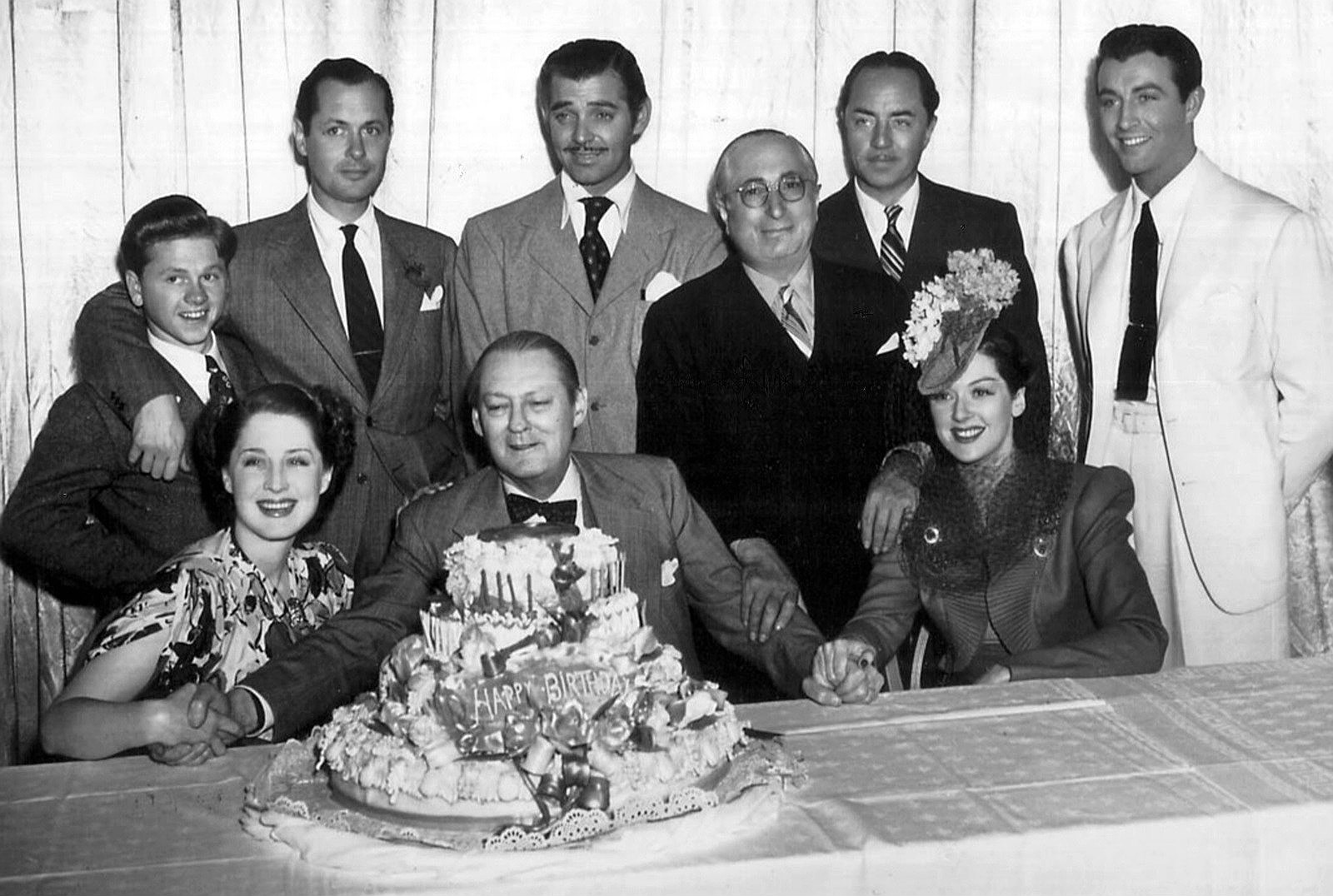
Barrymore celebrating his 61st birthday in 1939. Back, from left: Mickey Rooney, Robert Montgomery, Clark Gable, William Powell, and Robert Taylor; center: Louis B. Mayer; front, from left: Norma Shearer, Barrymore, and Rosalind Russell.

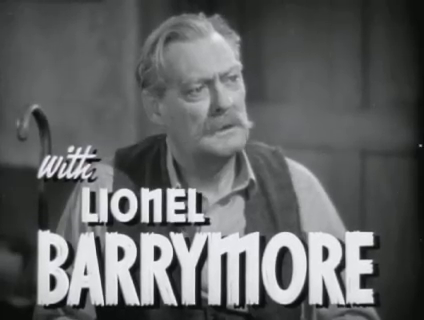
Barrymore in The Bad Man, 1941

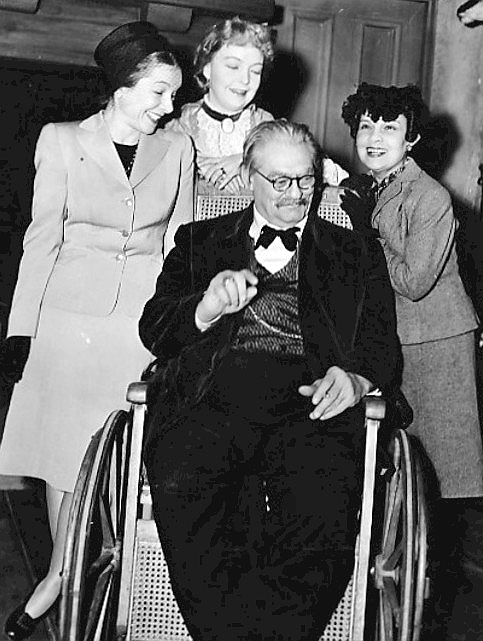
Barrymore in 1946 on the set of Duel in the Sun with, from the left, Helen Hayes, Anita Loos, and Lillian Gish.

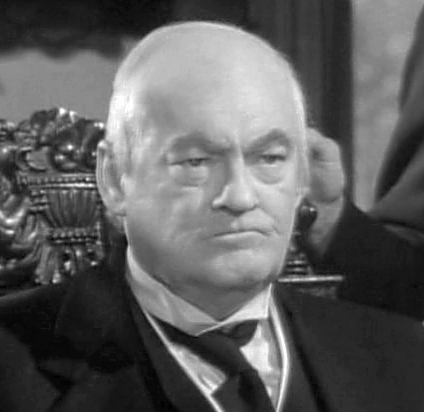
Barrymore as Mr. Potter in It's a Wonderful Life, 1946

The list does not include the 1913 film The Vengeance of Galora, which Barrymore wrote. Although some sources list him as also appearing in the film, his biographers, James Kotsilibas-Davis and Margot Peters, separately state he did not. Kotsilibas-Davis also lists Fighting Blood (1911), My Hero (1912), and The Musketeers of Pig Alley (1912) as films in which Barrymore did not appear, despite claims of other biographers to the contrary; Peters does not list the films in her filmography of the actor. However short films, like feature films, do survive incomplete as with many in the Library of Congress collection. Finding complete prints is still in progress.

Barrymore's filmography
Film	Year	Role	Notes	Ref.
Fighting Blood	1911		Debut with Biograph.	
The Battle	1911	Wagon driver	*uncredited	
The Miser's Heart	1911	Jules		
A Lodging for the Night	1912	Desperado at card table	*uncredited	
Home Folks	1912	–		
Friends	1912	Grizzley Fallon		
So Near, Yet so Far	1912	–		
The Chief's Blanket	1912	Young man	Lost film	
The One She Loved	1912	Neighbor		
The Painted Lady	1912	Woodsman		
Heredity	1912	–	Lost film	
Gold and Glitter	1912	–		
My Baby	1912	–		
The Informer	1912	Union soldier		
Brutality	1912	–		
The New York Hat	1912	Preacher Bolton		
The Burglar's Dilemma	1912	Householder	Actor and writer	
A Cry for Help	1912	–	Lost film	
The God Within	1912	–		
Three Friends	1913	Second friend	Lost film	
The Telephone Girl and the Lady	1913	Desk sergeant		
An Adventure in the Autumn Woods	1913	Father	Lost film	
The Tender Hearted Boy	1913	–	Actor and writer Lost film	
Oil and Water	1913	–		
A Chance Deception	1913	–	Lost film	
Love in an Apartment Hotel	1913	–	Lost film	
The Wrong Bottle	1913	–	Lost film	
A Girl's Stratagem	1913	–	Lost film	
The Unwelcome Guest	1913	–		
Near to Earth	1913	–	Lost film	
Fate	1913	–		
The Sheriff's Baby	1913	–	Lost film	
The Perfidy of Mary	1913	–		
The Little Tease	1913	–		
A Misunderstood Boy	1913	–		
The Lady and the Mouse	1913	–		
The Wanderer	1913	–		
The House of Darkness	1913	–		
The Yaqui Cur	1913	–		
Just Gold	1913	–		
The Ranchero's Revenge	1913	–	Lost film	
A Timely Interception	1913	–		
Red Hicks Defies the World	1913	–	Lost film	
The Well	1913	–	Lost film	
Death's Marathon	1913	Financial backer		
The Switch Tower	1913	–		
Almost a Wild Man	1913	–		
In Diplomatic Circles	1913	–	Lost film	
A Gamble with Death	1913	Jim Benton	Lost film	
The Enemy's Baby	1913	–	Lost film	
Pa Says	1913	Teddy's Rival		
The Mirror	1913	–	Lost film	
Under the Shadow of the Law	1913	–	Lost film	
I Was Meant for You	1913	–	Lost film	
An Indian's Loyalty	1913	–	Lost film	
The Suffragette Minstrels	1913	–	Lost film	
The Work Habit	1913	–	Lost film	
The Crook and the Girl	1913	–	Lost film	
The Strong Man's Burden	1913	–	*Lionel designed the lobby poster for this movie. Lost film	
The Stolen Treaty	1913	–	Lost film	
So Runs the Way	1913	–	Lost film	
All for Science	1913	–	Lost film	
The Battle at Elderbush Gulch	1913	–		
The House of Discord	1913	–		
The Bartered Crown	1914	Landlord	Lost film	
Classmates	1914	Dumble		
Her Father's Silent Partner	1914	–	Lost film	
The Massacre	1914	–		
Judith of Bethulia	1914	–		
Strongheart	1914	–	Lost film	
Brute Force	1914	–		
Woman Against Woman	1914	–		
The Cracksman's Gratitude	1914	–	Lost film	
Men and Women	1914	–		
The Power of the Press	1914	Steve Carson		
The Woman in Black	1914	Robert Crane		
The Span of Life	1914	Richard Blunt	Lost film	
The Seats of the Mighty	1914	Monsieur Doltaire	Lost film	
Under the Gaslight	1914	William Byke	Lost film	
Wildfire	1915	John Keefe	Incomplete film	
A Modern Magdalen	1915	Lindsay	Lost film	
The Curious Conduct of Judge Legarde	1915	Judge Randolph Legarde	Lost film	
The Romance of Elaine	1915	Elaine	Lost film	
The Flaming Sword	1915	–	Lost film	
Dora Thorne	1915	Lord Earle	Lost film	
A Yellow Streak	1915	Barry Dale	Lost film	
Dorian's Divorce	1916	Richard Dorian		
The Quitter	1916	"Happy Jack" Lewis		
The Upheaval	1916	Jim Gordon		
The Brand of Cowardice	1916	Cyril Hamilton	Lost film	
The End of the Tour	1917	Byron Bennett	Lost film	
His Father's Son	1917	J. Dabney Barron		
The Millionaire's Double	1917	Bide Bennington	Lost film	
National Red Cross Pageant	1917	Himself	Lost film; Ethel appeared with Lionel in Camille scene	
The Copperhead	1920	Milt Shanks		
The Master Mind	1920	Henry Allen	Lost film	
The Devil's Garden	1920	William Dale	Lost film	
The Great Adventure	1921	Priam Farll		
Jim the Penman	1921	James Ralston	Incomplete film	
Boomerang Bill	1922	Boomerang Bill	Incomplete film	
The Face in the Fog	1922	Boston Blackie Dawson	Incomplete film	
Enemies of Women	1923	Prince Lubimoff	Incomplete film	
Unseeing Eyes	1923	Conrad Dean	Lost film	
The Eternal City	1923	Baron Bonelli	Incomplete film, only last two reels exists	
America	1924	Capt. Walter Butler		
Decameron Nights	1924	Saladin	Lost film	
Meddling Women	1924	Edwin Ainsworth/John Wells		
I Am the Man	1924	James McQuade	Lost film	
A Man of Iron	1925	Philip Durban	Lost film	
The Girl Who Wouldn't Work	1925	Gordon Kent		
Children of the Whirlwind	1925	Joe Ellison	Lost film	
The Wrongdoers	1925	Daniel Abbott		
Fifty-Fifty	1925	Frederick Harmon	Lost film	
The Splendid Road	1925	Dan Clehollis	Lost film	
The Woman Who Did	1925	Allan Merrick	Lost film	
Ben-Hur	1925	Extra		
Brooding Eyes	1926	Slim Jim Carey	Lost film	
The Barrier	1926	Stark Bennett	Lost film	
Wife Tamers	1926	Mr. Barry		
Paris at Midnight	1926	Vautrin		
The Lucky Lady	1926	Count Ferranzo		
The Bells	1926	Mathias		
The Temptress	1926	Canterac		
The Show	1927	The Greek		
Women Love Diamonds	1927	Hugo Harlan		
Body and Soul	1927	Dr. Leyden		
The Thirteenth Hour	1927	Professor Leroy		
Sadie Thompson	1928	Alfred Davidson		
Drums of Love	1928	Duke Cathos de Alvia		
The Lion and the Mouse	1928	"Ready Money" Ryder		
Road House	1928	Henry Grayson	Lost film	
Alias Jimmy Valentine	1928	Doyle	Lost film	
West of Zanzibar	1928	Crane		
The River Woman	1928	Bill Lefty		
The Mysterious Island	1929	Count Andre Dakkar		
The Hollywood Revue of 1929	1929	Himself	–	
Free and Easy	1930	Himself		
Guilty Hands	1931	Richard Grant		
A Free Soul	1931	Stephen Ashe	Barrymore won the Academy Award for Best Actor	
The Yellow Ticket	1931	Baron Igor Andreeff		
Mata Hari	1931	General Serge Shubin		
Broken Lullaby	1932	Dr. Holderlin		
Arsène Lupin	1932	Guerchard		
Grand Hotel	1932	Otto Kringelein		
The Washington Masquerade	1932	Jefferson Keane		
Rasputin and the Empress	1932	Rasputin		
Sweepings	1933	Daniel Pardway		
Looking Forward	1933	Benton		
The Stranger's Return	1933	Grandpa Storr		
Dinner at Eight	1933	Oliver Jordan		
One Man's Journey	1933	Eli Watt		
Night Flight	1933	Inspector Robineau		
Christopher Bean	1933	Dr. Milton Haggett		
Should Ladies Behave	1933	Augustus Merrick		
This Side of Heaven	1934	Martin Turner		
Carolina	1934	Bob Connelly		
The Girl from Missouri	1934	T. R. Paige		
Treasure Island	1934	Billy Bones		
David Copperfield	1935	Dan Peggotty		
The Little Colonel	1935	Colonel Lloyd		
Mark of the Vampire	1935	Professor Zelin		
Public Hero ﹟1	1935	Dr. Josiah Glass		
The Return of Peter Grimm	1935	Peter Grimm		
Ah, Wilderness!	1935	Nat Miller		
The Voice of Bugle Ann	1936	Spring Davis		
The Road to Glory	1936	La Roche	The character is also known as Private Morain	
The Devil-Doll	1936	Paul Lavond		
The Gorgeous Hussy	1936	Andrew Jackson		
Camille	1936	Monsieur Duval		
A Family Affair	1937	Judge James K. Hardy		
Captains Courageous	1937	Capt. Disko Troop		
Saratoga	1937	Grandpa Clayton		
Navy Blue and Gold	1937	Captain "Skinny" Dawes		
A Yank at Oxford	1938	Dan Sheridan		
Test Pilot	1938	Howard B. Drake		
You Can't Take It with You	1938	Martin Vanderhof		
Young Dr. Kildare	1938	Dr. Leonard Gillespie		
Let Freedom Ring	1939	Thomas Logan		
Calling Dr. Kildare	1939	Dr. Leonard Gillespie		
On Borrowed Time	1939	Julian Northrup		
The Secret of Dr. Kildare	1939	Dr. Leonard Gillespie		
The Stars Look Down	1940	Narrator	Barrymore's narration is on the US release only	
Dr. Kildare's Strange Case	1940	Dr. Leonard Gillespie		
Dr. Kildare Goes Home	1940	Dr. Leonard Gillespie		
Dr. Kildare's Crisis	1940	Dr. Leonard Gillespie		
The Penalty	1941	"Grandpa" Logan		
The Bad Man	1941	Uncle Henry Jones		
The People vs. Dr. Kildare	1941	Dr. Leonard Gillespie		
Dr. Kildare's Wedding Day	1941	Dr. Leonard Gillespie	Barrymore also composed the music	
Lady Be Good	1941	Judge Murdock		
Dr. Kildare's Victory	1942	Dr. Leonard Gillespie		
Calling Dr. Gillespie	1942	Dr. Leonard Gillespie		
Dr. Gillespie's New Assistant	1942	Dr. Leonard Gillespie		
Tennessee Johnson	1942	Thaddeus Stevens		
Dr. Gillespie's Criminal Case	1943	Dr. Leonard Gillespie		
The Last Will and Testament of Tom Smith	1943	Gramps	Short	
A Guy Named Joe	1943	The General		
Three Men in White	1944	Dr. Leonard Gillespie		
Since You Went Away	1944	Clergyman		
Dragon Seed	1944	Narrator		
Thousands Cheer	1944	Announcer		
Between Two Women	1945	Dr. Leonard Gillespie		
The Valley of Decision	1945	Pat Rafferty		
Three Wise Fools	1946	Dr. Richard Gaunght		
It's a Wonderful Life	1946	Henry F. Potter		
The Secret Heart	1946	Dr. Rossiger		
Duel in the Sun	1946	Senator Jackson McCanles		
Dark Delusion	1947	Dr. Leonard Gillespie		
Key Largo	1948	James Temple		
Down to the Sea in Ships	1949	Captain Bering Joy		
Malaya	1949	John Manchester		
Right Cross	1950	Sean O'Malley		
Bannerline	1951	Hugo Trimble		
Lone Star	1952	Andrew Jackson		
Main Street to Broadway	1953	Himself		
Our Mr. Sun	1956	Father Times	voice (released posthumously)	

=== As director ===
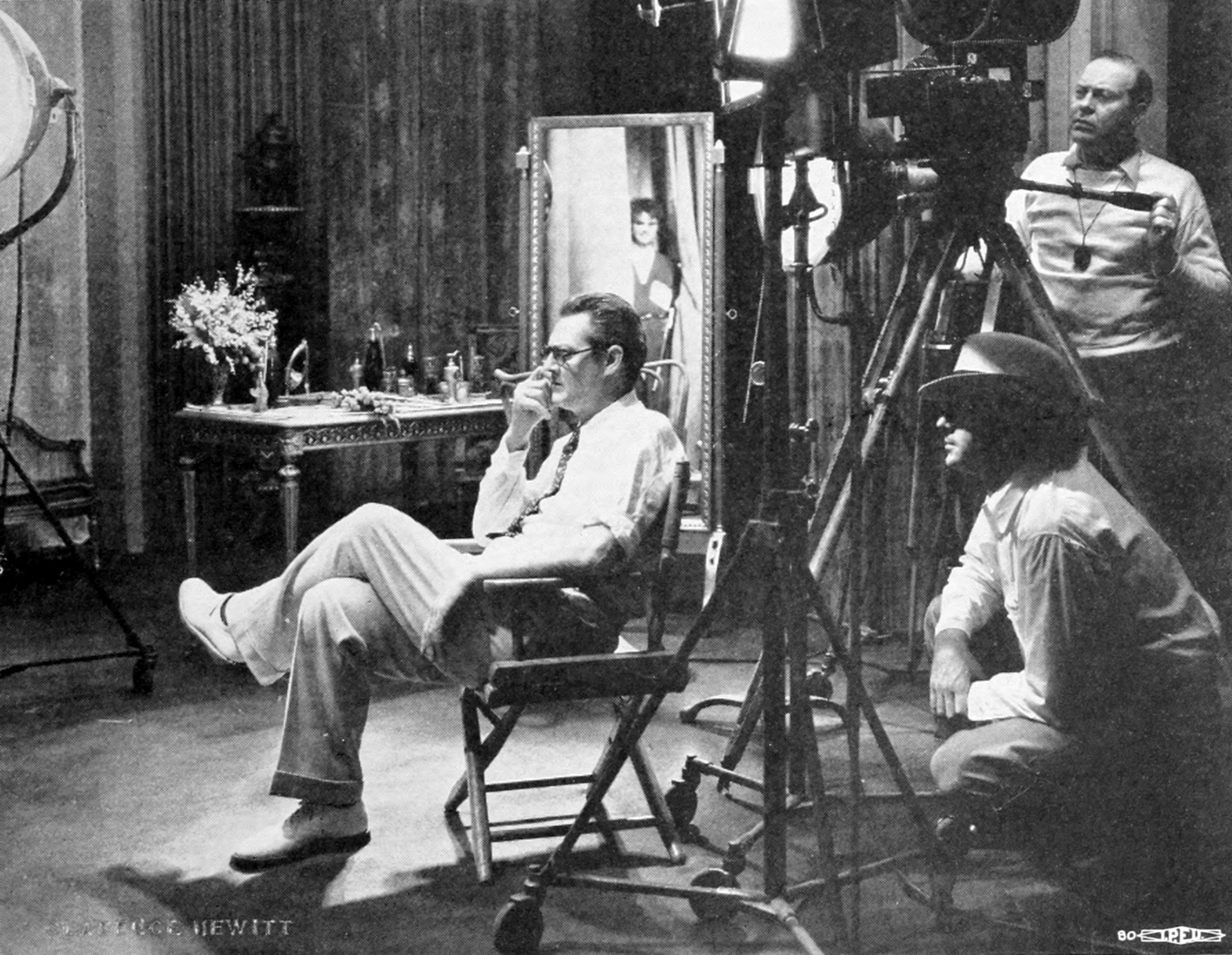
Barrymore directing The Rogue Song (1930)

Barrymore's director credits
Film	Year	Notes	Ref.
His Secret	1914	Lost film	
Where's the Baby?	1914	Lost film	
No Place for Father	1914	Lost film	
Just Boys	1914	Lost film	
Chocolate Dynamite	1914	Lost film	
Life's Whirlpool	1917	Also writer; lost film	
His Glorious Night	1929	Barrymore also composed the music	
Madame X	1929	Barrymore was nominated for the Academy Award for Best Director	
The Unholy Night	1929		
Confession	1929		
The Rogue Song	1930		
Redemption	1930	Only for retakes	
The Sea Bat	1930	Uncredited	
Guilty Hands	1931	Uncredited	
Ten Cents a Dance	1931		

== Radio broadcasts ==
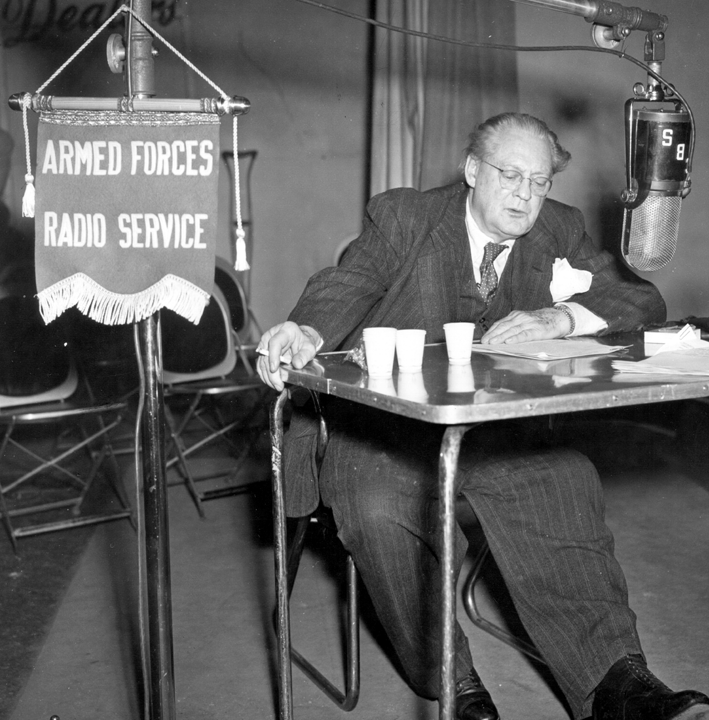
Barrymore broadcasting on the Armed Forces Radio Service, c. 1947

Barrymore's radio credits (selected)
Title	Date	Role	Network	Notes	Ref.
A Christmas Carol	December 25, 1934 – December 25, 1953	Ebenezer Scrooge	CBS	Broadcast annually on Christmas Day	
Mayor of the Town	1942–1949	The Mayor	ABC, CBS, Mutual, and NBC	Barrymore also composed the theme	
Screen Guild Players: "The Old Lady Shows Her Medals"	October 7, 1946	Narrator	CBS	Barrymore played the narration as the author, J. M. Barrie	
Dr. Kildare	1949–1952	Dr. Leonard Gillespie	Syndicated		
The Hallmark Hall of Fame	1953–1955	Host	CBS		

== Television broadcast ==
Barrymore's television credit
Title	Date	Role	Network	Notes	Ref.
Our Mr. Sun	November 19, 1956	Father Time	CBS	Posthumous Release	

== Bibliography ==
- Alpert, Hollis (1965). The Barrymores. London: W.H. Allen. OCLC 30274937.
- Barrymore, Lionel (1951). We Barrymores. New York, NY: Appleton-Century-Crofts. OCLC 594282.
- Byers, Paula K., ed. (1998). "The Barrymores". Encyclopedia of World Biography. Detroit, MI: Gale Research. ISBN 978-0-7876-2541-2.
- Cullen, Frank (2004). Vaudeville old & new: an encyclopedia of variety performances in America. London: Psychology Press. ISBN 978-0-415-93853-2.
- DeGiglio-Bellemare, Mario; Ellbé, Charlie; Woofter, Kristopher (2014). Recovering 1940s Horror Cinema: Traces of a Lost Decade. Lanham, MD: Lexington Books. ISBN 978-1-4985-0380-8.
- Dunning, John (1998). On the Air: The Encyclopedia of Old-Time Radio. Oxford: Oxford University Press. ISBN 978-0-19-977078-6.
- Flom, Eric L. (2009). Silent Film Stars on the Stages of Seattle. Jefferson, NC: McFarland & Company. ISBN 978-0-7864-3908-9.
- Graham, Cooper C. (1985). D.W. Griffith and the Biograph Company. Lanham, MD: Scarecrow Press. ISBN 978-0-8108-1806-4.
- Hoffman, Carol Stein (2001). The Barrymores: Hollywood's First Family. Lexington, KY: University Press of Kentucky. ISBN 978-0-8131-2213-7.
- Holston, Kim R. (2012). Movie Roadshows: A History and Filmography of Reserved-Seat Limited Showings, 1911–1973. Jefferson, NC: McFarland & Company. ISBN 978-0-7864-9261-9.
- Katchmer, George A. (2002). A Biographical Dictionary of Silent Film Western Actors and Actresses. Jefferson, NC: McFarland & Company. ISBN 978-0-7864-4693-3.
- Kotsilibas-Davis, James (1981). The Barrymores: the Royal Family in Hollywood. New York, NY: Crown Publishers. ISBN 978-0-517-52896-9.
- Langman, Larry (1992). A Guide to Silent Westerns. Santa Barbara, CA: Greenwood Publishing Group. ISBN 978-0-313-27858-7.
- Lucanio, Patrick; Coville, Gary (2002). Smokin' Rockets: The Romance of Technology in American Film, Radio and Television, 1945–1962. Jefferson, NC: McFarland & Company. ISBN 978-0-7864-1233-4.
- Marshall, Wendy L. (2005). William Beaudine: From Silents to Television. Lanham, MD: Scarecrow Press. ISBN 978-0-8108-5218-1.
- Peters, Margot (1990). The House of Barrymore. New York, NY: Touchstone. ISBN 978-0-671-74799-2.
- Quinlan, David (1997). The Film Lover's Companion: An A to Z Guide to 2,000 Stars and the Movies They Made. New York, NY: Carol Publishing Group. ISBN 978-0-8065-1892-3.
- Rainey, Buck (2004). The Strong, Silent Type: Over 100 Screen Cowboys, 1903–1930. Jefferson, NC: McFarland & Company. ISBN 978-0-7864-1286-0.
- Terrace, Vincent (1998). Radio Programs, 1924–1984: A Catalog of More Than 1800 Shows. Jefferson, NC: McFarland & Company. ISBN 978-1-4766-0528-9.
- Terrace, Vincent (2003). Radio Program Openings and Closings, 1931–1972. Jefferson, NC: McFarland & Company. ISBN 978-0-7864-4925-5.
- Usai, Paolo Cherchi (2002). The Griffith Project: Films Produced in 1912. London: British Film Institute. ISBN 978-0-85170-953-6.
