= The Stolen Bride =

The Stolen Bride may refer to:

- The Stolen Bride (1913 film), a silent American film directed by Anthony O'Sullivan
- The Stolen Bride (1927 film), a silent American film directed by Alexander Korda
