= The Vengeance of Galora =

1913 American silent drama film

- Directed by: Anthony O'Sullivan
- Written by: Lionel Barrymore
- Starring: Claire McDowell
- Release date: July 28, 1913
- Running time: 10 minutes
- Country: United States
- Languages: Silent; English intertitles

The Vengeance of Galora is a 1913 American silent drama film featuring Harry Carey.

== Cast ==
- Claire McDowell as Galora
- Charles West as The Express Agent
- Nan Christy as The Express Agent's Fiancée
- Harry Carey as A Prospector
- John T. Dillon as The Sheriff
- Lionel Barrymore as (unconfirmed)
- Dorothy Gish as (unconfirmed)
- Blanche Sweet as (unconfirmed)
- Henry B. Walthall as (unconfirmed)

== See also ==
- Harry Carey filmography
- Lionel Barrymore filmography
- Blanche Sweet filmography
