= The Stolen Treaty =

The Stolen Treaty may refer to:

- The Stolen Treaty (1913 film), a silent film directed by Anthony O'Sullivan
- The Stolen Treaty (1917 film), a silent film directed by Paul Scardon
