= Anthony O'Sullivan =

American actor

- Born: c. 1855; Ireland
- Died: July 5, 1920; The Bronx, New York
- Occupations: Actor, film director
- Years active: 1906–1918

Anthony O'Sullivan (c. 1855 – July 5, 1920) was an American silent film actor and film director. He appeared in more than 160 films between 1906 and 1918. He also directed 35 films between 1913 and 1915. He died in The Bronx, New York

== Director ==
- The Wrong Bottle (1913)
- The Stolen Bride (1913)
- A Frightful Blunder (1913)
- The Mirror (1913)
- Olaf—An Atom (1913)
- A Dangerous Foe (1913)
- The Well (1913)
- The Switch Tower (1913)
- In Diplomatic Circles (1913)
- A Gamble with Death (1913)
- A Gambler's Honor (1913)
- The Vengeance of Galora (1913)
- When Love Forgives (1913)
- Under the Shadow of the Law (1913)
- I Was Meant for You (1913)
- The Crook and the Girl (1913)
- The Strong Man's Burden (1913)
- The Stolen Treaty (1913)
- The Law and His Son (1913)
- A Tender-Hearted Crook (1913)
- The Van Nostrand Tiara (1913)
- The Stopped Clock (1913)
- All for Science (1913)
- The Cracksman's Gratitude (1914)
- The Way Out (1915)
- Her Convert (1915)
- Old Offenders (1915)
- As It Happened (1915)

== Actor ==
- The Black Hand (1906)
- A Calamitous Elopement (1908)
- The Fight for Freedom (1908)
- The Greaser's Gauntlet (1908)
- The Invisible Fluid (1908)
- The Fatal Hour (1908)
- Monday Morning in a Coney Island Police Court (1908)
- The Red Girl (1908)
- The Pirate's Gold (1908)
- The Kentuckian (1908)
- Mrs. Jones Entertains (1909)
- The Lonely Villa (1909)
- The Hessian Renegades (1909)
- Pippa Passes (1909)
- Nursing a Viper (1909)
- The Death Disc: A Story of the Cromwellian Period (1909)
- The Red Man's View (1909)
- A Trap for Santa (1909)
- In Little Italy (1909)
- The Day After (1909)
- Choosing a Husband (1909)
- Two Memories (1909)
- The Rocky Road (1910)
- The Two Brothers (1910)
- Ramona (1910)
- What the Daisy Said (1910)
- A Flash of Light (1910)
- The Modern Prodigal (1910) as At Farewell
- A Mohawk's Way (1910) as Trapper
- The Goddess of Sagebrush Gulch (1912)
- Old Offenders (1915)
- The Pullman Bride (1917)
- Are Waitresses Safe? (1917)
