= The Crook and the Girl =

1913 film

- Directed by: Anthony O'Sullivan
- Written by: Emil Kruschke
- Starring: Lionel Barrymore
- Distributed by: General Film Company
- Release date: August 25, 1913
- Country: United States
- Language: Silent with English intertitles

The Crook and the Girl is a 1913 American drama film featuring Harry Carey.

== Cast ==
- Lionel Barrymore as The Nephew
- Harry Carey as The Crook
- Claire McDowell as The Uncle's Adopted Daughter
- Hector Dion as The Butler
- William J. Butler as The Lawyer

== See also ==
- List of American films of 1913
- Harry Carey filmography
- Lionel Barrymore filmography
