= In Diplomatic Circles =

1913 film

- Directed by: Anthony O'Sullivan
- Written by: Frank E. Woods
- Starring: Walter Miller
- Distributed by: General Film Company
- Release date: June 26, 1913
- Country: United States
- Language: Silent with English intertitles

In Diplomatic Circles is a 1913 American silent short drama film featuring Harry Carey.

== Plot ==
According to the copyright description, "At the beginning of the picture a scene in the editorial rooms of the Globe is shown. A reporter is given the following assignment. "It is rumored that the Japanese Ambassador will deliver a reply of his government to the Secretary of State at his home to-day. Every foreign, government is eager for a copy ahead of the official announcement to-morrow. Get it for the Globe," The reporter goes out. At the grounds of the Secretary of State his young daughter is entertaining her prospective lover. They leave for a walk about the grounds. At this point the reporter enters and asks for an interview but is refused by the Secretary, who orders him from the grounds and returns to his private office inside the mansion. The Japanese Ambassador, who calls at this point, is intercepted by the reporter. He is about to give the interview when the Secretary, coming out of the door, rushes down and prevents. Again the reporter is sent away. The butler also appears, who, in reality, is in the employ of a foreign government as spy, and to further his own ends, orders the reporter away. He, however, concludes to stick to his job. Back in the private office of the Secretary the butler is ordered to bring drinks for the ambassador and the secretary. He becomes over curious when the document is brought forward and is ordered from the room. Presently he appears at one of the side doors and summons a gardener near-by. He gives the gardener a note which is delivered to another spy in the cafe in the city.

The note reads: "I am ordered to get a copy of the Japanese reply before the other governments, but I am suspected. Call on the Secretary's daughter when I will hand it over. You are not known as a spy." The spy tears the letter up and proceeds to the Secretary's grounds. Meanwhile the Secretary's daughter and her lover have come to a conclusion in their love affair. She asks him to go tell her father. He bashfully consents and walks into the room in the midst of the discussion. He withdraws in confusion. While he and the girl are seated in the grounds, the spy from the cafe appears, evidently assuming to make a social call. The butler, who, during the absence of the Secretary of State and the ambassador on a walk through the grounds, has entered the private office and stolen the document, now signals the spy that he has the document. The spy excuses himself and joins the butler. Unobserved he places the document in his shoe and gives the envelope to the butler. Meanwhile, the lover has again returned to the Secretary's office for an answer and has found it empty. The Secretary returns, discovers the absence of the document, and at once blames the young lover. The ambassador is summoned by the butler and in an unguarded moment the butler places the envelope from his own pocket into the pocket of the lover. A detective is summoned and a search is begun.

The envelope is found in the lover’s pocket and he is suspected. The reporter from behind a bush sees the spy leaving the grounds. He removes the document from the side of his shoe and places it in his hat. This is observed by the reporter. The detective passes and the reporter concludes to follow him. He enteres [sic] the private office of the Secretary and also agrees that the lover is guilty. The reporter, looking in at a side window, overhears the conversation and enters. It tells of a spy who has just left the grounds and also finds the butler's keys which he has unwittingly left behind. Thus the butler is found guilty. The party set out in an automobile and capture the spy as he is entering the legation of which he is a member. Returning to the house, the Secretary gives the necessary consent to the lover and also grants an interview to the reporter."

== Cast ==
- Walter Miller as The Reporter
- William J. Butler as The Father
- Constance Johnson as The Daughter
- Charles West as The Lover
- Lionel Barrymore as The Japanese Ambassador
- William Courtright as The Secretary of State
- Harry Hyde as The Foreign Agent
- Harry Carey as The Butler
- John T. Dillon as The Detective

== See also ==
- Harry Carey filmography
- Lionel Barrymore filmography
