= The Way Out (1915 film) =

1915 film

- Directed by: Anthony O'Sullivan
- Starring: Harry Carey
- Production company: Biograph Company
- Release date: June 19, 1915
- Running time: 1 reel
- Country: United States
- Language: Silent with English intertitles

The Way Out is a 1915 American silent drama film short film featuring Harry Carey.

== Plot ==
According to the copyright description, "While packing her trunk preparatory to leaving home for the adjoining county, where she has been called to teach, the young school teacher discovers that one of her rings is broken. Her father volunteers to have the ring mended and bring it to her. On her first day at school a new pupil is enrolled-the motherless daughter of a resident, who personally escorts the child to school. The acquaintance thus begins and ripens into love. The girl's father writes that he is coming to visit her. He does not come, but is brought in, dead, by men who have found his body on the trail, a victim of bandits. When the girl resumes her schoolwork, her lover's daughter, among others, brings her a little token of sympathy. As she hands up her gift the teacher's eye is caught by a ring on the child's finger. It is the ring her father was to bring her. The child says that she found it on the table in her home. Hardly daring to think, the girl goes to her lover's home and learns from him his guilty secret. He is a bandit, but for her sake he had resolved to go straight. Penniless, he had made one more hold-up; the victim had resisted, and he had been forced to kill him. While emptying the dead man's wallet, he had not seen the ring roll out on the table. Aghast at the news that he has killed his sweetheart's father, the bandit offers her his pistol; but she will not shoot, and he goes out, taking the weapon with him. A shot is heard. He has found a way out. The girl leads his orphaned daughter to her own home."

== Cast ==
- Harry Carey as The Bandit
- Claire McDowell The Teacher
- L. M. Wells The Father (credited as Louis Wells)
