= A Gamble with Death =

1913 film

- Directed by: Anthony O'Sullivan
- Written by: F. W. Randolph
- Starring: Walter Miller
- Distributed by: General Film Company
- Release date: June 30, 1913
- Country: United States
- Language: Silent with English intertitles

A Gamble with Death is a 1913 American one-reel drama film featuring Harry Carey. It was described as "a sensational tale of Western life" in an Australian newspaper.

== Cast ==
- Walter Miller as Reed
- Claire McDowell as Kate
- Charles West as The Gambler (credited as Charles H. West)
- Lionel Barrymore as Jim Benton, The Bartender
- Harry Carey as The Cowpuncher

== See also ==
- Harry Carey filmography
- Lionel Barrymore filmography
