= The Enemy's Baby =

1913 film

- Directed by: D. W. Griffith
- Written by: B. F. Clinton
- Starring: Lionel Barrymore
- Distributed by: General Film Company
- Release date: July 10, 1913 (U.S.)
- Country: United States
- Language: Silent (English intertitles)

The Enemy's Baby is a 1913 American drama film, possibly directed by D. W. Griffith.

== Cast ==
- Lionel Barrymore as Ben Brown
- William J. Butler as Sam Miller, the grandfather
- Kate Bruce as Sam Miller's wife
- Harry Carey as Miller
- Claire McDowell as Miller's wife
- William Courtright as extra
- John T. Dillon as extra
- Charles Gorman as the sheriff

== See also ==
- List of American films of 1913
- Harry Carey filmography
- D. W. Griffith filmography
- Lionel Barrymore filmography
