= Under the Shadow of the Law =

1913 film

- Directed by: Anthony O'Sullivan
- Written by: Harry Carey
- Starring: Harry Carey
- Distributed by: General Film Company
- Release date: August 7, 1913
- Country: United States
- Language: Silent with English intertitles

Under the Shadow of the Law is a 1913 American drama film featuring Harry Carey and Claire McDowell, and directed by Anthony O'Sullivan. "A convict's life still remains under the ban of the law, even after the expiration of his term," but he manages to save a young woman and her brother from a predatory employer (Lionel Barrymore). "A lurid melodrama full of action, but with the improbabilities usually found in such", noted The Moving Picture World.

== Cast ==
- Harry Carey as The Convict
- Charles West as John Haywood, A Clerk
- Claire McDowell as John Haywood's Sister
- Lionel Barrymore as Charles Darnton, The Employer
- Walter Miller as The Bookkeeper
- Kate Toncray as The Mother
- John T. Dillon as The Doctor
- Nan Christy as A Nurse

== See also ==
- Harry Carey filmography
- Lionel Barrymore Filmography
