= Hector Dion =

American actor (1881–1943)

- Born: 1881; Boston, Massachusetts, U.S.
- Died: 1943 (aged 61–62); Boston, Massachusetts, U.S.
- Occupation: Actor
- Years active: 1907–1923 (film)

Hector Dion (1881–1943) was an American film actor of the silent era.

== Selected filmography ==
- Just Like a Woman (1912)
- A Lodging for the Night (1912)
- The Wrong Bottle (1913)
- The Crook and the Girl (1913)
- A Tender-Hearted Crook (1913)
- The Stopped Clock (1913)
- The Shepherd Lassie of Argyle (1914)
- The $5,000,000 Counterfeiting Plot (1914)
- Shopgirls (1914)
- The Return of Draw Egan (1916)
- Silas Marner (1916)
- King Lear (1916)
- Fighting Mad (1917)
- One More American (1918)
- The Wolf and His Mate (1918)
- Painted Lips (1918)
- The Lost City (1920)
- Judge Her Not (1921)

== Bibliography ==
- Low, Rachael. The History of the British Film 1914-1918. Routledge, 2005.
