= Claire McDowell =

American actress (1877–1966)

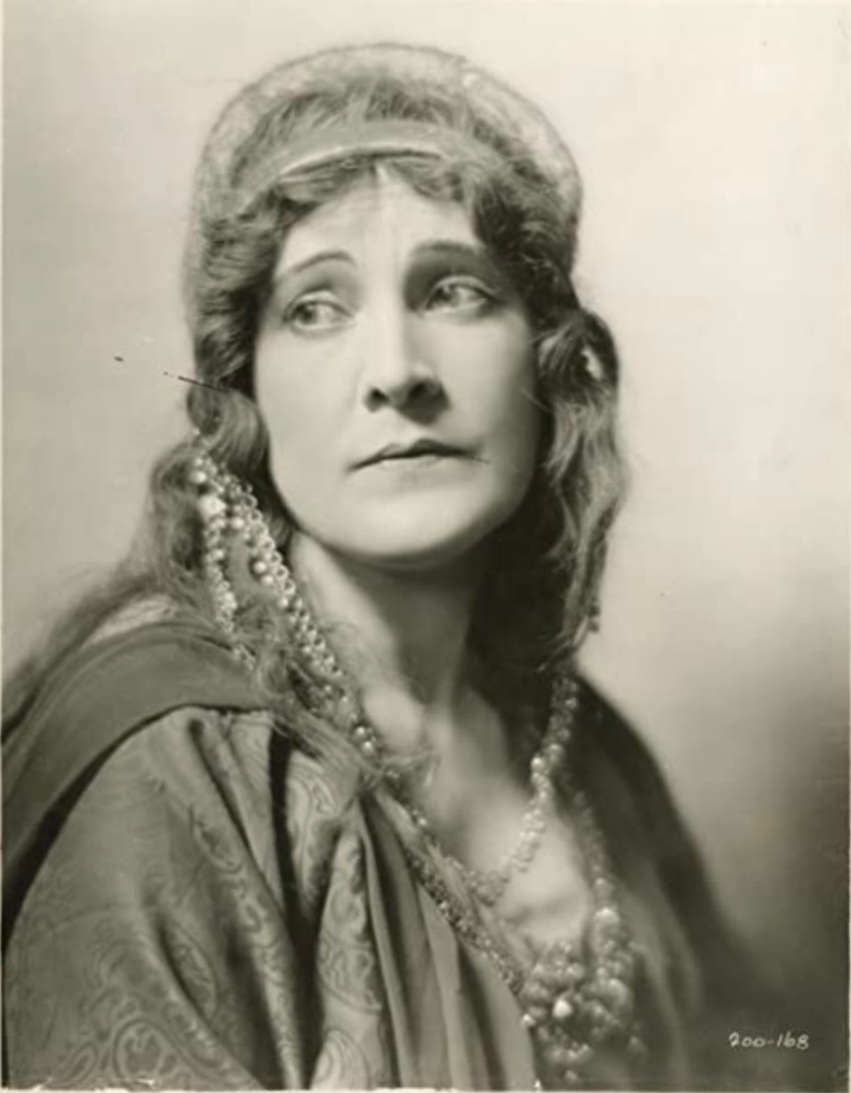
- McDowell in Ben-Hur (1925)
- Born: Claire MacDowell; November 2, 1877; New York City, U.S.
- Died: October 23, 1966 (aged 88); Hollywood, California, U.S.
- Occupation: Actress
- Years active: 1908–1945
- Spouse: Charles Hill Mailes (m. 1906; died 1937)
- Children: 2
- Relatives: Fanny Davenport (aunt); Melbourne MacDowell (uncle)

Claire McDowell (née MacDowell; November 2, 1877 – October 23, 1966) was an American actress of the silent era. She appeared in 350 films between 1908 and 1945.

== Early years ==
Claire MacDowell was born in New York City on November 2, 1877, the daughter of Eugene A. MacDowell and Fanny Reeves. Her aunt, actress Fanny Davenport, gave her early training in acting. Fanny Davenport's second husband was Eugene's brother Melbourne MacDowell.

== Career ==
When she was 17, she was an understudy in a theatrical company headed by Charles Frohman. Still something of a youthful beauty, McDowell appeared in numerous short, early feature films. She graduated to playing character and mother types. She appeared in Douglas Fairbanks' The Mark of Zorro (1920). McDowell costarred in two of the biggest films of the silent era, The Big Parade and Ben-Hur: A Tale of the Christ, in which she played mothers both times. McDowell's Broadway credits included Herod (1909), To Have and to Hold (1901), and Hearts Are Trumps (1900).

When she was 38, McDowell retired, but later she returned to acting, particularly portraying mothers.

== Personal life and death ==
She was married to silent screen character actor Charles Hill Mailes from 1906 until his death in 1937. The couple appeared in numerous silent films together, including The Mark of Zorro. They had two sons, Robert and Eugene. She died in Hollywood, California, on October 23, 1966, ten days before her 89th birthday.

== Selected filmography ==
- The Devil (1908, Short) – Mrs. Harold Thornton
- The Planter's Wife (1908, Short) – Mrs. John Holland
- A Flash of Light (1910, Short) – At First Party
- The Lucky Toothache (1910, Short) – A Cousin
- A Mohawk's Way (1910) as Indian mother
- His Trust (1911, Short) – Colonel Frazier's Wife
- His Trust Fulfilled (1911, Short) – Mrs. Frazier
- What Shall We Do with Our Old? (1911, Short) – The Old Carpenter's Wife
- Fisher Folks (1911)
- A Decree of Destiny (1911, Short) – A Nun
- The Spanish Gypsy (1911, Short) – Paula
- The Broken Cross (1911, Short) – Kate's Mother
- The Crooked Road (1911, Short) – A Neighbor
- The Primal Call (1911, Short) – The Woman
- A Country Cupid (1911, Short) – The Half-Wit's Mother
- The Making of a Man (1911, Short) – Actress
- The Long Road (1911, Short) – Ned's Wife
- A Woman Scorned (1911, Short) – The Doctor's Wife
- As in a Looking Glass (1911) – The Wife
- The School Teacher and the Waif (1912) - Huckster's girlfriend
- Under Burning Skies (1912, Short) – A Friend
- A Temporary Truce (1912, Short) – Mexican Jim's Wife
- The Sands of Dee (1912, Short) – The Artist's Fiancée
- Two Daughters of Eve (1912, Short) – The Mother
- So Near, yet So Far (1912, Short) – Rich Woman in Other Town
- In the Aisles of the Wild (1912, Short) – The Elder Daughter
- A Sailor's Heart (1912, Short) – The Sailor's Third Sweetheart
- The New York Hat (1912, Short) – First Gossip
- A Cry for Help (1912, Short) – The Thief's Wife – the Charity Patient
- The God Within (1912, Short) – The Woodsman's Wife
- The Telephone Girl and the Lady (1913, Short) – The Lady
- A Misappropriated Turkey (1913, Short) – Mrs. Fallon
- The Wrong Bottle (1913, Short) – The Blind Sister
- The Unwelcome Guest (1913, Short) – The Wife
- A Welcome Intruder (1913, Short) – A Widow
- The Stolen Bride (1913, Short) – The Wife
- The Wanderer (1913, Short) – The Female Lover
- The Tenderfoot's Money (1913, Short) – The Prospector's Wife
- The Stolen Loaf (1913, Short) – The Rich Woman
- The House of Darkness (1913, Short) – The Doctor's Wife
- Olaf—An Atom (1913, Short) – A Parent
- The Ranchero's Revenge (1913, Short) – The Schemer's Associate
- The Well (1913, Short) – The Farmer's Wife
- The Switch Tower (1913, Short) – The Switchman's Wife
- A Gamble with Death (1913, Short) – Kate
- The Enemy's Baby (1913, Short) – Miller's Wife
- A Gambler's Honor (1913, Short) – Beth
- The Mirror (1913, Short) – Daisy
- The Vengeance of Galora (1913, Short) – Galora
- Under the Shadow of the Law (1913, Short) – John Haywood's Sister
- I Was Meant for You (1913, Short) – Lavina
- The Crook and the Girl (1913, Short) – The Uncle's Adopted Daughter
- The Strong Man's Burden (1913, Short) – Ida Glynn, The Nurse
- The Stolen Treaty (1913, Short) – Olga
- The Law and His Son (1913, Short) – Marguerite, Manning's Sister
- A Tender-Hearted Crook (1913, Short) – Edith
- The Van Nostrand Tiara (1913, Short) – Kate
- The Stopped Clock (1913, Short) – The Antique Dealer's Daughter
- The Detective's Stratagem (1913, Short) – Kate, the Bank Clerk's Sweetheart
- All for Science (1913, Short) – Detective
- A Nest Unfeathered (1914, Short) – Kate
- Her Father's Silent Partner (1914, Short)
- The Cracksman's Gratitude (1914, Short)
- The Heart of a Bandit (1915, Short)
- The Sheriff's Dilemma (1915, Short) – Molly
- The Miser's Legacy (1915, Short) – The Crook's Wife
- The Gambler's I.O.U. (1915, Short) – Nell – Daddy Wilson's Daughter
- A Day's Adventure (1915, Short) – Hogan's Moll
- The Canceled Mortgage (1915, Short) – The Widowed Mother
- Truth Stranger Than Fiction (1915, Short) – Crook
- Her Dormant Love (1915, Short) – The Discontented Wife
- The Way Out (1915, Short) – The Young School Teacher
- Her Convert (1915, Short) – The Old Inventor's Daughter
- Old Offenders (1915, Short) – Joe's Wife
- As It Happened (1915, Short) – The Ranchman's Daughter
- A Stranger from Somewhere (1916) – Olga
- Mixed Blood (1916) – Nita Valyez
- The Right to Be Happy (1916) – Mrs. Cratchit
- The White Raven (1917) – Daisy
- The Gates of Doom (1917) – Indore / Agatha
- The Bronze Bride (1917) – A-Che-Chee
- The Clean-Up (1917) – Vera Vincent
- The Empty Gun (1917, Short) – Mary
- Fighting Back (1917) – The Fury
- The Ship of Doom (1917) – Clara Gove
- The Man Above the Law (1918) – Natchah
- Captain of His Soul (1918) – Annette De Searcy
- You Can't Believe Everything (1918) – Grace Dardley
- Closin' In (1918)
- The Return of Mary (1918) – Mrs. John Denby Sr.
- The Follies Girl (1919) – Nina
- Prudence on Broadway (1919) – Miss Grayson
- Chasing Rainbows (1919) – Mrs. Walters
- Heart o' the Hills (1919) – Martha Hawn
- The Feud (1919) – Mary Lynch
- The Woman in the Suitcase (1920) – Mrs. James B. Moreland
- The Gift Supreme (1920) – Lalia Graun
- The Devil's Riddle (1920) – Mrs. Potts
- Blind Youth (1920) – Elizabeth Monnier
- Through Eyes of Men (1920) – Mrs. Virginia All
- The Jack-Knife Man (1920) – Lize Merdin
- Something to Think About (1920) – Housekeeper
- The Mark of Zorro (1920) – Doña Catalina Pulido
- Midsummer Madness (1920) – Mrs. Osborne
- Prisoners of Love (1921) – Her Mother
- Chickens (1921) – Aunt Rebecca
- What Every Woman Knows (1921) – Comtesse de la Brière
- Mother o' Mine (1921) – Mrs. Sheldon
- Wealth (1921) – Mrs. Dominick
- Love Never Dies (1921) – Liz Trott
- Rent Free (1922) – Countess de Mourney
- The Gray Dawn (1922) – Mrs. Bennett
- Penrod (1922) – Mrs. Schofield
- The Ragged Heiress (1922) – Sylvia Moreton
- The Lying Truth (1922) – Mrs. Sam Clairborne
- Nice People (1922) – Margaret Rainsford
- In the Name of the Law (1922) – Mrs. O'Hara
- Heart's Haven (1922) – May Caroline
- Quincy Adams Sawyer (1922) – Mrs. Putnam
- The West~Bound Limited (1923) – Mrs. Bill Buckley
- Michael O'Halloran (1923) – Nancy Harding
- Human Wreckage (1923) – Mrs. Brown
- Circus Days (1923) – Martha
- Ashes of Vengeance (1923) – Margot's Aunt
- Ponjola (1923) – Mrs. Hope
- Enemies of Children (1923)
- Black Oxen (1923) – Agnes Trevor
- Judgment of the Storm (1924) – Mrs. Heath
- Leave It to Gerry (1924) – Mrs. Brent
- Thy Name Is Woman (1924) – Juan's Mother
- Secrets (1924) – Elizabeth Channing
- A Fight for Honor (1924) – Mrs. Hill
- Those Who Dare (1924) – Mrs. Rollins
- The Reckless Sex (1925) – Concha
- Waking Up the Town (1925) – Mrs. Joyce
- Dollar Down (1925) – Mrs. Meadows – Ruth's Sister
- The Tower of Lies (1925) – Katrina
- One of the Bravest (1925) – Mrs. Kelly
- The Big Parade (1925) – Mrs. Apperson
- The Midnight Flyer (1925) – Liza Slater
- Ben-Hur (1925) – Princess of Hur
- The Devil's Circus (1926) – Mrs. Peterson
- The Dixie Merchant (1926) – Josephine Fippany
- The Shamrock Handicap (1926) – Molly O'Shea
- The Unknown Soldier (1926) – John Phillips' sister
- The Show Off (1926) – Mom Fisher
- The Flaming Forest (1926) – Mrs. McTavish
- A Little Journey (1927) – Aunt Louise
- The Auctioneer (1927) – Mrs. Tim Eagan
- Cheaters (1927) – Mrs. Robin Carter
- The Taxi Dancer (1927) – Aunt Mary
- The Black Diamond Express (1927) – Martha Foster
- Tillie the Toiler (1927) – Ma Jones
- Winds of the Pampas (1927) – Doña Maria Casandos
- The Shield of Honor (1927) – Mrs. MacDowell
- Almost Human (1927) – Mrs. Livingston
- The Tragedy of Youth (1928) – Mother
- Don't Marry (1928) – Aunt Abigail Bowen
- 4 Devils (1928) – Woman
- The Viking (1928) – Lady Editha
- Marriage by Contract (1928) – Mother
- When Dreams Come True (1929) – Martha Shelby
- The Flying Fleet (1929) – Mrs. Hastings – Anita's Mother (uncredited)
- Silks and Saddles (1929) – Mrs. Calhoun
- The Quitter (1929) – Mrs. Abbott
- Whispering Winds (1929) – Mrs. Benton
- Redemption (1930) – Anna Pavlovna
- The Second Floor Mystery (1930) – Aunt Hattie
- Young Desire (1930) – Mrs. Spencer
- The Big House (1930) – Mrs. Marlowe
- Wild Company (1930) – Mrs. Laura Grayson
- Brothers (1930) – Mrs. Bess Naughton
- Mothers Cry (1930) – Mary's Mother (uncredited)
- An American Tragedy (1931) – Mrs. Samuel Griffiths
- Under Eighteen (1931) – Seamstress (uncredited)
- Manhattan Parade (1931) – Nancy – the Maid (uncredited)
- Union Depot (1932) – Little Boy's Mother (uncredited)
- The Famous Ferguson Case (1932) – The Brookses' Landlady (uncredited)
- Rebecca of Sunnybrook Farm (1932) – Mrs. Randall (uncredited)
- Cornered (1932) – Jane's Aunt
- The Phantom Express (1932) – Ma Nolan
- A Successful Calamity (1932) – Struthers' Secretary (uncredited)
- Lawyer Man (1932) – Gilmurry's Secretary (uncredited)
- Central Airport (1933) – Mrs. Blaine
- The Working Man (1933) – Benjamin's Secretary
- By Appointment Only (1933) – Mrs. Mary Carroll
- Paddy the Next Best Thing (1933) – Miss Breen (uncredited)
- Wild Boys of the Road (1933) – Mrs. Smith
- Bedside (1934) – Nurse (uncredited)
- It Happened One Night (1934) – Mother on Bus (uncredited)
- Journal of a Crime (1934) – Sister at Hospital (uncredited)
- Dr. Monica (1934) – Miss Bryerly (uncredited)
- British Agent (1934) – Woman Saying 'Lenin will Live' (uncredited)
- Two Heads on a Pillow (1934) – Mrs. Helen Gorman
- Imitation of Life (1934) – Teacher Outside Classroom (uncredited)
- Black Fury (1935) – Nurse (uncredited)
- Murder by Television (1935) – Mrs. Houghland
- August Week End (1936) – Alma Washburne
- Small Town Girl (1936) – Woman in Bed (uncredited)
- Criminal Lawyer (1937) – Night Court Judge (uncredited)
- Two-Fisted Sheriff (1937) – Miss Herrick – Molly's Aunt
- High, Wide, and Handsome (1937) – Seamstress (uncredited)
- Test Pilot (1938) – Funeral Home Associate (uncredited)
- Three Comrades (1938) – Landlady Frau Zalewski (uncredited)
- Boys Town (1938) – Catholic Nun (uncredited)
- Stand Up and Fight (1939) – Woman (uncredited)
- Idiot's Delight (1939) – Crying Mother (uncredited)
- Miracles for Sale (1939) – Jack of Diamonds Woman (uncredited)
- Thunder Afloat (1939) – Nurse (uncredited)
- Those High Grey Walls (1939) – Mother (uncredited)
- Joe and Ethel Turp Call on the President (1939) – Gossiper (uncredited)
- Young Tom Edison (1940) – Woman at Station (uncredited)
- The Captain Is a Lady (1940) – Old Lady (uncredited)
- The Golden Fleecing (1940) – Pedestrian (uncredited)
- Dr. Kildare Goes Home (1940) – Nurse for Mr. Winslow (uncredited)
- Third Finger, Left Hand (1940) – Witness at wedding (uncredited)
- Lady Scarface (1941) – Mrs. Tuckerman (uncredited)
- Reap the Wild Wind (1942) – Ettie (uncredited)
- Keeper of the Flame (1942) – Mourner (uncredited)
- The Youngest Profession (1943) – Woman (uncredited)
- The Human Comedy (1943) – Woman on Street (uncredited)
- Hangmen Also Die! (1943) – Counterwoman (uncredited)
- Presenting Lily Mars (1943) – Dowager (uncredited)
- This Land Is Mine (1943) – Woman in Bathroom (uncredited)
- Du Barry Was a Lady (1943) – Subway Passenger (uncredited)
- Black Market Rustlers (1943) – Mrs. Prescott (uncredited)
- Teen Age (1943) – Mrs. Mary Abbott
- Men on Her Mind (1944) – Mother Goodwin
- Andy Hardy's Blonde Trouble (1944) – Dr. Standish's Servant (uncredited)
- Are These Our Parents (1944) – Miss Winfield
- The Thin Man Goes Home (1944) – Train Passenger in Passageway (uncredited)
- Having Wonderful Crime (1945) – Guest (uncredited)
- Adventure (1945) – Woman in Library (uncredited)
