= As It Happened =

1915 film

- Directed by: Anthony O'Sullivan
- Starring: Harry Carey
- Release date: July 12, 1915
- Country: United States
- Languages: Silent; English intertitles

As It Happened is a 1915 American silent drama film featuring Harry Carey.

== Plot and reception ==
As It Happened was a one-reel Western romance, in which "the heroine's brother brings about the misunderstanding which makes love's path a thorny one." The Moving Picture World found the film "straightforward and interesting."

== Cast ==
- Harry Carey as The New Foreman
- Claire McDowell as the Ranchman's Daughter
- L. M. Wells (credited as Louis Wells) as the Ranchman

== See also ==
- List of American films of 1915
- Harry Carey filmography
