= The Law and His Son =

1913 film

- Directed by: Anthony O'Sullivan
- Written by: George A. Posner
- Starring: Harry Carey
- Production company: Biograph Company
- Distributed by: General Film Company
- Release date: September 22, 1913
- Country: United States
- Language: Silent with English intertitles

The Law and His Son is a 1913 American silent short drama film featuring Harry Carey.

== Plot ==
According to the copyright description, "In this picture the contrast of two fathers is shown. One believes his son guilty of a crime which he never committed and the other knows the weakness of his boy, but he uses every means possible to prevent him from further disgrace. Tom Manning had really served the sentence for which the son of his father’s business partner was guilty. The two boys had grown up together. One had always been a wayward youth and when funds were missing from the father's office, the evidence pointed to Tom. His father's business partner persuaded him to bring the case to court and his father, being of a proud, erratic nature permitted the law to take its course and Tom was sentenced to several years imprisonment. In the picture, we see Tom coming out from prison, his term expired. Henry, the son of his father's business partner, is shown at a gambling house where he loses heavily money which his father has given him. He receives a note from his father which reads-"My boy, I fear you are near the danger line again. Remember Manning has just finished serving a prison term that was yours by right. Come home, I want a word with you. Your affectionate father." Henry shows the letter to his companions and in gay and in different spirits returns to his father. In the meantime, Tom has found a boardinghouse. There influenced by the letter which he had received from his sister the day he left prison, begging him to write their father that he wished to come home, he sat down and writes-"Dear Father: I still swear before God I am innocent of that crime which seems to be fastened so hopelessly around me. Someday I hope, to prove it. Now all I ask is a chance. Write and let me know if you want me to come home, your loving son Tom Manning."

When the father receives the letter he is obdurate, but upon much coaxing from the mother and sister, he finally consents to permit his son to return. The sister writes a letter to him to that effect. Meanwhile, Henry has promised his father to reform, begged more money of him and returned to his friends where he has spent it in cool indifference to his promises. Tom returns home the night that his father is giving a reception to his business partner. He meets Henry and his father as he comes in, the very men who have been instrumental in his serving the unjust prison term. His father refuses to have anything to do with him, but the sister promises to intercede in his behalf. The guests have begun to arrive when she appears before her father and asks him to come and speak with Tom. He goes. Tom asks to be reinstated in society once more and to be given another chance. But the father, thinking of the disgrace, refuses. At this point his business partner enters the room and Tom goes dejectedly upstairs. "I advise you to change the combination of that safe"-says the business partner-"You know, as well as I the weakness of Tom, and it is better that he should not be permitted to play with fire again." A new combination is made out between them, but in being called into the next room, the father leaves the combination on the table. Henry comes into the room after their departure and finds the combination. He attempts to open the safe but is confronted by Tom who has crept noiselessly down the stairs. A struggle ensues. The two fathers and the sister come into the room. Tom is naturally suspected and sent back to his room.

The father and sister return to the guests, "but the partner ever suspicious of his son's weakness, now looks into the young man's guilty eyes. "Hand me over that paper, you young scamp."- and the guilty youth complies. In order to save his son from disgrace he sends him from the room and places the crumpled combination again on the table. As he does this he is seen by Tom coming downstairs. In order to save his own honor and that of his son, there is only one thing left to do-he must transfer the suspcions [sic] to Tom. He leaves the combination there upon the table fully convinced that Tom will return to steal it. In the next room he informs the father that the real thief will doubtless return for the combination. Presently the curtain parted and Henry is seen creeping into the darkened room. He finds the combination and goes to the safe. The father and his business partner peep into the room. A shot is fired and Henry falls to the floor unconscious. Later, as he dies in his father's arms, he confesses that he is not only guilty of this crime,"but of the one which had sent Tom to prison."

== Cast ==
- Harry Carey as Manning
- Claire McDowell as Marguerite, Manning's Sister
- Reggie Morris as The Outcast Son
- William J. Butler as The Outcast Son's Father
- Frank Evans as Prison Official
- Hector Sarno as In Club

== See also ==
- Harry Carey filmography
