= Her Father's Silent Partner =

1914 film

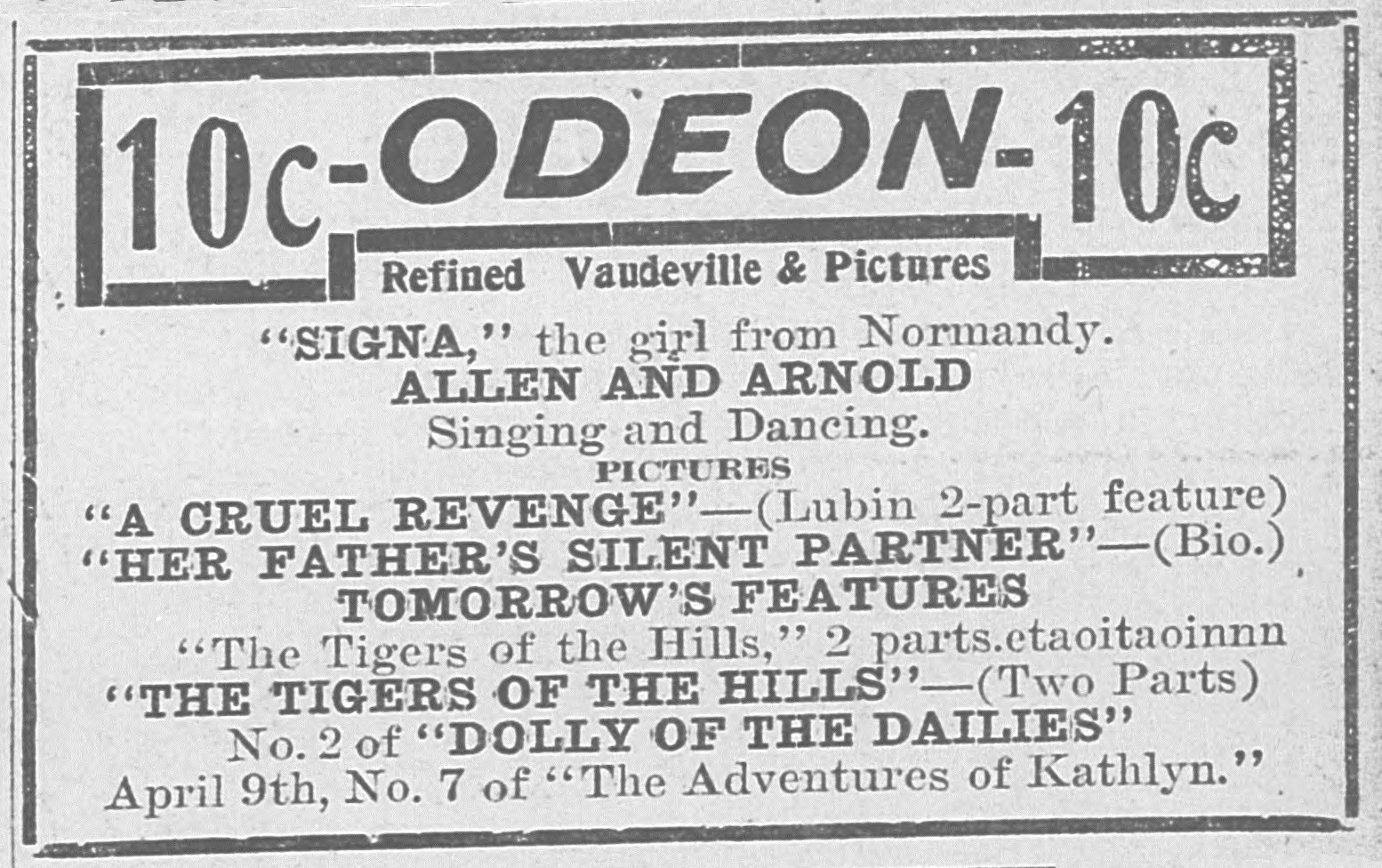
- A contemporary simple advertisement in a newspaper for several films, including Her Father's Silent Partner
- Directed by: Donald Crisp
- Written by: Belle Taylor
- Starring: Harry Carey
- Production company: Biograph Company
- Distributed by: General Film Company
- Release date: February 23, 1914
- Running time: 10 minutes
- Country: United States
- Language: Silent with English intertitles

Her Father's Silent Partner is a 1914 American silent short drama film directed by Donald Crisp and featuring Harry Carey.

== Plot ==
According to the copyright description, "John Arnold owned and operated a swell jewelry shop on Fifth Avenue and was associated with a hand of robbers (indirectly), thugs of the lower east side, headed by handsome Bob Harvey. Arnold who moved in high society had introduced Bob into his set for the purpose of more easily robbing the rich at receptions. Arnold would buy the loot, reset it and sell back to the owners. Now that Arnold has attained wealth and social position he begins to wish he could get away from his connection with Bob, especially as his 20 year old daughter is returning home from several years study abroad. He wishes to have nothing in his life to jeopardize her chance for happiness. She returns and soon after Arnold leaves for a short business trip.

During his absence Grace attends a reception and there meets Bob who falls in love with her and decides to marry her. Grace is a little fascinated by him for he had a certain amount of magnetism. Bob persisted in his intentions and the evening of Arnold's return, called on Grace, and the two men met face to face. Bob was rather amused at Arnold's distress and after a dramatic moment, he retired to his study to bitterly repent of his past and to think of a way out of it all. The next day he had an interview with Bob and declared he would shoot him if he tried to see his daughter. Bob answered him that he was just as good as Arnold, that he loved Grace and that he intended to marry her. He refused to be bribed and Arnold was in an awful state, for as bad as he was, he loved Grace. He decided to rid himself of Bob. He discovered Bob was on the outs with a bunch of thugs who had been aiding him, and afraid they might know something of him-he decided to get them all under lock and key. He phoned to one telling him Bob would have a large amount of money the next day and that by calling at his apartments at 2 o'clock, they could make him divide. Previously he had gone to the saloon, their meeting place, and overheard them berate Bob, who refused an equal division of the spoils.

The next day he sent Bob a note saying he would call at 2 o'clock to arrange things. Bob thought he was afraid of him and was going to yield. At half past one Arnold telephoned to police headquarters stating where and when they could catch a bunch of thieves. For fear of Bob getting suspicious and leaving the house, he called him up and engaged him in a fake talk. During this the thugs surprised Bob who dropped the receiver and threw up his hands. Arnold heard the argument over the phone, then the struggle with the police. He was congratulating himself when he heard that Bob had escaped. He knew he would revenge himself and hurried Grace into the auto, trying to make the train. Too late-they sped on until a tire blew up near a signal station. Here Bob overtook them. Arnold placed Grace in shadow, kissed her and met Bob face to face. Both drew revolvers. Grace rushed in, collided with Bob's elbow. Bob fell and died at his own hand, while Arnold's bullet missed aim. Arnold and his daughter left on an outgoing train."

== Cast ==
- Harry Carey
- Claire McDowell
- Dorothy Gish
- Lionel Barrymore

== See also ==
- Harry Carey filmography
- Lionel Barrymore filmography
