= Mixed Blood (1916 film) =

1916 film

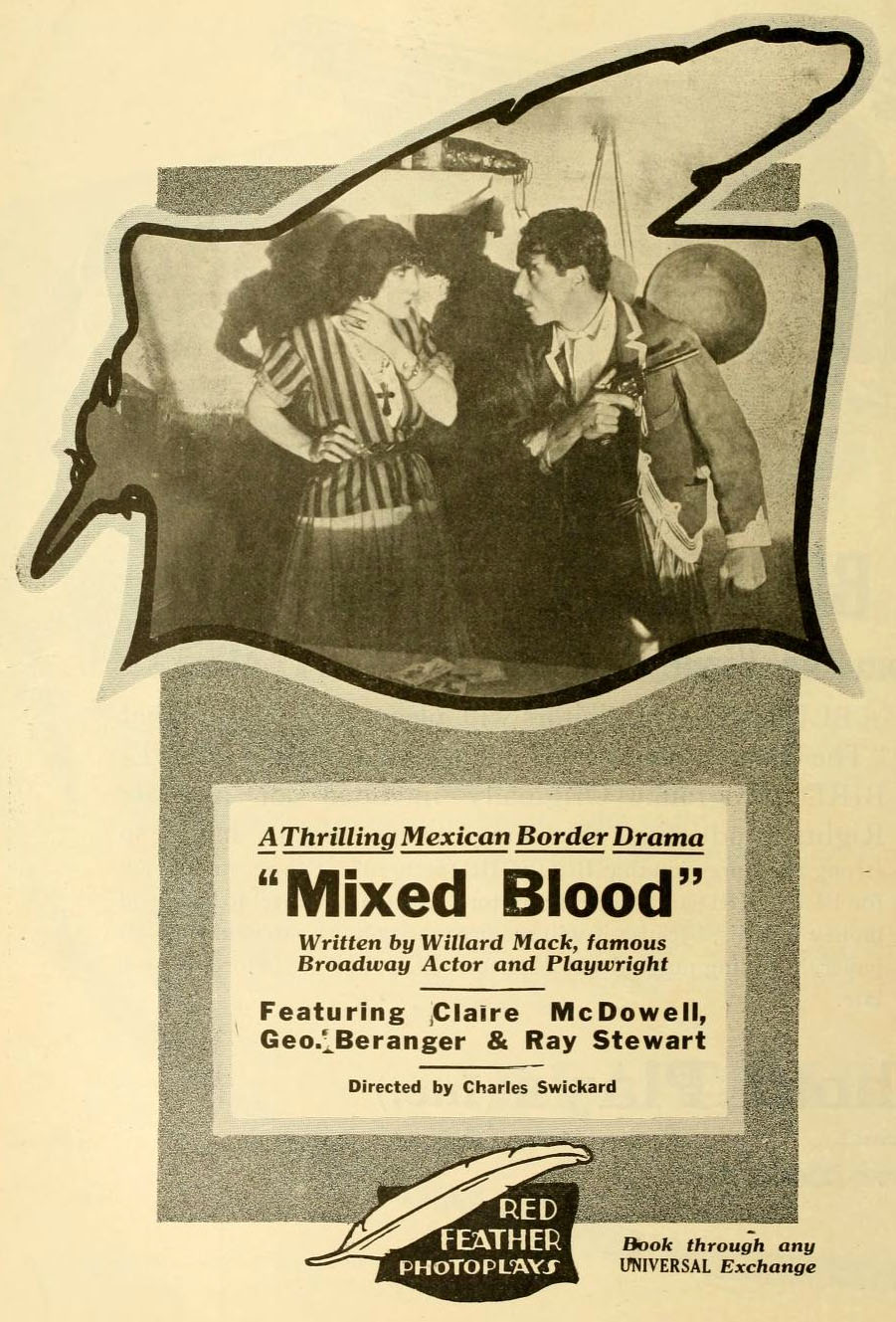
- Advertisement
- Directed by: Charles Swickard
- Starring: Claire McDowell; George Beranger
- Cinematography: Harry McGuire Stanley
- Production company: Universal Film Manufacturing Company
- Distributed by: Universal Film Manufacturing Company
- Release date: December 18, 1916
- Running time: 5 reels
- Country: United States
- Languages: Silent; English intertitles

Mixed Blood is a lost 1916 Western film directed by Charles Swickard, and starring Claire McDowell. The film was both produced and distributed by Universal Film.

== Plot ==
Nita Valyez, half Spanish and half Irish, is both attracted and disgusted by Carlos, a violent and dangerous man. At the same time, Sheriff Big Jim takes a lukewarm interest in her. When Carlos kills a trader, he forces her to flee with him. Jim, having set out on their trail, finds them in a small town on the border where an epidemic is raging. Carlos is dying and Nita takes care of him with great devotion. Jim, though touched by her manifestation of love, takes Nita away from her, both to save her and to convince her to love him.

== Cast ==
- Claire McDowell as Nita Valyez
- George Beranger as Carlos
- Roy Stewart as Big Jim
- Wilbur Higby as Joe Nagle
- Jessie Arnold as Lottie Nagle
- Harry Archer as Blootch White

== Preservation ==
With no holdings located in archives, Mixed Blood is considered a lost film.
