= The Millionaire's Double =

1917 film

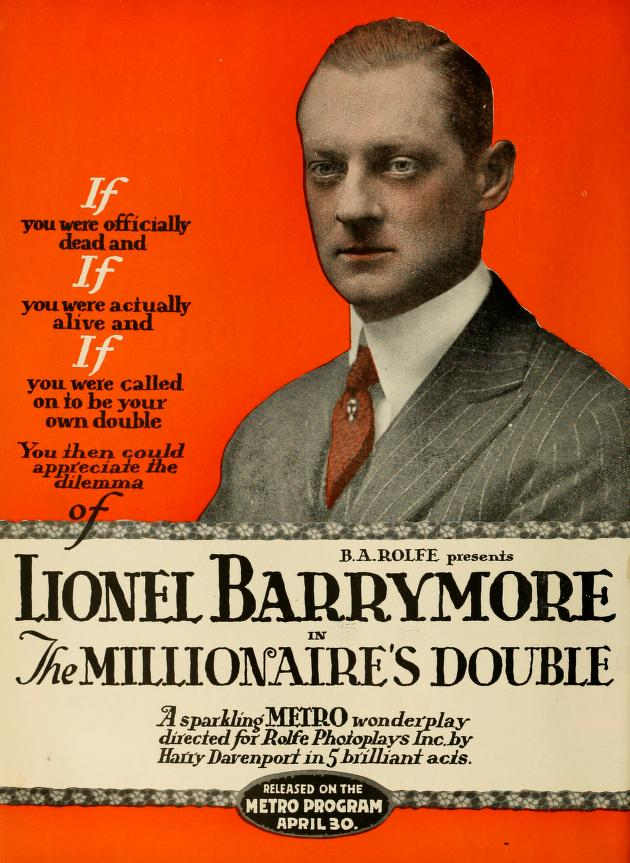
- Film poster
- Directed by: Harry Davenport
- Written by: June Mathis
- Produced by: B. A. Rolfe
- Starring: Lionel Barrymore; Evelyn Brent
- Cinematography: John M. Bauman
- Distributed by: Metro Pictures
- Release date: April 30, 1917
- Running time: Five reels
- Country: United States
- Language: Silent

The Millionaire's Double is a 1917 silent American drama film directed by Harry Davenport, starring Lionel Barrymore and Evelyn Brent. The film is considered to be lost.

== Cast ==
- Lionel Barrymore as Bide Bennington
- Evelyn Brent as Constance Brent
- Harry Northrup as Richard Glendon (as Harry S. Northrup)
- H. H. Pattee as James Brent
- John Smiley as Stevens
- John Raymond as 'Kid' Burns (as Jack Raymond)
- Louis Wolheim as Bob Holloway

== See also ==
- Lionel Barrymore filmography
