= A Dangerous Foe =

1913 film

- Directed by: Anthony O'Sullivan
- Written by: Edward Acker
- Starring: Charles Hill Mailes
- Release date: May 29, 1913
- Country: United States
- Language: Silent with English intertitles

A Dangerous Foe is a 1913 American drama film featuring Harry Carey, billed as "a thrilling Chinese story."

== Cast ==
- Charles Hill Mailes as The Judge
- Harry Carey as "The Bull"
- John T. Dillon as The Bull's Friend

== See also ==
- List of American films of 1913
- Harry Carey filmography
