= A Gambler's Honor =

1913 film

- Directed by: Anthony O'Sullivan
- Written by: Harry Carey
- Starring: Harry Carey
- Release date: July 14, 1913
- Country: United States
- Language: Silent with English intertitles

A Gambler's Honor is a 1913 silent film featuring Harry Carey.

== Plot ==
This description comes from the Library of Congress copyright registration. It is truncated at the beginning because the file was damaged.

[A young man realizes] that he had been appropriating the company's funds altogether too freely, and that now he was in danger of losing, not only his position, but his honor and that of his sister as well. It worried him and that evening he refused to eat, much to the worry of his sister. However, the evening found him at the gambling house determined to win back the shortage, if possible. His first round of cards with the gambler was a failure, but realizing that great stakes were at issue, he determined to go back to the Express Office and appropriate more of the company's funds. It was his one last chance. The gambler who had a deep regard for the young man, owing to his love for the sister, was suspicious of his actions and followed him. He saw him take the money from the safe and return to the gambling house, so he determined upon a plan to save him. He placed a mirror in the bottom of a drinking glass and as he dealt the cards, the reflection came into the mirror and he saw what cards went to the other man. Thus he fleeced him, and got back all the money appropriated from the company. In despair the young express agent stumbled out of the gambling house and into the darkness, but the gambler went back to the Express Office and opening the safe from the combination he had previously learned, he placed the money back into the safe. The sheriff who was passing at this point, saw the light in the Express Office and made investigation. In the shuffle the gambler escaped through the window and was soon on the sheriff's horse and out in the country. The sheriff and his posse returned. Meanwhile, the sister at home, who had become anxious on account of her brother's failure to return, went to the gambling house and not finding him there, returned. On the way, she came upon his dead body and in his hand was a card. It read: "I have disgraced us both." (unintelligible after this)

— Harry Carey, photoplay writer

== Cast ==
- Harry Carey as The Gambler
- Claire McDowell as Beth
- Henry B. Walthall as Beth's Brother
- William A. Carroll as In Bar
- John T. Dillon as In Bar
- Charles West as In Bar

== See also ==
- Harry Carey filmography
