= The Strong Man's Burden =

1913 film

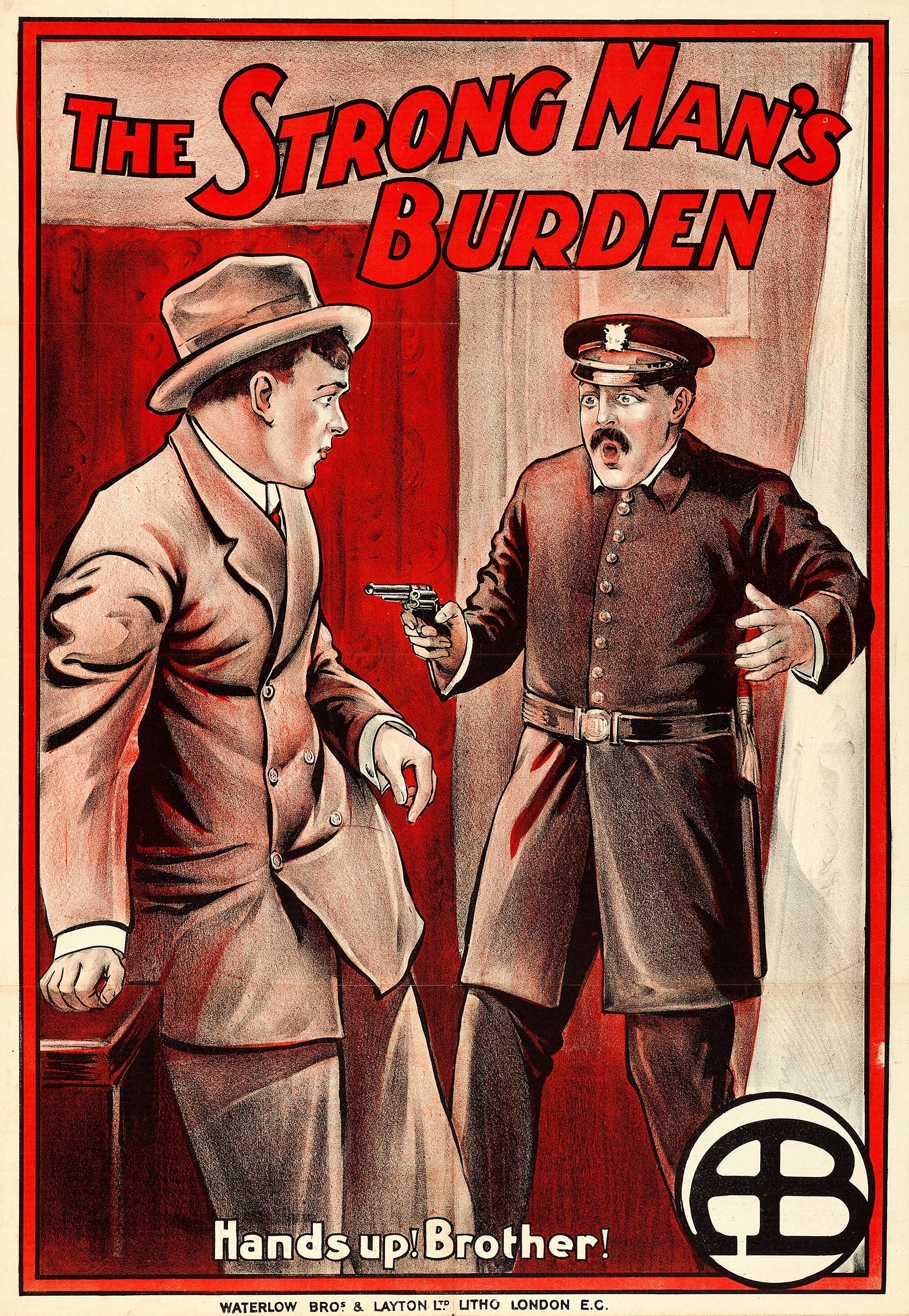
- lobby poster for the film, designed by Lionel Barrymore
- Directed by: Anthony O'Sullivan
- Written by: George Hennessy
- Starring: Kate Bruce
- Distributed by: General Film Company
- Release date: September 6, 1913
- Country: United States
- Language: Silent with English intertitles

The Strong Man's Burden is a 1913 American drama film featuring Harry Carey. It was produced by the Biograph Company and distributed through the General Film Company.

== Cast ==
- Kate Bruce as Bob & John's Mother
- Harry Carey as Bob
- Lionel Barrymore as John
- William J. Butler as The Doctor
- Claire McDowell as The Nurse

== See also ==
- Harry Carey filmography
- Lionel Barrymore filmography
