= A Tender-Hearted Crook =

1913 film

- Directed by: Anthony O'Sullivan
- Written by: James G. Steven
- Starring: Charles West
- Distributed by: Biograph Company
- Release date: October 2, 1913
- Country: United States
- Language: Silent with English intertitles

A Tender-Hearted Crook is a 1913 American drama film directed by Anthony O'Sullivan, featuring Harry Carey and Claire McDowell. A couple breaks up, leaving the young woman desperate; a burglar brings them back together.

== Cast ==
- Charles West as James (credited as Charles H. West)
- Claire McDowell as Edith
- Harry Carey as The Thief
- Hector Dion as The Minister
- Marion Leonard
- Wilfred Lucas

== See also ==
- Harry Carey filmography
