= Old Offenders =

1915 film

- Directed by: Anthony O'Sullivan
- Starring: Harry Carey
- Production company: Biograph Company
- Release date: July 10, 1915
- Country: United States
- Language: Silent with English intertitles

Old Offenders is a 1915 American silent short drama film featuring Harry Carey.

== Plot ==
According to the copyright description, "Under police espionage, Crooked Joe is living with his wife and baby when Norris, his former pal, tries to interest him in a job. He refuses, and subsequently earns his old pal's animosity when Norris makes advances to his wife. Norris "frames" Joe, and he is sent to prison on a charge of robbing his employers. His wife leaves her baby at the doorstep of a wealthy family's and subsequently dies. The Nortons adopt the child, and she grows to womanhood. Dick Ross, a society crook, wins her love. Norris, now a genteel cardsharp and friend of Dick, holds the latter's I.O.U.'s for a large amount and forces him to steal the Barnato diamond necklace from Miss Norton. Joe, appointed butler in the Norton home, recognises his daughter. He gets wind of the deal between Norris and Ross, and goes down to the lake, where the two are to meet. Norris,surprised, leaps into the lake and is drowned. Joe returns to the house, where a reception is in progress. Miss Norton misses her diamonds, which Dick has cleverly unclasped from about her neck. The guests are thrown into consternation by the arrival of detectives. Joe is suspected, but the police fail to find the diamonds and are completely at a loss. Then Joe steps forward. Knowing that Dick has the necklace in his pocket, he exposes him, and feels that at last he has justified his claim to honesty, besides being happily re-united with his daughter."

== Cast ==
- Harry Carey as Norris
- Claire McDowell
- Anthony O'Sullivan
- Charles West (credited as Charles H. West)

== See also ==
- Harry Carey filmography
