= The Van Nostrand Tiara =

1913 film

- Directed by: Anthony O'Sullivan
- Written by: Clarence A. Frambers
- Starring: Reggie Morris
- Release date: October 20, 1913
- Country: United States
- Language: Silent with English intertitles

The Van Nostrand Tiara is a 1913 American silent film featuring Harry Carey. It is the second such film to feature the thief character A. J. Raffles, following 1905's Raffles, the Amateur Cracksman.

== Plot ==
A. J. Raffles, described by publicity of the day as "a society crook," wants to steal Mrs. Van Nostrand's tiara, so he persuades a female accomplice to pretend to be her maid. He disguises himself as a woman and visits the "maid." Then he substitutes the tiara's diamonds with fake stones. A detective learns of the fraud and arrests the perpetrators. Then the detective discovers the diamonds hiding in the heel of the imposter maid's boot.

== Cast ==
- Reggie Morris as A. J. Raffles
- Claire McDowell as Kate
- Harry Carey as Society Detective
- Hattie Delaro

== See also ==
- Harry Carey filmography
