= The Cracksman's Gratitude =

1914 American silent film short

- Directed by: Anthony O'Sullivan
- Starring: Lionel Barrymore; Claire McDowell
- Production company: Biograph Company
- Distributed by: General Film Company
- Release date: July 4, 1914
- Country: United States

The Cracksman's Gratitude is a 1914 American drama silent black and white film directed by Anthony O'Sullivan and starring Lionel Barrymore and Claire McDowell.

== See also ==
- Lionel Barrymore filmography
