= All for Science =

1913 film

- Directed by: Anthony O'Sullivan
- Written by: Albert Glassmire
- Starring: Reggie Morris
- Distributed by: General Film Company
- Release date: November 24, 1913
- Country: United States
- Language: Silent with English intertitles

All for Science is a 1913 American silent drama film featuring Harry Carey.

== Plot ==
All for Science is a one-reel film about "an old man who became a thief so that his young friend could follow his scientific inclinations." The "old man" is a butler who steals from his employer to fund his desperate nephew's chemistry research. The nephew is indiscreet with his new wealth, and detectives soon discover the crime.

== Cast ==
- Reggie Morris as The Chemist
- Harry Carey as The Young Man
- Joseph McDermott as The Detective
- Lionel Barrymore as In Detective Agency
- Claire McDowell as In Detective Agency
- Charles West as In Restaurant

== Reception ==
The Moving Picture World found All for Science "weak", but praised Claire McDowell's performance as the "lady detective".

== See also ==
- List of American films of 1913
- Harry Carey filmography
- Lionel Barrymore filmography
