= Her Convert =

1915 film

- Directed by: Anthony O'Sullivan
- Starring: Harry Carey
- Production company: Biograph Company
- Release date: June 24, 1915
- Country: United States
- Language: Silent with English intertitles

Her Convert is a 1915 American silent short drama film featuring Harry Carey.

== Plot ==
According to the copyright description, "The old inventor's daughter is a mission worker; she makes a convert of a young crook and eventually becomes engaged to marry him. But her father does not approve of him, and shows him the door when he learns from a detective the record of his daughter's suitor. The inventor's plans are stolen by an unscrupulous manufacturer, and the crook volunteers to recover them. He breaks into the man's office and opens the safe. The manufacturer enters and surprises him at work. He dives through the window, followed by a shot. Some minutes later he staggers into the girl's home and restores the plans to her father. The bullet has found its mark, but he is not wounded, thanks to the little book she gave him, which he has been carrying in his breast pocket. His daring action in recovering the plans wins the old man's confidence, and he reaps the reward of his efforts to go straight. The plans are accepted by another manufacturer, and the inventor's labors are crowned with financial success."

== Cast ==
- Harry Carey as The Converted Cracksman
- Claire McDowell
- Charles West (credited as Charles H. West)

== See also ==
- Harry Carey filmography
