= The Switch Tower =

1913 film

- Directed by: Anthony O'Sullivan
- Written by: George Hennessy
- Starring: Henry B. Walthall
- Distributed by: General Film Company
- Release date: June 16, 1913
- Country: United States
- Language: Silent with English intertitles

The Switch Tower is a 1913 American drama film featuring Lionel Barrymore and Harry Carey.

== Cast ==
- Henry B. Walthall as The Switchman
- Claire McDowell as The Switchman's Wife
- Marion Emmons as The Switchman's Son
- Lionel Barrymore as First Counterfeiter
- Charles West as Second Counterfeiter
- John T. Dillon as Third Counterfeiter
- William A. Carroll as First Federal Agent
- Frank Evans as Second Federal Agent
- George Beranger as A Tramp
- Anthony O'Sullivan as The Storekeeper
- Harry Carey (unconfirmed)

== See also ==
- Harry Carey filmography
- Lionel Barrymore filmography
