= The Greaser's Gauntlet =

1908 film directed by D. W. Griffith

- Directed by: D. W. Griffith
- Written by: D. W. Griffith; Stanner E. V. Taylor
- Starring: Wilfred Lucas
- Cinematography: Arthur Marvin
- Release date: August 11, 1908
- Running time: 17 minutes (one reel)
- Country: United States
- Language: Silent

The Greaser's Gauntlet is a 1908 American silent short adventure film directed by D. W. Griffith. It was released by the Biograph Company and copyrighted on August 6, 1908. The film introduced the first extended use of parallel editing in Griffith's work.

== Plot ==
The film begins as Jose, a young Mexican man, leaves his home in the Sierra Madre Mountains in order to make his way in the United States. Before he leaves, his mother presents him with a pair of gauntlets embroidered with a cross, which are intended to be a reminder of her love as well as what she has taught him: "to be temperate, honest, and dispassionate; to bear the burden of life's cross with fortitude and patience."

The film then moves on a tavern on the border, populated by cowboys, miners and railroad construction employees. Tom Berkeley is the engineer of the construction company, and his fiancée Mildred West has just arrived from New York. Bill Gates, an assistant engineer, secretly loves Mildred, though she rebuffs his unwanted advances.

Mildred and Tom's entry in the tavern draws everyone's attention, during which a Chinese servant steals money from a group of cowboys playing poker and plants the cowboy's bandanna at Jose's feet. Jose mistakenly picks it up, thinking it is his own, and exits. The robbery is subsequently discovered and blame is placed on Jose. An angry mob subsequently drags him out to be lynched, despite his pleas of innocence, which Mildred believes. Jose is dragged off to the woods and a rope placed around his neck. He asks for the chance to say a final prayer.

The film then cuts back to Mildred at the hotel, feeling pity for Jose. As she comes out of her hotel room, she suddenly spies the Chinese servant hiding the money he has stolen, revealing that he is the real thief. She snatches the money and runs to the site of the lynching, arriving just as Jose is raised into the air. She causes the mob to drop the rope, and Jose is released uninjured. After she explains what truly happened and returns the money to the cowboy, the mob leaves to chase after the servant, leaving Mildred and Jose alone. As a gesture of his deep gratitude he gives her one of the gauntlets and swears that if she ever needs his help, he will come to her rescue.

Time passes by, during which Jose falls into drinking. The railroad contracts have finally been completed, and a party is thrown in honor of Tom Berkeley. Bill Gates attends and continues to make advances on Mildred, now Tom's wife. After he does not give up, she screams and calls Tom to her side, who attacks Bill and ejects him from the party, who swears to get his vengeance. Bill heads to the tavern and finds Jose, drunk, who with another accomplice helps Bill attack Tom's carriage on its way home from the party. They knock Tom out, then abduct Mildred and take her to the tavern. Jose leaves to continue drinking, during which time Mildred unsuccessfully attempts to escape and is blocked by Bill. When Jose returns, he suddenly sees the gauntlet on the floor, which Mildred dropped in her struggle with Bill. Realizing who she is, he attacks Bill and kills him as Tom and his friends burst into the room to save her. Mildred thanks Jose for aiding in her rescue, and Jose resolves to return to his mother in the mountains. The film ends with Jose fulfilling this promise and returning to his loving mother's arms.

== Cast ==
- Wilfred Lucas as Jose
- Arthur V. Johnson as Tom Berkeley
- Marion Leonard as Mildred West
- Charles Inslee as Bill Gates
- Linda Arvidson as Woman on Street / Party Guest
- Kate Bruce
- John T. Dillon
- George Gebhardt as Chinese Waiter / Party Guest
- Anthony O'Sullivan as Bartender
- Harry Solter as Kidnapper / Party Guest
