= John T. Dillon (actor) =

American actor (1876–1937)

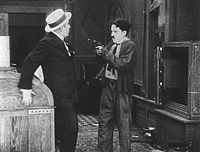
- Dillon (left) with Charlie Chaplin in The New Janitor (1914)
- Born: June 19, 1876; New York City, New York, U.S.
- Died: December 29, 1937 (aged 61); Los Angeles, California, U.S.
- Years active: 1908–1936

John T. Dillon (June 19, 1876 – December 29, 1937) was an American actor of the silent era. He appeared in more than 130 films between 1908 and 1936. He died in Los Angeles, California from pneumonia.

Dillon was born in New York City. Actor Edward Dillon was his brother, and he had a sister, Marcella. They are not related to director John Francis Dillon.

Dillon's work on stage included acting on Broadway in The Bishop's Carriage (1907).

Dillon was a veteran of the Spanish-American War. He had a wife, Wilhelmina, and he died of pneumonia on December 29, 1937, in a soldiers' home.

== Selected filmography ==
- The Greaser's Gauntlet (1908)
- In the Border States (1910)
- What the Daisy Said (1910)
- A Flash of Light (1910)
- The House with Closed Shutters (1910)
- A Mohawk's Way (1910) as Trapper
- Fisher Folks (1911)
- His Trust Fulfilled (1911)
- What Shall We Do with Our Old? (1911)
- The Crooked Road (1911)
- The Primal Call (1911)
- The Indian Brothers (1911)
- Out from the Shadow (1911)
- The Transformation of Mike (1912)
- Blind Love (1912)
- The Musketeers of Pig Alley (1912)
- His Auto's Maiden Trip (1912)
- Gold and Glitter (1912)
- The Root of Evil (1912)
- My Baby (1912)
- The Informer (1912)
- Brutality (1912)
- My Hero (1912)
- The New York Hat (1912)
- The Burglar's Dilemma (1912)
- A Cry for Help (1912)
- The God Within (1912)
- Three Friends (1913)
- The Telephone Girl and the Lady (1913)
- A Misappropriated Turkey (1913)
- Oil and Water (1913)
- A Chance Deception (1913)
- Love in an Apartment Hotel (1913)
- Fate (1913)
- The Sheriff's Baby (1913)
- The Hero of Little Italy (1913)
- The Wanderer (1913)
- The Tenderfoot's Money (1913)
- Olaf—An Atom (1913)
- A Dangerous Foe (1913)
- Red Hicks Defies the World (1913)
- The Switch Tower (1913)
- The Mothering Heart (1913)
- In Diplomatic Circles (1913)
- The Enemy's Baby (1913)
- A Gambler's Honor (1913)
- The Mirror (1913)
- The Vengeance of Galora (1913)
- Under the Shadow of the Law (1913)
- I Was Meant for You (1913)
- A Woman in the Ultimate (1913)
- A Modest Hero (1913)
- The Tender Hearted Boy (1913)
- Almost a Wild Man (1913)
- Brute Force (1914)
- The New Janitor (1914)
- The Tear That Burned (1914)
- The Lost Bridegroom (1916)
- A Girl Like That (1917)
- A Case at Law (1917)
- A Rich Man's Plaything (1917)
- The Embarrassment of Riches (1918)
- All Woman (1918)
- Putting One Over (1919)
- She Loves and Lies (1920)
- The Journey's End (1921)
- Midnight Molly (1925)
