= George Beranger =

Australian actor (1893–1973)

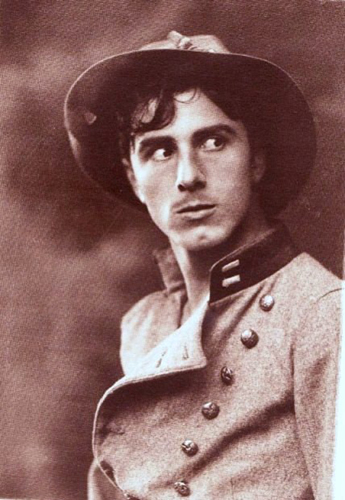
- Beranger in D. W. Griffith's The Birth of a Nation (1915)
- Born: George Augustus Beringer; 27 March 1893; Enmore, New South Wales, Australia
- Died: 8 March 1973 (aged 79); Laguna Beach, California
- Occupations: Actor, film director, film writer
- Years active: 1913–1950

George Beranger (27 March 1893 – 8 March 1973), was an Australian-born silent film actor, director and film writer in New York and Hollywood. He is also sometimes credited under the pseudonym George Andre de Beranger and multiple variations of the same.

== Early life ==
Beranger was born George Augustus Beringer in Enmore, New South Wales, Australia, the youngest of five sons of Caroline Mondientz and Adam Beringer, a German engine fitter. His mother committed suicide when he was three years old and he left home at the age of 14. He studied acting at the College of Elocution and Dramatic Art founded by Scottish actor Walter Bentley.

== Career ==
Beranger began playing Shakespearean roles at the age of sixteen with the Walter Bentley Players. He then emigrated from Australia to California, United States in 1912 and worked in the silent film industry in Hollywood. According to a researcher, he "reinvented himself in Hollywood, claiming French parentage, birth on a French ocean liner off the coast of Australia and a Paris education." Beranger worked under the name George Andre de Beranger and multiple variations of the same pseudonym.

By the 1920s, Beranger had become a star, appearing in the movies of Ernst Lubitsch and D. W. Griffith. He also directed sixteen films between 1914 and 1924. Beranger owned a large Spanish-style home in Laguna Beach, rented a room at the Hollywood Athletic Club and owned an apartment in Paris, France.

Beranger eventually appeared in more than 160 films between 1913 and 1950. Beranger's career declined following the 1930s Great Depression and the advent of sound film. He supplemented his income as a draftsman for the Los Angeles City Council. He sold his large properties and moved into a modest cottage beside his house in Laguna Beach.

Beranger's silent roles had often been sophisticates or dandy types, and in early sound films he was often relegated to non-speaking walk-ons or bit parts as hairdressers, concierges, florists and the like. However, in the mid and late 1940s, he played interesting speaking bit parts in three 20th Century-Fox (his main studio) film noirs: The Spider (a B noir in which he has several lines as a nosy apartment manager), Nightmare Alley (an all-time classic noir, playing the geek in the first act and singing the Irish drinking song "The Boston Burglar") and Road House (for which he received a rare screen credit, in spite of having only two lines of dialogue as Richard Widmark's bespectacled fishing buddy, "Lefty").

Beranger entered into a "lavender marriage" with a neighbouring woman who was a widow, but they never shared the same house and he continued to have sexual relationships with men unabated.

Beranger retired in 1952 and lived his later years in seclusion. He was found dead of natural causes in his home on 8 March 1973.

== Selected filmography ==
- The Well (1913 short) as The Accomplice
- The Switch Tower (1913 short) as A Tramp
- When Love Forgives (1913 short) as The Bartender
- Almost a Wild Man (1913) as In Audience (uncredited)
- Home, Sweet Home (1914) as The Accordion Player
- The Birth of a Nation (1915) as Wade Cameron – Second Son
- The Absentee (1915) as Tom Burke / Ambition
- Let Katie Do It (1916) as Witness to Accident (uncredited)
- The Good Bad-Man (1916) as Thomas Stuart
- Flirting with Fate (1916) as Automatic Joe
- The Half-Breed (1916) as Jack Brace
- Pillars of Society (1916) as Johan Tonnesen
- Intolerance (1916) as High Priest of Bel
- Manhattan Madness (1916) as The Butler
- Mixed Blood (1916) as Carlos
- Those Without Sin (1917) as Chester Wallace
- A Love Sublime (1917) as Her Husband
- A Daughter of the Poor (1917) as Rudolph Creig
- Time Locks and Diamonds (1917) as Ramon Mendoza
- The Spotted Lily (1917) as Captain Franz
- Sandy (1918) as Carter Nelson
- Broken Blossoms (1919) as The Spying One
- A Manhattan Knight (1920, director)
- Burn 'Em Up Barnes (1921, director)
- Sinister Street (1922, director)
- Was She Guilty? (1922, director)
- The Leopardess (1923) as Pepe
- The Bright Shawl (1923) as Andre Escobar
- Ashes of Vengeance (1923) as Charles IX
- Dulcy (1923) as Vincent Leach
- The Extra Girl (1923) as Actor in Wardrobe Line
- Tiger Rose (1923) as Pierre
- The Man Life Passed By (1923) as Leo Friend
- Poisoned Paradise: The Forbidden Story of Monte Carlo (1924) as Krantz
- Beau Brummel (1924) as Lord Byron
- His Hour (1924) as English Nobleman
- Beauty and the Bad Man (1925) as L.I.B. Bell
- Confessions of a Queen (1925) as Lewin
- Are Parents People? (1925) as Maurice Mansfield
- The Man in Blue (1925) as Carlo Guido
- Grounds for Divorce (1925) as Guido
- A Woman's Faith (1925) as Leandre Turcott
- The Big Parade (1925) as Patriotic Letter Reader (uncredited)
- The Grand Duchess and the Waiter (1926) as The Grand Duke Paul
- Miss Brewster's Millions (1926) as Mr. Brent
- The Bat (1926) as Gideon Bell
- So This Is Paris (1926) as Maurice Lalle
- Fig Leaves (1926) as Josef André
- The Eagle of the Sea (1926) as John Jarvis
- The Lady of the Harem (1926) as Selim
- The Popular Sin (1926) as Alphonse Martin
- Paradise for Two (1927) as Maurice
- Altars of Desire (1927) as Count André D'Orville
- The Small Bachelor (1927) as Finch
- If I Were Single (1927) as Claude
- Powder My Back (1928) as Claude
- Five and Ten Cent Annie (1928) as Orchestra Leader
- Beware of Bachelors (1928) as Claude de Brie
- Stark Mad (1929) as Simpson – Guide
- Strange Cargo (1929) as First Stranger
- Glad Rag Doll (1929) as Barry (an actor)
- Darkened Rooms (1929) as Madame Silvara's Customer (uncredited)
- Lilies of the Field (1930) as Barber
- The Boudoir Diplomat (1930) as Potz
- Three Girls Lost (1931) as Andre
- Annabelle's Affairs (1931) as Archie
- The Age for Love (1931) as The Poet
- Surrender (1931) as Fichet
- Ladies of the Jury (1932) as Alonzo Beal
- Love Is a Racket (1932) as Manager of Elizabeth Morgan's (uncredited)
- Ex-Lady (1933) as Dinner Guest / Pianist (uncredited)
- Mama Loves Papa (1933) as Basil Pew
- Coming Out Party (1934) as Waiter at Aladdin's Lamp (uncredited)
- Jimmy the Gent (1934) as Steamship Ticket Clerk (uncredited)
- Hollywood Party (1934) as Durante's Barber (uncredited)
- Kiss and Make-Up (1934) as Jean - Dr Lamar's Butler
- Young and Beautiful (1934) as Henry Briand
- The Captain Hates the Sea (1934) as Jeweler (uncredited)
- Clive of India (1935) as Mr. St. Aubin (uncredited)
- One New York Night (1935) as Matthews (uncredited)
- Gold Diggers of 1935 (1935) as Head Waiter
- Once in a Blue Moon (1935) as Prince Kolia
- The Flame Within (1935) as Prince Hassan (uncredited)
- Don't Bet on Blondes (1935) as Wedding Dress Fitter (uncredited)
- The Payoff (1935) as Reporter (uncredited)
- Ship Cafe (1935) as Tailor (uncredited)
- The Man Who Broke the Bank at Monte Carlo (1935) as Casino Assistant (uncredited)
- Stars Over Broadway (1935) as Man Wanting Testimonial (uncredited)
- Dangerous (1935) as First Waiter (uncredited)
- Anything Goes (1936) as Man with Silly Walk (uncredited)
- The Story of Louis Pasteur (1936) as Louis Pasteur's Assistant
- The Walking Dead (1936) as Nolan's Butler (uncredited)
- Love Before Breakfast (1936) as Charles
- Colleen (1936) as Jeweler
- Snowed Under (1936) as Costume Designer Maza (uncredited)
- The Singing Kid (1936) as Designer (uncredited)
- Times Square Playboy (1936) as Jewelry Store Clerk (uncredited)
- Bullets or Ballots (1936) as Waiter (uncredited)
- Hearts Divided (1936) as Jefferson's Secretary (uncredited)
- The Big Noise (1936) as Mr. Rosewater
- Hot Money (1936) as Ed Biddle
- China Clipper (1936) as Waiter (uncredited)
- Love Begins at 20 (1936) as Eddie as Office Worker (uncredited)
- Walking on Air (1936) as Albert, the Valet
- Down the Stretch (1936) as William J. Cooper
- Cain and Mabel (1936) as Headwaiter (uncredited)
- Love on the Run (1936) as Comedy Reactionary (uncredited)
- King of Hockey (1936) as Evans, Kathleen's Chauffeur
- Stolen Holiday (1937) as Swiss Waiter (uncredited)
- Ready, Willing, and Able (1937) as Tenant (uncredited)
- Café Metropole (1937) as Hat Clerk
- San Quentin (1937) as Lorenz Review Headwaiter (uncredited)
- Dangerous Holiday (1937) as Violin Teacher (uncredited)
- Wake Up and Live (1937) as Pianist
- Fight for Your Lady (1937) as Florist (uncredited)
- Hollywood Round-Up (1937) as Hotel Clerk
- I'll Take Romance (1937) as Male Dressmaker
- The Lone Wolf in Paris (1938) as Hotel Desk Manager (uncredited)
- Beauty for the Asking (1939) as Cyril
- He Stayed for Breakfast (1940) as maître d'hôtel (uncredited)
- She Knew All the Answers (1941) as Head Waiter
- Two in a Taxi (1941) as Receptionist (uncredited)
- Our Wife (1941) as Waiter (uncredited)
- Over My Dead Body (1942) as Salesman
- Saratoga Trunk (1945) as Leon (uncredited)
- The Spider (1945) as Apartment Manager
- The Shocking Miss Pilgrim (1947) as Office Clerk (uncredited)
- Nightmare Alley (1947) as The Geek (uncredited)
- Cry of the City (1948) as Barber (uncredited)
- The Snake Pit (1948) as Patient (uncredited)
- Road House (1948) as Lefty
- Unfaithfully Yours (1948) as maître d'hôtel (uncredited)
- Chicken Every Sunday (1949) as Jake Barker (uncredited)
- The Fan (1949) as Alphonse - Philippe's Assistant (uncredited)
- You're My Everything (1949) as Waiter (uncredited)
- Dancing in the Dark (1949) as Waiter
- Wabash Avenue (1950) as Wax Museum Attendant (uncredited)
