= The Wrong Bottle =

1913 film

- Directed by: Anthony O'Sullivan
- Written by: Leon J. Suckert
- Starring: Claire McDowell
- Distributed by: General Film Company
- Release date: March 6, 1913
- Country: United States
- Language: Silent with English intertitles

The Wrong Bottle is a 1913 American drama film starring Claire McDowell and directed by Anthony O'Sullivan.

== Cast ==
- Claire McDowell as The Blind Sister
- Charles Hill Mailes as The Devoted One
- Pearl Sindelar as The Younger Sister
- Charles West as The Faithless Lover
- Hector Dion as The Faithful Lover
- Lionel Barrymore as The Father
- Clara T. Bracy as A Neighbor
- Harry Carey as Extra
- Walter Miller as In Road House
- W. C. Robinson as In Road House

== See also ==
- Harry Carey filmography
- Lionel Barrymore filmography
