= I Was Meant for You =

1913 film

- Directed by: Anthony O'Sullivan
- Written by: Harvey Gates
- Starring: Charles West
- Release date: August 11, 1913
- Country: United States
- Language: Silent with English intertitles

I Was Meant for You is a 1913 American drama film from the Biograph studio, featuring Harry Carey and written by Harvey Gates. Of the plot, a magazine writer noted that it was "a strong story well produced" featuring "a big fight that could have ended in the killing of one of the combatants, and too many scenes displaying anger and jealousy" for a pipe organ accompaniment. A reviewer in The Moving Picture World described it as "very melodramatic and not powerfully convincing."

== Cast ==
- Charles West as Theron
- Claire McDowell as Lavina
- Harry Carey as Luke
- Lionel Barrymore as Lavina's Father
- John T. Dillon as In Town

== See also ==
- Harry Carey filmography
