= The Mirror (1913 film) =

American silent film

- Directed by: Anthony O'Sullivan
- Written by: Frank E. Woods
- Produced by: Biograph Company
- Starring: Henry B. Walthall
- Distributed by: General Film Company
- Release date: July 24, 1913
- Country: United States
- Languages: Silent film English intertitles

The Mirror is a 1913 short silent film directed by Anthony O'Sullivan.

== Plot ==
Plot summary from the Library of Congress copyright for the film (1913):

This is the story of a small outlaying station where the young station agent was also obliged to act as telegraph operator. The young girl in the lonely farm-house nearby was in love with the agent and used to visit him frequently. While with him she learned the telegraph code. On one of these occasions her father was called away on business, leaving the farm-house alone. He left a note behind on the lamp-shade which read: "Daisy: I will be gone for a few hours. If Williams calls with the money give him a receipt. Father." While the girl is still having her lesson, a party of tramps, who are camping near the farm, sends one of their number to the farm-house for milk. No one answered his knock, so he entered. He found the note and hurriedly returned to the rest of the gang, telling them of the opportunity to make some easy money. They returned with him but the girl had returned before them and found the note. Just as they entered the grounds from the rear the man who was to bring the money to the farmer went around into the house. He delivered the amount and the girl gave the receipt. The girl hid the money in the bible lying on the table. The tramps, after the man's departure, made a bold entry. The girl saw them, and fleeing in through the kitchen she made her way to an upper chamber. A mirror on her bureau gave her an idea. She flashed a message by the sun to her lover at the station, using the telegraphic code he had taught her. She had locked the door and the tramps had gone to the woodshed for an axe with which to break in the door. While they were gone she flashed the following message: "Help!" "Robbers!" The reflection of the sun on the mirror came into the window where the young station agent was working. He summoned the aid of men working on the railroad and they set off to the rescue. The tramps succeeded in breaking through the door into the girl's room and dragging her down to the room below they compelled her to show them where the money was hidden. In her fright the girl opened the bible. At that moment the father returned and coming in unexpectedly was rendered unconscious by the tramps. At length the young agent and the other men came to the rescue and after a desperate struggle the tramps were captured. Some time later the girl received a note from the bashful station agent. It read: "Will you marry me?" She took her mirror and going to the window, flashed down the message which brought a smile to his face as in the telegraphic code it read the all-important word "Yes."

— Frank E. Woods (photoplay writer)

== Cast ==
- Henry B. Walthall as The Station Agent
- Claire McDowell as Daisy
- Lionel Barrymore as Daisy's Father
- Harry Carey as First Tramp
- Charles West as Second Tramp
- John T. Dillon as Third Tramp
