= The Bartered Crown =

1914 drama films

- Written by: A.L. Howie
- Starring: Lionel Barrymore; Betty Gray
- Production company: Biograph Company
- Distributed by: General Film Company
- Release date: January 10, 1914
- Country: United States

The Bartered Crown is a 1914 silent drama black-and-white film written by A.L. Howie and starring Lionel Barrymore and Betty Gray.

== Cast ==
- Lionel Barrymore as The Landlord
- Betty Gray as Mina, the Lacemaker
