= The Well (1913 film) =

1913 film

- Directed by: Anthony O'Sullivan
- Written by: Minnie Meyer
- Starring: Lionel Barrymore
- Distributed by: General Film Company
- Release date: June 12, 1913
- Country: United States
- Language: Silent with English intertitles

The Well is a 1913 American drama film featuring Harry Carey.

== Cast ==
- Lionel Barrymore as The Farmer
- Claire McDowell as The Farmer's Wife
- Harry Carey as Giuseppe, The Farmhand
- George Beranger as The Accomplice

== Plot ==
The movie was released with the logline: "Success Is often coveted instead of honestly earned. Through honest effort the farmer was enjoying the fruits of his labor, A. large irrigation well was among his new acquisitions. Therein his designing helpers held him prisoner while they left with his wealth and his daughter. There is an old saying, however, that an evil purpose always defeats its end by some committing act."
