= The Stolen Bride (1913 film) =

1913 film

- Directed by: Anthony O'Sullivan
- Written by: Kate McCabe
- Starring: Harry Carey
- Distributed by: Biograph Company
- Release date: April 7, 1913
- Country: United States
- Language: Silent with English intertitles

The Stolen Bride is a 1913 American drama film starring Harry Carey and Blanche Sweet.

== Cast ==
- Harry Carey as The Husband
- Claire McDowell as The Wife
- Charles West as The Overseer (credited as Charles H. West)
- Blanche Sweet as The Grower's Daughter
- Harry Hyde as In Posse
- Hector Sarno as In Posse
