= The Stolen Treaty (1913 film) =

1913 film

- Directed by: Anthony O'Sullivan
- Written by: Julia M. Purdy
- Starring: Lionel Barrymore
- Distributed by: General Film Company
- Release date: September 18, 1913
- Country: United States
- Language: Silent with English intertitles

The Stolen Treaty is a 1913 American drama film featuring Harry Carey and Lionel Barrymore.

== Cast ==
- Lionel Barrymore as The Japanese Diplomat
- Claire McDowell as Olga
- Reggie Morris as Olga's Friend
- Harry Carey as The Detective
- William J. Butler as A Diplomat
