= List of Western films before 1920 =

Film list

A list of the earliest Western films, by decade, released before 1920.

== 1890s ==
=== 1894 ===
- Annie Oakley
- Bucking Broncho
- Buffalo Bill
- Buffalo Dance
- Lasso Thrower
- Mexican Knife Duel
- Sioux Ghost Dance

These exhibition films are silent shorts directed and produced by William K. L. Dickson at Thomas Edison's Black Maria studio, with William Heise as cinematographer. The performers in each film were members of Buffalo Bill's Wild West show with Annie Oakley and Buffalo Bill themselves exhibiting their rifle shooting skills. The two dances featured members of the Sioux nation who are believed to have been the first Native Americans to perform on film. The lasso thrower was Vicente Oropeza and the stuntmen staging the knife fight were Pedro Esquivel and Dionecio Gonzales. Two real-life rodeo riders, Lee Martin and Frank Hammitt, featured in Bucking Broncho, which was filmed outside the studio.

=== 1895 ===
- A Frontier Scene (aka Lynching Scene)
- Indian Scalping Scene

Both of these films, which were scenes only, are believed lost. They were made by Alfred Clark for the Edison Manufacturing Company.

=== 1899 ===
- Kidnapping by Indians

This is a two-minute silent film drama shot in Blackburn, Lancashire, England by Mitchell and Kenyon. It is the earliest known dramatic work in the genre.

- Cripple Creek Bar-room Scene
- Poker at Dawson City

These two films were produced by Edison's Black Maria and have been argued to be the first Western films.

- A Bluff from a Tenderfoot

Filmed by Frederick S. Armitage for the American Mutoscope and Biograph Company, this depicts a poker game.

== 1900s ==
=== 1901 ===
- Stage Coach Hold-Up in the Days of '49 (Edison)

=== 1903 ===
- Alphonse and Gaston, No. 3 (American Mutoscope & Biograph)
- The Cowboy and the Lady (American Mutoscope & Biograph)
- The Great Train Robbery (Edison)
- Kit Carson (American Mutoscope & Biograph)
- The Pioneers (American Mutoscope & Biograph)
- Prairie Emigrant Train Crossing the Plains (Lubin Manufacturing Company)
- Stage Hold-Up (Selig Polyscope Company)
- Western Card Game (Lubin)

=== 1904 ===
- A Brush Between Cowboys and Indians (Edison)
- Bushranging in North Queensland (Limelight Department)
- Cowboy Justice (American Mutoscope & Biograph)
- The Great Train Robbery (Lubin)
- The Hold-Up of the Leadville Stage (Selig)
- Western Stage Coach Hold Up (Edison)

=== 1905 ===
- Life on the Circle Ranch (Circle Ranch Film Company)
- The Little Train Robbery (Edison)
- The Train Wreckers (Edison)

=== 1906 ===
- L'arrivo di Buffalo Bill a Roma
- Attack on Fort Boonesboro
- From Leadville to Aspen: A Hold-Up in the Rockies
- Holdup of the Rocky Mountain Express
- Ned Kelly and His Gang
- The Life of a Cowboy
- The Prospectors, a Romance of the Gold Fields
- The Secret of Death Valley
- The Squatter's Daughter
- The Story of the Kelly Gang

=== 1907 ===
- The Bandit King
- Robbery Under Arms (by Charles MacMahon)
- Robbery Under Arms (by J Tait and N Tait)

=== 1908 ===
- The Bank Robbery
- The Fight for Freedom
- The Girl and the Outlaw
- The Kentuckian (1908 film)
- The Red Girl
- The Red Man and the Child

=== 1909 ===
- Bill Sharkey's Last Game
- Comata, the Sioux
- The Cowboy Millionaire
- The House of Cards
- The Mended Lute
- The Red Man's View

== 1910s ==
=== 1910 ===
- Abernathy Kids to the Rescue
- Across the Plains
- Broncho Billy's Redemption
- In Old California
- The Two Brothers

=== 1911 ===
- The Abernathy Kids to the Rescue
- An Accidental Outlaw
- Across the Plains
- The Battle
- The Cowboy and the Lady
- The Indian Brothers
- Fighting Blood
- The Last Drop of Water
- The Last of the Mohicans (colonial Western)
- The Lonedale Operator
- Swords and Hearts
- The Telltale Knife
- Was He a Coward?

=== 1912 ===
- According to Law
- The Ace of Spades
- Algie the Miner
- The Belle of Bar-Z Ranch
- The Chief's Blanket
- Geronimo's Last Raid
- The Girl and Her Trust (remake of 'The Lonedale Operator')
- The Goddess of Sagebrush Gulch
- The Half-Breed's Way
- The Heart of an Indian
- His Only Son
- The Invaders
- The Massacre
- My Hero
- A Temporary Truce
- Under Burning Skies
- When the Heart Calls
- With the Enemy's Help

=== 1913 ===
- The Abandoned Well
- The Accidental Bandit
- The Accusation of Broncho Billy
- The Battle at Elderbush Gulch
- Broken Ways
- Calamity Anne's Beauty
- Calamity Anne's Inheritance
- During the Round-Up
- Hearts and Horses
- In the Secret Service
- An Indian's Loyalty
- Past Redemption
- The Ranchero's Revenge
- The Sheriff's Baby
- The Tenderfoot's Money
- Three Friends
- Two Men of the Desert

=== 1914 ===
- The Bargain
- The Girl Stage Driver
- Her Grave Mistake (considered lost)
- The Man from the East
- A Miner's Romance (considered lost)
- A Ranch Romance (considered lost)
- Rose of the Rancho
- The Spoilers
- The Squaw Man
- A Ticket to Red Horse Gulch
- The Tragedy of Whispering Creek (considered lost)
- The Virginian

=== 1915 ===
- Broncho Billy and the Baby
- Buckshot John
- The Desert Breed (considered lost)
- The Girl of the Golden West
- The Heart of a Bandit
- Keno Bates, Liar
- The Passing of the Oklahoma Outlaws
- The Ring of Destiny
- The Slave Girl
- The Stagecoach Driver and the Girl

=== 1916 ===
- According to St. John
- Accusing Evidence
- The Apostle of Vengeance
- The Committee on Credentials
- For the Love of a Girl
- Hell's Hinges
- A Knight of the Range
- Lass of the Lumberlands
- Liberty (presumed to be lost)
- Love's Lariat
- The Night Riders
- The Passing of Hell's Crown
- The Return of Draw Egan
- Stampede in the Night
- The Three Godfathers
- The Wire Pullers
- A Woman's Eyes

=== 1917 ===
- A 44-Calibre Mystery
- The Almost Good Man
- The Bad Man of Cheyenne
- Blood Money
- The Drifter
- The Dynamite Special
- The Empty Gun
- The Fighting Gringo
- The Fighting Trail
- Goin' Straight
- The Golden Bullet
- Hair-Trigger Burke
- Hands Up!
- The Honor of an Outlaw
- The Little Moccasins
- A Marked Man (considered lost)
- The Mysterious Outlaw
- The Narrow Trail
- The Outlaw and the Lady
- A Romance of the Redwoods
- Roped In
- The Scrapper (considered lost)
- The Silent Man
- Single Shot Parker aka 'The Heart of Texas Ryan'
- Six-Shooter Justice
- The Soul Herder (considered lost)
- Squaring It
- Straight Shooting
- The Texas Sphinx
- The Tornado (considered lost)
- Wild and Woolly
- The Wrong Man

=== 1918 ===
- The Branded Man
- Bucking Broadway
- The Grand Passion
- Hell Bent
- Out West
- Play Straight or Fight
- Revenge
- Riddle Gawne (partially lost)
- Riders of the Purple Sage
- Ruggles of Red Gap (considered lost)
- The Scarlet Drop (partially lost)
- The Squaw Man (partially lost)
- Three Mounted Men (considered lost)
- A Woman's Fool (considered lost)

=== 1919 ===
- Ace High
- Ace of the Saddle (considered lost)
- The Black Horse Bandit
- Bare Fists (considered lost)
- By Indian Post
- The Crooked Coin
- The Crow
- The Double Hold-Up
- Elmo the Mighty (considered lost)
- The Face in the Watch
- A Fight for Love (considered lost)
- The Fighting Brothers
- The Fighting Heart
- The Fighting Line
- The Four-Bit Man
- A Gun Fightin' Gentleman
- Gun Law
- The Gun Runners
- His Buddy
- The Jack of Hearts
- The Kid and the Cowboy
- Kingdom Come
- The Knickerbocker Buckaroo (considered lost)
- The Last Outlaw
- Lightning Bryce (horror Western)
- The Lone Hand
- Marked Men (considered lost)
- The Masked Rider (partially lost)
- The Outcasts of Poker Flat (considered lost)
- Partners Three
- Rider of the Law (considered lost)
- Roped (considered lost)
- Rustlers
- The Rustlers
- Scarlet Days
- The Tell Tale Wire
- Terror of the Range (considered lost)
- The Trail of the Holdup Man
- The Tune of Bullets
- A Western Wooing
- The Wilderness Trail

== See also ==
- Lists of Western films
