= Harry Carey filmography =

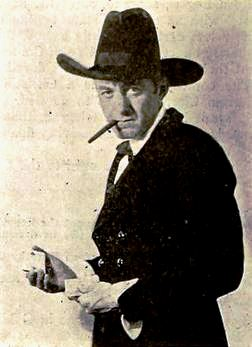
Harry Carey in The Outcasts of Poker Flat

This is a list of films featuring Harry Carey.

== List ==
| Year | Title | Role | Director | Notes |
|---|---|---|---|---|
| 1909 | Bill Sharkey's Last Game | | D. W. Griffith | Lost film |
| 1910 | Gentleman Joe | | | Lost film |
| September 9, 1912 | An Unseen Enemy | The Thief | D. W. Griffith | |
| September 19, 1912 | Two Daughters of Eve | In Audience | D. W. Griffith | |
| September 23, 1912 | Friends | Bob Kyne - the Prospector | D. W. Griffith | |
| September 30, 1912 | So Near, yet So Far | A Thief | D. W. Griffith | |
| October 3, 1912 | A Feud in the Kentucky Hills | Second Clan Member | D. W. Griffith | |
| October 14, 1912 | In the Aisles of the Wild | Bob Cole | D. W. Griffith | Lost film |
| October 21, 1912 | The One She Loved | The Neighbor's Friend | D. W. Griffith | |
| October 24, 1912 | The Painted Lady | At Ice Cream Festival | D. W. Griffith | Uncredited |
| October 31, 1912 | The Musketeers of Pig Alley | Snapper's Sidekick | D. W. Griffith | |
| November 4, 1912 | Heredity | White Renegade Father | D. W. Griffith | Lost film |
| November 12, 1912 | Gold and Glitter | Lumberman | D. W. Griffith; Frank Powell | Uncredited |
| November 21, 1912 | The Informer | The Union Corporal | D. W. Griffith | |
| December 2, 1912 | Brutality | At Theatre | D. W. Griffith | |
| December 12, 1912 | My Hero | Indian | D. W. Griffith | Lost film |
| December 16, 1912 | The Burglar's Dilemma | Older Crook | D. W. Griffith | |
| December 23, 1912 | A Cry for Help | The Thief | D. W. Griffith | Lost film |
| December 26, 1912 | The God Within | | D. W. Griffith | |
| January 2, 1913 | Three Friends | In Saloon / In First Factory | D. W. Griffith | Lost film Uncredited |
| January 6, 1913 | The Telephone Girl and the Lady | The Thief | D. W. Griffith | |
| January 13, 1913 | Pirate Gold | | D. W. Griffith | Lost film |
| January 16, 1913 | An Adventure in the Autumn Woods | Third Thief | D. W. Griffith | Lost film |
| January 27, 1913 | A Misappropriated Turkey | The Bartender | D. W. Griffith | Lost film |
| February 3, 1913 | Brothers | The Mother's Favorite Son | D. W. Griffith | Lost film |
| February 6, 1913 | Oil and Water | Stage Manager / At Dinner | D. W. Griffith | |
| February 24, 1913 | A Chance Deception | Raffles | D. W. Griffith | Lost film |
| February 27, 1913 | Love in an Apartment Hotel | The Thief | | Lost film |
| March 6, 1913 | The Wrong Bottle | Undetermined Minor Role | Anthony O'Sullivan | Lost film Uncredited |
| March 8, 1913 | Broken Ways | The Sheriff | D. W. Griffith | |
| March 10, 1913 | A Girl's Stratagem | Girl's Sweetheart | D. W. Griffith | Lost film |
| March 15, 1913 | The Unwelcome Guest | The Sheriff | D. W. Griffith | |
| March 20, 1913 | Near to Earth | | D. W. Griffith | Lost film |
| March 29, 1913 | The Sheriff's Baby | Second Bandit | D. W. Griffith | Lost film |
| April 3, 1913 | The Hero of Little Italy | Tony | D. W. Griffith | Lost film |
| April 7, 1913 | The Stolen Bride | The Husband | Anthony O'Sullivan | Lost film |
| April 17, 1913 | A Frightful Blunder | The Superintendent | Anthony O'Sullivan | Lost film |
| April 21, 1913 | The Left-Handed Man | The Left-Handed Thief | D. W. Griffith | |
| May 1, 1913 | If We Only Knew | The Sailor | D. W. Griffith | Lost film |
| May 3, 1913 | The Wanderer | A Soldier | D. W. Griffith | Uncredited |
| May 5, 1913 | The Tenderfoot's Money | The Gambler | Anthony O'Sullivan | Lost film |
| May 10, 1913 | The Stolen Loaf | The Butler | D. W. Griffith | Lost film |
| May 19, 1913 | Olaf—An Atom | Olaf | Anthony O'Sullivan | Lost film |
| May 29, 1913 | A Dangerous Foe | The 'Bull' | Anthony O'Sullivan | Lost film |
| June 2, 1913 | The Ranchero's Revenge | The Schemer | D. W. Griffith | Lost film |
| June 9, 1913 | Red Hicks Defies the World | In Crowd | Dell Henderson | Lost film Uncredited |
| June 12, 1913 | The Well | Giuseppe, the Farmhand | Anthony O'Sullivan | Lost film |
| June 16, 1913 | The Switch Tower | | Anthony O'Sullivan | |
| June 26, 1913 | In Diplomatic Circles | The Butler | Anthony O'Sullivan | Lost film |
| June 30, 1913 | A Gamble with Death | The Cowpuncher | Anthony O'Sullivan | Lost film |
| July 5, 1913 | The Sorrowful Shore | The Widowed Father | D. W. Griffith | |
| July 10, 1913 | The Enemy's Baby | Miller | D. W. Griffith | Lost film |
| July 12, 1913 | The Mistake | Undetermined Role | D. W. Griffith | Lost film |
| July 14, 1913 | A Gambler's Honor | The Gambler | Anthony O'Sullivan | Lost film |
| July 24, 1913 | The Mirror | First Tramp | Anthony O'Sullivan | Lost film |
| July 28, 1913 | The Vengeance of Galora | A Prospector | Anthony O'Sullivan | Lost film |
| August 2, 1913 | When Love Forgives | Second Criminal | Anthony O'Sullivan | Lost film |
| August 7, 1913 | Under the Shadow of the Law | The Convict | Anthony O'Sullivan | Lost film |
| August 11, 1913 | I Was Meant for You | Luke | Anthony O'Sullivan | Lost film |
| August 23, 1913 | Two Men of the Desert | | D. W. Griffith | Lost film |
| August 25, 1913 | The Crook and the Girl | The Crook | Anthony O'Sullivan | Lost film |
| August 28, 1913 | Black and White | | Dell Henderson | Lost film |
| September 6, 1913 | The Strong Man's Burden | Bob - the Younger Brother | Anthony O'Sullivan | Lost film |
| September 8, 1913 | A Modest Hero | | Dell Henderson | Lost film |
| September 18, 1913 | The Stolen Treaty | The Detective | Anthony O'Sullivan | Lost film |
| September 22, 1913 | The Law and His Son | Manning | Anthony O'Sullivan | Lost film |
| October 2, 1913 | A Tender-Hearted Crook | The Thief | Anthony O'Sullivan | Lost film |
| October 20, 1913 | The Van Nostrand Tiara | Society Detective | Anthony O'Sullivan | Lost film |
| October 25, 1913 | Madonna of the Storm | Undetermined Role | D. W. Griffith | Lost film |
| November 1, 1913 | The Stopped Clock | The Detective | Anthony O'Sullivan | Lost film |
| November 20, 1913 | The Detective's Stratagem | Keene, the Detective | John J.A. Gibney | Lost film |
| November 24, 1913 | All for Science | The Young Man | Anthony O'Sullivan | Lost film |
| November 1913 | The Battle at Elderbush Gulch | | D. W. Griffith | |
| December 27, 1913 | The Abandoned Well | The Adopted Son | Oliver L. Sellers; Travers Vale | Lost film |
| February 14, 1914 | A Nest Unfeathered | The Foreman | | Lost film |
| February 23, 1914 | Her Father's Silent Partner | | Donald Crisp | Lost film |
| March 8, 1914 | Judith of Bethulia | Assyrian Traitor | D. W. Griffith | |
| April 25, 1914 | Brute Force | In Womanless Tribe | D. W. Griffith | |
| June 10, 1914 | The Master Cracksman | Gentleman Joe, the Cracksman | Harry Carey | Lost film |
| November 2, 1914 | McVeagh of the South Seas | Cyril Bruce McVeagh | Harry Carey; Cyril Bruce; Gregory Allen (assistant director) | |
| February 22, 1915 | The Heart of a Bandit | Texas Pete - the Bandit | | Earliest surviving Western starring Carey |
| March 18, 1915 | His Desperate Deed | Burleigh | | Lost film |
| March 18, 1915 | The Battle of Frenchman's Run | | Theodore Marston | Lost film |
| March 25, 1915 | The Love Transcendent | The Prospector | | Lost film |
| March 27, 1915 | Perils of the Jungle | | E. A. Martin | Lost film |
| April 2, 1915 | The Sheriff's Dilemma | The Sheriff | | Lost film |
| April 9, 1915 | The Miser's Legacy | Jackson - The Crook | | Lost film |
| April 12, 1915 | The Gambler's I.O.U. | Dave Dawson | | Lost film |
| May 1, 1915 | A Double Winning | 2nd Sportsman | | Lost film |
| May 8, 1915 | A Day's Adventure | Hogan - Leader of the Crooks | | Lost film |
| May 17, 1915 | The Canceled Mortgage | 1st Road Agent | | Lost film |
| May 29, 1915 | Truth Stranger Than Fiction | Crook | | Lost film |
| June 4, 1915 | Her Dormant Love | Dandy Dick - The Fugitive | | |
| June 19, 1915 | The Way Out | The Bandit | Anthony O'Sullivan | Lost film |
| June 24, 1915 | Her Convert | The Converted Cracksman | Anthony O'Sullivan | Lost film |
| July 10, 1915 | Old Offenders | Norris | Anthony O'Sullivan | Lost film |
| July 12, 1915 | As It Happened | The New Foreman | Anthony O'Sullivan | Lost film |
| August 16, 1915 | Just Jim | Jim | O.A.C. Lund | Lost film |
| September 27, 1915 | Judge Not; or The Woman of Mona Diggings | Miles Rand | Robert Z. Leonard | Lost film |
| December 11, 1915 | Graft | Tom Larnigan | George Lessey; Richard Stanton | Lost film Episodes 4-12 |
| January 31, 1916 | Secret Love | Fergus Derrick | Robert Z. Leonard | |
| February 7, 1916 | A Knight of the Range | Cheyenne Harry | Jacques Jaccard | Lost film |
| April 1, 1916 | The Night Riders | | Jacques Jaccard | Lost film |
| April 22, 1916 | The Passing of Hell's Crown | Blaze | Jacques Jaccard | Lost film |
| May 27, 1916 | The Wedding Guest | The Squarest Sheriff Alive | Jacques Jaccard | Lost film |
| June 19, 1916 | The Three Godfathers | Bob Sangster | Edward LeSaint | Lost film |
| June 27, 1916 | The Jackals of a Great City | Tom Wayne | Edward LeSaint | Lost film |
| July 8, 1916 | The Committee on Credentials | Ballaret Bill | George Marshall | Lost film |
| July 29, 1916 | For the Love of a Girl | Black La Rue | Harry Carey | Lost film |
| August 7, 1916 | Love's Lariat | Sky High | Harry Carey; George Marshall | Lost film |
| August 17, 1916 | A Woman's Eyes | Tom Horn | George Marshall | Lost film |
| August 24, 1916 | The Devil's Own | Shifty | George Marshall | Lost film |
| September 18, 1916 | Behind the Lines | Dr. Ralph Hamlin | Henry MacRae | Lost film |
| October 21, 1916 | The Conspiracy | Dick Olney | Henry MacRae | Lost film |
| November 17, 1916 | Guilty | Ramon Valentine | Henry MacRae | Lost film |
| January 6, 1917 | Blood Money | Cheyenne Harry | Fred Kelsey | Lost film |
| January 13, 1917 | The Bad Man of Cheyenne | Cheyenne Harry | Fred Kelsey | Lost film |
| February 10, 1917 | The Outlaw and the Lady | Cheyenne Harry | Fred Kelsey | Lost film |
| March 10, 1917 | The Drifter | Cheyenne Harry | Fred Kelsey | Lost film |
| March 24, 1917 | Goin' Straight | Cheyenne Harry | Fred Kelsey | Lost film |
| March 26, 1917 | The Fighting Gringo | William 'Red' Saunders | Fred Kelsey | Lost film |
| April 10, 1917 | Hair-Trigger Burke | Hair Trigger Burke | Fred Kelsey; Eugene B. Lewis | Lost film |
| May 15, 1917 | The Honor of an Outlaw | Cheyenne Harry | Fred Kelsey | Lost film |
| May 22, 1917 | A 44-Calibre Mystery | Sheriff Cheyenne Harry | Fred Kelsey | Lost film |
| June 5, 1917 | The Almost Good Man | Dick Glenning | Fred Kelsey | Lost film |
| June 11, 1917 | The Mysterious Outlaw | Buck Lessen | Fred Kelsey | Lost film |
| June 26, 1917 | The Golden Bullet | Jack | Fred Kelsey | Lost film |
| July 7, 1917 | The Wrong Man | Cheyenne Harry | Fred Kelsey | Lost film |
| July 17, 1917 | Six-Shooter Justice | Cheyenne Harry | Fred Kelsey | Lost film |
| August 3, 1917 | The Soul Herder | Cheyenne Harry | John Ford | Lost film |
| August 4, 1917 | Cheyenne's Pal | Cheyenne Harry | John Ford | Lost film |
| August 27, 1917 | Straight Shooting | Cheyenne Harry | John Ford | |
| September 15, 1917 | The Texas Sphinx | Jim Cranman | Fred Kelsey | Lost film |
| October 1, 1917 | The Secret Man | Cheyenne Harry | John Ford | Incomplete film |
| October 19, 1917 | A Marked Man | Cheyenne Harry | John Ford | Lost film |
| December 24, 1917 | Bucking Broadway | Cheyenne Harry | John Ford | |
| January 28, 1918 | The Phantom Riders | Cheyenne Harry | John Ford | Lost film |
| February 24, 1918 | Wild Women | Cheyenne Harry | John Ford | Lost film |
| March 18, 1918 | Thieves' Gold | Cheyenne Harry | John Ford | Lost film |
| April 22, 1918 | The Scarlet Drop | 'Kaintuck' Harry Ridge | John Ford | |
| July 6, 1918 | Hell Bent | Cheyenne Harry | John Ford | |
| August 15, 1918 | A Woman's Fool | Lin McLean | John Ford | Lost film |
| October 7, 1918 | Three Mounted Men | Cheyenne Harry | John Ford | Lost film |
| January 13, 1919 | Roped | Cheyenne Harry | John Ford | Lost film |
| March 24, 1919 | A Fight for Love | Cheyenne Harry | John Ford | Lost film |
| May 5, 1919 | Bare Fists | Cheyenne Harry | John Ford | Lost film |
| June 9, 1919 | Riders of Vengeance | Cheyenne Harry | John Ford | Lost film |
| June 29, 1919 | The Outcasts of Poker Flat | Square Shootin' Harry Lanyon / John Oakhurst | John Ford | Lost film |
| August 18, 1919 | Ace of the Saddle | Cheyenne Harry | John Ford | Lost film |
| November 3, 1919 | Rider of the Law | Jim Kyneton | John Ford | Lost film |
| November 29, 1919 | A Gun Fightin' Gentleman | Cheyenne Harry | John Ford | Incomplete film |
| December 21, 1919 | Marked Men | Cheyenne Harry | John Ford | Lost film |
| March 22, 1920 | Overland Red | Overland Red | Lynn Reynolds | Lost film |
| May 3, 1920 | Bullet Proof | Pierre Winton | Lynn Reynolds | Lost film |
| June 28, 1920 | Human Stuff | James 'Jim' Pierce | B. Reeves Eason | Lost film |
| August 23, 1920 | Blue Streak McCoy | Job McCoy | B. Reeves Eason | Lost film |
| October 1920 | Sundown Slim | Sundown Slim | Val Paul | Lost film |
| November 22, 1920 | West Is West | Dick Rainboldt | Val Paul | Lost film |
| 1921 | 'If Only' Jim | Jim Golden | Jacques Jaccard | Lost film |
| January 2, 1921 | Hearts Up | David Brent | Val Paul | Lost film |
| April 9, 1921 | The Freeze-Out | Ohio, the Stranger | John Ford | Lost film |
| May 9, 1921 | The Wallop | John Wesley Pringle | John Ford | Lost film |
| July 9, 1921 | Desperate Trails | Bart Carson | John Ford | Lost film |
| July 24, 1921 | The Fox | Ol' Santa Fe | Robert Thornby | Lost film |
| March 20, 1922 | Man to Man | Steve Packard | Stuart Paton | Lost film |
| July 1922 | The Kickback | White Horse Harry | Val Paul | Lost film |
| November 5, 1922 | Good Men and True | J. Wesley Pringle | Val Paul | Lost film |
| January 21, 1923 | Canyon of the Fools | Bob | Val Paul | |
| April 1, 1923 | Crashin' Thru | Blake | Val Paul | Lost film |
| July 8, 1923 | Desert Driven | Bob | Val Paul | Lost film |
| August 19, 1923 | The Miracle Baby | Neil Allison | Val Paul | Lost film |
| February 17, 1924 | The Night Hawk | 'The Hawk' | Stuart Paton | Lost film |
| May 18, 1924 | The Lightning Rider | Phlip Morgan | Lloyd Ingraham | |
| July 13, 1924 | Tiger Thompson | Tiger Thompson | B. Reeves Eason | Lost film |
| September 21, 1924 | Roaring Rails | Big Bill Benson | Tom Forman | |
| December 21, 1924 | The Flaming Forties | Bill Jones | Tom Forman | Lost film |
| 1924 | The Man from Texas | | | |
| January 1, 1925 | Soft Shoes | Pat Halahan | Lloyd Ingraham | |
| March 2, 1925 | Beyond the Border | Bob Smith | Scott R. Dunlap | |
| April 13, 1925 | Silent Sanderson | Joel Parsons / Silent Sanderson | Scott R. Dunlap | Lost film |
| June 1, 1925 | The Texas Trail | Pete Grainger | Scott R. Dunlap | Lost film |
| July 15, 1925 | The Bad Lands | Patrick Angus O'Toole | Dell Henderson | Lost film |
| October 11, 1925 | The Prairie Pirate | Brian Delaney aka The Yellow Seal | Edmund Mortimer | |
| December 13, 1925 | The Man from Red Gulch | Alexander 'Sandy' Morton | Edmund Mortimer | |
| February 21, 1926 | Driftin' Thru | Daniel Brown | Scott R. Dunlap | Lost film |
| April 18, 1926 | The Seventh Bandit | David Scanlon | Scott R. Dunlap | Lost film |
| June 20, 1926 | The Frontier Trail | Jim Cardigan | Scott R. Dunlap | Lost film |
| August 15, 1926 | Satan Town | Bill Scott | Edmund Mortimer | Incomplete film |
| January 1, 1927 | A Little Journey | Alexander Smith | Robert Z. Leonard | Lost film |
| January 15, 1927 | Johnny Get Your Hair Cut | | B. Reeves Eason; Archie Mayo | Lost film |
| March 12, 1927 | Slide, Kelly, Slide | Tom Munson | Edward Sedgwick | |
| March 20, 1928 | The Trail of '98 | Jack Locasto | Clarence Brown | |
| September 30, 1928 | Burning Bridges | Jim Whitely / Bob Whitely | James P. Hogan | Lost film |
| December 23, 1928 | The Border Patrol | Bill Storm | James P. Hogan | |
| May 23, 1931 | Trader Horn | Aloysius 'Trader' Horn | W. S. Van Dyke | |
| June 2, 1931 | The Vanishing Legion | 'Happy' Cardigan | Ford Beebe; B. Reeves Eason | |
| October 2, 1931 | Bad Company | McBaine | Tay Garnett | |
| November 15, 1931 | Cavalier of the West | Capt. John Allister | John P. McCarthy | |
| January 2, 1932 | Without Honor | Pete Marlan | William Nigh | |
| February 28, 1932 | Law and Order | Ed Brandt | Edward L. Cahn | |
| April 4, 1932 | Border Devils | Jim Gray | William Nigh | |
| May 17, 1932 | The Last of the Mohicans | Hawkeye Ford | Beebe; B. Reeves Eason | |
| August 22, 1932 | The Night Rider | John Brown posing as Jim Blake | Fred C. Newmeyer; William Nigh | |
| November 1, 1932 | The Devil Horse | Bob Norton / Roberts | Otto Brower | |
| March 1, 1933 | The Thundering Herd | Clark Sprague | Henry Hathaway | |
| May 26, 1933 | Sunset Pass | John Hesbitt | Henry Hathaway | |
| August 25, 1933 | Man of the Forest | Jim Gayner | Henry Hathaway | |
| April 9, 1935 | Wagon Trail | Sheriff Clay Hartley | Harry L. Fraser | |
| May 1, 1935 | Rustler's Paradise | Cheyenne Kincaid | Harry L. Fraser | |
| August 27, 1935 | Powdersmoke Range | Tucson Smith | Wallace Fox | |
| October 13, 1935 | Barbary Coast | Jed Slocum | Howard Hawks | |
| October 22, 1935 | Wild Mustang | Joe 'Wild Mustang' Norton | Harry L. Fraser | |
| November 12, 1935 | The Last of the Clintons | Trigger Carson | Harry L. Fraser | |
| February 28, 1936 | The Prisoner of Shark Island | Commandant of Fort Jefferson | John Ford | |
| February 15, 1936 | Ghost Town | Cheyenne Harry Morgan | Harry L. Fraser | |
| March 1, 1936 | Sutter's Gold | Kit Carson | James Cruze | |
| June 5, 1936 | Little Miss Nobody | John Russell | John G. Blystone | |
| June 12, 1936 | The Last Outlaw | Dean Payton | Christy Cabanne | |
| January 2, 1936 | Aces Wild | Cheyenne Harry Morgan | Harry L. Fraser | |
| October 2, 1936 | Valiant Is the Word for Carrie | Phil Yonne | Wesley Ruggles | |
| October 23, 1936 | The Accusing Finger | Sen. Nash | James P. Hogan | |
| January 12, 1937 | Racing Lady | Tom Martin | Wallace Fox | |
| May 26, 1937 | Kid Galahad | Silver Jackson | Michael Curtiz | |
| 1937 | Lest We Forget | Himself | | |
| June 4, 1937 | Border Cafe | Tex Stevens | Lew Landers | |
| June 25, 1937 | Born Reckless | Dad Martin | Malcolm St. Clair; Gustav Machaty | |
| August 9, 1937 | Souls at Sea | Captain of 'William Brown' | Henry Hathaway | |
| September 10, 1937 | Annapolis Salute | Chief Martin | Christy Cabanne | |
| December 3, 1937 | Danger Patrol | Sam Street | Lew Landers | |
| February 23, 1938 | The Port of Missing Girls | Captain Josiah Storm | Karl Brown | |
| May 29, 1938 | You and Me | Jerome Morris | Fritz Lang | |
| July 22, 1938 | Sky Giant | Col. Cornelius Stockton | Lew Landers | |
| August 5, 1938 | Gateway | Commissioner Nelson | Lamar Trotti | |
| September 30, 1938 | King of Alcatraz | Captain Glennan | Robert Florey | |
| November 18, 1938 | The Law West of Tombstone | Bill Barker | Glenn Tyron | |
| January 13, 1939 | Burn 'Em Up O'Connor | P. G. 'Pinky' Delano | Edward Sedgwick | |
| April 14, 1939 | Code of the Streets | Detective Lieutenant John Lewis | Harold Young | |
| April 25, 1939 | Street of Missing Men | Charles Putnam | Sidney Salkow | |
| June 2, 1939 | Inside Information | Captain Bill Dugan | Charles Lamont | |
| October 17, 1939 | Mr. Smith Goes to Washington | President of the Senate | Frank Capra | |
| December 28, 1939 | My Son Is Guilty | Police Officer Tim Kerry | Charles Barton | |
| March 7, 1940 | Outside the Three-Mile Limit | Captain Bailey | Lewis D. Collins | |
| May 10, 1940 | Beyond Tomorrow | George Melton | A. Edward Sutherland | |
| October 25, 1940 | They Knew What They Wanted | The doctor | Garson Kanin | |
| July 18, 1941 | The Shepherd of the Hills | Daniel Howitt | Henry Hathaway | |
| September 12, 1941 | Parachute Battalion | Bill Richards | Leslie Goodwins | |
| October 16, 1941 | Sundown | Dewey | Henry Hathaway | |
| December 19, 1941 | Among the Living | Dr. Ben Saunders | Stuart Heisler | |
| June 11, 1942 | The Spoilers | Al Dextry | Ray Enright | |
| February 3, 1943 | Air Force | Crew Chief Sgt. White | Howard Hawks | |
| December 3, 1943 | Happy Land | Gramp | Irving Pichel | |
| August 23, 1944 | The Great Moment | Professor John C. Warren | Preston Sturges | |
| May 27, 1945 | China's Little Devils | Doc Temple | Monta Bell | |
| December 31, 1946 | Duel in the Sun | Lem Smoot | King Vidor | |
| February 15, 1947 | Angel and the Badman | McClintock | James Edward Grant | |
| April 25, 1947 | The Sea of Grass | Doc J. Reid | Elia Kazan | |
| August 26, 1948 | Red River | Mr. Melville | Howard Hawks | Released posthumously |
| November 29, 1948 | So Dear to My Heart | head judge at County Fair | Harold D. Schuster; Hamilton Luske | Released posthumously (final film role) |
