= Going Straight (disambiguation) =

Going Straight is a 1978 British comedy television series starring Ronnie Barker that is a spin-off of the British series Porridge.

Going Straight may also refer to:

- Going Straight (1916 film), a 1916 American silent film starring Norma Talmadge
- Going Straight (1933 film), a 1933 British comedy film directed by John Rawlins
- Going Straight (TV programme), a 2003 New Zealand reality television competition programme hosted by Manu Bennett
- Goin' Straight, a 1917 American silent film starring Harry Carey
