= The Fighting Gringo =

The Fighting Gringo may refer to:

- The Fighting Gringo (1917 film)
- The Fighting Gringo (1939 film)
