= Perils of the Jungle =

Perils of the Jungle may refer to:

- Perils of the Jungle (1915 film), an American film directed by E.A. Martin
- Perils of the Jungle (1927 film), an American film directed by Jack Nelson
- Perils of the Jungle (1941 film), an American short film directed by Attilio Gatti
- Perils of the Jungle (1953 film), an American film directed by George Blair
