= Vester Pegg =

American actor (1899–1951)

- Born: May 23, 1889; Appleton City, Missouri, U.S.
- Died: February 19, 1951 (aged 61); Los Angeles, California, U.S.
- Occupation: Actor
- Years active: 1912–1941

Vester Pegg (May 23, 1889 – February 19, 1951) was an American actor of the silent film era. He appeared in 140 films between 1912 and 1941, mainly Westerns. He was born in Appleton City, Missouri and died in Los Angeles, California.

Pegg became a picador in 1909, working in a bull ring in Mexico City. He left that job after a bull charged and killed the horse on which Pegg was riding. He moved to California, where he began acting in stock theater. After 18 months of acting on stage, he began acting in films, eventually signing with Universal Pictures, where he worked with Harry Carey's company.

== Selected filmography ==
- The Birth of a Nation (1915) – Minor Role (uncredited)
- The Lucky Transfer (1915, Short) – The clerk
- Jordan Is a Hard Road (1915) – (uncredited)
- Blue Blood and Red (1916)
- Intolerance (1916) – Extra (uncredited)
- Blood Money (1917, Short) – Bud Cameron
- The Bad Man of Cheyenne (1917, Short) – Vesta
- The Outlaw and the Lady (1917, Short)
- Goin' Straight (1917, Short) – Pinnacle Bill
- The Fighting Gringo (1917) – Pedro
- Hair-Trigger Burke (1917, Short) – Bill
- A 44-Calibre Mystery (1917, Short) – Pete McGuire
- The Almost Good Man (1917, Short) – Pete Willis
- The Golden Bullet (1917, Short) – Dick Henderson, alias Rogue River Charlie
- The Wrong Man (1917, Short) – Chip Stevens
- The Soul Herder (1917, Short) – Topeka Jack
- Cheyenne's Pal (1917, Short) – Cowboy
- Straight Shooting (1917) – Placer Fremont
- The Texas Sphinx (1917, Short) – Steve
- The Secret Man (1917) – Bill – Molly's Brother
- A Marked Man (1917) – Ben Kent
- Bucking Broadway (1917) – Eugene Thornton
- The Phantom Riders (1918) – The Unknown
- Wild Women (1918) – Pegg
- Thieves' Gold (1918) – Curt Simmons
- The Scarlet Drop (1918) – Marley Calvert
- Hell Bent (1918) – Jack Thurston
- A Woman's Fool (1918) – Tommy Lusk
- The Black Horse Bandit (1919, Short)
- Bare Fists (1919) – Lopez
- The Border Terror – Zorro
- Riders of Vengeance (1919)
- The Outcasts of Poker Flat (1919)
- Ace of the Saddle (1919) – Gambler
- Rider of the Law (1919) – Nick Kyneton
- Vanishing Trails (1920) – Rankin
- The Galloping Devil (1920) – Pink
- The Fighting Stranger (1921) – Joe Kilburn
- The Last Chance (1921) – Black Sparr
- The Struggle (1921) – Diamond Joe
- The Raiders (1921) – Bob Thiele
- The Kickback (1922) – Ramon Pinellos
- Boomerang Justice (1922)
- Canyon of the Fools (1923) – Knute
- Lone Fighter (1923) – Harvey Bates
- His Own Law (1924)
- The Broken Law (1924)
- The Shield of Silence (1925)
- Wildfire (1925) – (uncredited)
- Rough Going (1925) – Jim Benson
- Tearin' Loose (1925) – Jim
- The Hurricane Horseman (1925) – Jim Marden
- Bucking the Truth (1926) – Sheriff Findlay
- 3 Bad Men (1926) – Henchman Shooting Lucas (uncredited)
- Jack O'Hearts (1926)
- The Flying Horseman (1926) – Henchman
- Man of the Forest (1926) – Moses
- The Desert Pirate (1927) – Henchman
- Yellow Contraband (1928) – Dude McClain
- Beyond the Law (1930) – Slade Henchman (uncredited)
- The Dawn Trail (1930) – Mac (uncredited)
- Not Exactly Gentlemen (1931) – Henchman (uncredited)
- The Sunset Trail (1932) – Connors (uncredited)
- Heritage of the Desert (1932) – Naab Man (uncredited)
- Sundown Rider (1932) – Ranch Hand (uncredited)
- Judge Priest (1934) – Joe Herringer (uncredited)
- The Dude Ranger (1934) – Brings Horse (uncredited)
- Elinor Norton (1934) – Ranch Hand (uncredited)
- Carnival (1935) – Small Town Man (uncredited)
- The Little Colonel (1935) – Frontiersman (uncredited)
- The Revenge Rider (1935) – Henchman Thomas (uncredited)
- Party Wire (1935) – Poker Quartet Member (uncredited)
- Steamboat Round the Bend (1935) – Mink – Pride of Paducah Pilot (uncredited)
- Gallant Defender (1935) – Cattleman (uncredited)
- The Prisoner of Shark Island (1936) – Soldier (uncredited)
- Forlorn River (1937) – Deputy Hank (uncredited)
- Wild and Woolly (1937) – Man on Street (uncredited)
- Thunder Trail (1937) – Tate Henchman (uncredited)
- Checkers (1937) – (uncredited)
- Born to the West (1937) – Bartender #2 (uncredited)
- Wells Fargo (1937) – Fargo Rider (uncredited)
- Stagecoach (1939) – Hank Plummer (uncredited)
- Trouble in Sundown (1939) – Posse Rider (uncredited)
- Frontier Pony Express (1939) – Henchman Doyle (uncredited)
- My Little Chickadee (1940) – Gambler (uncredited)
- Prairie Law (1940) – Henchman (uncredited)
- The Ranger and the Lady (1940) – Freighter (uncredited)
- Colorado (1940) – Sam Smith – Henchman
- Under Texas Skies (1940) – Henchman (uncredited)
- West of Abilene (1940) – Kennedy
- Sheriff of Tombstone (1941) – Henchman (uncredited)
- Best Man Wins (1948) – Creditor (uncredited)
