= Frank MacQuarrie =

American actor

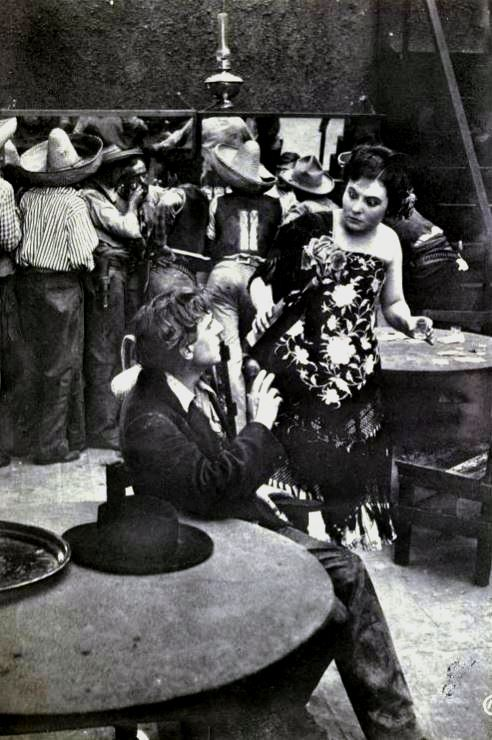
- Still of MacQuarrie and unidentified actress in The Black Box (1915)
- Born: January 27, 1875; San Francisco, California
- Died: December 25, 1950 (aged 75); Los Angeles, California
- Occupation: Actor
- Years active: 1915 - 1919

Frank MacQuarrie (January 27, 1875 in San Francisco – December 25, 1950 in Los Angeles) was an American silent film actor.

He was the brother of actors Albert MacQuarrie, George MacQuarrie and Murdock MacQuarrie.

== Filmography ==
- The Black Box (1915) .... Craig
- Jane's Declaration of Independence (1915)
- His Beloved Violin (1915)
- Haunting Winds (1915)
- The Mystery of the Tapestry Room (1915)
- Every Man's Money (1915)
- The Kiss of Dishonor (1915)
- Graft (1915)
- Just Plain Folks (1916)
- The Pool of Flame (1916) .... Des Trebes
- The Desperado (1916)
- Two Men of Sandy Bar (1916) .... Old Morton
- The Crimson Yoke (1916) .... Luridi
- The Social Slave (1916)
- Priscilla's Prisoner (1916)
- The Secret of the Swamp (1916) .... Deacon Todd
- From Broadway to a Throne (1916) .... Heldone
- A Daughter of the Night (1916)
- The Decoy (1916)
- Society's Hypocrites (1916)
- The Voice on the Wire (1917)
- The Boss of the Lazy Y (1917) .... Tom Taggart
- A 44-Calibre Mystery (1917)
- The Almost Good Man (1917)
- The Field of Honor (1917) .... Amos Tolliver
- A Five Foot Ruler (1917)
- The Charmer (1917) (credited as Frank McQuarrie) .... Judge Applebee
- A Stormy Knight (1917) (credited as Frank McQuarrie) .... Mr. Weller
- Flirting with Death (1917)
- The Man Trap (1917) .... Finch
- The Maternal Spark (1917) .... Lansing Hawley
- The High Sign (1917) (credited as Frank McQuarrie) .... Metwer
- The Flash of Fate (1918)
- Little Red Decides (1918)
- Wolves of the Border (1918) .... Joe Warner
- Madame Sphinx (1918) .... Henri Du Bois
- The Girl of My Dreams (1918) .... Pa Williams
- Whitewashed Walls (1919) .... Cascaro
- Loot (1919) .... Jacques
- Under Suspicion (1919) .... Greggs
- The Lone Hand (1919)
