= The Sheriff's Dilemma =

1915 film

- Starring: Harry Carey
- Release date: April 2, 1915
- Country: United States
- Languages: Silent; English intertitles

The Sheriff's Dilemma is a 1915 American short silent Western film featuring Harry Carey.

== Cast ==
- Harry Carey as The Sheriff
- Claire McDowell
- Charles West (credited as Charles H. West)

== See also ==
- Harry Carey filmography
