= The Black Box (serial) =

1915 film

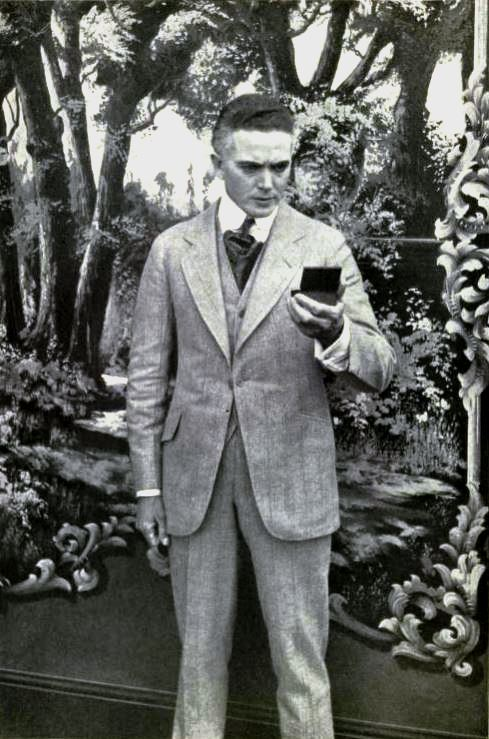
- Still with Herbert Rawlinson
- Directed by: Otis Turner
- Written by: E. Phillips Oppenheim; Otis Turner; Jeanie MacPherson
- Produced by: Otis Turner
- Starring: Herbert Rawlinson
- Production company: Universal Film Manufacturing Co.
- Distributed by: Universal Film Manufacturing Co.
- Release date: March 14, 1915
- Running time: 15 episodes
- Country: United States
- Language: Silent (English intertitles)

The Black Box is a 1915 American drama film serial directed by Otis Turner. This serial is considered to be lost. The film was written in part by E. Phillips Oppenheim, a popular novelist at the time. The story was published in 1915 as a novel and as a newspaper serial. Both published editions were illustrated by photographic stills taken from the movie serial. In the novel version, about 30 stills from the movie are preserved. These can be seen in the Gutenberg.org version.

== Plot ==
The plot follows enigmatic criminologist Sanford Quest as he solves various crimes around New York City through unique methods.

== Cast ==
- Herbert Rawlinson as Sanford Quest
- Ann Little as Lenora MacDougal (credited as Anna Little)
- William Worthington as Professor Ashleigh / Lord Ashleigh
- Mark Fenton as Police Officer
- Laura Oakley as Laura, Quest's Assistant
- Frank MacQuarrie as Craig
- Frank Lloyd as Ian MacDouglas
- Helen Wright as Lady Ashleigh
- Beatrice Van as Ashleigh's Daughter
- Hylda Hollis as Mrs. Bruce Reinholdt (credited as Hilda Sloman)
- J. Edwin Brown
- Dorothy Brown
- Duke Worne
- Harry Tenbrook as Thug
- Lionel Bradshaw
- Osborne Chase

== Chapter titles ==
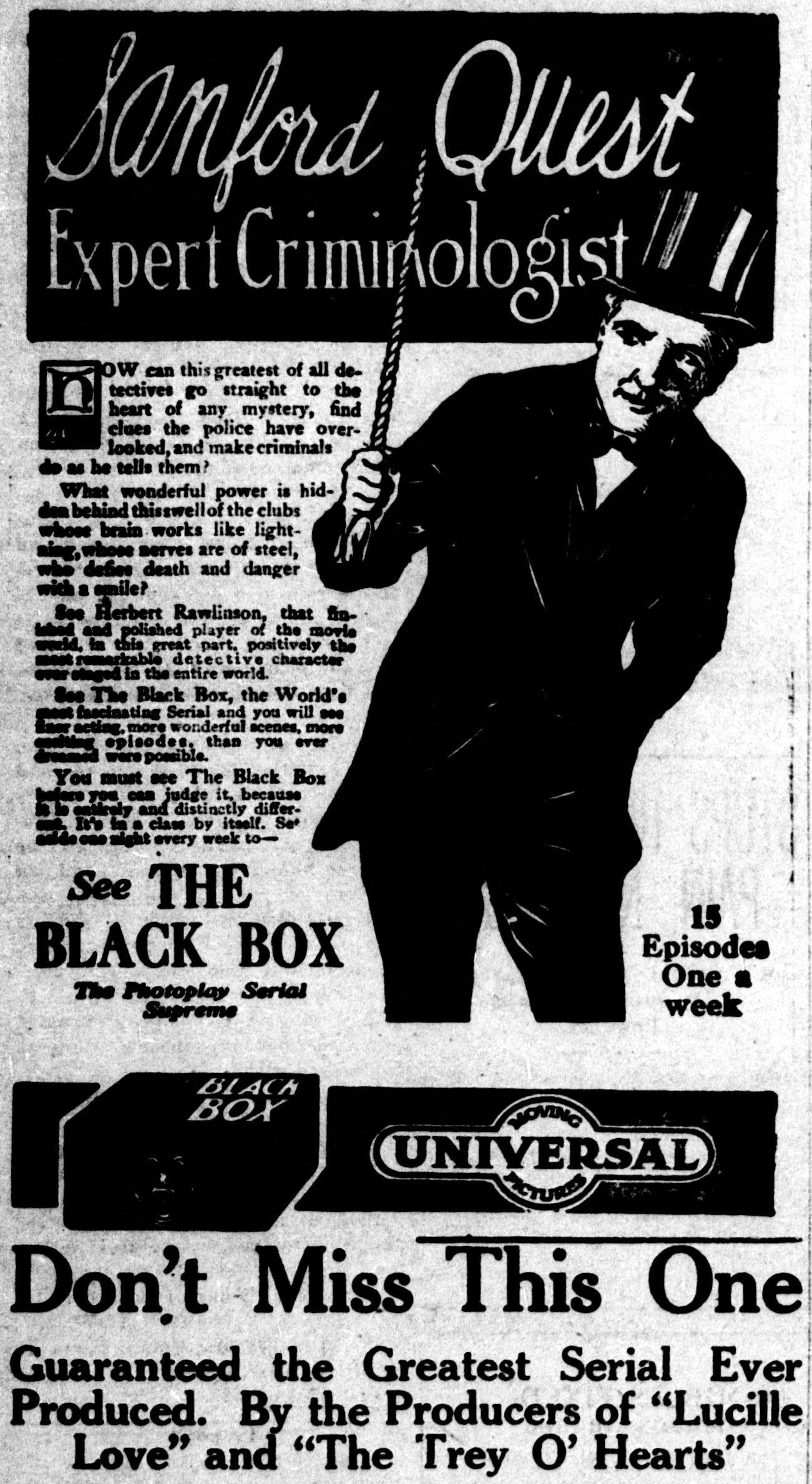
Newspaper advertisement

1. An Apartment House Mystery
2. The Hidden Hands
3. The Pocket Wireless
4. An Old Grudge
5. On the Rack
6. The Unseen Terror
7. The House of Mystery
8. The Inherited Sin
9. Lost in London
10. The Ship of Horror
11. A Desert Vengeance
12. ’Neath Iron Wheels
13. Tongues of Flame
14. A Bolt from the Blue
15. The Black Box

== See also ==
- List of American films of 1915
- List of film serials
- List of film serials by studio
