= Cheyenne's Pal =

1917 film directed by John Ford

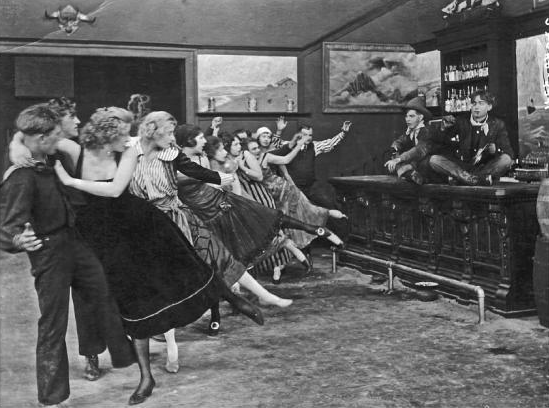
- Directed by: John Ford
- Written by: John Ford; Charles J. Wilson
- Starring: Harry Carey
- Cinematography: Friend Baker
- Production company: Universal Studios
- Distributed by: Universal Studios
- Release date: August 4, 1917
- Running time: 20 minutes
- Country: United States
- Languages: Silent; English intertitles

Cheyenne's Pal is a 1917 American silent Western film directed by John Ford and featuring Harry Carey. The film is considered to be lost.

== Plot ==
As described in a film magazine, Noisy Jim (Corey), a British officer, is anxious to purchase Cactus Peter, the horse belonging to Cheyenne Harry (Carey), but Harry refuses to sell. Harry meets Flora Belle (Astor) one night at the dance hall. Since it's pay day, Harry spends all of his money on her, and when he runs out, she looks around for someone else who still has money to spend.

Angered, Harry goes out, sells Cactus Pete, and returns with more money. When he awakens the next day from his drunken stupor and realizes what he has done, he is consumed with regret and goes to recover his horse. He steals his horse, but is ordered shot for the act. When the fatal hour nears, the British officer relents, and Harry is allowed to go free.

== Cast ==
- Gertrude Astor as Girl From Dancing Hall
- Harry Carey as Harry "Cheyenne Harry" Henderson
- Pete Carey as Pete "Cactus Pete The Horse"
- Jim Corey as Jim "Noisy Jim"
- Hoot Gibson as Cowboy
- Ed Jones as Cowboy
- Vester Pegg as Cowboy
- Steve Pimento as Cowboy
- William Steele (credited as Bill Gettinger) as Cowboy

== Production ==
Filming took place over a three-day period (May 23–25, 1917) under the working titles Cactus My Pal and The Dumb Friend. The finished film was released by Universal Studios as a 20-minute silent film on two reels. The film is part of the "Cheyenne Harry" series of film featurettes, and was initially released as a promotional tool for the sale of American war bonds during World War I.

== See also ==
- John Ford filmography
- Harry Carey filmography
- Hoot Gibson filmography
- List of American films of 1917
- List of lost films
