= His Desperate Deed =

1915 film

- Starring: Harry Carey
- Release date: March 18, 1915
- Country: United States
- Language: Silent with English intertitles

His Desperate Deed is a 1915 American drama film featuring Harry Carey.

== Cast ==
- Kate Bruce
- Harry Carey as Burleigh
- Blanche Sweet
- Charles West (credited as Charles H. West)

== See also ==
- Harry Carey filmography
