= George Berrell =

American actor (1849–1933)

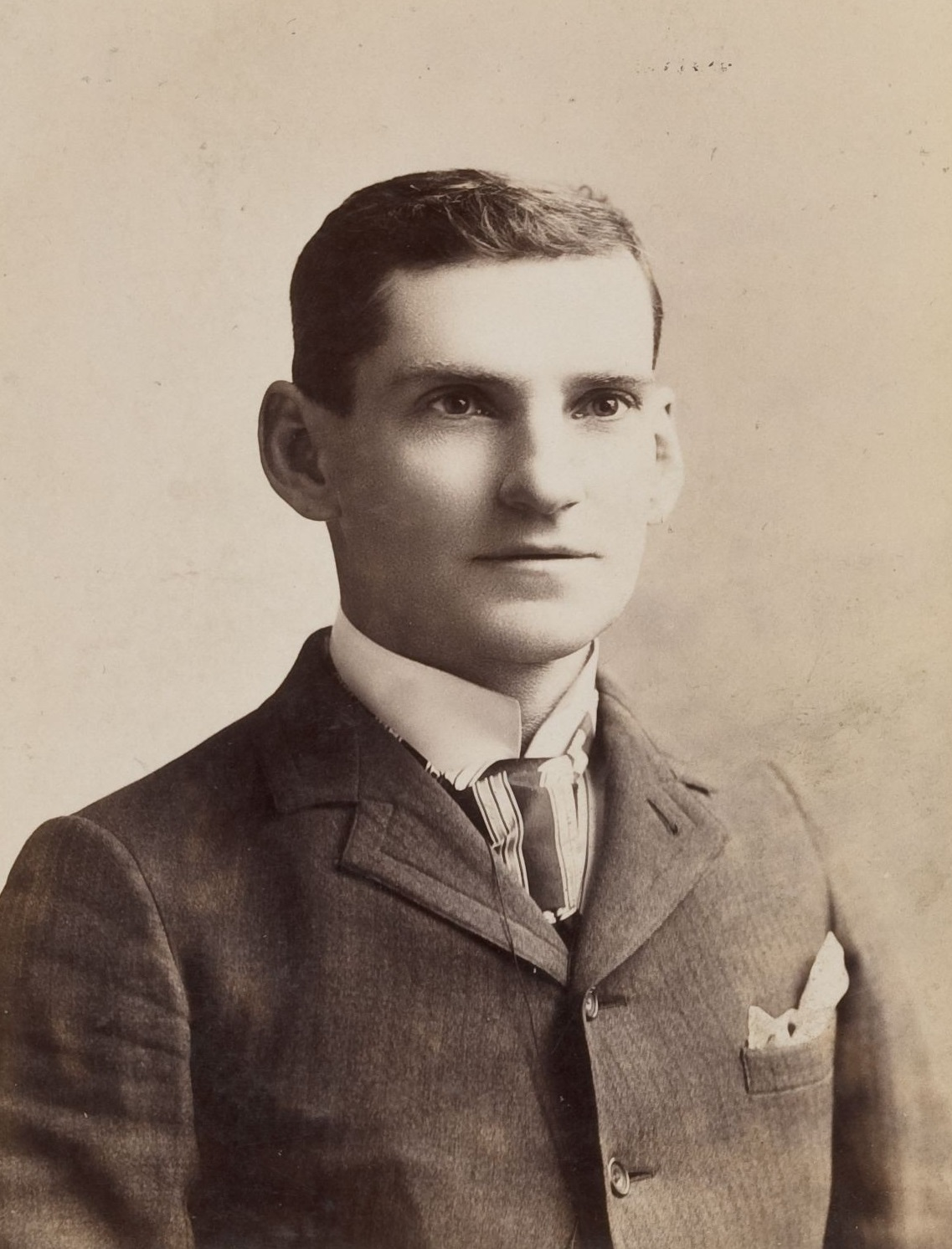
- Photo by William McKenzie Morrison
- Born: December 16, 1849; Philadelphia, Pennsylvania, US
- Died: April 20, 1933 (aged 83); Los Angeles, California, US
- Occupation: Actor
- Years active: 1850–1927

George Berrell (December 16, 1849 – April 20, 1933) was an American actor of both the 19th and early 20th century stage and of the silent film era. He appeared in numerous stage plays as well as more than 50 films over the course of a career that ran from 1850 to 1927.

== Biography ==
Born in Philadelphia, Pennsylvania on December 16, 1849, Berrell joined the Gardiner Theatre Company in October 1874, earning a salary that was less than the eighty dollars per week paid individually to its top three stars. In later years, Berrell was signed to a two-year contract with the Neil Shipman Production syndicate in Spokane, Washington. During that time, he appeared on screen and toured the United States and Canada, performing in a variety of theatrical productions.

Berrell died in Los Angeles, California on April 20, 1933.

== Selected filmography ==
- Bound on the Wheel (1915)
- Mountain Justice (1915)
- Lon of Lone Mountain (1915)
- The Three Godfathers (1916)
- The Committee on Credentials (1916)
- The Flashlight (1917)
- The Golden Bullet (1917)
- The Wrong Man (1917)
- Straight Shooting (1917)
- The Lair of the Wolf (1917)
- In for Thirty Days (1919)
- As the Sun Went Down (1919)
- The City of Masks (1920)
- The Dwelling Place of Light (1920)
- The U.P. Trail (1920)
- The Barbarian (1920)
- The Fire Eater (1921)
- Tracks (1922)
- The Grub-Stake (1923)
- The Everlasting Whisper (1925)
- The Sea Beast (1926)
- Hotel Imperial (1927)
- Black Jack (1927)
