= The Phantom Riders =

1918 film directed by John Ford

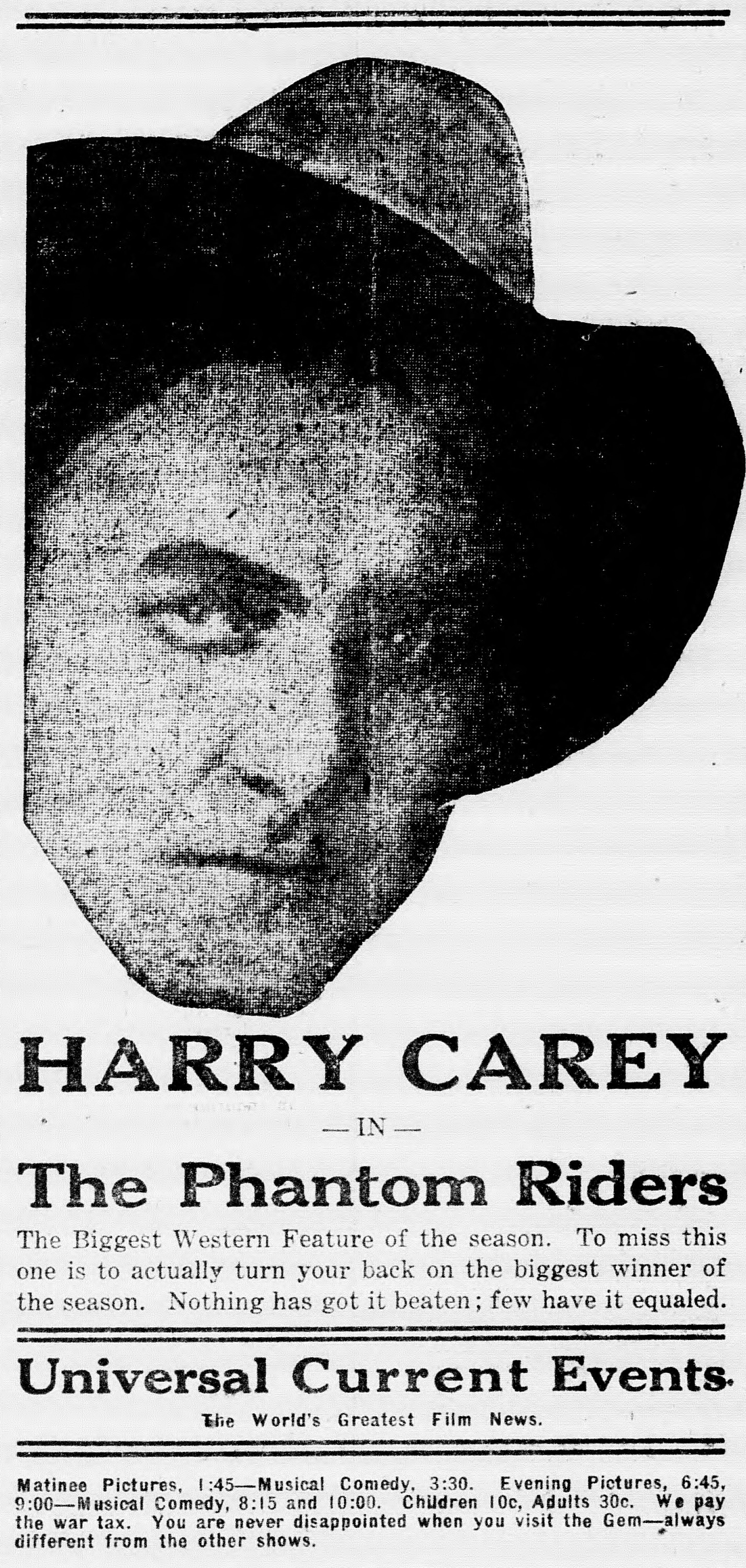
- Newspaper advertisement
- Directed by: John Ford
- Written by: George Hively; Henry MacRae
- Produced by: Harry Carey
- Starring: Harry Carey
- Cinematography: John W. Brown; Ben F. Reynolds
- Distributed by: Universal Film Manufacturing Co.
- Release date: January 28, 1918
- Running time: 50 minutes
- Country: United States
- Languages: Silent; English intertitles

The Phantom Riders is a 1918 silent American Western film directed by John Ford and featuring Harry Carey. The film is considered to be lost.

== Plot ==
As described in a film magazine, Dave Bland (Steele), head of a band of cattle rustlers operating in Paradise Valley, is defied by Cheyenne Harry (Carey) who has driven his heard into the valley to graze. Bland calls his phantom riders together, routes Harry's cattle, and then seeks their owner intent on taking his life. The Unknown (Pegg), an influential member of the gang who has a grievance against Harry, claims the right to settle with him and this is agreed to. In the meantime, Molly Grant (Malone) prevails upon her father Pebble Grant (Connors) to warn Harry of the danger. The rustlers discover this and hang Grant, and Molly is forced to marry Bland. Hearing that Harry is in a nearby saloon, the gang rushes the place. A gunfight follows and Harry and his partner inflict many casualties. Rangers who were notified by Molly arrive and route the gang. The film ends with the distant chimes of wedding bells for Cheyenne Harry and Molly.

== Cast ==
- Harry Carey as Harry "Cheyenne Harry" Henderson
- William Steele as Dave Bland (credited as Bill Gettinger)
- Molly Malone as Molly Grant
- Buck Connors as "Pebble" Grant (credited as Buck Connor)
- Vester Pegg as The Unknown
- Jim Corey as Foreman

== Production ==
Filming took place from September 7–27, 1917. Released in January 1918 as a Universal Special feature, The Phantom Riders was a 50-minute silent film on five reels, part of the "Cheyenne Harry" series of film featurettes. The original story was written by Henry McRae and adapted for the screen by scenarist George Hively.

== Reception ==
Like many American films of the time, The Phantom Riders was subject to cuts by city and state film censorship boards. The Chicago Board of Censors required cuts, in Reel 1, of the shooting of a man at the roulette wheel, three scenes of men laughing at dying man, all scenes of man with knife, indicating slitting of man's mouth, the intertitle "For miles around the phantoms gathered" etc., all except first two scenes of phantoms gathering, Reel 3, two intertitles "We've got his cattle, now let's get him" and "Let's run his cattle to death", all scenes of cattle rustling, five closeups of masked man and thirteen scenes of men assembling, Reel 4, shooting man off horse, three holdup scenes inside cabin, two closeups of masked man alone and view of masked men, entrance of masked man into hut and taking gun from man, two scenes of man hanging from tree, five intertitles "Joe Norton has proved himself a traitor" etc., "You are a sneaking skunk", "Vengeance of the phantoms", "Cheyenne kept his appointment", and "They hung the fellow who tipped us off", Reel 5, four scenes of the holdup of Cheyenne in saloon, reduce length of all shooting and fight scenes, closeup of man shooting around corner of saloon, man fallowing from ladder, four dead body scenes, Cheyenne shooting man and his falling in saloon, all but five shooting scenes between Cheyenne and raiders, all but five fight scenes between rangers and raiders, and to eliminate the trailer.

== See also ==
- John Ford filmography
- Harry Carey filmography
- List of lost films
