= William Steele (actor) =

American actor (1888–1966)

- Born: William Anton Gittinger; March 28, 1888; San Antonio, Texas, U.S.
- Died: February 13, 1966 (aged 77); Los Angeles, California, U.S.
- Occupation: Actor
- Years active: 1912–1956

William Anton Gittinger (March 28, 1888 – February 13, 1966), best known as William Steele, was an American actor of small roles in Westerns, particularly those of John Ford.

== Biography ==
Although his screen credits and many records indicate a wide variety of names and spellings, Steele's own signatures on his military documents indicate that he was born William Anton Gittinger on March 28, 1888 (not 1889, as some sources have it) in San Antonio, Texas. Little is known of his life prior to his arrival in Los Angeles around 1910. As the film industry in Hollywood was just blossoming, and as he apparently had great experience with horses, Steele easily obtained work in quickie Westerns. He fought in Europe in World War I, then returned to Hollywood. While he was extremely inconsistent in the names he used, he worked consistently in Westerns throughout the silent era and up until the 1950s. His final appearance was as the wounded posse member Nesby in Ford's The Searchers in 1956, his tenth film for Ford. He died ten years later, not quite 78 years old. He was survived by his wife Josephine, an actress. He is buried under his birth name at Fort Sam Houston National Cemetery in San Antonio, Texas.

== Stage names ==
- Billy Gettinger
- Bill Gettinger
- William Gettinger
- William Gittenger
- Bill Steele
- Robert Steele
- W.A. Steele
- William A. Steele
- William Steuer
- William Steele

== Partial filmography ==
- The Ring of Destiny (1915, Short) - The Cattle Rustler
- A Knight of the Range (1916) - Burk
- Blood Money (1917, Short) - Dan Beckham
- The Bad Man of Cheyenne (1917, Short) - The Sheriff
- Her Own People (1917) -Polsa Kar
- The Outlaw and the Lady (1917, Short) - The Sheriff
- Goin' Straight (1917, Short) - Sheriff Dan Bekham
- The Fighting Gringo (1917) - Jim
- Hair-Trigger Burke (1917, Short) - The Sheriff
- A 44-Calibre Mystery (1917, Short) - Deputy Sheriff Horton
- The Mysterious Outlaw (1917, Short) - Henry Martin
- The Golden Bullet (1917, Short) - Crazy Creek Sheriff
- The Wrong Man (1917, Short) - Larry Malone
- Six-Shooter Justice (1917, Short) - Mike Hernandez
- The Soul Herder (1917, Short) - Bill Young
- Cheyenne's Pal (1917, Short) - Cowboy
- The Texas Sphinx (1917, Short) - Dick Lonagan
- The Secret Man (1917) - The Foreman
- A Marked Man (1917) - Sheriff
- Bucking Broadway (1917) - Buck Hoover
- The Phantom Riders (1918) - Dave Bland
- The Misfit Wife (1920) - Duff Simpson
- The Stranger (1920) - Dr. Tyke
- The Avenging Arrow (1921) - Don Carlos Martinez
- The Wallop (1921) - Christopher Foy
- Riding with Death (1921) - Chick Dillon
- Pardon My Nerve! (1922) - Nebraska Jones
- The Fast Mail (1922) - Pierre La Fitte
- Bells of San Juan (1922) - Kid Rickard
- Single Handed (1923) - Windy Smith
- Dead Game (1923) - Sam Antone
- Don Quickshot of the Rio Grande (1923) - Bill Barton
- Shootin' for Love (1923) - Dan Hobson
- Hit and Run (1924) - The Gopher
- The Sunset Trail (1924) - Brand Williams
- The Last Man on Earth (1924) - Hattie's Father
- The Ridin' Kid from Powder River (1924) - 'Lightnin' Bill Smith
- The Hurricane Kid (1925) - Lafe Baxter
- The Saddle Hawk (1925) - Steve Kern
- Let 'er Buck (1925) - Kent Crosby
- Don Dare Devil (1925) - Benito Menocal
- The Sagebrush Lady (1925) - Sheriff Martin
- Ace of Spades (1925) - Jim Heath
- Two-Fisted Jones (1925) - Hank Gage
- Under Western Skies (1926) - Fleming
- A Six Shootin' Romance (1926) - Currier King
- The Flaming Frontier (1926) - Penfield
- The Fighting Peacemaker (1926) - Clell Danert
- The Wild Horse Stampede (1926) - Charlie Champion
- The Ridin' Rascal (1926)
- The Runaway Express (1926) - Blackie McPherson
- Rough and Ready (1927) - Morris Manning
- Loco Luck (1927) - Frank Lambert
- The Valley of Hell (1927) - James Brady
- Whispering Sage (1927) - Tom Kildare
- Range Courage (1927) - Tex Lucas
- Hoof Marks (1927) - Sam Trapp
- The Fearless Rider (1928) - Dr. Lucifer Blade
- The Call of the Heart (1928) - Dave Crenshaw
- Thunder Riders (1928) - Lem Dawson
- The Black Ace (1928)
- The Lone Star Ranger (1930) - First Deputy
- Doughboys (1930) - Lieutenant Randolph
- Flaming Guns (1932) - Rustler (uncredited)
- The California Trail (1933) - Pedro
- King of the Arena (1933) - (uncredited)
- Gordon of Ghost City (1933, Serial) - Bob (Ch. 11) (uncredited)
- Laughing Boy (1934) - Guide (uncredited)
- The Vanishing Shadow (1934, Serial) - Henchman (uncredited)
- The Red Rider (1934, Serial) - Townsman (uncredited)
- Rocky Rhodes (1934) - Cowhand (uncredited)
- When a Man Sees Red (1934) - Henchman Speck
- For the Service (1936) - Henchman (uncredited)
- Marie Antoinette (1938) - Footman (uncredited)
- The Westerner (1940) - Tex Cole (uncredited)
- The Outlaw (1943) - Deputy (uncredited)
- San Antonio (1945) - Roper (uncredited)
- Two Guys from Texas (1948) - Townsman (uncredited)
- She Wore a Yellow Ribbon (1949) - Officer (uncredited)
- Colt .45 (1950) - Henchman (uncredited)
- The Showdown (1950) - Terry
- Copper Canyon (1950) - Roper (uncredited)
- The Searchers (1956) - Nesby (uncredited) (final film role)
