= A 44-Calibre Mystery =

1917 film

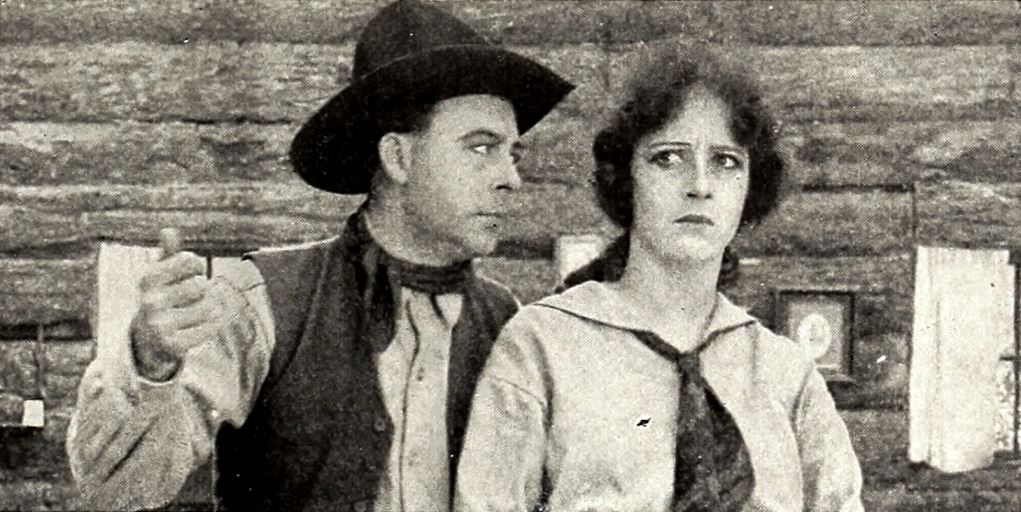
- Still with Carey and Du Brey
- Directed by: Fred Kelsey
- Written by: T. Shelley Sutton; F. A. Meredith
- Starring: Harry Carey
- Distributed by: Universal Film Manufacturing Company
- Release date: May 22, 1917
- Country: United States
- Languages: Silent; English intertitles

A 44-Calibre Mystery is a 1917 American short Western film, featuring Harry Carey. Carey plays the role of Sheriff Cheyenne Harry. He saves Kitty Flanders from Pete McGuire and takes her safely home. McGuire hides in a shack on Mr. Flanders' stake and Harry's deputy is shot dead, apparently by Mr. Flanders. McGuire offers to keep quiet about the murder if Flanders gives him half a stake and his daughter's hand in marriage. Mr. Flanders confesses his crime to Sheriff Harry and learns that he is innocent. Sheriff Harry notices McGuire's gun and accuses him of the crime, but they are killed as they try to escape. The film concludes as Kitty Flanders confesses her love to Sheriff Cheyenne as she bandages his wounds from the fight.

Originally released in 1917, the film was later revised and re-titled as Sure-Shot Morgan and possibly released in 1919, and also re-released under both names in 1922. The film garnered little critic attention and the first summary of the film came from the two-reel revised release with a positive review. The film was directed by Fred Kelsey and released by Universal Film Manufacturing Company. The film's status is unknown.

== Plot ==
Set in the town of Driftwood, the film begins when Pete McGuire, known by the alias "Lone Jack" arrives in town and molests Kitty Flanders. Sheriff Cheyenne Harry intervenes and knocks down McGuire and takes Kitty Flanders to her home. McGuire becomes aware that Sheriff Harry's deputy, Horton, is out to arrest him and McGuire hides out on a shack on Flanders' claim. Horton is later killed, apparently by Mr. Flanders, and McGuire offers to keep quiet in exchange that he gives him half a stake in the claim and have Kitty Flanders marry him. Later, Sheriff Harry learns that Horton was killed by a 44-Calibre round. Mr. Flanders confesses to Sheriff Harry that he shot and killed Horton, but the sheriff points out that his gun was of a different size. Sheriff Harry notices that McGuire's gun is a 44-Calibre and accuses him of killing Horton. McGuire and an accomplice attempt to escape, but are killed by the Sheriff in a fight. Kitty Flanders confesses her love to Sheriff Cheyenne as she bandages his wounds. (Note: This plot summary comes from the two-reel revision as no account of the three-reel publication has been found from the original 1917 release in newspapers, trade publications or fan magazines.)

== Cast ==
- Harry Carey as Sheriff Harry "Cheyenne Harry" Henderson
- Claire Du Brey as Kitty Flanders
- Hoot Gibson
- Frank MacQuarrie
- Vester Pegg
- William Steele (credited as William Gettinger (Bill Gettinger)
- Maude Emory

== Production and release ==
The screen story originates from T. Shelley Sutton and was adapted to the scenario by Charles J. Wilson. However, Exhibitor's Trade Review states that while Shelley Sutton wrote the film, the scenario was instead adapted by F. A. Meredith. The film was directed by Fred Kelsey. The Universal Film Manufacturing Company released the film on May 22, 1917. The three reel film was marketed by Universal under the "Gold Seal" label and was advertised as a higher quality work that had a higher cost than other productions in return for bolstering the returns of a weak feature or show by drawing additional patrons.

The Silent Film Era website states that this film was edited down to two-reels and was re-released as Sure-Shot Morgan on September 4, 1922, and/or October 28, 1922. The April 1923 Motion Picture News Booking Guide states that Sure-Shot Morgan was released on September 4, 1922. However, an earlier reference exists for Sure-Shot Morgan as a Universal Special Attraction released on February 1, 1919. This mention also includes the note that the film was already in a two-reel state and stars Harry Carey. A newspaper record for a "Sure-Shot Morgan" appears on February 1, 1919, in The Wichita Daily Eagle, but lacks further details. The next mention in a newspaper is in The Wilmington Morning Star on February 8, 1919, and attributes the star of Sure-Shot Morgan as Neal Burns and in another ad on the same page as Neal Hart. Despite the conflicting information, the next newspaper mentions of Sure-Shot Morgan occurs after the 1922 release date and notes again that Harry Carey stars in the film. (Note: The confusing nature of this film's release has been picked up in various sources and compounded by the minimal information on the releases. The original 1917 release seems to have made a little impact, resulting in added confusion with the re-titled release in 1919 as Sure-Shot Morgan which was seemingly brief and ran again with both titles in the 1922 re-release. As a result Screen World Presents the Encyclopedia of Hollywood Film Actors: From the silent era to 1965, Volume 1 lists 1917 as the release of A 44-Calibre Mystery and 1919 as the release of Sure-Shot Morgan under Harry Carey's film credits. A Guide to Silent Westerns instead states that Sure-Shot Morgan was created in 1917 and released in 1922 as a 3 reeler with the absence of Frank McQuarrie in its credit. Langman's book also has an entry for A 44-Calibre Mystery that notes the cast and states that the film was re-released in 1922, but does not explain or connect the film to Sure-Shot Morgan. Differences in the Sure-Shot Morgan and A 44-Calibre Mystery have not been noted in any known source and both films have been variously reported as having both three and two reels in various sources.)

The revision down to two reels was kept for the re-release of A 44-Calibre Mystery. The film did not receive a much attention and the first summary of the plot occurred after its revision. Critical reception of the film and its analysis was scarce in publications. In 1922, the Exhibitors Trade Review said the two-reel reissue of A 44-Calibre Mystery is "good in spite of or perhaps because of the fact that it really is 'wild and wooley' as well." The original 1917 production was also said to be popular with fans of western melodramas.

The film's status is unknown, but it is presumably among the 90% of all American silent films that are lost.

== See also ==
- Harry Carey filmography
- Hoot Gibson filmography
