= The Outlaw and the Lady =

1917 film

- Directed by: Fred Kelsey
- Written by: Harry Carey; Fred Kelsey
- Starring: Harry Carey
- Release date: February 10, 1917
- Country: United States
- Languages: Silent; English intertitles

The Outlaw and the Lady is a 1917 film featuring Harry Carey and released by Universal Pictures.

== Cast ==
- Harry Carey
- Louise Lovely
- Jack Richardson
- William Steele - (as William Gettinger)
- Vester Pegg
- Tote Du Crow - Butler

== See also ==
- Harry Carey filmography
