= The Soul Herder =

1917 film directed by John Ford

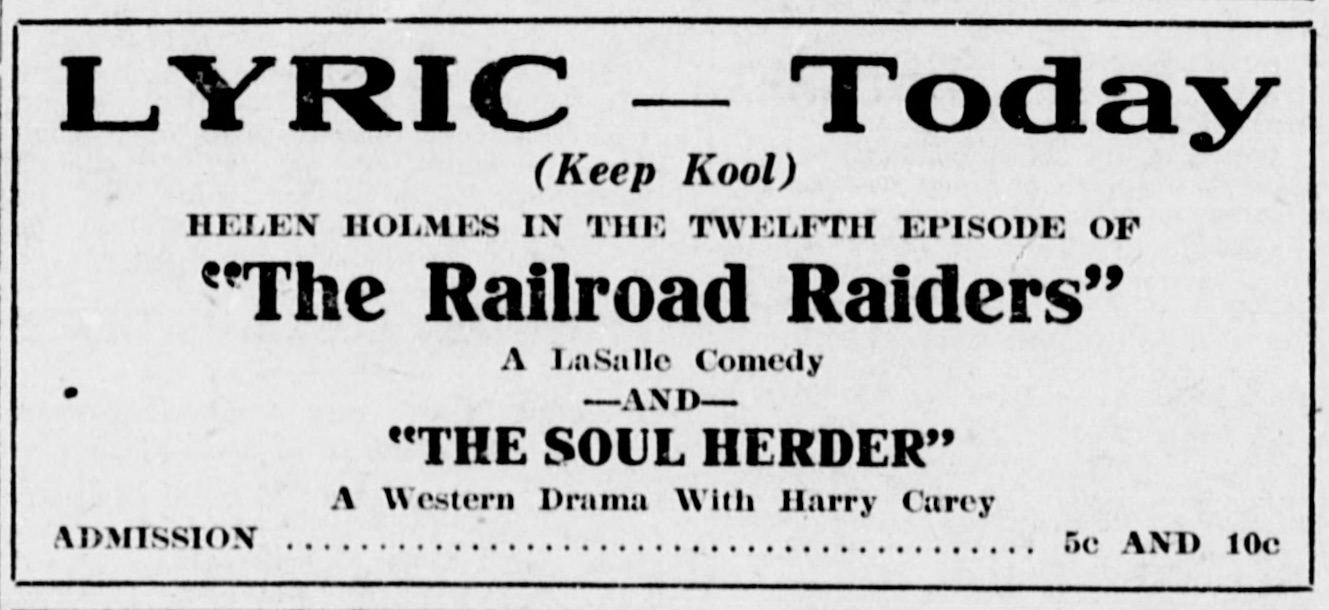
- Newspaper advertisement
- Directed by: John Ford
- Written by: George Hively
- Starring: Harry Carey
- Cinematography: Ben F. Reynolds
- Production company: New York Motion Picture Company
- Distributed by: Universal Film Manufacturing Co.
- Release date: August 3, 1917
- Running time: 30 minutes
- Country: United States
- Languages: Silent; English intertitles

The Soul Herder is a 1917 American silent Western film directed by John Ford, and featuring Harry Carey. The film is presumed to be lost. The film was premiered in Dayton, Ohio, on August 3, 1917.

== Cast ==
- Harry Carey as Harry "Cheyenne Harry" Henderson
- Molly Malone
- Hoot Gibson
- Jean Hersholt as Priest
- Fritzi Ridgeway
- Duke R. Lee
- William Steele (credited as William Gettinger)
- Elizabeth James as Daughter
- Vester Pegg

== Reception ==
Like many American films of the time, The Soul Herder was subject to cuts by city and state film censorship boards. The Chicago Board of Censors ordered cut scenes showing the shooting of a clergyman, a man muffling a girl in a bedroom, killing a man outside a house, and the closeup of a dead man.

== See also ==
- Harry Carey filmography
- Hoot Gibson filmography
- List of lost films
