= The Black Horse Bandit =

1919 film

- Directed by: Harry Harvey
- Written by: George Hively
- Starring: Hoot Gibson
- Production company: Universal Pictures
- Distributed by: Universal Pictures
- Release date: February 1, 1919
- Running time: 20 minutes
- Country: United States
- Languages: Silent; English intertitles

The Black Horse Bandit is a 1919 American short silent Western film directed by Harry Harvey and featuring Hoot Gibson.

== Plot ==
According to a film magazine, "In the little Western town of Jawbone, Bill Graham, the sheriff, is killed by a mysterious outlaw, who has been roaming the country. The citizens of Jawbone elect Joe Graham, his son, as sheriff. Joe, having been raised in the East, is somewhat of a coward and does not know how to handle the rough Western element.

Two strangers ride into Jawbone. One of them, Hugh Manville, rides a beautiful coal-black horse, while the other. Jack Morgan, rides a pinto. Both meet Dolly Graham, the former sheriff's daughter, and fall in love with her. A bunch of cowpunchers, learning of the new sheriff, come to town with the intention of "shooting it up." Joe, called upon to quiet them and stop the disturbance, shows his yellow streak and is afraid to attempt to stop them. Dolly, his sister, takes his badge from him, and, going to the saloon, quells the disturbance.

The country lives in fear of the "black horse bandit," who has repeatedly robbed the stage and made his escape; and the people are at a loss to understand his mysterious operations. The stage arrives at Jawbone after having been robbed by the bandit with the black horse. Attention is drawn to the fact that the only black horse in the country is the one which Hugh rides. Hugh, led to believe someone else is riding his horse, lays a trap for them. Joe sees Hugh ride from town on his black horse. Dolly also learns that Hugh is suspected and follows.

The stage is held up, but this time by Morgan, on his pinto. Hugh rides in and stops the hold-up, but Morgan escapes, and he and his companions meet Dolly coming from the town. Realizing that his plans have miscarried, Morgan takes Dolly from her horse and escapes to a deserted cabin with her. Hugh locates her and, with the assistance of Joe, who redeems himself and who has arrived with a small posse, Dolly is rescued from Morgan and his. companions. Morgan, mortally wounded, confesses that he had been stealing Hugh's horse for his hold-ups. Dolly, who had always been unable to believe that Hugh was guilty, gives herself to Hugh as his reward."

== Cast ==
- Hoot Gibson as Joe Graham
- Helen Gibson as Dolly
- Pete Morrison as Hugh Manville
- Vester Pegg as Jack Morgan
- Buck Connors as Dad Graham

== Reception ==
The Black Horse Bandit was a "two-reel melodrama", described as "thrilling."

== See also ==
- List of American films of 1919
- Hoot Gibson filmography
