= The Lone Hand (1919 film) =

1919 film

- Directed by: George Holt
- Written by: Arthur Henry Gooden
- Starring: Hoot Gibson
- Release date: December 13, 1919
- Running time: 20 minutes
- Country: United States
- Languages: Silent; English intertitles

The Lone Hand is a 1919 American short silent Western film directed by George Holt and featuring Hoot Gibson. A print is preserved in the Library of Congress collection.

== Cast ==
- Hoot Gibson
- Josephine Hill
- Frank MacQuarrie
- Charles Brinley
