= Bill Sharkey's Last Game =

1909 film directed by D. W. Griffith

- Directed by: D. W. Griffith
- Starring: Harry Carey
- Release date: 1909
- Country: United States
- Language: Silent (English intertitles)

Bill Sharkey's Last Game is a 1909 (Note: Some sources disagree on the precise year of the film, ranging from 1908 to 1910) American silent film directed by D. W. Griffith and starring Harry Carey in his debut film. The film's story drew from the life and death of Walla Tonka, a Choctaw baseball player who was convicted of murder. He was permitted continue playing baseball after his sentence was handed down, with the agreement that he would be executed after playing in his last baseball game.

== Cast ==
- Harry Carey

== See also ==
- List of American films of 1909
- Harry Carey filmography
- D. W. Griffith filmography
- 1909 in film
