= A Gun Fightin' Gentleman =

1919 film directed by John Ford

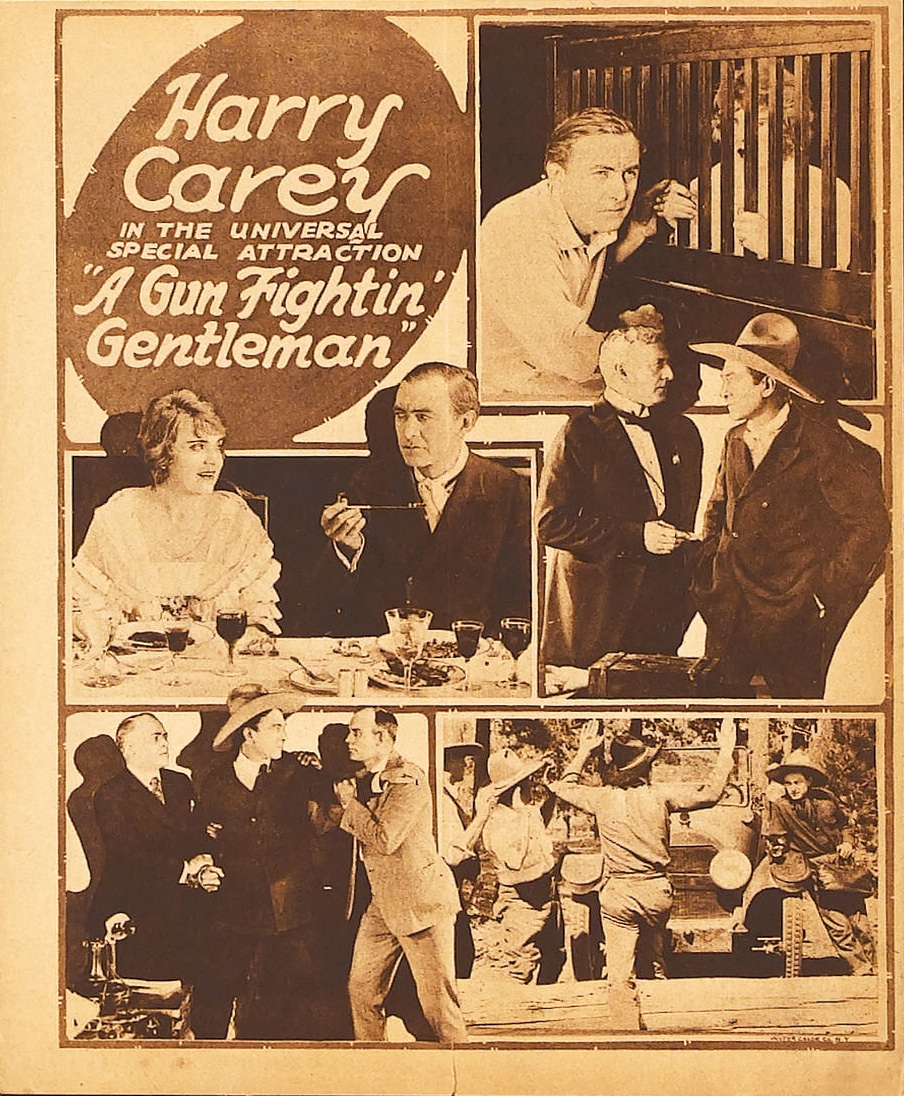
- Film poster
- Directed by: John Ford
- Written by: Harry Carey; John Ford; Hal Hoadley
- Produced by: Pat Powers
- Starring: Harry Carey
- Cinematography: John W. Brown
- Distributed by: Universal Film Manufacturing Company
- Release date: November 29, 1919
- Running time: 50 minutes
- Country: United States
- Languages: Silent; English intertitles

A Gun Fightin' Gentleman is a 1919 American Western film directed by John Ford and starring Harry Carey. Because only three reels of originally five or six are known to exist, this film is considered a partially lost film.

== Plot ==
As described in a film magazine, ranch owner Cheyenne Harry is the victim of a plot engineered by land speculator John Merritt, who uses a doctored title to deprive Harry of his land holdings. Powerless in the face of his opponent's superior knowledge of the law, Harry is forced to retaliate by appropriating Merritt's payroll. Later he abducts Merritt's daughter Helen and holds her pending settlement of their dispute. A settlement is effected in due time, but not before Harry has won the heart of the young woman.

== Cast ==
- Harry Carey as Harry "Cheyenne Harry" Henderson
- J. Barney Sherry as John Merritt
- Kathleen O'Connor as Helen Merritt
- Harry von Meter as Earl of Jollywell (credited as Harry V. Meter)
- Lydia Yeamans Titus as Helen's Aunt (credited as Lydia Titus)
- Duke R. Lee as Buck Regan
- Joe Harris as Seymour
- John Cook as Old Sheriff (credited as Johnnie Cooke)
- Ted Brooks as The Youngster

== See also ==
- Harry Carey filmography
- List of incomplete or partially lost films
