= The Honor of an Outlaw =

1917 film

- Directed by: Fred Kelsey
- Written by: Fred Kelsey
- Starring: Harry Carey
- Distributed by: Universal Pictures
- Release date: May 15, 1917
- Country: United States
- Languages: Silent; English intertitles

The Honor of an Outlaw is a 1917 American short silent Western film featuring Harry Carey.

== Cast ==
- Harry Carey as Harry "Cheyenne Harry" Henderson
- Claire Du Brey
- T. D. Crittenden
- Fred Kelsey (credited as Fred A. Kelsey)
- Jack Leonard

== See also ==
- Harry Carey filmography
