= A Marked Man =

1917 film directed by John Ford

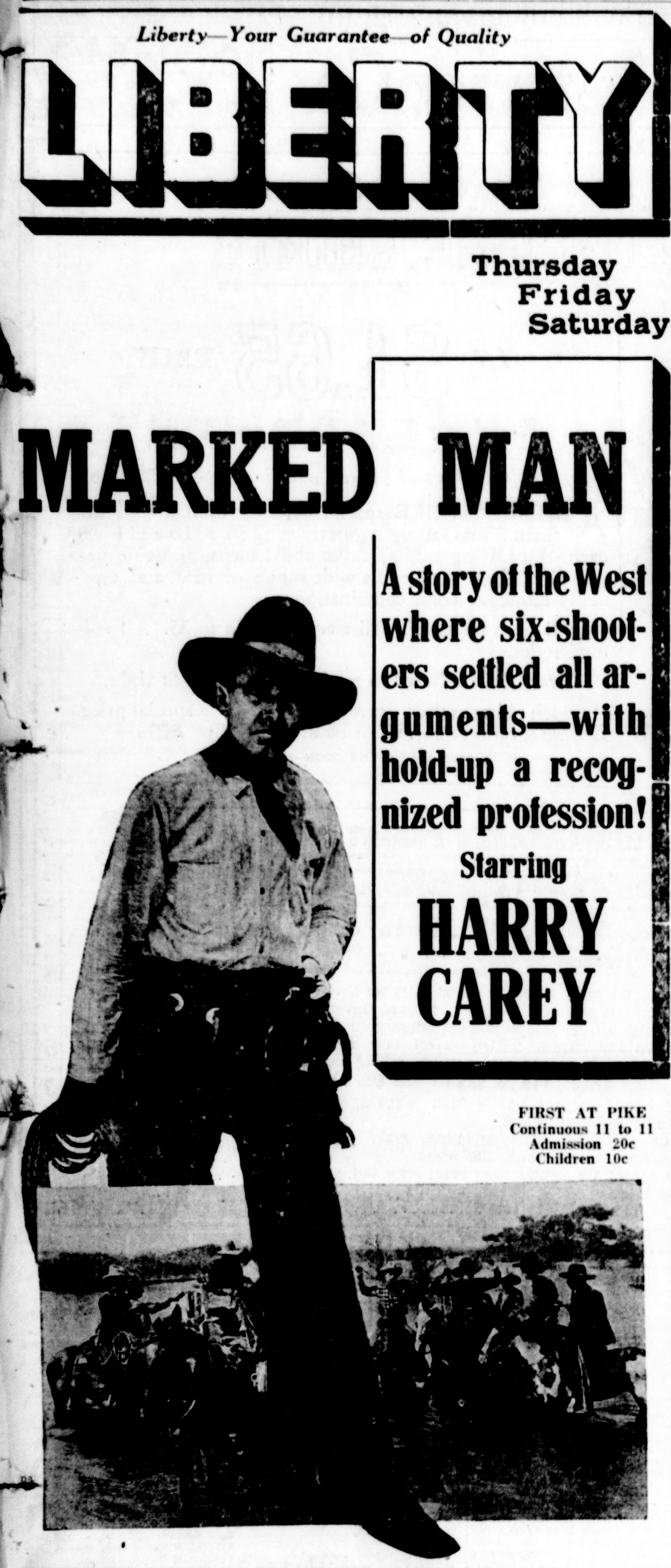
- Newspaper advertisement
- Directed by: John Ford
- Written by: John Ford (story); George Hively (scenario)
- Starring: Harry Carey
- Cinematography: John W. Brown
- Distributed by: Universal Film Manufacturing Company
- Release date: October 19, 1917
- Running time: 50 minutes
- Country: United States
- Languages: Silent; English intertitles

A Marked Man is a 1917 American silent Western film directed by John Ford and featuring Harry Carey. It is considered to be a lost film.

== Plot ==
As described in a film magazine, Cheyenne Harry (Carey), in his search for food, breaks into the home of Grant Young (Rattenberry) and his daughter Molly (Malone), who recognizes him as the man who held up the train she was traveling on but then allowed her to keep a brooch, a gift from her mother. Grant gives him a chance to make good by becoming an employee on the ranch. Harry enters a horse race contest to get enough money to visit his mother, but Ben Kent, a road agent and an old friend of Harry, cuts his stirrups. Grant forces Harry to assist in holding up a stage coach, and after Kent kills the driver of the coach, both he and Harry are arrested. A message announcing the pending arrival of Harry's mother (Townsend) results in the postponement of Harry's hanging for a couple of weeks, and Harry is allowed by the sheriff (Steele) to make use of Grant's ranch and daughter to deceive Harry's mother, as Harry had stated in his letters to her that he was an honorable man. After his mother's departure, a telegram arrives that exonerates Harry, and he rushes to see Molly.

== Cast ==
- Harry Carey as Harry "Cheyenne Harry" Henderson
- Molly Malone as Molly Young
- Harry L. Rattenberry as Grant Young (credited as Harry Rattenbury)
- Vester Pegg as Ben Kent
- Anna Townsend as Harry's Mother (credited as Mrs. Townsend)
- William Steele as Sheriff (credited as Bill Gettinger)
- Hoot Gibson as Undetermined Role

== Reception ==
Like many American films of the time, A Marked Man was subject to cuts by city and state film censorship boards. The Chicago Board of Censors required cuts of four scenes of holdup of coach in pass, first holdup scene in water, and the intertitle "Clear out of here and we will forget about the hold up".

== See also ==
- Harry Carey filmography
- Hoot Gibson filmography
- List of lost films
