= For the Love of a Girl =

1916 film

- Directed by: Harry Carey
- Written by: Harvey Gates
- Produced by: Bison Motion Pictures
- Starring: Harry Carey
- Distributed by: Universal Pictures
- Release date: July 29, 1916
- Running time: 2 reels
- Country: United States
- Languages: Silent; English intertitles

For the Love of a Girl is a 1916 American silent film featuring Harry Carey.

== Cast ==
- Harry Carey as "Black" La Rue
- Bessie Arnold
- Joe Rickson
- Olive Carey (as Olive Fuller Golden)
- Neal Hart

== See also ==
- List of American films of 1916
- Harry Carey filmography
