= Fred Kelsey =

American actor (1884–1961)

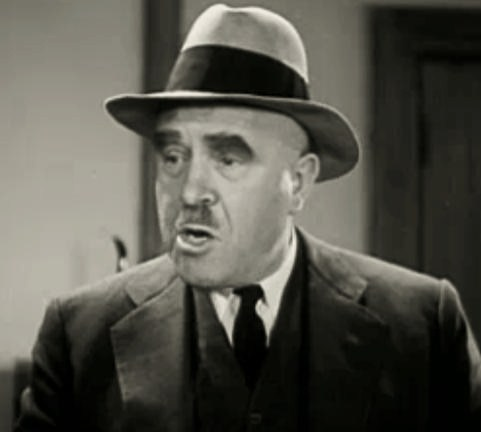
- Kelsey in Danger Ahead, 1935
- Born: Frederick Alvin Kelsey; August 20, 1884; Sandusky, Ohio, U.S.
- Died: September 2, 1961 (aged 77); Hollywood, California, U.S.
- Occupations: Actor; director; screenwriter
- Years active: 1911–1958

Frederick Alvin Kelsey (August 20, 1884 – September 2, 1961) was an American actor, film director, and screenwriter.

Kelsey directed one- and two-reel films for Universal Film Manufacturing Company. He appeared in more than 400 films between 1911 and 1958, often playing policemen or detectives. He also directed 37 films between 1914 and 1920. Kelsey was caricatured as the detective in the 1943 MGM cartoon Who Killed Who? directed by Tex Avery. He was born in Sandusky, Ohio and died at the Motion Picture Country Home in Hollywood, California, aged 77.

== Selected filmography ==
Film
Year	Film	Role	Notes
1917	Blood Money	-	Director; Credited as Fred A. Kelsey
1917	The Bad Man of Cheyenne	-	Director; Credited as Fred A. Kelsey
1917	The Outlaw and the Lady	-	Director; Credited as Fred A. Kelsey
1917	The Drifter	-	Director; Credited as Fred A. Kelsey
1917	Goin' Straight	-	Director; Credited as Fred A. Kelsey
1917	The Fighting Gringo	-	Director; Credited as Fred A. Kelsey
1917	Hair-Trigger Burke	-	Scenario; Credited as Fred A. Kelsey
1917	The Honor of an Outlaw		Director, scenario Credited as Fred A. Kelsey
1917	A 44-Calibre Mystery	-	Director; Credited as Fred A. Kelsey
1917	The Almost Good Man	-	Director; Credited as Fred A. Kelsey
1917	The Mysterious Outlaw	-	Director; Credited as Fred A. Kelsey
1917	The Golden Bullet	-	Director
1917	The Wrong Man	-	Director
1917	Six-Shooter Justice	-	Director; Credited as Fred A. Kelsey
1917	The Texas Sphinx	-	Director
1918	The Purple Lily		Director
1924	The Night Hawk	-	Director; Credited as Fred A. Kelsey
1924	The Yankee Consul	as Agent John J. Doyle	
1925	Smooth as Satin		
1926	Cruise of the Jasper B	Bailiff	Uncredited
1926	Atta Boy	Detective	
1927	Soft Cushions	The Police	
1927	The Gorilla		
1928	Ladies' Night in a Turkish Bath	Detective	
1929	Wrong Again		
1929	The Fall of Eve		
1929	The Faker		
1930	The Laurel-Hardy Murder Case	Chief of Detectives	
1930	Murder on the Roof		
1930	Men Without Law	Deputy Sheriff Jeff	
1931	Young Donovan's Kid	Collins	Alternative title: Donovan's Kid
1932	The Loud Mouth	Max, Manager of Blue Sox	
1933	Shadows of Sing Sing	Murphy	
1934	The Moth	Detective Blake	
1935	One Frightened Night	Sheriff Jenks	
1935	Horses' Collars	Detective Hyden Zeke	Three Stooges short - Uncredited
1935	School for Girls	Detective	
1937	The Jones Family in Big Business	Oil man at well	
1939	Tiny Troubles	The Judge	
1940	The Lone Wolf Strikes		
1940	The Lone Wolf Meets a Lady		
1941	Dutiful But Dumb	Vulgarian Colonel	
1941	The Lone Wolf Takes a Chance	Dickens	
1942	My Favorite Blonde	Sam - Policeman	
1942	Yankee Doodle Dandy	Irish Cop in "Peck's Bad Boy"	Uncredited
1943	A Gem of a Jam	Policeman	
1945	Micro-Phonies	Boss	Uncredited
1945	If a Body Meets a Body	Detective	
1945	San Antonio	Bartender	Uncredited
1946	Monkey Businessmen	Smiling Sam McGann	Uncredited
1946	The Strange Mr. Gregory	Detective Lefert	
1951	Havana Rose	Policeman	
1952	Hans Christian Andersen	First Gendarme	
1952	O. Henry's Full House	Mr. Schultz/Santa Claus	
1953	Pardon My Backfire	Father	Uncredited
1955	The Court-Martial of Billy Mitchell	Courtroom Extra	Uncredited
1958	Auntie Mame	Front Row Audience at Play	Uncredited
Television
Year	Title	Role	Notes
1952–1955	The Adventures of Wild Bill Hickok	Various roles	4 episodes
1958	Perry Mason	Courtroom Spectator	1 episode, uncredited
