= The Heart of a Bandit =

1915 film

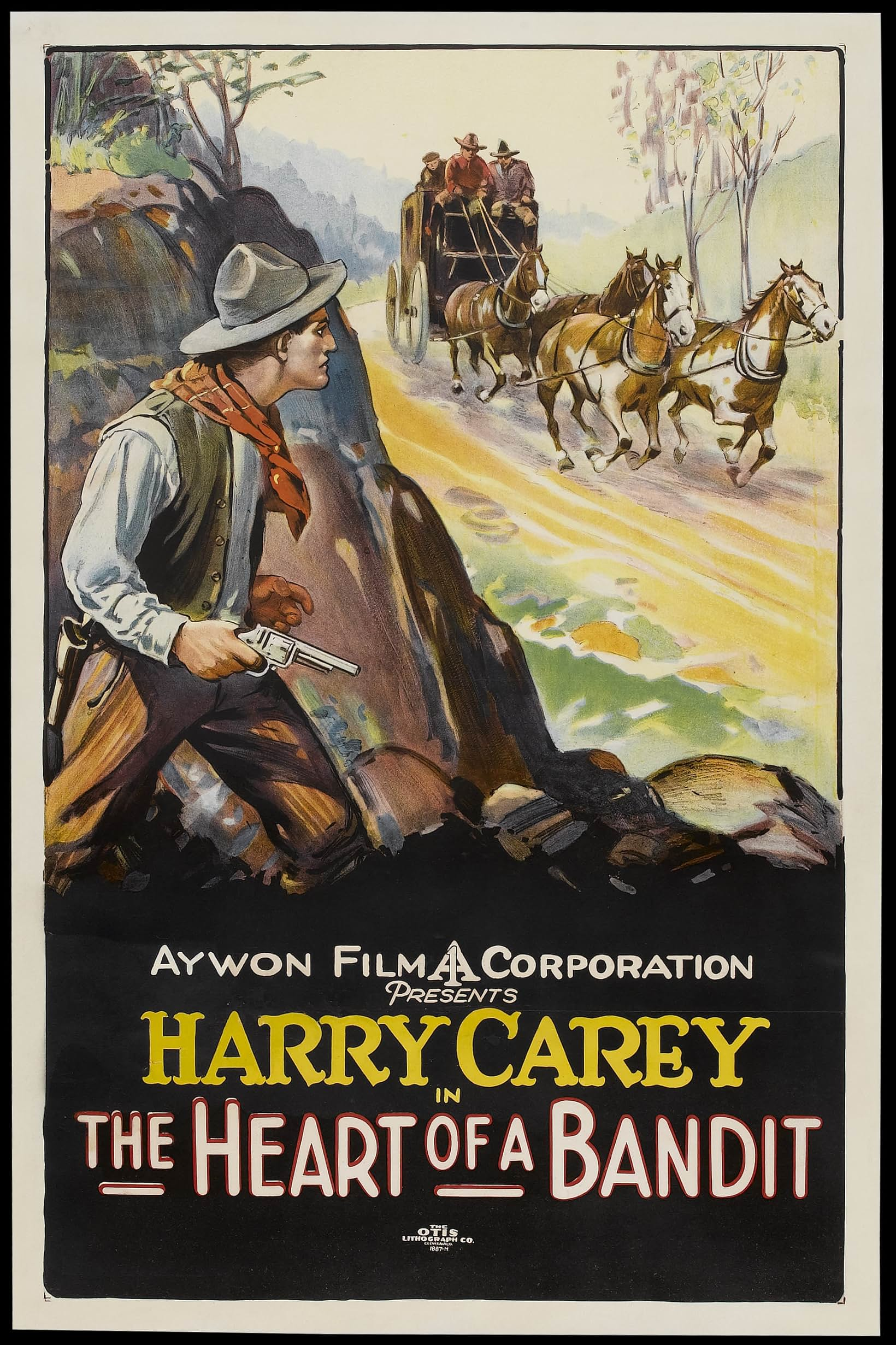
- Starring: Harry Carey
- Release date: February 22, 1915
- Country: United States
- Languages: Silent; English intertitles

The Heart of a Bandit is a 1915 American short silent Western film featuring Harry Carey. The film is preserved by the Library of Congress National Audio-Visual Conservation Center. It is the earliest surviving Western starring Carey and is one of the last films he made with Biograph before signing with Universal.

== Synopsis ==
With a price upon his head, Texas Pete takes to the open country. A halfbreed learns of the reward, trails him, and, coming upon the bandit asleep, is afraid to take him single-handed. He goes for aid, leaving behind him a copy of the advertisement by which he has recognized his man. Awaking Texas Pete finds the paper, pockets it and decamps. His horse tiring, he abandons the animal and seeks cover in a rancher's barn. The halfbreed, coming to the ranch, frightens the rancher's wife. She seizes her husband's rifle. The halfbreed snatches up her child and holding it as a shield, backs into the barn. She drops the rifle and rushes after him. Texas Pete, hidden in the hay, shoots the halfbreed. The rancher, hearing the shot and seeing his rifle on the ground, seizes it and shoots the bandit, who thus gives his life for another. Dying, be asks that the reward be paid to the child's mother.

— Moving Picture World, February 27, 1915

== Cast ==
- Harry Carey as Pete "Texas Pete", The Bandit
- Claire McDowell
- Violet Reed (credited as Violet Reid)
- Charles West (credited as Charles H. West)

== Production ==
The Heart of a Bandit was one of Carey's first Westerns after he followed D. W. Griffith's production company move to the West Coast.

The film includes an extreme long shot of the posse in pursuit. The location was found by Carey in the Santa Clarita valley. This location would be used again in several Carey Westerns.

The film promotes negative Mexican stereotypes. The character Mendoza is portrayed as a Mexican "half-breed" villain intent on raping white women. This was not unusual, as the Mexican "greaser" stereotype was common stock character in US films of the era. In films of the 1910s, the greaser was often depicted as a violent thief and the white cowboy would save the day. This ultimately led to a 1922 Mexican boycott of films that depicted Latinos in negative ways.

== Reception ==
The Wilmington, North Carolina Morning Star called it "a strange tale of a desperado with a heart" and "a thrill a second".

== Legacy ==
The film was preserved by the Library of Congress National Audio-Visual Conservation Center. It is the earliest surviving Western starring Carey and one of the last films he made with Biograph before signing with Universal. It was screened at Giornate del Cinema Muto 2023.

== See also ==
- Harry Carey filmography
