= The Abandoned Well =

1913 film

- Directed by: Oliver L. Sellers; Travers Vale
- Written by: Paul L. Feltus
- Starring: Harry Carey
- Release date: December 27, 1913
- Country: United States
- Languages: Silent; English intertitles

The Abandoned Well is a 1913 American short silent Western film featuring Harry Carey.

== Plot ==
From his hard and lonely life with his foster father, the adopted son finds solace in Cynthia, the neighbor's daughter. Father promises to give them money to start their happy married way, but forgets when a widow, with a little girl, comes home with him as a bride. The abandoned well then comes into play and father's eyes are opened to his neglect.

== Cast ==
- Harry Carey as The Adopted Son
- Claire McDowell as The Widow

== See also ==
- List of American films of 1913
- Harry Carey filmography
