= A Woman's Eyes =

1916 film

- Directed by: George Marshall
- Written by: Francis Worcester Doughty; George Marshal; W.B. Pearson
- Produced by: Universal's "Big U" unit
- Starring: Harry Carey
- Distributed by: Universal Pictures
- Release date: August 17, 1916
- Running time: 1 reel
- Country: United States
- Languages: Silent; English intertitles

A Woman's Eyes is a 1916 American silent Western film featuring Harry Carey.

== Cast ==
- Harry Carey as Tom Horn
- Olive Carey (credited as Olive Fuller Golden)
- Joe Rickson
- Doc Crane

== See also ==
- Harry Carey filmography
