= The Texas Sphinx =

1917 film

- Directed by: Fred Kelsey
- Written by: George Hively; T. Shelley Sutton
- Starring: Harry Carey
- Release date: September 15, 1917
- Running time: 20 minutes
- Country: United States
- Languages: Silent; English intertitles

The Texas Sphinx, aka A Texas Sphinx, is a 1917 American silent Western film, featuring Harry Carey and released by Universal Pictures.

== Plot ==
This plot summary was published in The Moving Picture World for September 15, 1917:

This is a two-reel Western drama with a surprise plot. Harry Carey holds up a stage. One of his victims, sworn in as deputy sheriff, tracks down his partner and puts him in Jail as a noted outlaw In disguise. Harry Carey turns out to bo a ranger, and the deputy sheriff Is the real outlaw. This picture leads up to a very strong climax.

== Cast ==
- Harry Carey
- Hoot Gibson
- Ed Jones
- Alice Lake
- William Steele (credited as William Gettinger)
- Vester Pegg

== See also ==
- Harry Carey filmography
- Hoot Gibson filmography
