= The Mysterious Outlaw =

1917 film

- Directed by: Fred Kelsey
- Written by: Karl R. Coolidge; Eugene B. Lewis
- Starring: Harry Carey
- Release date: June 11, 1917
- Country: United States
- Languages: Silent; English intertitles

The Mysterious Outlaw is a 1917 American short silent Western film featuring Harry Carey and released by Universal Pictures.

== Cast ==
- Harry Carey as Buck Lessen, The Outlaw
- William Steele as Henry Martin (credited as William Gettinger)
- Jane Bernoudy as Jane Martin
- Elizabeth Janes as Martin's Daughter

== Reception ==
Like many American films of the time, The Mysterious Outlaw was subject to cuts by city and state film censorship boards. The Chicago Board of Censors required cuts of all details of the prisoner Buck Lessen escaping from jail, including the attack on the guard, changing clothes, and the outlaw jumping from the wall, and scenes of the outlaw forcing men to exchange clothes at point of gun, the outlaw stealing a horse, and the shooting of the outlaw.

== See also ==
- Harry Carey filmography
