= Six-Shooter Justice =

1917 film

- Directed by: Fred Kelsey
- Written by: George Hively; T. Shelley Sutton
- Starring: Harry Carey
- Release date: July 17, 1917
- Country: United States
- Languages: Silent; English intertitles

Six-Shooter Justice is a 1917 American Western film featuring Harry Carey.

== Plot ==
As described in a film magazine review, John Gregg (Witting) and his daughter Mary (Du Brey) become lost and accept the guidance of Miguel Hernandez (Steele), a good-looking bad man. Mary takes a liking to the bad man and will have nothing to do with Cheyenne Harry (Carey), a bad-looking good man. Miguel robs John of his gold and takes Mary to Burro Springs. Henry follows and kills Miguel to protect Mary, and takes John's gold off the body of Miguel. Mary realizes that looks can be deceiving.

== Cast ==
- Harry Carey as Harry "Cheyenne Harry" Henderson
- Claire Du Brey as Mary Gregg, The Prospector's Daughter
- William Steele as Miguel Hernandez (credited as William Gettinger)
- A. E. Witting as John Gregg, The Prospector (credited as Arthur Witting)

== See also ==
- Harry Carey filmography
