= Hair-Trigger Burke =

1917 film

- Written by: Fred Kelsey; Eugene B. Lewis
- Starring: Harry Carey
- Release date: April 10, 1917
- Country: United States
- Languages: Silent; English intertitles

Hair-Trigger Burke is a 1917 American silent Western film starring Harry Carey.

== Cast ==
- Harry Carey as "Hair Trigger" Burke
- Ted Brooks
- Claire Du Brey
- Vester Pegg
- William Steele (credited as William Gettinger)

== See also ==
- Harry Carey filmography
