= Love's Lariat =

1916 film

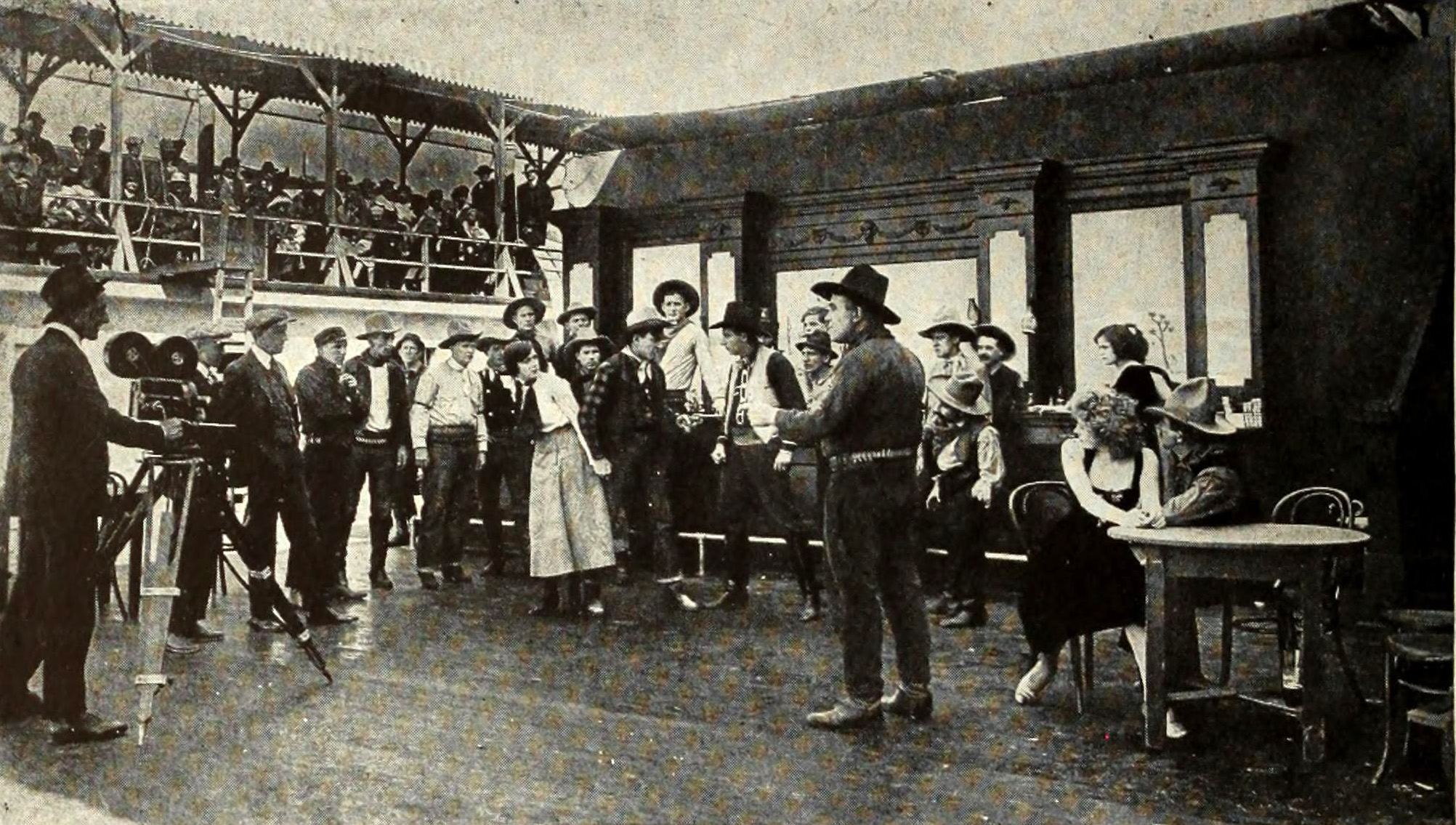
- Directed by: Harry Carey; George Marshall
- Written by: George Marshall; W.B. Pearson
- Produced by: Universal's "Bluebird Photoplays" unit
- Starring: Harry Carey
- Cinematography: Milton Moore
- Distributed by: Universal Pictures
- Release date: August 7, 1916
- Running time: 5 reels
- Country: United States
- Languages: Silent; English intertitles

Love's Lariat is a 1916 American silent film featuring Harry Carey.

== Plot ==
A cowboy called Sky High learns that he has inherited a fortune, but must move to the East to collect and keep it. The only other heir, Landers, conspires with gold-digger Goldie Le Croix to seduce and abandon Sky High, sharing his newfound wealth. The plot fails when Goldie genuinely falls for him.

== Cast ==
- Harry Carey as "Sky High"
- Neal Hart as "Skeeter"
- William Quinn as Allan Landers
- Olive Carey as Goldie Le Croix (credited as Olive Fuller Golden)
- Pedro León as Cowboy
- Joe Rickson as Cowboy
- Tom Grimes as Cowboy (credited as Tommy Grimes)
- William Gillis as Cowboy (credited as Bill Gillis)
- Bud Osborne as Cowboy

== See also ==
- Harry Carey filmography
