= The Bad Man of Cheyenne =

1917 film

- Directed by: Fred Kelsey
- Written by: Harry Carey; Fred Kelsey
- Starring: Harry Carey; Priscilla Dean
- Release date: January 13, 1917
- Running time: 20 minutes (approx.)
- Country: United States
- Languages: Silent; English intertitles

The Bad Man of Cheyenne is a 1917 two-reel American silent Western short featuring Harry Carey and Priscilla Dean. The film's survival status is unknown.

== Cast ==
- Harry Carey as Cheyenne Harry
- Priscilla Dean as The Sheriff's Wife
- Elizabeth Janes as The Sheriff's Child
- Vester Pegg as Vesta (credited as Vesta Pegg)
- Jack Richardson as Bill
- William Steele as The Sheriff (credited as William Gittenger)

== Plot ==
From the January 1917 issue of The Moving Picture World:

Sheriff Crane's wife and child are preparing for a little journey with their wagon and team. On arriving at the store, the wife, on attempting to get out, stumbles and startles the horses, which causes them to run away, the child hanging on to the wagon. This is seen by Harry, who gives chase, captures the runaway horses, and returns the child, unhurt, to the mother, she returns home to tell her husband of the bravery of the stranger. Harry stops at the saloon kept by Vesta, which is patronized by rough Bill and his gang. While there a poor old man enters accompanied by a dog. He begs for something to eat for himself and the animal, saying that the dog, will do tricks in payment. After the performance Bill abuses the dog. Bill strikes the old man and is called to account by Harry. There is a struggle and the gun explodes, killing the old man, but before dying, the latter gives his dog to Harry, begging him to care for it. Harry leaves with the dog and a threat from Bill. Later, Harry returns and there is a general fight. The gang get after Harry but escapes. Later he is shot and falls from the horse. The latter races on and crawls in the brush. The gang, misled, ride on. They meet the sheriff and tell him of the affair. Vesta is called away by one of the men. The dog enters, sneaks the bacon Vesta was cutting and takes it to Harry. Vesta cannot understand how the bacon has disappeared. The following day the same thing occurs but the dog is seen by Vesta, who shoots, wounding him in the leg. He follows and sees him take the food to Harry. He returns to the saloon and tells the gang. Harry is captured and brought to the saloon to be lynched. He is seen by the sheriff's wife. She explains to her husband that he is the man who saved their child's life. The sheriff gives Harry his horse and allows him to depart.

== See also ==
- List of American films of 1917
- Harry Carey filmography
