= Rider of the Law =

1919 film directed by John Ford

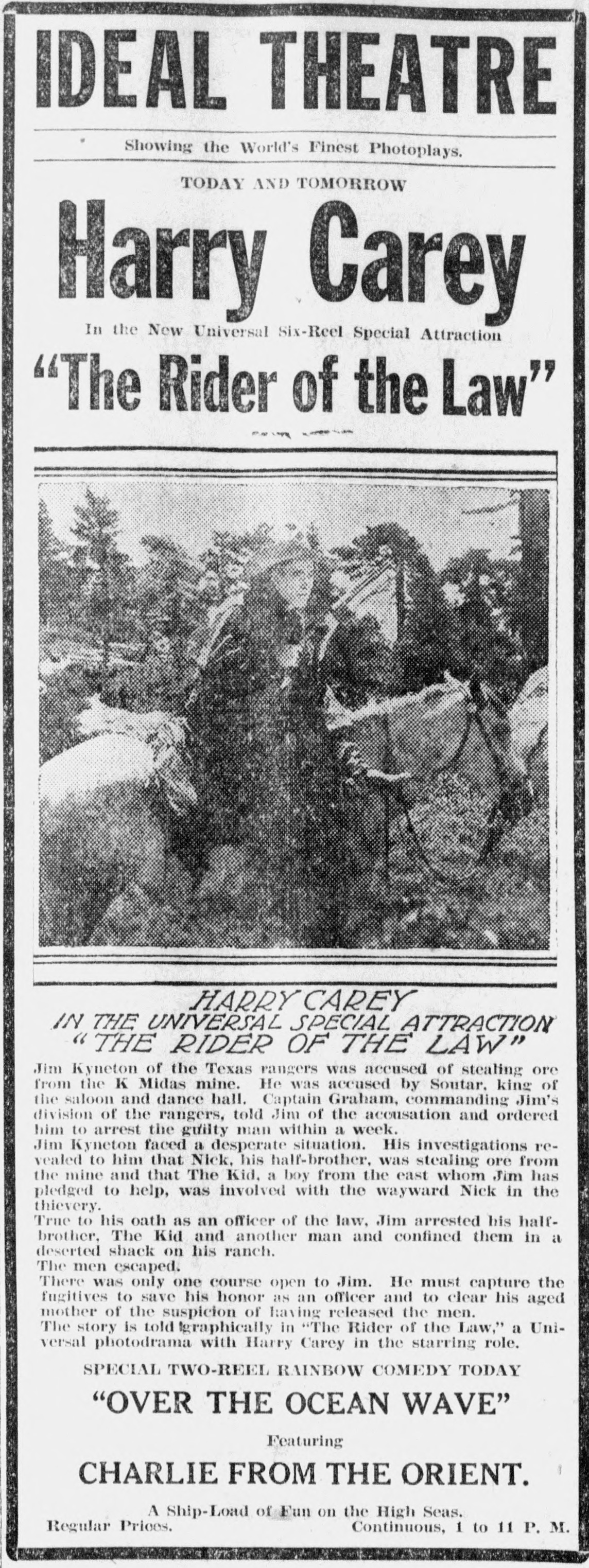
- Newspaper advertisement
- Directed by: John Ford
- Written by: G. B. Lancaster; H. Tipton Steck
- Produced by: Pat Powers
- Starring: Harry Carey
- Cinematography: John W. Brown
- Distributed by: Universal Studios
- Release date: November 3, 1919
- Running time: 60 minutes
- Country: United States
- Languages: Silent; English intertitles

Rider of the Law is a 1919 American Western film directed by John Ford and featuring Harry Carey. The film is considered to be lost.

== Cast ==
- Harry Carey as Jim Kyneton
- Vester Pegg as Nick Kyneton (credited as Vesta Pegg)
- Ted Brooks as The Kid
- Joe Harris as Buck Soutar
- Jack Woods as Jack West
- Duke R. Lee as Captain Saltire (credited as Duke Lee)
- Gloria Hope as Betty
- Claire Anderson as Roseen
- Jennie Lee as Jim's Mother

== See also ==
- Harry Carey filmography
- List of lost films
