= Wild Women (1918 film) =

1918 film directed by John Ford

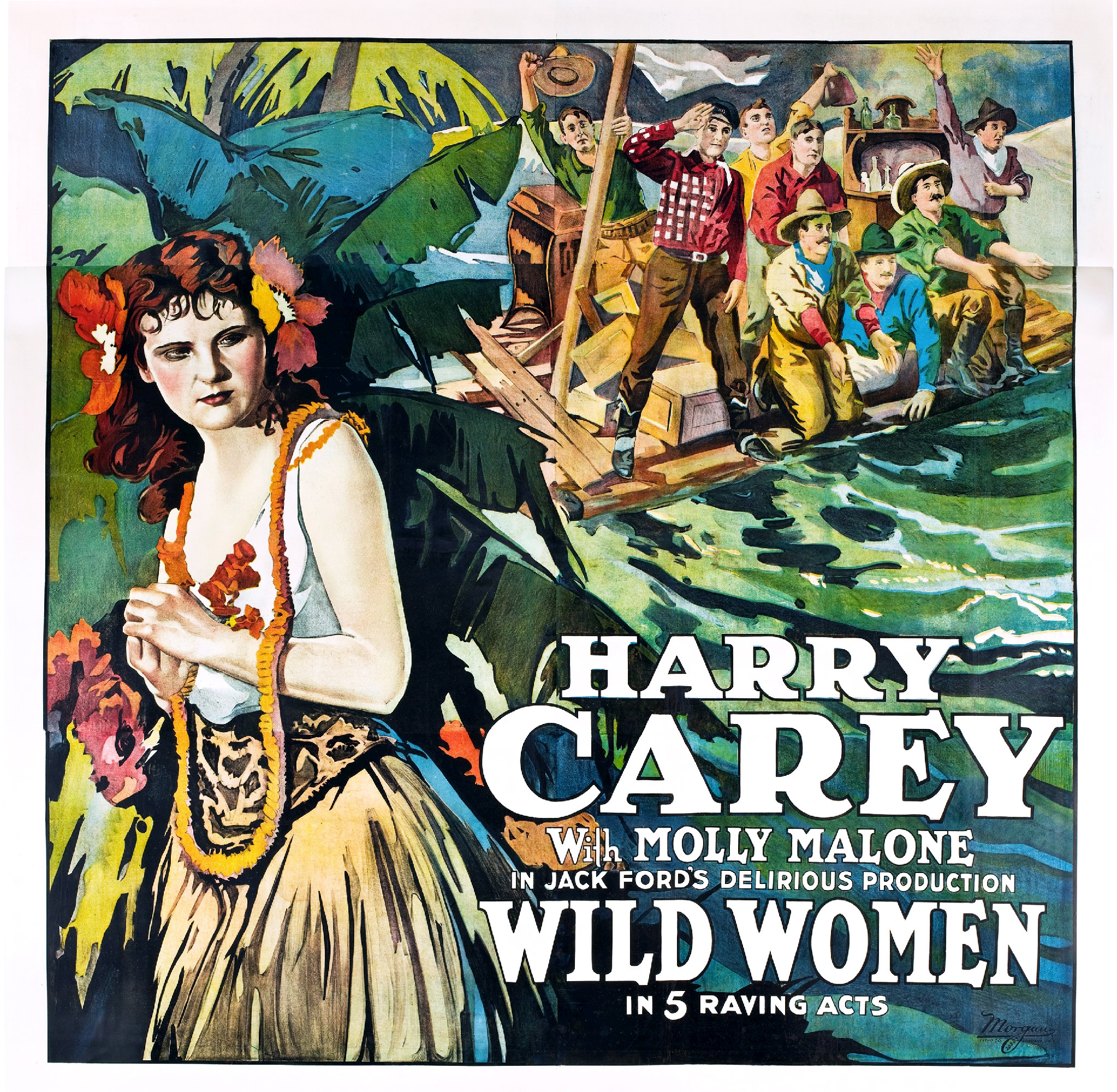
- Poster for film
- Directed by: John Ford
- Written by: Harry Carey; John Ford; George Hively
- Produced by: Harry Carey
- Starring: Harry Carey
- Cinematography: John W. Brown; Ben F. Reynolds
- Distributed by: Universal Film Manufacturing Company
- Release date: February 25, 1918
- Running time: 50 minutes
- Country: United States
- Languages: Silent; English intertitles

Wild Women is a 1918 American silent Western comedy film directed by John Ford and featuring Harry Carey. The film is considered to be lost.

== Plot ==
As described in a film magazine, Cheyenne Harry (Carey) and his pals, bent on helping their friend Rawhide Jack, attend a rodeo with the intent to win the prize for roping steers and to hand the winnings over to Jack. Harry wins, and after the rodeo the boys go to a cafe where they imbibe too freely in the flowing wine and fall asleep. Harry finds himself robbed and with the others shanghaied and aboard a ship. They mutiny and Harry becomes the captain. A shipboard fire results in them landing on a desert island, where the Queen (Mattox) of the Blackanwhites falls in love with Harry. He dodges her and runs off with her daughter the Princess (Malone). Just as he starts having sex with her, he awakens from a dream, the product of Harry's legendarily prodigious drinking, and discovers that he is holding one of the sleeping cowboys.

== Cast ==
- Harry Carey as Harry "Cheyenne Harry" Henderson
- Molly Malone as The Princess
- Martha Mattox as The Queen
- Ed Jones as Pelon (credited as Edward Jones)
- Vester Pegg as Pegg
- E. Van Beaver as The Boss
- Wilton Taylor as Joe "Slugger Joe" (credited as Wilfred Taylor)

== Production ==
Wild Women was a Universal Special release in February 1918. It was a silent film on five reels, part of the Western-themed "Cheyenne Harry" series of film featurettes.

== Reception ==
Like many American films of the time, Wild Women was subject to cuts by city and state film censorship boards. For example, the Chicago Board of Censors required cuts in Reel 2 of the three first scenes of the young woman dancing on the stage and two closeups of a young woman dancing on a table.

== See also ==
- List of lost films
