= A Knight of the Range =

1916 film

- Directed by: Jacques Jaccard
- Written by: Harry Carey (scenario)
- Starring: Harry Carey
- Distributed by: Universal Pictures
- Release date: February 7, 1916
- Running time: 50 minutes
- Country: United States
- Languages: Silent; English intertitles

A Knight of the Range is a 1916 American Western film, directed by Jacques Jaccard and starring Harry Carey.

== Cast ==
- Harry Carey as Harry "Cheyenne Harry" Henderson
- Olive Carey as Bess Dawson
- Hoot Gibson as Bob Graham
- William Canfield as Dick "Gentleman Dick"
- Bud Osborne as The Sheriff
- A. D. Blake as Nick
- William Steele as Burk (credited as Bill Gettinger)
- Peggy Coudray as Dolores

== See also ==
- Harry Carey filmography
- Hoot Gibson filmography
