= The Almost Good Man =

1917 film

- Directed by: Fred Kelsey
- Written by: Charles J. Wilson
- Starring: Harry Carey
- Release date: June 5, 1917
- Country: United States
- Languages: Silent; English intertitles

The Almost Good Man is a 1917 American silent Western film directed by Fred Kelsey, released by Universal Pictures and starring Harry Carey.

== Cast ==
- Harry Carey as Dick Glenning
- Claire Du Brey
- Albert MacQuarrie
- Frank MacQuarrie
- Vester Pegg

== See also ==
- List of American films of 1917
- Harry Carey filmography
