= The Passing of Hell's Crown =

1916 film

- Directed by: Jacques Jaccard
- Written by: W. B. Pearson
- Starring: Harry Carey
- Production company: Bison Motion Pictures
- Distributed by: Universal Film Manufacturing Company
- Release date: April 22, 1916
- Running time: 20 minutes; 2 reels
- Country: United States
- Languages: Silent; English intertitles

The Passing of Hell's Crown is a 1916 American silent Western film featuring Harry Carey.

== Cast ==
- Harry Carey as Blaze
- Olive Carey as Rose Graney (credited as Olive Fuller Golden)
- G. Raymond Nye as Chuck Wells (credited as Bill Nye)
- Neal Hart as Sheriff Bill Graney
- Hoot Gibson as The Cowboy
- Peggy Coudray as The Cowboy's Sweetheart

== Reception ==
Like many American films of the time, The Passing of Hell's Crown was subject to cuts by city and state film censorship boards. For example, the Chicago Board of Censors required a cut of the branding of cattle, seven shooting scenes between the sheriff and outlaws, and the shooting of Chuck by Blaze.

== See also ==
- Harry Carey filmography
- Hoot Gibson filmography
