= The Committee on Credentials =

1916 film

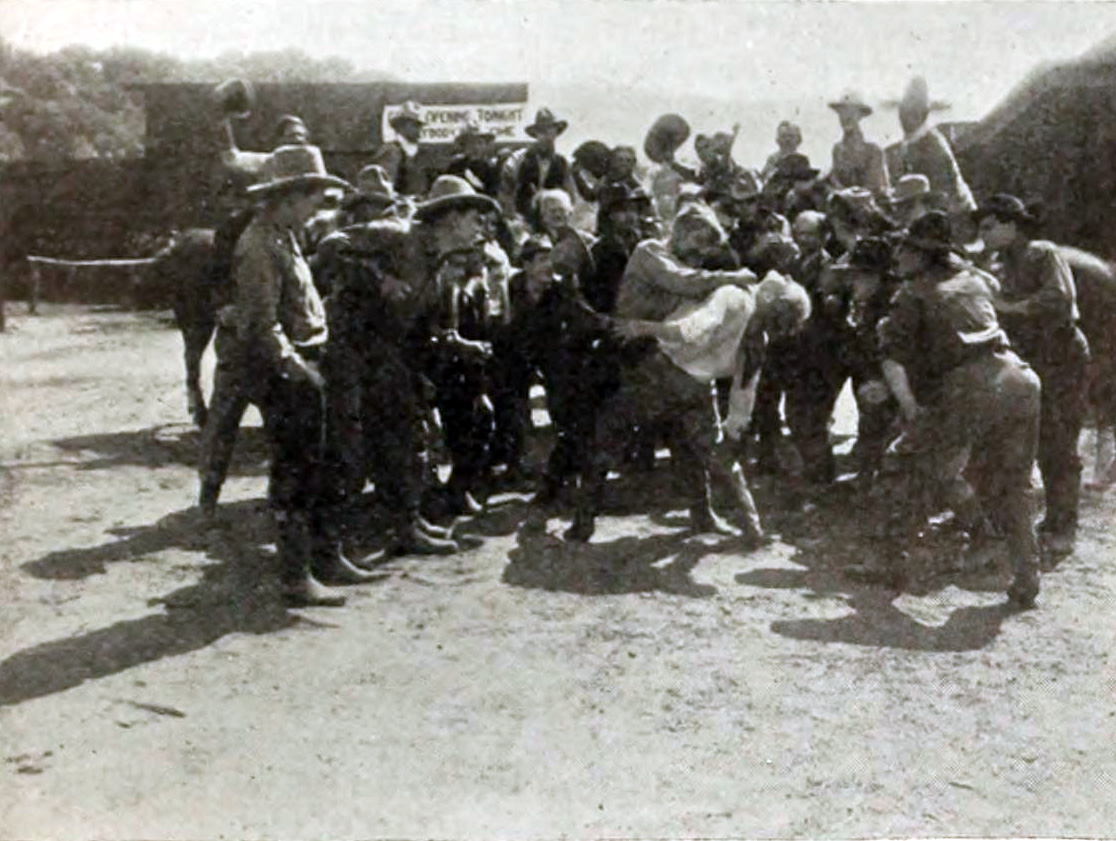
- Directed by: George Marshall
- Written by: Harvey Gates; Peter B. Kyne
- Produced by: Bison Motion Pictures
- Starring: Harry Carey
- Distributed by: Universal Pictures
- Release date: July 8, 1916
- Running time: 3 reels rereleased at 2 reels
- Country: United States
- Languages: Silent; English intertitles

The Committee on Credentials is a 1916 American silent film featuring Harry Carey. It is based on the novel The Pride of Palomar by Peter Bernard Kyne. It follows the protagonist Ballarat Bob, who tries to protect an acquaintance and squatter, Clem, from gambling away all of his money.

== Plot ==
In an attempt to protect the welfare of Clem's wife, Ballarat Bob takes Clem's savings and puts them in safe keeping with Clem's wife. This makes Clem think that his wife is having an affair; he goes on to shoot up the town and eventually ends up in a confrontation with Bob.

Kyne said of his novel, "I have at last finished writing "The Pride of Palomar." It isn't at all what I wanted it to be; it isn't at all what I planned it to be, but it does contain something of what you and I both feel, something of what you wanted me to put into it. Indeed, I shall always wish to think that it contains just a few faint little echoes of the spirit of that old California that was fast vanishing when I first disturbed the quiet of the Mission Dolores with infantile shrieks—when you first gazed upon the redwood-studded hills of Sonoma County."

Of the silent films in the early 20th century, Peter French says calls it a dramatic tale of "personal crimes, moral tales, and the place of crime in public life".

== Cast ==
- Harry Carey as Bill "Ballaret Bill"
- George Berrell
- Neal Hart
- Joe Rickson
- Olive Carey (as Olive Fuller Golden)

== See also ==
- List of American films of 1916
- Harry Carey filmography
