= Perils of the Jungle (1915 film) =

1915 film

- Directed by: E. A. Martin
- Starring: Harry Carey
- Release date: March 27, 1915
- Country: United States
- Language: Silent with English intertitles

Perils of the Jungle is a 1915 American drama film directed by E. A. Martin and starring Harry Carey.

== Cast ==
- Harry Carey
