= The Drifter (1917 film) =

1917 film

- Directed by: Fred Kelsey
- Written by: Edna Rowell Schley
- Starring: Harry Carey
- Release date: March 10, 1917
- Country: United States
- Languages: Silent; English intertitles

The Drifter is a 1917 American silent Western film released by Universal Pictures, starring Harry Carey.

== Cast ==
- Harry Carey as Harry "Cheyenne Harry" Henderson
- Claire Du Brey

== See also ==
- List of American films of 1917
