= Goin' Straight =

1917 film

- Directed by: Fred Kelsey
- Written by: Harry Carey; Fred Kelsey
- Starring: Harry Carey
- Release date: March 24, 1917
- Country: United States
- Languages: Silent; English intertitles

Goin' Straight is a 1917 American silent film featuring Harry Carey and released by Universal Pictures.

== Cast ==
- Harry Carey as Harry "Cheyenne Harry" Henderson
- Priscilla Dean as Mary Carter
- Vester Pegg as Bill "Pinnacle Bill" (credited as Vesta Pegg)
- Ted Brooks as Billy Carter
- Ed Jones as Tom "Tucson Tom"
- Charles Bryden as Wong Lee
- William Steele as Sheriff Dan Bekham (credited as William Gettinger)

== See also ==
- Harry Carey filmography
