= The Night Riders (1916 film) =

1916 film

- Directed by: Jacques Jaccard
- Written by: Jacques Jaccard
- Produced by: Bison Motion Pictures
- Starring: Harry Carey
- Distributed by: Universal Pictures
- Release date: April 1, 1916
- Running time: 20 minutes; 2 reels
- Country: United States
- Languages: Silent; English intertitles

The Night Riders is a 1916 American silent Western film, featuring Harry Carey.

== Plot ==
This plot summary comes from the original Library of Congress copyright filing:

The Apache Kid ... is very much in love with the sheriff's sister and she with him. The match is opposed, however, by the sheriff who, while content with the Apache Kid as a man among men, draws the line when it comes to the women folk.

The much feared band of outlaws known as the 'Night-Riders', ride into the little Nevada town one night and after shooting up the place ride off with one of the girls. A posse starts out to recover the girl and the Apache Kid is not with them. As he is the only man who knows the trails of the rocky, mountainous country, the sheriff's sister pleads with him to go along. He refuses, however, being angry with the sheriff for refusing to let him marry his sister. Finally, by she persuades him to go for her sake. He locates the hiding place of the gang and finds that the position is such that they could not possibly take it. The bandit leader sends down word that for five thousand dollars he will release the girl. The Apache Kid tells the men to go back and get the money, while he remains to keep watch. While they are gone he draws the main part of the outlaws away by shooting from another direction and then trails around to an entrance to the cove on the other side of the hill. In this way he gets the drop on the leader of the raiders and captures him just as the posse returns with the ransom money. [crossed out word] The sheriff is so impressed with his bravery that he willingly consents to his sister becoming his bride.

== Cast ==
- Harry Carey
- Olive Carey (credited as Olive Fuller Golden)
- Peggy Coudray
- Hoot Gibson
- Neal Hart
- Joe Rickson
