= Blood Money (1917 film) =

1917 film

- Directed by: Fred Kelsey
- Written by: Harry Carey
- Starring: Harry Carey
- Distributed by: Universal Film Manufacturing Company
- Release date: January 6, 1917
- Country: United States
- Languages: Silent; English intertitles

Blood Money is a 1917 American silent Western film directed by Fred Kelsey and starring Harry Carey.

== Cast ==
- Harry Carey
- Louise Lovely
- Vester Pegg
- Jack Richardson
- William Steele - (as William Gettinger)

== See also ==
- List of American films of 1917
