= The Wrong Man (1917 film) =

1917 silent film by Fred Kelsey

- Directed by: Fred Kelsey
- Written by: Jack Cunningham; N.P. Oakes
- Starring: Harry Carey
- Release date: July 7, 1917
- Running time: 20 minutes
- Country: United States
- Language: Silent (English intertitles)

The Wrong Man is a 1917 American silent Western film, featuring Harry Carey. Like many American films of the time, The Wrong Man was subject to cuts by city and state film censorship boards. The Chicago Board of Censors cut six holdup scenes from the film.

== Plot summary ==
In the heat of June 1891, two men make their way across the barren desert toward the edge-of-nowhere town of Guadaloop. One of them, Jack, is a young prospector chasing fortune in the sands. The other, Ben Bostwick, is a down-and-out figure known around town as a bit of a failure. At the heart of Guadaloop stands "The Silver Top" Saloon—part watering hole, part town hall—run by Larry Malone, who holds sway over just about everything that happens there. Larry’s friend, Chip Stevens, is always nearby, never far from the action.

When the stagecoach arrives, its driver steps into the saloon and, between drinks, casually mentions he's hauling a sum of money—but more importantly, he brags that a hefty $5,000 payment for the Banner Mine will be coming through next week. This piques Chip’s interest.

Around the same time, Alice Malone pays a visit to her father, Larry, right as he's reading a letter from an associate. The message is clear: if the town doesn't appoint a sheriff soon, federal marshals will come in and impose order themselves. Wanting to keep control, Larry decides to push a sheriff into office—someone harmless. Chip suggests Ben Bostwick. Larry agrees, and with a little influence from the town's power players, Ben ends up with a badge and a gun, proudly showing them off, oblivious to the fact that most folks are laughing behind his back.

Jack soon heads back out into the desert, but Ben declines to join him. Before Jack leaves, Alice, who has promised to marry him once he strikes it rich, urges him not to be gone too long.

Meanwhile, Chip and a couple of cohorts plan a robbery of the incoming Banner Mine cash. While scoping out the area, Jack happens to spot them getting ready for something suspicious and decides to investigate. The stage is attacked—two of the bandits are gunned down—and Chip manages to climb aboard, shooting the driver as he searches for the money. Jack catches up and jumps onto the moving stage. They struggle, and both end up thrown from the vehicle as the horses bolt down the road.

Chip comes to first. Seeing Jack unconscious nearby, he switches their masks, making it look like Jack was the attacker, grabs the stolen money, and takes off. He meets up with a surviving partner and heads toward safety.

Back in Guadaloop, the stagecoach limps into town with no driver and word spreads fast. Ben grabs his guns and rides out to catch the thieves. He finds Jack, still masked, lying in the dirt. Heartbroken but believing he’s captured a criminal, Ben hauls him back and locks him in the town jail.

Alice, hearing what’s happened, sneaks him a bar through the window. Jack uses it to pry his way out and rides off in pursuit of Chip. He catches up with him just as Chip is making his getaway with the gold. Ben and Alice arrive shortly after and see Jack bringing the real culprit in.

To save face and restore order, they spin the tale: the arrest was all part of a clever ruse to trick the outlaw into revealing himself. With Chip in custody, Ben escorts him back to town, while Jack and Alice linger behind, finally free to be together.

== Cast ==
- Harry Carey as Harry "Cheyenne Harry" Henderson
- Francelia Billington
- Vester Pegg
- William Steele (credited as William Gettinger)
- Hoot Gibson
- Helen Gibson
- George Berrell
