= The Golden Bullet (1917 film) =

1917 film

- Directed by: Fred Kelsey
- Written by: George Hively; T. Shelley Sutton
- Starring: Harry Carey
- Distributed by: Universal Film Manufacturing Company
- Release date: June 26, 1917
- Running time: 30 minutes
- Country: United States
- Languages: Silent; English intertitles

The Golden Bullet is a 1917 American Western film featuring Harry Carey.

== Cast ==
- Harry Carey as Jack
- Fritzi Brunette as Mattie, The Sheriff's Daughter
- Vester Pegg as Dick Henderson / "Rogue River Charlie"
- William Steele as Crazy Creek Sheriff (credited as William Gettinger)
- George Berrell as Jack's Father
- Hoot Gibson as "Red" Johnson (credited as Edward Gibson)

== Reception ==
Like many American films of the time, The Golden Bullet was subject to cuts by city and state film censorship boards. The Chicago Board of Censors required cuts of two scenes involving the theft of gold and a shooting.
