= The Fighting Gringo (1917 film) =

1917 silent western film

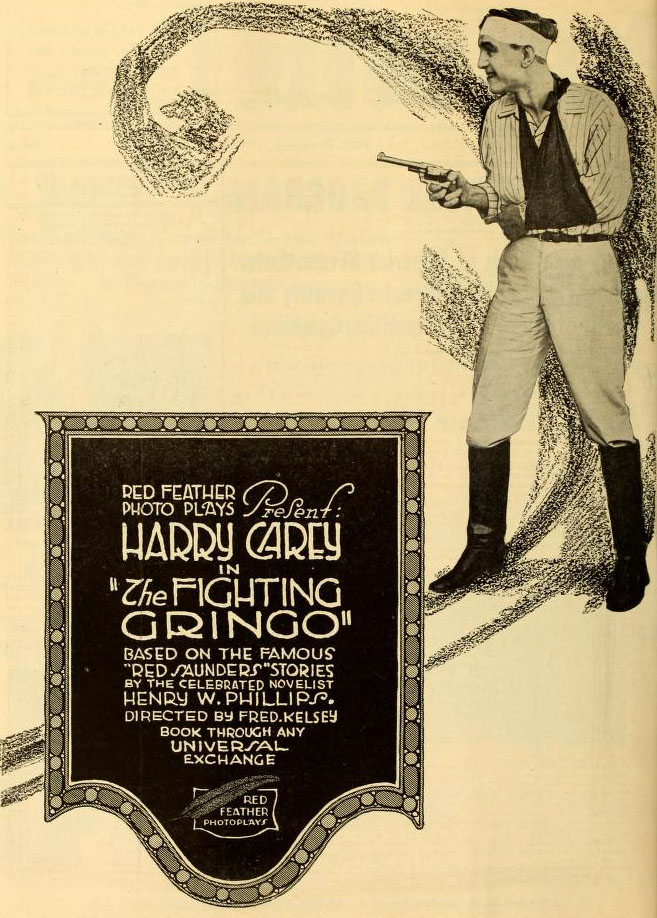
- Film poster
- Directed by: Fred Kelsey
- Written by: Maude George; Henry Wallace Phillips
- Starring: Harry Carey
- Distributed by: Universal Pictures
- Release date: March 26, 1917
- Running time: 5 reels
- Country: United States
- Languages: Silent; English intertitles

The Fighting Gringo is a 1917 American silent Western film directed by Fred Kelsey and featuring Harry Carey. The film was declared lost by the National Film Preservation Board in February 2021.

== Plot summary ==
The film follows "Red" Saunders as he attempts to reconcile the relationship between his friends, Arthur Saxon and Mary Smith, by saving Mary from the villainous missionary, Belknap. The opportunity to do so presents itself when Belknap joins with insurgents to overthrow the government. Red forms an alliance with Presidente Orinez, routs the traitorous forces, and saves the relationship of Mary and Arthur.

== Cast ==
- Harry Carey as William "Red" Saunders
- Claire Du Brey as Mary Smith
- George Webb as Arthur Saxon
- Rex De Rosselli as Ramon Orinez
- T. D. Crittenden as Belknap
- Tote Du Crow as Enrique
- William Steele as Jim (credited as Bill Gettinger)
- Vester Pegg as Pedro (credited as Vesta Pegg)

== See also ==
- List of American films of 1917
- The Fighting Gringo (1939 film)
