= Reginald Morris =

Reginald Morris may refer to:

- Reggie Morris (1886–1928), American actor and filmmaker
- Reginald H. Morris (1918–2004), British-Canadian cinematographer
