= Let's Go Native =

1930 film

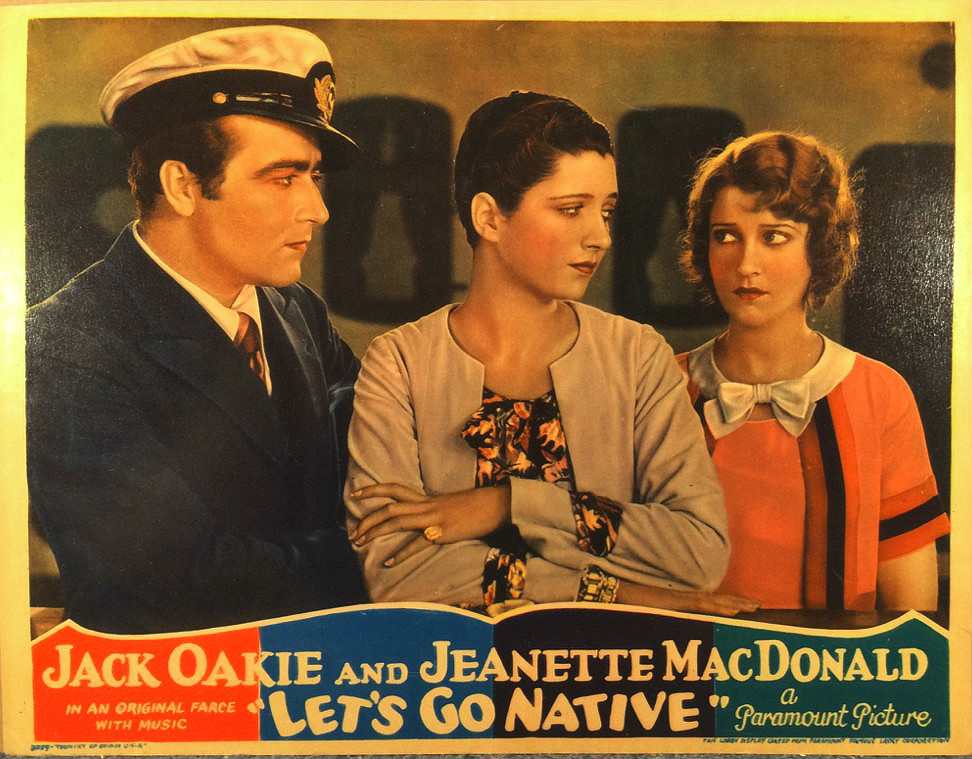
- Lobby card
- Directed by: Leo McCarey
- Written by: Percy Heath; George Marion Jr.
- Produced by: Leo McCarey
- Starring: Jack Oakie; Jeanette MacDonald; Richard "Skeets" Gallagher; James Hall
- Cinematography: Victor Milner
- Music by: George Marion Jr.; Richard A. Whiting
- Distributed by: Paramount Pictures
- Release date: August 16, 1930
- Running time: 77 minutes
- Country: United States
- Language: English

Let's Go Native is a 1930 American pre-Code black-and-white musical comedy film, directed by Leo McCarey and released by Paramount Pictures.

The well-received picture anticipated McCarey's success in future comedies, among these Part Time Wife (1930), The Kid from Spain (1932) and the screwball classic The Awful Truth (1937).

== Plot ==
The story is set in the immediate aftermath of the Panic of 1929. Joan, an unemployed costume designer and her boyfriend Voltaire, a disinherited scion of a wealthy family, embark together on a Caribbean cruise. Voltaire discovers that his childhood sweetheart, Constance, is a passenger on the ship: romantic complications develop.

The three find themselves shipwrecked on a tropical island. They discover that the paradise is populated by women, with only one male inhabitant, Jerry. Dubbed King of the Island, he quips “"It was one of the Virgin Islands, but it drifted." Further romantic complications ensue. When these are finally resolved, Voltaire's grandfather arrives on a yacht and rescues the castaways. As they depart, the island sinks into the ocean.

== Cast ==
- Jack Oakie – Voltaire McGinnis
- Jeanette MacDonald – Joan Wood
- Richard "Skeets" Gallagher – Jerry, King of the Island
- James Hall – Wally Wendell
- William Austin – Basil Pistol
- Kay Francis – Constance Cook
- David Newell – Chief Officer Williams
- Charles Sellon – Wallace Wendell Sr.
- Eugene Pallette – Deputy Sheriff 'Careful' Cuthbert
- Iris Adrian – Chorus Girl
- Virginia Bruce – Chorus Girl

== Release ==
Paramount initially delayed release of Let's Go Native, concerned that the theme was too bizarre for audiences and “had not expected it to be quite so free-spirited.”

Let’s Go Native opened simultaneously with the Marx Brothers’ Animal Crackers (1930) and was “favorably compared by period critics with this pioneering zany team classic” directed by Victor Heerman.

The film was released on 16 August 1930 but a preview screening had taken place in April or May the same year.

== Retrospective appraisal ==
Film historian Wes D. Gehring identifies Let’s Go Native as a precursor to McCarey's subsequent screwball comedy classic The Awful Truth (1937). Let's Go Native not only catapulted the careers of Jack Oakie, Jeanette MacDonald and Kay Fransis, but “helped established McCarey as a viable feature film director.” The Marx Brothers-like elements of the film earned McCarey the honor of directing Duck Soup (1933).

Film historian Richard Barrios in his A Song in the Dark: The Birth of the Musical Film writes: “Let’s Go Native was sheer [joyful] malarkey, played with bounce and directed by McCarey with some of the affinity toward musical anarchy he later brought to Duck Soup.”

== Soundtrack ==
- "It Seems To Be Spring"

Lyrics by George Marion Jr.
Music by Richard A. Whiting
Copyright 1930 by Famous Music Corp.

- "Let's Go Native"

Lyrics by George Marion Jr.
Music by Richard A. Whiting
Copyright 1930 by Famous Music Corp.

- "My Mad Moment"

Lyrics by George Marion Jr.
Music by Richard A. Whiting
Copyright 1930 by Famous Music Corp.

- "I've Gotta Yen For You"

Lyrics by George Marion Jr.
Music by Richard A. Whiting
Copyright 1930 by Famous Music Corp.
Sung by Jack Oakie

- "Joe Jazz"

Lyrics by George Marion Jr.
Music by Richard A. Whiting
Copyright 1930 by Famous Music Corp.
Sung by Jack Oakie

- "Pampa Rose"

Lyrics by George Marion Jr.
Music by Richard A. Whiting
Copyright 1930 by Famous Music Corp.

- "Don't I Do?"

Lyrics by George Marion Jr.
Music by Richard A. Whiting
Copyright 1930 by Famous Music Corp.

== Sources ==
- Barrios, Richard. 1995. A Song in the Dark: The Birth of the Musical Film. Oxford University Press, New York. ISBN 978-0195377347
- Gehring, Wes D. 2005. Leo McCarey: From Marx to McCarthy. The Scarecrow Press, Lantham, Maryland, Toronto, Oxford. ISBN 0-8108-5263-2
- Hooper, Gary and Poague, Leland. 1980. Leo McCarey Filmography in The Hollywood Professionals: Wilder and McCarey, Volume 7. The Tanvity Press, A. S. Barnes and Company, Inc, San Diego, California. pp. 295–314. ISBN 0498-02181-5
