= Iris Stuart =

American actress

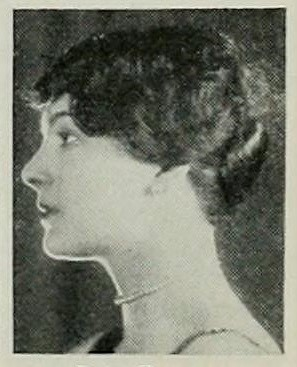
- Stuart in 1927
- Born: Frances McCann; February 2, 1903; Brooklyn, New York City, New York, U.S.
- Died: December 21, 1936 (aged 33); New York City, New York, U.S.
- Occupation: Actress
- Years active: 1926–1927
- Spouse: Bert A. Mackinnon (m. 1928)

Iris Stuart (born Frances McCann; February 2, 1903 – December 21, 1936) was a motion picture actress of the silent film era. Selected as a WAMPAS Baby Star of 1927, she had a brief career between 1926 and 1927 before retiring from acting. She died of tuberculosis in 1936.

== Early life ==
Born as Frances McCann, she attended secretarial school before becoming a magazine cover girl who was much favored by artists. Her picture was used as a model for a jewelry advertisement.

== Career ==
She was signed by Paramount Pictures associate producer B.P. Schulberg to a long-term contract with Famous Players in July 1926. She was first cast in a Bebe Daniels film entitled Stranded in Paris (1926). She played "Theresa Halstead", the films' second lead. She obtained the role quite by accident. Director Arthur Rosson asked to view a screen test of another actress and the projection operator mixed up the reels. Rosson quickly decided on Stuart for the part. The story was adapted from a play called Jenny's Escapade.

In January 1927 she was selected with twelve other young actresses as a WAMPAS Baby Star of 1927. Some of the other women named were Sally Phipps, Natalie Kingston, Sally Rand, and Helene Costello.

== Illness and later career ==
Stuart suffered from tuberculosis, and her health declined so rapidly that physicians advised her to admit herself to a southern California sanitarium in February 1927. Her constitution was fragile and was weakened further by work and nervous strain.

She returned to films in December 1927 against the wishes of her family. Stuart signed a new contract with Paramount-Famous-Lasky Corporation in January 1928. Her first role in her comeback was not immediately decided upon. The following month she secretly wed wealthy New York magazine publisher, Bert A. Mackinnon, in Las Vegas, Nevada. She took out a marriage license using her true name, Iris McCann. The couple postponed plans for a honeymoon and resided temporarily at the Ambassador Hotel in Los Angeles.

== Death ==
Stuart died in New York City in 1936, aged 33, of tuberculosis. She is interred at the Gate of Heaven Cemetery in Hawthorne, New York.

== Filmography ==
Key
†	Denotes a lost or presumed lost film.

Year	Title	Role	Notes	Ref.
1926	Stranded in Paris †	Theresa Halstead		
1927	Casey at the Bat	Trixie		
1927	Children of Divorce	Mousie		
1927	Wedding Bills	Miss Markham		

== Works cited ==
- Los Angeles Times, Magazine Cover Girl Busy, September 17, 1926, Page A8.
- Los Angeles Times, New Baby Stars Stud Film Firmament, January 7, 1927, Page A1.
- Los Angeles Times, Illness May Bar Path To Stardom, February 24, 1927, Page A1.
- Los Angeles Times, Baby Star Returns To Film City, December 3, 1927, Page A1.
- Los Angeles Times, Iris Stuart, Bride of Magazine Publisher, January 4, 1928, Page A15.
- Los Angeles Times, Iris Stuart Signs Contract, January 17, 1928, Page A10.
- Port Arthur News, Hollywood, Sunday, January 1, 1928, Page 16.
