= Viola Brothers Shore =

American author (1890–1970)

- Born: May 26, 1890; New York City, New York, United States
- Died: March 27, 1970 (aged 79); New York City, New York, United States
- Occupations: Author; screenwriter; playwright; poet
- Years active: 1919–39

Viola Brothers Shore (May 26, 1890 – March 27, 1970) was an American author who worked in a variety of mediums from the 1910s through the 1930s.

She began her writing career as a poet and a writer of short stories and articles or magazines. Toward the end of the silent film era, she began writing screenplays, and eventually expanded into theatrical plays and novels. Her daughter, Wilma Shore, was also a successful writer.

Shore was named during the hearings of the House Committee on Un-American Activities, along with her third husband, Haskoll Gleichman, and her daughter. In her later years she taught at New York University.

== Early life ==
Born on May 26, 1890, Shore was the oldest of three children of Abram Brothers and Minnie Epstein Brothers. Her father was a noted surgeon, as well as being an actor, writer and violinist. Her mother was a descendant of the first kosher butcher in New York City, and, according to family tradition, was born after her pregnant mother escaped from New Orleans in a canoe paddled by local Indians. The escape was prompted after Minnie's father killed a man who had attacked his wife and fled pursuit, making his way to New York City. Shore's younger siblings were Madeleine Brothers and Arthur J. Brothers.

Shore attended public schools and Hunter College (then named Normal College), before leaving school in 1906 to pursue a musical career. When her father became ill, she was forced to work at a number of different jobs, including working at an office and at an electrical consulting business. The electrical business was one she started with her first husband, William Shore, whom she married in 1912. She gave birth to a daughter, Wilma, on October 12, 1913. In the 1910s, Shore went back to school, this time at NYU.

== Career ==
While at NYU, she began her writing career, publishing poetry, articles, and short stories in magazines. In 1921, she would publish her first short story collection, The Heritage, and other stories.

She expanded into the film industry in 1925 when one of her short stories, "On the Shelf", which had been published in the Saturday Evening Post in 1922, was made into a film called Let Women Alone. She had another one of her short stories, "The Prince of Headwaiters", (co-written with Garrett Fort) made into a film of the same name in 1927, before working on her first screen writing credit in 1927, when she wrote the titles (dialogue) for Night Life, a silent film directed by George Archainbaud.

Shore worked on another dozen screenplays for silent films over the next two years, as well as having another one of her short stories, "Notices", turned into a screenplay for the film Hit of the Show in 1928. Shore worked on the scripts for another fourteen screenplays for sound films from 1929 through 1939, the first one being Dangerous Curves in 1929, starring Clara Bow and Richard Arlen.

Other notable films on which Shore worked on the script include 1933's comedy Sailor Be Good, which she co-wrote with Ethel Doherty and Ralph Spence, and starring Jack Oakie; Breakfast for Two, a 1937 screwball comedy starring Barbara Stanwyck and Herbert Marshall, which she co-wrote with Charles Kaufman and Paul Yawitz; and Blond Cheat (1938), another comedy also co-authored with Kaufman and Yawitz, as well as Harry Segall. Shore's final screenplay was an adaptation of the Barry Benefield novel, The Chicken-Wagon Family for the 1939 film Chicken Wagon Family, which stars Jane Withers.

In the 1930s, Shore also wrote several mystery novels, including The Beauty Mask Murder in 1930 and Murder on the Glass Floor two years later. During this time she would also be involved in several Broadway productions. Shore, along with Nancy Hamilton and June Sillman, wrote the lyrics to the 1934 musical revue, New Faces of 1934, which ran for almost 150 performances at the Fulton Theatre, and had a cast which included Henry Fonda and Imogene Coca.

Later that year, on Christmas Day, she would have two plays open simultaneously on Broadway. Her drama, Piper Paid, written with Sarah B. Smith, opened at the Ritz Theatre, and the musical Fools Rush In opened at the Playhouse Theatre. Both plays had very short runs of 15 and 14 performances, respectively.

=== Filmography ===
(Per AFI database)

- Let Women Alone (1925)
- The Prince of Headwaiters (1927)
- Night Life (1927)
- The Haunted Ship (1927)
- Streets of Shanghai (1927)
- The House of Scandal (1928)
- The Devil's Skipper (1928)
- Green Grass Widows (1928)
- Nameless Men (1928)
- The Port of Missing Girls (1928)
- The Scarlet Dove (1928)
- The Shield of Honor (1928)
- Their Hour (1928)
- Lucky Boy (1929)
- Broadway Fever (1929)
- Dangerous Curves (1929)
- The Kibitzer (1930)
- Husband's Holiday (1931)
- No Limit (1931)
- Men Are Such Fools (1932)
- Sailor Be Good (1933)
- Smartest Girl in Town (1936)
- Walking on Air (1936)
- Breakfast for Two (1937)
- The Life of the Party (1937)
- Blond Cheat (1938)
- The Arkansas Traveler (1938)
- Chicken Wagon Family (1939)

== Later life ==
Shore divorced from her first husband, William, in 1926. At some point, she married a print dealer, Henry Braxton, whom she also divorced in 1933. She married her third husband, Haskoll Gleichman, in 1939, but this marriage also ended in divorce in 1945. In 1947, Shore, her daughter, and Gleichman were all named during hearings in front of the House Committee on Un-American Activities. By the mid-1950s, she had moved back to New York City and became a teacher at NYU. She died on March 29, 1970, in New York City at the age of 79.
