= Stranded in Paris =

1926 film by Arthur Rosson

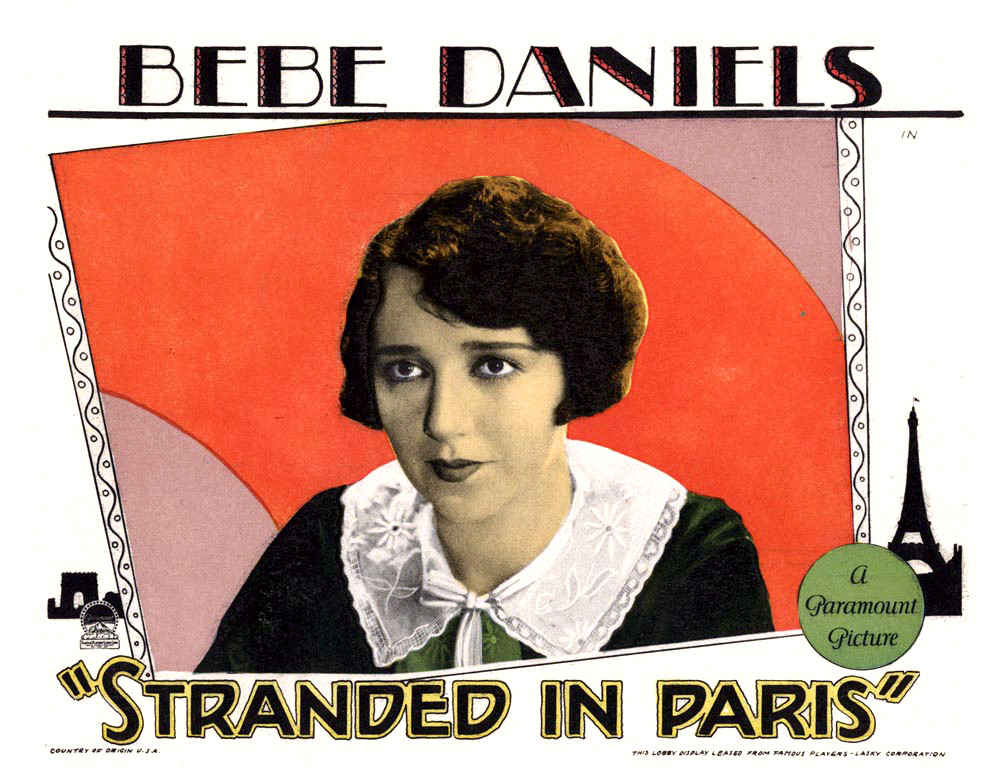
- Lobby card
- Directed by: Arthur Rosson
- Written by: Ethel Doherty; Louise Long; Herman J. Mankiewicz (adaptation); George Marion, Jr. (titles); John McDermott (adaptation)
- Based on: Jenny's Escapade by Hans Backwitz and Fritz Jakobstetter
- Starring: Bebe Daniels
- Cinematography: William Marshall
- Distributed by: Paramount Pictures
- Release date: December 13, 1926
- Running time: 70 minutes
- Country: United States
- Language: Silent (English intertitles)

Stranded in Paris is a 1926 American silent comedy film starring Bebe Daniels and directed by Arthur Rosson. The film was produced by Famous Players–Lasky and distributed by Paramount Pictures.

== Cast ==
- Bebe Daniels as Julie McFadden
- James Hall as Robert Van Wye
- Ford Sterling as Count Pasada
- Iris Stuart as Theresa Halstead
- Mabel Julienne Scott as Countess Pasada
- Tom Ricketts as Herr Rederson
- Helen Dunbar as Mrs. Van Wye
- Ida Darling as Mrs. Halstead
- George Grandee as Pettipan
- Andre Lanoy as Schwab

== Preservation ==
With no prints of Stranded in Paris located in any film archives, it is a lost film.
