= Louise Long =

American screenwriter

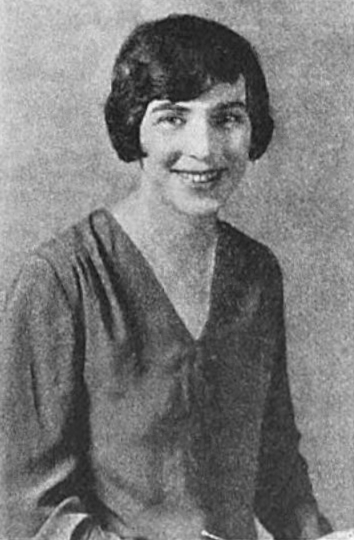
- Born: October 15, 1886; Central City, Nebraska, US
- Died: July 14, 1966 (aged 79); Vista, California, US
- Occupations: Screenwriter, editor, educator, author

Louise Long (October 15, 1886 – July 14, 1966) was an American screenwriter, educator, author, and film editor active primarily in the 1920s and 1930s.

== Biography ==
Long, a native of Central City, Nebraska, was the daughter of Noah Long and Lois Palmer. She moved to California with her family when she was in high school. She went on to attend the University of Southern California, where she met her friend and future collaborator Ethel Doherty.

After college, Long and Doherty worked at L.A. public schools, but they'd dedicate their evenings to writing screenplays. Frustrated with their lack of success at selling their stories, they taught themselves shorthand and stenography and got jobs at Paramount (then Famous Players–Lasky). At night, they'd spend their time learning how to edit films.

They eventually worked their way into editing roles at Paramount, making $15 a week, before moving into screenwriting at $450 a week. Long's first big break into screenwriting was with 1926's The Campus Flirt, followed by Stranded in Paris that same year.

Long and Doherty worked steadily in film through the late 1930s before deciding to turn their interests to writing magazines and novels (including 1938's The Seeds of Time). The two continued to live and work together in Laguna Beach.

Long died in Vista, California, on July 14, 1966.

== Selected filmography ==
- The Campus Flirt (1926) (scenario)
- Stranded in Paris (1926)
- The World at Her Feet (1926)
- Figures Don't Lie (1927)
- Man Power (1927)
- Rough House Rosie (1927) (scenario)
- Interference (1928)
- Love and Learn (1928)
- Sawdust Paradise (1928) (adaptation)
- Three Weekends (1928)
- What a Night! (1928)
- Fashions in Love (1929)
- The Greene Murder Case (1929)
- Woman Trap (1929)
- The Virtuous Sin (1930) (scenario)
- The Rebel (1931)
- Zoo in Budapest (1933)
