= The Arkansas Traveler (film) =

1938 film by Alfred Santell

- Theatrical release poster
- Directed by: Alfred Santell
- Screenplay by: Viola Brothers Shore; George Sessions Perry
- Story by: Jack Cunningham
- Produced by: George M. Arthur
- Starring: Bob Burns; Fay Bainter; John Beal; Jean Parker; Lyle Talbot; Irvin S. Cobb
- Cinematography: Leo Tover
- Edited by: Paul Weatherwax
- Music by: Gerard Carbonara
- Production company: Paramount Pictures
- Distributed by: Paramount Pictures
- Release date: October 14, 1938
- Running time: 85 minutes
- Country: United States
- Language: English

The Arkansas Traveler is a 1938 American comedy film directed by Alfred Santell and written by Viola Brothers Shore and George Sessions Perry. The film stars Bob Burns, Fay Bainter, John Beal, Jean Parker, Lyle Talbot and Irvin S. Cobb. The film was released on October 14, 1938, by Paramount Pictures.

== Plot ==
The Arkansas Traveler, an itinerant printer, returns to a small town to help save a newspaper started by his friend who has died.

== Cast ==
- Bob Burns as The Arkansas Traveler
- Fay Bainter as Mrs. Martha Allen
- John Beal as John 'Johnnie' Daniels
- Jean Parker as Judy Allen
- Lyle Talbot as Matt Collins
- Irvin S. Cobb as Town Constable
- Dickie Moore as Benjamin Franklin 'Benny' Allen
- Porter Hall as Mayor Daniels
