= Men Are Such Fools (1932 film) =

1932 film

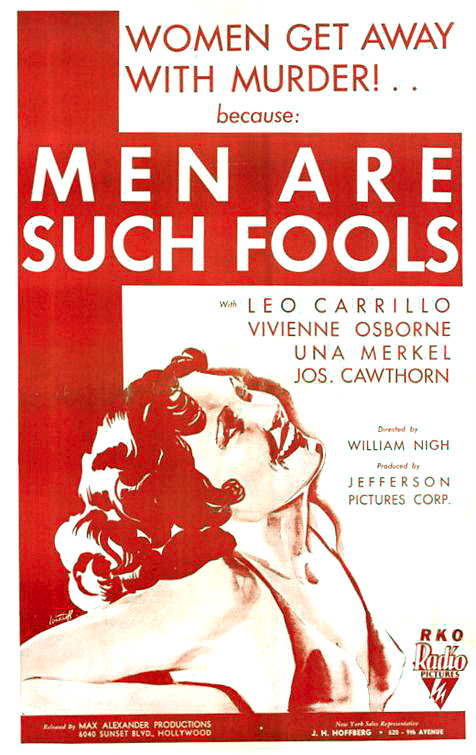
- Theatrical release poster
- Directed by: William Nigh
- Screenplay by: Viola Brothers Shore; Ethel Doherty
- Story by: Thomas Lennon
- Produced by: Joseph I. Schnitzer; Samuel Zierler
- Starring: Leo Carrillo; Vivienne Osborne; Una Merkel; Joseph Cawthorn; Tom Moore
- Cinematography: Charles Edgar Schoenbaum
- Edited by: Viola Lawrence
- Music by: W. Franke Harling
- Production company: RKO Pictures
- Distributed by: RKO Pictures
- Release date: November 18, 1932
- Running time: 64 minutes
- Country: United States
- Language: English

Men Are Such Fools is a 1932 American pre-Code drama film directed by William Nigh and written by Viola Brothers Shore and Ethel Doherty. The film stars Leo Carrillo, Vivienne Osborne, Una Merkel, Joseph Cawthorn and Tom Moore. It film was released on November 11, 1932 by RKO Pictures.

== Cast ==
- Leo Carrillo as Tony Mello
- Vivienne Osborne as Lilli Arno
- Una Merkel as Molly
- Joseph Cawthorn as Werner
- Tom Moore as Tom Hyland
- Earle Foxe as Joe Darrow
- J. Farrell MacDonald as Prison Warden Randolph
- Paul Hurst as Stiles
- Albert Conti as Spinelli
- Paul Porcasi as Klepak
- Edward Nugent as Eddie Martin
- Lester Lee as Giuseppe
