= The Pirate of Panama =

1929 film

- Directed by: Ray Taylor
- Written by: Arthur Henry Gooden; George Morgan; William MacLeod Raine
- Starring: Jay Wilsey; Natalie Kingston
- Distributed by: Universal Pictures
- Release date: July 8, 1929
- Running time: 12 episodes
- Country: United States
- Language: Silent with English intertitles

The Pirate of Panama is a 1929 American action film serial directed by Ray Taylor. The film is considered to be lost.

== Cast ==
- Jay Wilsey (aka Buffalo Bill Jr.) as Karl
- Natalie Kingston as Evelyn Wallace
- Al Ferguson as Boris Bothwell
- George Ovey as Evelyn's brother
- Mary Sutton as Aunt Berry
- Otto Bibber as Teager

== Episodes ==
The serial had a total of 12 episodes, with the first 3 being released on the same day, and the others being slowly released for the next few months.

1. Pirate Gold
2. Mutiny
3. The Treasure Chest
4. The Pirates' Secret
5. Vengeance
6. Trapped by the Tide
7. The Shadow of Death
8. The Menacing Swamp
9. The Signal of Hope
10. Two Lives for One
11. The Price of Greed
12. The Greatest Treasure

== See also ==
- List of film serials
- List of film serials by studio
