= Tom and His Pals =

1926 film

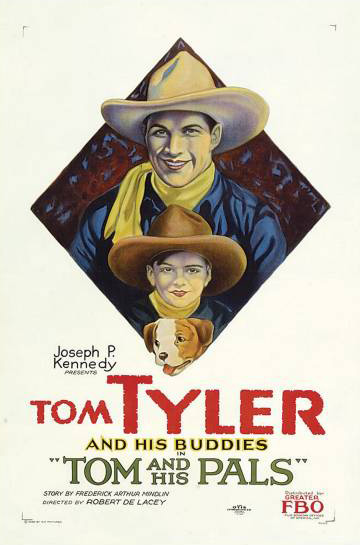
- Poster
- Directed by: Robert De Lacey
- Written by: Frederick Arthur Mindlin; F.A.E. Pine
- Produced by: Joseph P. Kennedy
- Starring: Tom Tyler; Doris Hill; Frankie Darro
- Cinematography: John W. Leezer; Gilbert Warrenton
- Production company: Robertson-Cole Pictures Corporation
- Distributed by: Film Booking Offices of America; Ideal Films (UK)
- Release date: September 7, 1926
- Running time: 54 minutes
- Country: United States
- Language: Silent (English intertitles)

Tom and His Pals is a 1926 American silent Western film directed by Robert De Lacey and starring Tom Tyler, Doris Hill and Frankie Darro. It was released in Britain under the alternative title of Movie Struck.

A film company comes to shoot their latest movie on a ranch.

== Cast ==
- Tom Tyler as Tom Duffy
- Doris Hill as Mary Smith
- Frankie Darro as Frankie Smith
- Dick Brandon as Junior Carroll
- LeRoy Mason as Courtney
- Helen Lynch as Pandora Golden
