= Wet Paint (1926 film) =

1926 film by Arthur Rosson

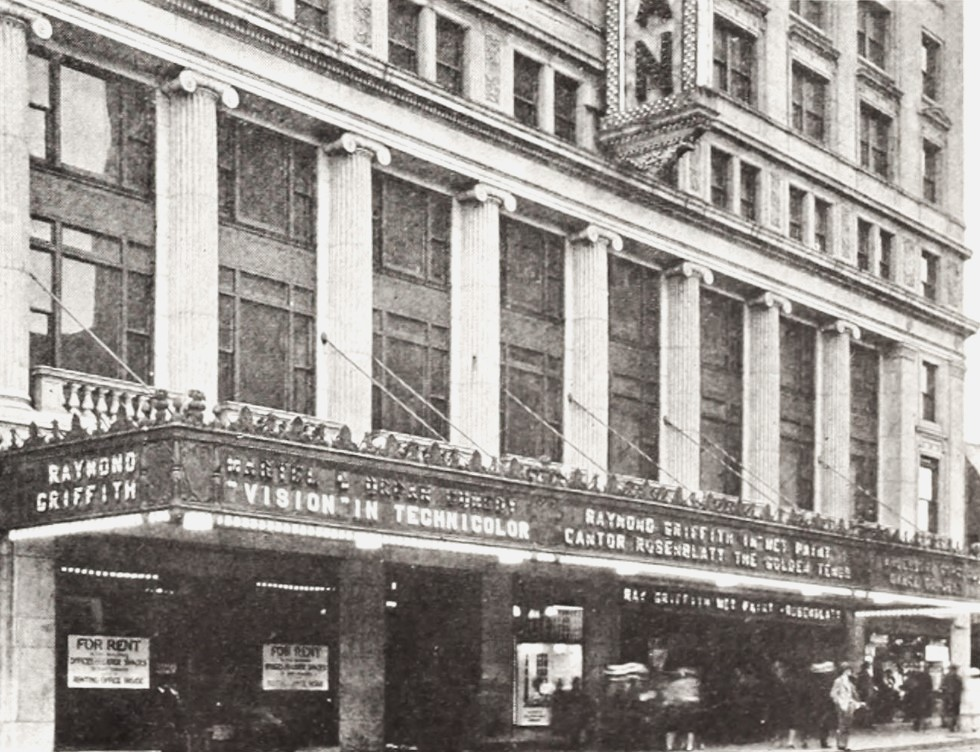
- Boston theater showing the film
- Directed by: Arthur Rosson
- Screenplay by: Lloyd Corrigan; Reggie Morris
- Produced by: Jesse L. Lasky; Adolph Zukor
- Starring: Raymond Griffith; Helene Costello; Bryant Washburn; Natalie Kingston; Henry Kolker
- Cinematography: William Marshall
- Production company: Famous Players–Lasky Corporation
- Distributed by: Paramount Pictures
- Release date: May 3, 1926
- Running time: 60 minutes
- Country: United States
- Language: Silent (English intertitles)

Wet Paint is a lost 1926 American silent comedy film directed by Arthur Rosson and starring Raymond Griffith, Helene Costello, Bryant Washburn, Natalie Kingston, and Henry Kolker. Written by Lloyd Corrigan and Reggie Morris, the film was released on May 3, 1926, by Paramount Pictures.

== Plot ==
As described in a film magazine review, a wealthy bachelor proposes to the woman he loves and discovers that she had made a bet that he would do so. He then decides to marry the first young woman he meets. Many exciting incidents and mishaps occur, including meeting an escaped lion and trying to catch a driverless automobile, before he and the woman he loves are reunited for a wedding.

== Cast ==
- Raymond Griffith as He
- Helene Costello as She
- Bryant Washburn as Her Brother
- Natalie Kingston as A Beautiful Woman
- Henry Kolker as A Husband

== Preservation ==
With no prints of Wet Paint located in any film archives, it is a lost film.
