= Avalanche (1928 film) =

1928 film

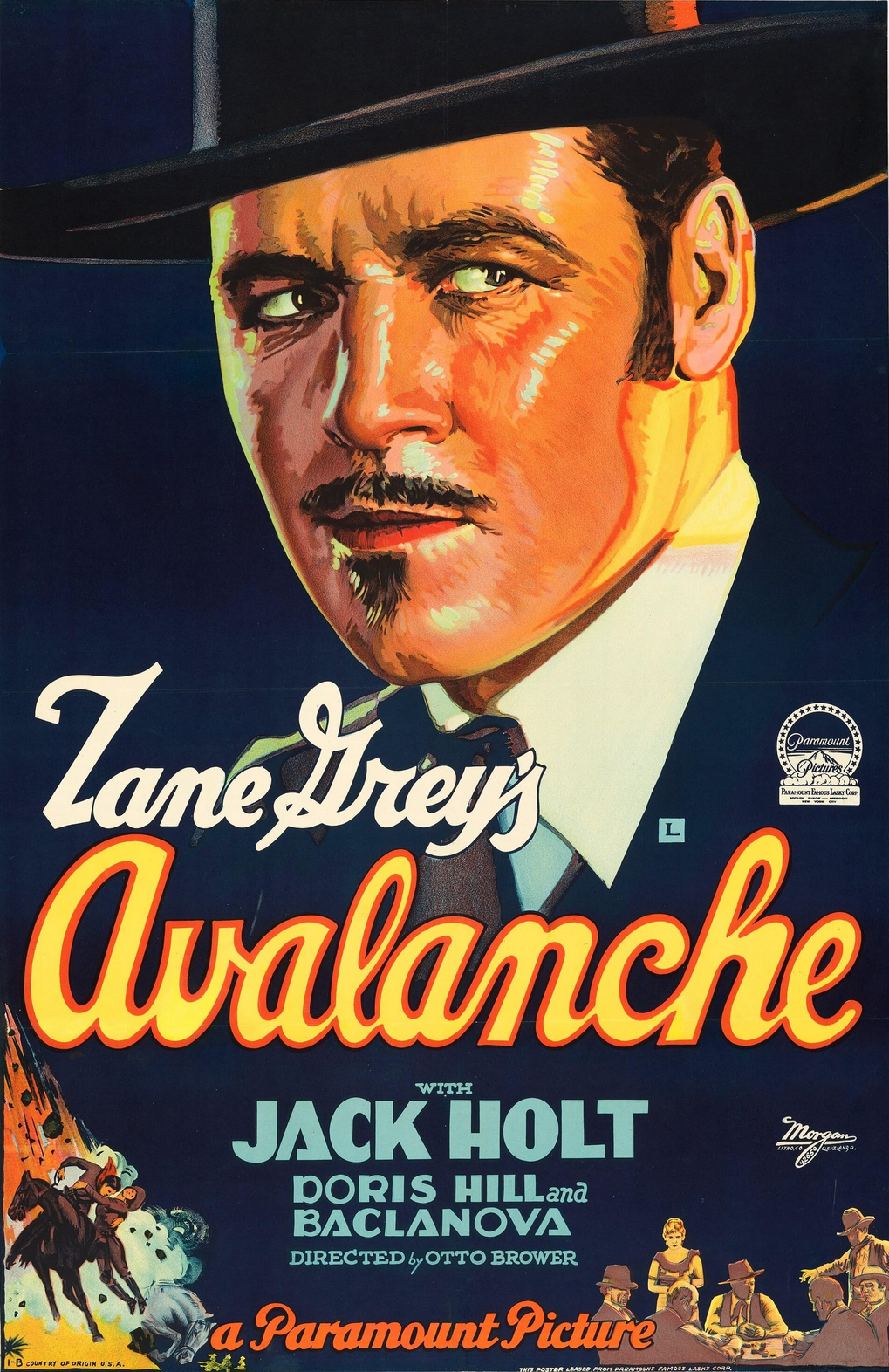
- Directed by: Otto Brower
- Written by: Zane Grey (novel); Herman J. Mankiewicz (screenplay)
- Produced by: Paramount Famous Lasky
- Starring: Jack Holt, Doris Hill, and Olga Baclanova
- Cinematography: Roy Clark
- Edited by: Jane Loring
- Distributed by: Paramount Pictures
- Release date: November 12, 1928
- Running time: 6 reels; 6,099 feet
- Country: United States of America
- Languages: Silent; English intertitles

Avalanche is a lost 1928 American silent Western film, directed by Otto Brower. It stars Jack Holt, Doris Hill, and Olga Baclanova. It was produced and distributed through the Paramount Pictures company.

== Cast ==
- Jack Holt - Jack Dunton
- Doris Hill - Kitty Mains
- Olga Baclanova - Grace Stillwell (* billed as Baclanova)
- John Darrow - Verde
- Guy Oliver - Mr. Mains
- Dick Winslow - Jack Dunton, age 12

== Preservation ==
With no holdings located in archives, Avalanche is considered a lost film.
