= What a Night! (1928 film) =

1928 film by A. Edward Sutherland

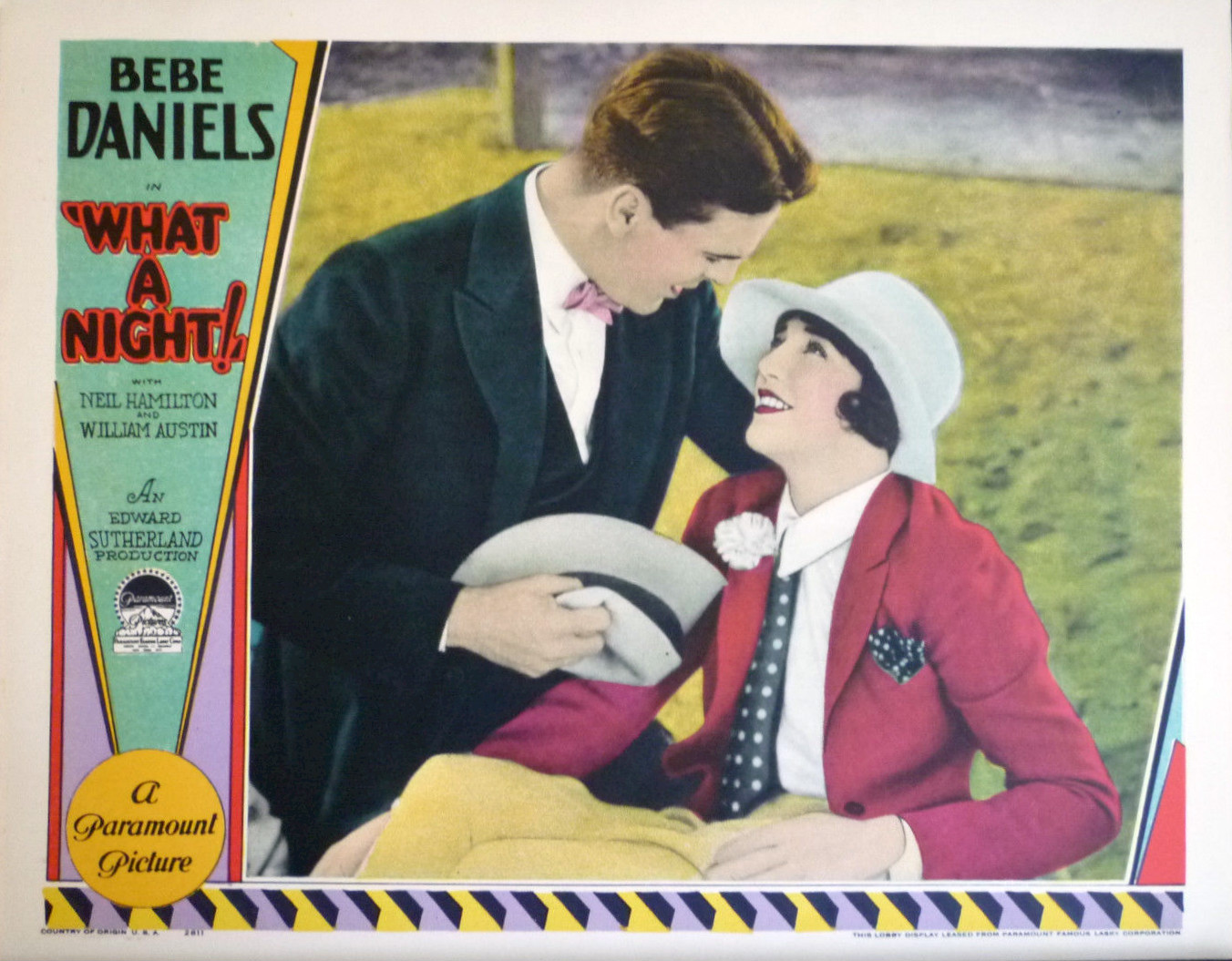
- Lobby card
- Directed by: A. Edward Sutherland
- Written by: Louise Long; Herman J. Mankiewicz (intertitles)
- Story by: Lloyd Corrigan; Grover Jones
- Produced by: Adolph Zukor; Jesse L. Lasky
- Starring: Bebe Daniels; Neil Hamilton; William Austin; Wheeler Oakman; Charles Sellon; Charles Hill Mailes; Ernie Adams
- Cinematography: Edward Cronjager
- Edited by: Doris Drought
- Production company: Paramount Pictures
- Distributed by: Paramount Pictures
- Release date: December 22, 1928
- Running time: 60 minutes
- Country: United States
- Language: Silent (English intertitles)

What a Night! is a lost 1928 American silent romantic comedy film directed by A. Edward Sutherland. The romantic comedy was written by Louise Long, from a story by Lloyd Corrigan and Grover Jones. The film stars Bebe Daniels, Neil Hamilton, and William Austin.

== Plot ==
Daniels, in her final silent film, plays Dorothy Winston, an heiress who sets out to become a newspaper reporter. When she breaks a big story, she finds herself in peril.

== Cast ==
- Bebe Daniels as Dorothy Winston
- Neil Hamilton as Joe Madison
- William Austin as Percy Penfield
- Wheeler Oakman as Mike Corney
- Charles Sellon as Editor Madison
- Charles Hill Mailes as Patterson
- Ernie Adams as Snarky

== Preservation status ==
With no holdings located in archives, What a Night! is considered a lost film.
