= The Silent Lover =

1926 film

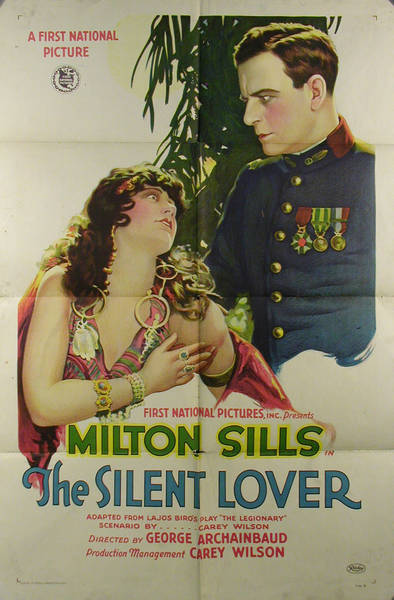
- Directed by: George Archainbaud
- Written by: Carey Wilson
- Starring: Milton Sills; Natalie Kingston; Viola Dana
- Production company: First National Pictures
- Distributed by: First National Pictures
- Release date: November 21, 1926
- Running time: 70 minutes
- Country: United States
- Languages: Silent; English intertitles

The Silent Lover is a 1926 American silent adventure film directed by George Archainbaud and starring Milton Sills, Natalie Kingston and Viola Dana. A print exists in the National Film and Television Archive of the BFI National Archive.

== Cast ==
- Milton Sills as Count Pierre Tornal
- Natalie Kingston as Vera Sherman
- William Humphrey as Cornelius Sherman
- Arthur Edmund Carewe as Captain Herault
- William V. Mong as Kobol
- Viola Dana as Scadsza
- Claude King as Contarini
- Charles Murray as O'Reilly
- Arthur Stone as Greenbaum
- Alma Bennett as Haldee
- Montagu Love as Ben Achmed

== Bibliography ==
- Munden, Kenneth White. The American Film Institute Catalog of Motion Pictures Produced in the United States, Part 1. University of California Press, 1997.
