= The Good Bad Girl =

1931 film

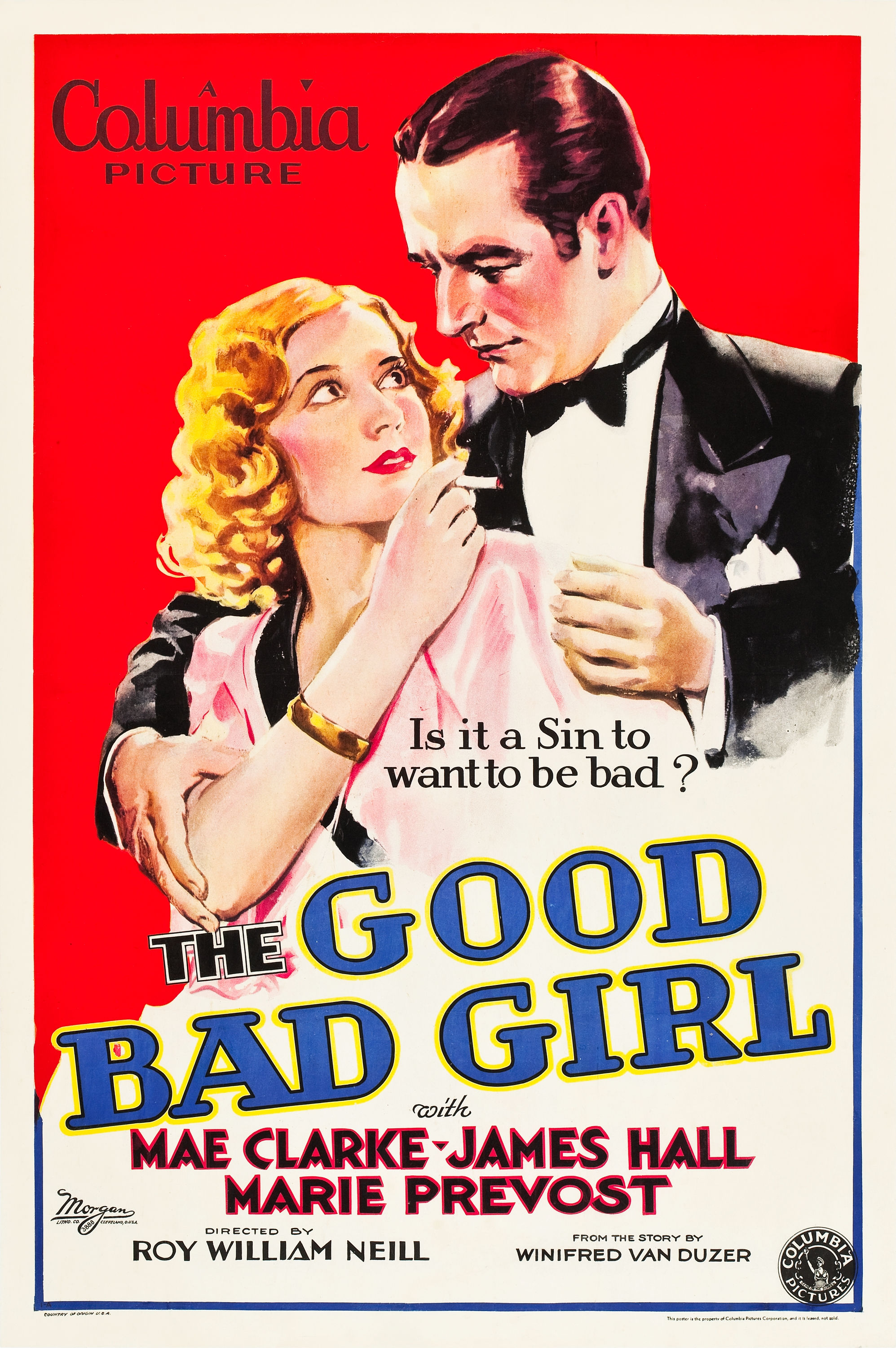
- Directed by: Roy William Neill
- Written by: Jo Swerling (dialogue)
- Story by: Winifred Van Duzer
- Produced by: Harry Cohn
- Starring: Mae Clarke; James Hall; Marie Prevost
- Cinematography: Ted Tetzlaff
- Edited by: Edward Curtiss
- Production company: Columbia Pictures
- Distributed by: Columbia Pictures
- Release date: May 20, 1931
- Running time: 71 minutes
- Country: United States
- Language: English

The Good Bad Girl is a 1931 American romance film based on a novel by Winifred Van Duzer.

== Cast ==
- Mae Clarke as Marcia Cameron
- James Hall as Bob Henderson
- Marie Prevost as Trixie Barnes
- Robert Ellis as Dapper Dan Tyler
- Nance O'Neil as Mrs. J.P. Henderson
- James Donlan as Police Sgt. Donovan
- Paul Porcasi as Tony Pagano
- Wheeler Oakman as Moreland
