= Blond Cheat =

1938 film by Joseph Santley

- Film poster
- Directed by: Joseph Santley
- Written by: Aladar Laszlo
- Screenplay by: Harry Segall; Charles Kaufman; Paul Yawitz; Viola Brothers Shore
- Produced by: William Sistrom
- Starring: Joan Fontaine; Derrick De Marney; Cecil Kellaway; Cecil Cunningham; Lilian Bond; Robert Coote; Olaf Hytten
- Cinematography: J. Roy Hunt
- Edited by: Jack Hively
- Music by: Harold Adamson; Burton Lane; Roy Webb
- Production company: RKO Radio Pictures
- Distributed by: RKO Radio Pictures
- Release date: June 17, 1938
- Running time: 62 minutes
- Country: United States
- Language: English

Blond Cheat (also known as The Muddled Deal) is a 1938 American romantic comedy film directed by Joseph Santley and starring Joan Fontaine, Derrick De Marney, and Cecil Kellaway. The film was produced by William Sistrom, and originally released by RKO Radio Pictures. The original story is by Aladar Lazlo. The screenplay is by Harry Segall, Charles Kaufman, Paul Yawitz, and Viola Brothers Shore. The tagline for the movie was: "A happy blend of blackmail, robbery, treachery, and love!"

== Plot ==
Michael Ashburn is the chief assistant to Rufus Trent, a wealthy London loan broker. Michael is socially prominent, but works for a living. He is engaged to Trent's daughter, Roberta. The match had been engineered primarily by the socially-ambitious Mrs. Trent.

As Michael is closing the shop late one afternoon, a man named Douglas takes out a large loan, using earrings worn by his niece, Julie, as a deposit. He scurries right off with the money but, to his dismay, Michael finds that the earrings are fastened to Julie's ears and cannot be removed. He now has to keep guard of her until Douglas returns with the money.

Julie wants to go somewhere warm for the night. He hails a policeman to have her put in a jail cell so that she's kept somewhere safe, but when the cop arrives, she tricks him into arresting Michael instead. She manages to swipe Michael's house key and spends the night at his house.

The next morning, the butler finds Julie in Michael's bed. Michael arrives home with a cold after his night in jail. He doesn't realize that Julie's at his house. When Roberta arrives, angry, he calms her down, until she discovers Julie in Michael's pajamas and in his bedroom. Roberta breaks off her engagement to Michael.

Julie slips away in the confusion and arrives at a theatrical agency. Her "uncle" runs the agency and she quickly removes the earrings as he praises her night's work. In reality, Julie is an actress and, with her successful work breaking the engagement between Michael and Roberta, is offered a leading role in a new production.

Roberta arrives at home and tells her parents that the engagement is off. Trent is thrilled. It is revealed at this time that Trent hired Douglas's agency to break the engagement. At work Michael is being called to the carpet by Trent for loaning money without collateral when Mrs. Trent arrives and fixes everything so that Roberta and Michael are engaged again. Trent, upset that the wedding is still on, goes back to Douglas and tells him he won't pay until the engagement is broken for good.

Gilbert, Trent's assistant, dislikes Michael. He works with Julie by bringing in a box for Michael at work. Inside are Michael's pajamas. Roberta is there when the box arrives and she isn't happy to see the contents. Michael hurries her off when he sees Julie inside the shop vault. Michael takes Julie to her hotel room and stays with her when she pretends to be sick after her night outside.

He arrives late for dinner with Roberta and her friends. When she questions him, he admits to being with Julie, but he reassures her that Julie is very sick in bed. At that instant Julie shows up looking glamorous. Fed up, Roberta leaves, but Michael insists on staying because he has to keep an eye on the earrings.

Alone with Michael, Julie confesses that she was trying to break up his engagement on purpose that night because she didn't think he should be married simply because he comes from a prominent family. As they share a cozy ride in a carriage, Michael makes overtures to having feelings for Julie. She tries to explain about the earrings when they are held up by robbers. They want the earrings. Michael explains that they cannot be removed, but one of the robbers threatens to cut Julie's ears off to get to them. She takes the earrings off easily and gives them to the robbers.

Furious, Michael admits to being a fool. He leaves her.

Trent doesn't want to pay Douglas, so he gets a note at dinner asking Trent to meet Douglas in Julie's dressing room. Mrs. Trent follows Trent, demanding an explanation. Since Trent had finally paid up, Douglas lies and says that he had a scheme to break up Michael and Roberta's engagement, but that Trent paid him off.

The truth comes out accidentally when Julie refuses to continue with the plan. The police arrive when Michael recognizes one of the robbers – the one who threatened to cut off Julie's ears – as a waiter at the club. The waiter tells the police that Roberta paid him to rob Julie and Michael.

He breaks into Julie's show and tells her he loves her.

== Cast ==
- Joan Fontaine as Juliette 'Julie' Evans
- Derrick De Marney as Michael 'Mike' Ashburn
- Cecil Kellaway as Rufus Trent
- Cecil Cunningham as Genevieve 'Gennie' Trent
- Lilian Bond as Roberta Trent
- Robert Coote as Gilbert Potts
- Olaf Hytten as Paul Douglas
- John Sutton as Fred Percy
- Gerald Hamer as Piccadilly Club eaiter
