= Wedding Bills =

1927 film

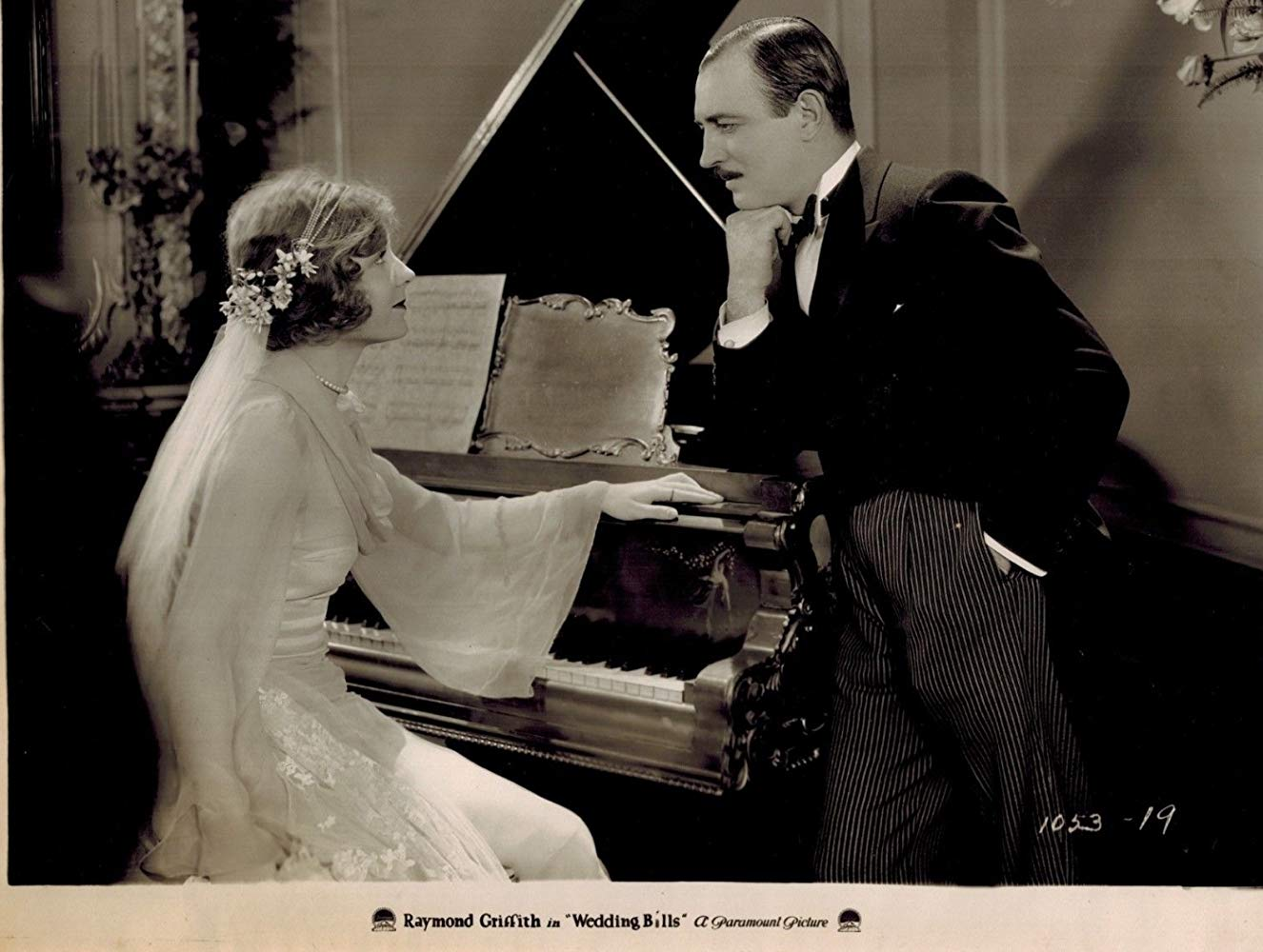
- Lobby card
- Directed by: Erle C. Kenton
- Written by: Lloyd Corrigan; Grover Jones; George Marion Jr.; Keene Thompson
- Produced by: B.P. Schulberg
- Starring: Raymond Griffith; Anne Sheridan; Hallam Cooley
- Cinematography: William Marshall
- Production company: Paramount Pictures
- Distributed by: Paramount Pictures
- Release date: May 7, 1927
- Running time: 60 minutes; 5,869 feet (1,789 m)
- Country: United States
- Languages: Silent; English intertitles

Wedding Bills (also sometimes written as Wedding Bill$) is a 1927 American silent comedy film directed by Erle C. Kenton and starring Raymond Griffith, Anne Sheridan, and Hallam Cooley.

It is considered lost.

== Cast ==
- Raymond Griffith as Algernon Schuyler Van Twidder
- Anne Sheridan as Miss Bruce
- Hallam Cooley as Tom Milbank
- Iris Stuart as Miss Markham
- Vivien Oakland as Mademoiselle Mimi de Lyle
- Tom Guise as Mr. Markham
- Louis Stern as Judson, valet
- Edgar Kennedy as Detective
- John Steppling as District Attorney
- Vera Reynolds

== Bibliography ==
- Donald W. McCaffrey & Christopher P. Jacob. Guide to the Silent Years of American Cinema. Greenwood Publishing Group, 1999. ISBN 0-313-30345-2
