= The Detective's Stratagem =

1913 film

- Written by: John J.A. Gibney
- Starring: Reggie Morris
- Release date: November 20, 1913
- Country: United States
- Language: Silent with English intertitles

The Detective's Stratagem is a 1913 American drama film featuring Harry Carey.

== Cast ==
- Reggie Morris as The Bank Clerk
- Claire McDowell as Kate, The Bank Clerk's Sweetheart
- Harry Carey as Keene, The Detective
- Charles West as First Plotter (credited as Charles H. West)
- Joseph McDermott as Second Plotter
- Hector Sarno as The Bartender (credited as Hector V. Sarno)
- Frank Evans as Policeman
- Edwin August as The Bank President (unconfirmed)
- Frank Norcross as In Detective Agency
- Raoul Walsh as Gang's Driver (unconfirmed)

== See also ==
- List of American films of 1913
- Harry Carey filmography
