= Doris Hill =

American actress (1905–1976)

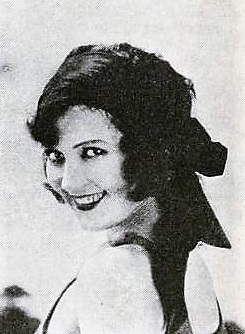
- Hill in 1929
- Born: March 21, 1905; Roswell, New Mexico, U.S.
- Died: March 3, 1976 (aged 70); Kingman, Arizona, U.S.
- Occupation: Film actress
- Spouse(s): George L. Derrick (1932–1933, divorce); Monte Brice (unknown)

Doris Hill (March 21, 1905 – March 3, 1976), born Roberta M. Hill, was an American film actress of the 1920s and 1930s.

== Early years ==
Born and raised in Roswell, New Mexico, Hill was the daughter of rancher William A. Hill. She was educated in Fort Worth, Texas.

When she was a child, Hill began dancing in public. A Warner Bros. casting director saw her dancing at the Metropolitan Theater in Los Angeles, which led to her making a screen test.

== Career ==
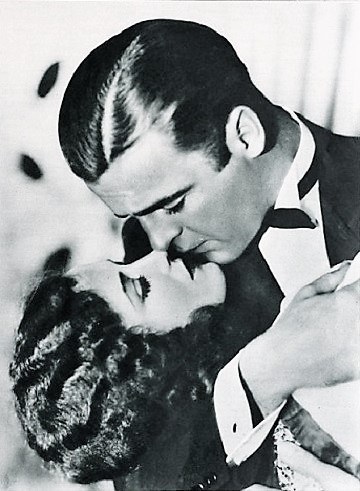
Doris Hill and Neil Hamilton in The Studio Murder Mystery (1929)

Hill moved to Hollywood in the mid-1920s to pursue an acting career. First working as a vaudeville dancer, she received her first film acting role in 1926 when she starred alongside George O'Hara in The Better 'Ole. She starred in 17 films from 1926 to 1929, and unlike many silent film stars, she made a successful transition to talking films.

In 1929, Hill was selected as one of 13 actresses to be WAMPAS Baby Stars. On contract with Paramount Pictures, she starred in four films in 1930, including Sons of the Saddle with Western actor Ken Maynard. Western film roles became her most common parts, with her often starring opposite Tom Tyler. In 1932, she starred in another six films, four of which were Westerns. In 1933, she starred in four films, all Westerns, and by 1934, her career had slowed to almost no roles.

Her last acting role was in the 1934 Western Ridin' Gents opposite Jack Perrin and Ben Corbett.

== Personal life ==
Hill retired and married actor George L. Derrick in June 1932, but they divorced shortly after. She then married Hollywood director, producer and writer Monte Brice, and eventually moved to Kingman, Arizona.

== Death ==
Hill died in Kingman, Arizona, on March 3, 1976, aged 70.

== Partial filmography ==
- Tom and His Pals (1926)
- The Better 'Ole (1926)
- Rough House Rosie (1927)
- Tell It to Sweeney (1927)
- The Beauty Shoppers (1927)
- Figures Don't Lie (1927)
- Tillie's Punctured Romance (1928)
- Court Martial (1928)
- Take Me Home (1928)
- A Thief in the Dark (1928)
- Avalanche (1928)
- The Studio Murder Mystery (1929)
- His Glorious Night (1929)
- Darkened Rooms (1929)
- Men Are Like That (1930)
- Code of Honor (1930)
- Song of the Caballero (1930)
- Sons of the Saddle (1930)
- The One Way Trail (1931)
- The Montana Kid (1931)
- Spirit of the West (1932)
- South of the Rio Grande (1932)
- Tangled Destinies (1932)
- Battling Buckaroo (1932)
- The Texas Tornado (1932)
- Galloping Romeo (1933)
- Via Pony Express (1933)
- Trailing North (1933)
