= Max Hoffman, Jr. =

Max Hoffman, Jr. (December 13, 1902 – March 31, 1945) was an American actor and dancer.

== Biography ==
The son of musician Max Hoffman and dancer Gertrude Hoffmann, Max Hoffman Jr. was born in Norfolk, Virginia. He was educated at Cascadilla School in Ithaca, New York and Bordentown Military Institute in Bordentown, New Jersey. He began his stage career as a teenager as dance partner to his mother in the revue Gertrude Hoffmann’s Revue during World War I. He was pulled from school after his mother had lost six male dance partners who were all drafted. He married actress and soprano Norma Terris (real name Norma Cook) in 1921. They worked as the vaudeville duo Junior and Terris until their divorce five year later.

Hoffman played Tom in the 1922 Broadway musical Queen O' Hearts at George M. Cohan's Theatre. This was followed by the role of Lieut. Charles Martin in Captain Jinks (1925-1926, Martin Beck Theatre), and a featured part in the Broadway revue Gay Paree (1926-1927, Winter Garden Theatre). He portrayed Tom Martin in Jerome Kern and Oscar Hammerstein II's Sweet Adeline at Hammerstein's Theatre during the 1929-1930 Broadway season. At that same theatre he starred in the musical Ballyhoo of 1930 in the 1930-1931 season. In 1930 he married actress Thelma White. They divorced in 1932.

On February 1, 1933, Hoffman married the actress Helen Kane in Washington, D. C. Both he and Kane starred in the 1933 Broadway musical Shady Lady at the Shubert Theatre. His marriage to Kane ended in divorce in 1935. In 1936 he married actress Luana Walters. In addition to working on the stage, he also worked as a film actor. Some of his film roles included Hartigan in Sailor Be Good (1933), Torchy Myers in King of Hockey (1936), Cab Driver Charlie in Stranger on the Third Floor (1940) Frayne in Granny Get Your Gun (1940), Kearney in Black Dragons (1942), and Hymie in Freckles Comes Home (1942).

Hoffman's last appearance on Broadway was in the musical Good Night, Ladies (1945) which closed a week before his unexpected death on March 31, 1945 in New York City. His wife Luana found him dead at their apartment with the cause of death being determined as an accidental overdose from sleeping pills.
