= The Campus Flirt =

1926 film directed by Clarence Badger

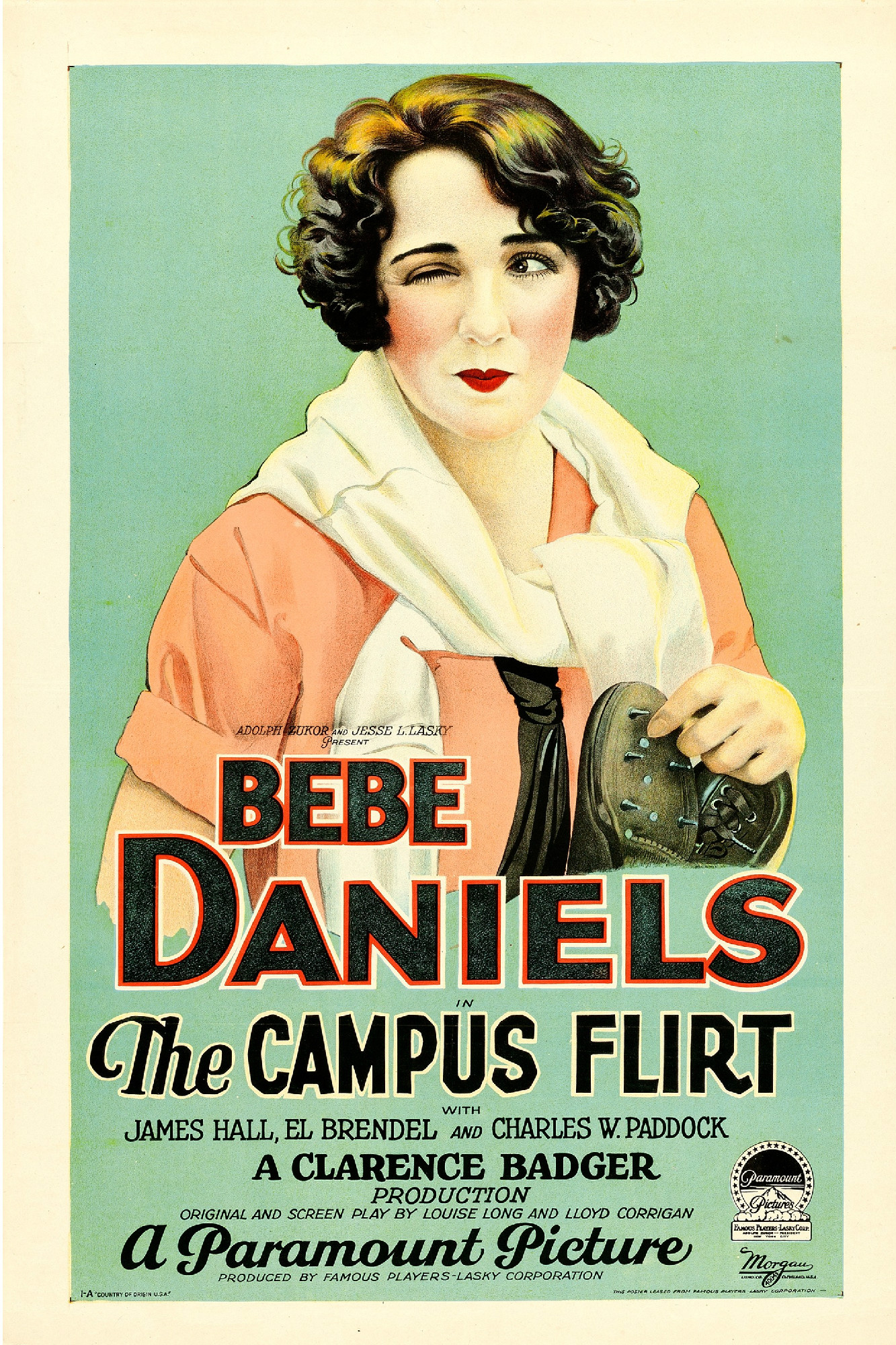
- Movie poster
- Directed by: Clarence Badger
- Written by: Louise Long; Lloyd Corrigan
- Produced by: Adolph Zukor; Jesse Lasky
- Starring: Bebe Daniels
- Cinematography: H. Kinley Martin
- Distributed by: Paramount Pictures
- Release date: September 18, 1926
- Running time: 70 minutes; 7 reels
- Country: United States
- Language: Silent (English intertitles)

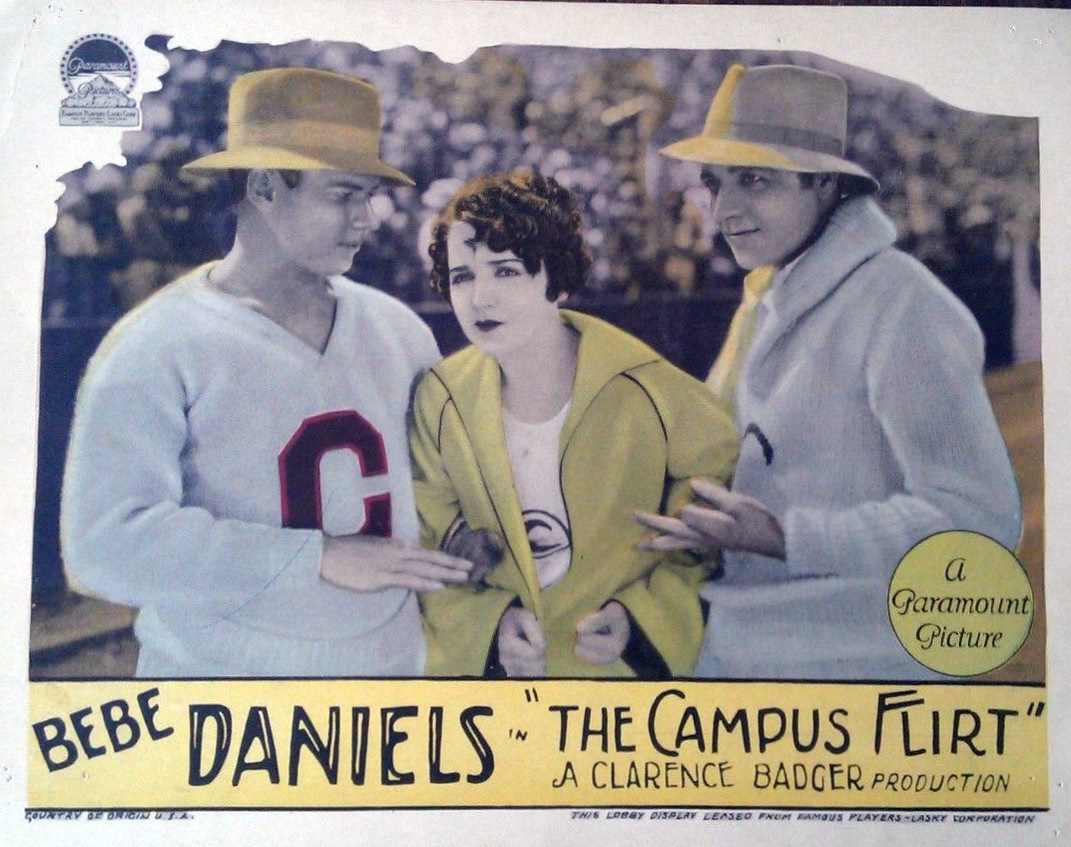
Lobby card

The Campus Flirt (a.k.a. The College Flirt) is a lost 1926 American silent comedy film produced by Famous Players–Lasky and distributed by Paramount Pictures. It was directed by Clarence Badger and starred Bebe Daniels. Comedian El Brendel makes his film debut here.

== Plot ==
Patricia, spoiled by her mother, is sent by her father to his alma mater to get her head straight. At college, given scant consideration by her favored sorority, she falls in with the “fast set” and gets mixed up in a kidnapping. One afternoon, while ridiculing the girl’s track team, a white rat climbs her leg. Panicked, she sprints past the entire team, revealing her unknown talent. A handsome undergraduate talks her into going out for the team. She gives up partying and drinking. Olympic sprint champ Charley Paddock, under his own name, becomes her coach. During the big meet, spies from the rival school kidnap her. She escapes in time to join the relay and anchor the team to victory—while winning her ungrad beau.

== Cast ==
- Bebe Daniels as Patricia Mansfield
- James Hall as Denis Adams
- El Brendel as Knute Knudson
- Charley Paddock as himself
- Joan Standing as Harriet Porter
- Gilbert Roland as Graham Stearns
- Irma Komelia as Mae
- Jocelyn Lee as Gwen

== Notes ==
Exteriors were shot on the University of California, Berkeley campus, writer Lloyd Corrigan's alma mater.

Daniels and Paddock became engaged after a whirlwind romance, as widely reported during the movie’s rollout. In June 1927, they announced the end of the engagement and the desire to remain “just friends.”
