= The One Way Trail =

1931 film

- Directed by: Ray Taylor
- Written by: George H. Plympton; Claude Rister
- Produced by: Irving Briskin
- Starring: Tim McCoy; Doris Hill; Carroll Nye
- Cinematography: John Hickson
- Edited by: Otto Meyer
- Production company: Columbia Pictures
- Distributed by: Columbia Pictures
- Release date: October 15, 1931
- Running time: 60 minutes
- Country: United States
- Language: English

The One Way Trail is a 1931 pre-Code American Western film directed by Ray Taylor and starring Tim McCoy, Doris Hill and Carroll Nye.

== Plot ==
After finding his brother dying from a wound, a reformed gambler (McCoy) takes a job as a dealer to try to catch the man his brother named as his killer. Eventually an impostor is revealed as the real killer.

== Cast ==
- Tim McCoy as Tim Allen
- Doris Hill as Helen Beck
- Carroll Nye as Terry Allen
- Polly Ann Young as Mollie
- Robert Homans as George Beck
- Al Ferguson as Coldeye Cornell

== Bibliography ==
- Pitts, Michael R. Western Movies: A Guide to 5,105 Feature Films. McFarland, 2012.
