= A Regular Fellow (1925 film) =

1925 film by A. Edward Sutherland

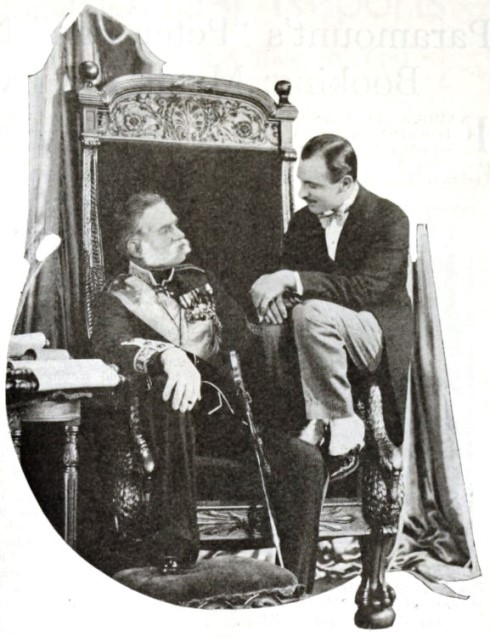
- Still with Power and Griffith
- Directed by: A. Edward Sutherland
- Screenplay by: Joseph A. Mitchell; Reggie Morris; Keene Thompson
- Produced by: Jesse L. Lasky; Adolph Zukor
- Starring: Raymond Griffith; Mary Brian; Tyrone Power Sr. Edgar Norton; Nigel De Brulier; Gustav von Seyffertitz; Kathleen Kirkham
- Cinematography: Charles P. Boyle
- Production company: Famous Players–Lasky Corporation
- Distributed by: Paramount Pictures
- Release date: October 5, 1925
- Running time: 50 minutes
- Country: United States
- Language: Silent (English intertitles)

A Regular Fellow is a 1925 American silent comedy film directed by A. Edward Sutherland and written by Joseph A. Mitchell, Reggie Morris and Keene Thompson. The film stars Raymond Griffith, Mary Brian, Tyrone Power Sr., Edgar Norton, Nigel De Brulier, Gustav von Seyffertitz, and Kathleen Kirkham. The film was released on October 5, 1925, by Paramount Pictures.

The film had a working title of He's A Prince. It is believed to be lost.

== Plot ==
As described in a film magazine review, the Prince, weary of his job, tries to quit, but the King will not allow it. He meets and falls in love with a tourist Girl, but he is commanded to marry a Princess from a neighboring kingdom, who is in love with a guardsman. By a happy turn of events, the King is dethroned; the Prince is made president of the newly created republic, and he marries the Girl.

== Cast ==
- Raymond Griffith as The Prince
- Mary Brian as Girl
- Tyrone Power Sr. as King
- Edgar Norton as Valet
- Nigel De Brulier as Revolutionary
- Gustav von Seyffertitz as Prime Minister
- Kathleen Kirkham as Girl's companion
- Carl Stockdale as Royal aide
- Michael Dark as Royal aide
- Lincoln Plumer as Tourist guide
- Jacqueline Gadsden as Princess
- Jere Austin as Lover
- William Bakewell (uncredited)
- Granville Redmond (uncredited)

== Preservation ==
With no prints of A Regular Fellow located in any film archives, it is a lost film.
