= The Studio Murder Mystery =

1929 film

- Directed by: Frank Tuttle
- Screenplay by: Ethel Doherty; A. Channing Edington; Carmen Ballen Edington; Joseph L. Mankiewicz; Frank Tuttle
- Produced by: Victor D. Voyda
- Starring: Neil Hamilton; Doris Hill; Warner Oland; Fredric March; Chester Conklin; Florence Eldridge; Guy Oliver
- Cinematography: Victor Milner
- Edited by: Merrill G. White
- Music by: Karl Hajos
- Production company: Paramount Pictures
- Distributed by: Paramount Pictures
- Release date: June 1, 1929
- Running time: 62 minutes
- Country: United States
- Language: English

The Studio Murder Mystery is a 1929 American mystery film directed by Frank Tuttle and written by Ethel Doherty, A. Channing Edington, Carmen Ballen Edington, Joseph L. Mankiewicz and Frank Tuttle. The film stars Neil Hamilton, Doris Hill, Warner Oland, Fredric March, Chester Conklin, Florence Eldridge and Guy Oliver. The film was released on June 1, 1929, by Paramount Pictures.

== Plot ==
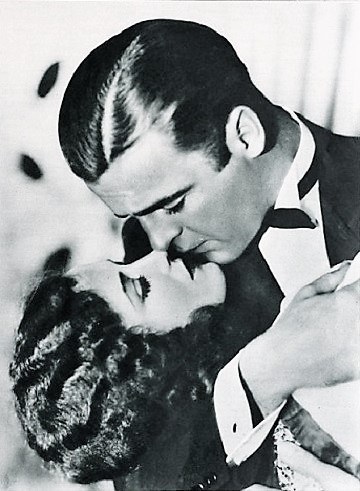
Doris Hill and Neil Hamilton in The Studio Murder Mystery (1929)

The Studio Murder Mystery (1929)

Richard Hardell, an actor who has had many affairs, is murdered at a movie studio. His jealous wife Blanche, his director Rupert Borka, and a girl he mistreated, Helen MacDonald, all have reasons for wanting him dead.

== Cast ==
- Neil Hamilton as Tony White
- Doris Hill as Helen MacDonald
- Warner Oland as Rupert Borka
- Fredric March as Richard Hardell
- Chester Conklin as George
- Florence Eldridge as Blanche Hardell
- Guy Oliver as MacDonald
- Donald MacKenzie as Captain Coffin
- Gardner James as Ted MacDonald
- Eugene Pallette as Detective Lieutenant Dirk

== See also ==
- List of early sound feature films (1926–1929)
