= James Hall (actor) =

American actor

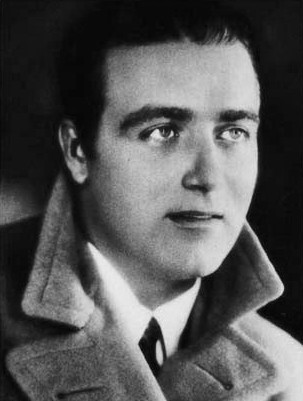
- Hall in 1930
- Born: James E. Brown; October 22, 1900
- Died: June 7, 1940 (aged 39); Jersey City, New Jersey, U.S.
- Occupation: Actor
- Years active: 1923–1932
- Spouse: Irene Gardner

James Hall (born James E. Brown; October 22, 1900 – June 7, 1940) was an American film actor.

== Career ==
Hall debuted as an actor at age 15 in the Ziegfeld Follies.

Hall began his film career during the silent film era. He made his sound film debut in the 1929 film The Canary Murder Case, opposite William Powell and Louise Brooks.

In 1930, he co-starred in Howard Hughes' epic film, Hell's Angels. His last film role was in the 1932 drama Manhattan Tower. In the following years, he headlined in vaudeville at the Loew's State Theatres in 1932 and 1933 and in such independent stage productions as Ches Davis's 1934 edition of the Chicago Follies and in another show, the Showboat Follies at the Deadwood Theatre in South Dakota (1934).

At the time of his death, he had fallen into obscurity and had been earning his livelihood by performing in small nightclubs and cabarets in New Jersey and New York.

== Death ==
Hall died of cirrhosis on June 7, 1940, in Jersey City, New Jersey, at age 39.

== Filmography ==
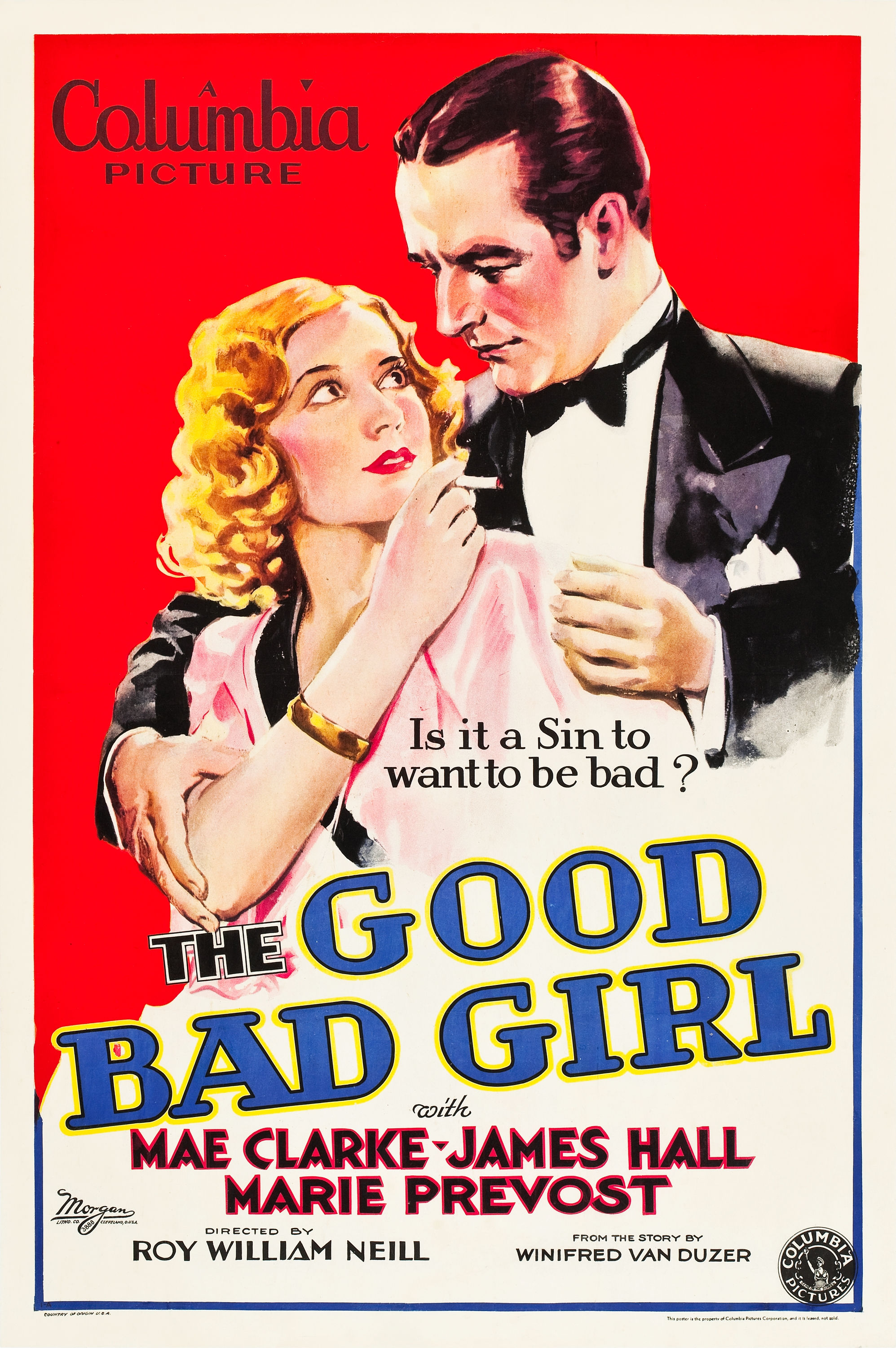
Poster for The Good Bad Girl (1931)

Year	Title	Role	Notes
1923	Man Alone	Caspar Dent	
1926	The Campus Flirt	Denis Adams	Alternative title: The College Flirt; Lost film
1926	Stranded in Paris	Robert Van Wye	Lost film
1927	Hotel Imperial	Lt. Paul Almasy	
1927	Love's Greatest Mistake	Harvey Gibbs	Lost film
1927	Señorita	Roger Oliveros	
1927	Ritzy	Harrington Smith, Duke of Westborough	Lost film
1927	Rolled Stockings	Jim Treadway	Lost film
1927	Swim Girl, Swim	Jerry Marvin	Lost film
1927	Silk Legs	Phil Barker	Lost film
1928	Four Sons	Joseph "Dutch" Bernle	
1928	The Fifty-Fifty Girl	Jim Donahue	Lost film
1928	Just Married	Bob Adams	Lost film
1928	The Fleet's In	Eddie Briggs	Lost film
1929	The Case of Lena Smith	Franz Hofrat	Lost film A four minute fragment is preserved
1929	The Canary Murder Case	Jimmy Spotswoode	
1929	This Is Heaven	James Stackpoole	
1929	Smiling Irish Eyes	Rory O'More	Lost film Vitaphone soundtrack exists
1929	The Saturday Night Kid	William Taylor	Alternative title: Love 'Em and Leave 'Em
1930	Paramount on Parade	Hunter	("Dream Girl" sequence)
1930	Hell's Angels	Roy Rutledge	
1930	Dangerous Nan McGrew	Bob Dawes	
1930	Let's Go Native	Wally Wendell	
1930	Galas de la Paramount		Episode 'Dream Girl'
1930	Maybe It's Love	Tommy Nelson	Alternative title: Eleven Men and a Girl
1930	The Third Alarm	Dan	
1930	Man to Man		Uncredited; Alternative title: Barber John's Boy
1930	Divorce Among Friends	George Morris	
1931	Millie	John "Jack" Maitland	
1931	The Lightning Flyer	Jimmie Nelson	
1931	The She-Wolf	David Talbot	Alternative titles: Mother's Millions; The She-Wolf of Wall Street
1931	The Good Bad Girl	Bob Henderson	
1931	Sporting Chance	Phillip Lawrence	Alternative title: Aventura Hipica
1932	Manhattan Tower	Jimmy Duncan	(final film role)
