= Breakfast for Two =

1937 film by Alfred Santell

- Movie poster
- Directed by: Alfred Santell
- Screenplay by: Charles Kaufman; Paul Yawitz; Viola Brothers Shore
- Based on: A Love Like That; 1937 novel by David Garth
- Produced by: Edward Kaufman
- Starring: Barbara Stanwyck; Herbert Marshall; Glenda Farrell
- Cinematography: J. Roy Hunt
- Edited by: George Hively
- Music by: Max Steiner
- Production company: RKO Radio Pictures
- Distributed by: RKO Radio Pictures
- Release date: October 22, 1937
- Running time: 67 minutes
- Country: United States
- Language: English
- Budget: $500,000

Breakfast for Two is a 1937 American screwball comedy film directed by Alfred Santell and starring Barbara Stanwyck, Herbert Marshall and Glenda Farrell. The film was produced and distributed by RKO Pictures, but was a commercial failure for the studio. Stanwyck and Marshall worked together once more, immediately following this film, on the 20th Century-Fox drama Always Goodbye (1938).

== Plot ==
After drunkenly carousing on the town, idle playboy, Jonathan Blair, wakes up to find that Texan Valentine Ransome has spent the night in his mansion. He remembers little of the night and knows little about his houseguest. Valentine is attracted to Jonathan and sets out first to reform and then to marry him, explaining to her horse-breaking uncle Sam that she intends to "slip a bit in his mouth and make him like it". In her way is Jonathan's girlfriend, actress Carol Wallace.

Jonathan is dismayed to discover that his neglected family shipping firm is in dire trouble, and that he will not be receiving his usual check, leaving him broke. Valentine decides to use this news to ignite his ambition. She buys up controlling interest in the company and moves into his home as the new tenant. When he discovers the identity of the new owner, he wrongly assumes she went out with him solely to learn what she could about the company. Furious, he tells her that he will fight to get the company back, but later, to his valet, Butch, he admits he is beaten, as nobody will lend him the money he needs to make the attempt. Butch, who approves of Valentine, informs her of this. She makes Jonathan vice president, but he visits the office only to inform her that Carol has asked him to marry her, and that he has accepted.

That afternoon, Valentine tries her best to disrupt the ceremony, with the help of noisy bearded window washers, presided over by an increasingly frustrated Justice of the Peace. Finally, Sam Ransome bursts in and declares that Carol is the mother of his children. The wedding is off, but one of the guests, Mr. Meggs, recognizes Sam and informs Jonathan.

The next day, Jonathan outlines to the firm's receivership board his bold new plan to get the company back on its financial feet. The board members vote to accept his scheme and return control of the business to him. Valentine is pleased by his display of initiative and drive ... until he tells her that the wedding with Carol is back on. In desperation, Butch produces a forged marriage certificate showing that Valentine and Jonathan are husband and wife. Carol leaves in a huff.

After Butch informs Valentine of the deception, she continues the masquerade, much to Jonathan's discomfort. When Butch confesses the truth to Jonathan, however, the tables are turned. She flees from her suddenly amorous "husband". However, at the train station, they make peace and get married for real.

== Cast ==
- Barbara Stanwyck as Valentine Ransome
- Herbert Marshall as Jonathan Blair
- Glenda Farrell as Carol Wallace
- Eric Blore as Butch, Blair's Valet
- Donald Meek as Justice of the Peace
- Etienne Girardot as Mr. Meggs
- Frank M. Thomas as Sam Ransome
- Pierre Watkin as Gordon Faraday
- Harold Goodwin as Joe
- Sidney Bracey as Clarence
- Bodil Rosing as Nanny
- Bobby Barber as Window Washer
- Maxine Jennings as Wedding Guest

== Bibliography ==
- Jewell, Richard B. RKO Radio Pictures: A Titan Is Born. University of California Press, 2012.
- Wilson, Victoria. A Life of Barbara Stanwyck: Steel-True 1907-1940. Simon and Schuster, 2015.
