= The Lightning Flyer =

1931 film

- Directed by: William Nigh
- Written by: Barry Barringer
- Starring: James Hall; Dorothy Sebastian; Robert Homans
- Cinematography: Ted Tetzlaff
- Edited by: James Sweeney
- Production company: Columbia Pictures
- Distributed by: Columbia Pictures
- Release date: March 20, 1931
- Running time: 62 minutes
- Country: United States
- Language: English

The Lightning Flyer is a 1931 American pre-Code action film directed by William Nigh and starring James Hall, Dorothy Sebastian and Robert Homans.

== Plot ==
After graduating from college, the son of a railroad president takes a job working for the company under an assumed name to prove that he isn't as lazy as his father thinks. He falls in love but also makes a bitter enemy in the yard foreman. After exposing the man as a thief and a murderer, his antagonist breaks out of prison and seeks revenge by way of a runaway train.

== Cast ==
- James Hall as Jimmie Nelson
- Dorothy Sebastian as Rose Rogers
- Walter Merrill as Tom Summers
- Robert Homans as John Nelson
- Albert J. Smith as Durkin
- Ethan Allen as Sam Rogers
- Eddie Boland as Slats
- George Meadows as Pudge

== Bibliography ==
- Martin, Len D. Columbia Checklist: The Feature Films, Serials, Cartoons, and Short Subjects of Columbia Pictures Corporation, 1922-1988. McFarland, 1991.
