= Fashions in Love =

1929 film by Victor Schertzinger

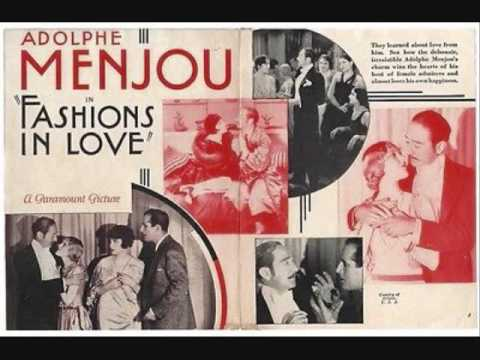
- Directed by: Victor Schertzinger
- Screenplay by: Hermann Bahr (play); Melville Baker; Richard H. Digges Jr. Louise Long
- Starring: Adolphe Menjou; Fay Compton; Miriam Seegar; John Miljan; Joan Standing; Robert Wayne
- Cinematography: Edward Cronjager
- Edited by: George Nichols Jr.
- Music by: Oscar Potoker
- Production company: Paramount Pictures
- Distributed by: Paramount Pictures
- Release date: June 29, 1929
- Running time: 73 minutes
- Country: United States
- Language: English

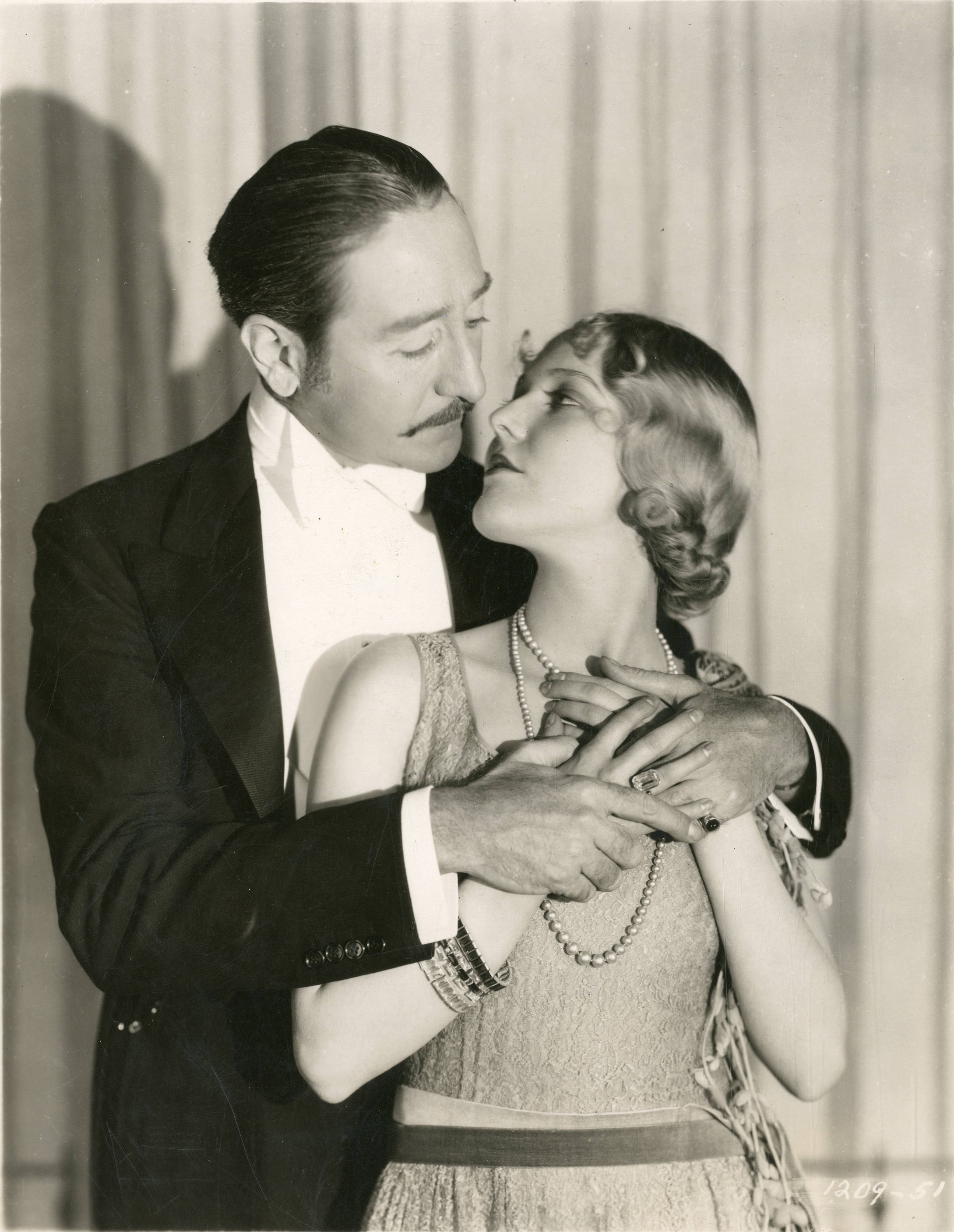
Scene from Fashions in Love

Fashions in Love is a 1929 American pre-Code comedy film adapted by Melville Baker, Richard H. Digges Jr., and Louise Long from the play The Concert by Hermann Bahr. It was directed by Victor Schertzinger and stars Adolphe Menjou, Fay Compton, Miriam Seegar, John Miljan, and Joan Standing. The film was released on June 29, 1929, by Paramount Pictures.

== Plot ==
A concert pianist, the romantic idol of many women, is seduced away from his wife. The seductress's husband takes in the pianist's wife, and all four pretend to be happy with the new arrangement.

== Cast ==
- Adolphe Menjou as Paul de Remy
- Fay Compton as Marie De Remy
- Miriam Seegar as Delphine Martin
- John Miljan as Frank Martin
- Joan Standing as Miss Weller
- Russ Powell as Joe
- Billie Bennett as Jane

== Music ==
The film features two theme songs which are entitled "Delphine" and "I Still Believe In You" and which were both composed by Victor Schertzinger. In the film, "Delphine" is sung by Adolphe Menjou while “I Still Believe in You” is sung by Fay Compton.
