= Freckles Comes Home =

1942 film by Jean Yarbrough

- Directed by: Jean Yarbrough
- Written by: Jeannette Stratton-Porter (novel Freckles Comes Home); Edmond Kelso (screenplay)
- Produced by: Lindsley Parsons (producer)
- Starring: See below
- Cinematography: Mack Stengler
- Edited by: Jack Ogilvie
- Distributed by: Monogram Pictures
- Release date: 1942
- Running time: 63 minutes
- Country: United States
- Language: English

Freckles Comes Home is a 1942 American film directed by Jean Yarbrough based on the novel by Jeannette Stratton-Porter that was a sequel to Freckles by her mother Gene Stratton-Porter.

== Plot ==
Freckles Winslow is on his way home from college. On the bus he encounters a crook, "Muggsy" Dolan who calls himself Jack Leach. Jack is on the run from the law, and is looking for a safe place to hide. The two men come to talking and Freckles mentions his serene home town to Jack, having only good things to say about it. Jack decides to tag along and take his refuge in Freckles home town. With Freckles help he gets to stay at the local hotel, owned by Danny Doyle, who is Freckles’ friend. Danny is about to rerun the road through town, so that it runs over a number of worthless lots of land he has bought. Danny bought the real estate because he thought he could find gold on them, using a new expensive device he has bought. Danny needs Freckles to help him get a favorable decision by Freckles’ father, who is one of the two road commissioners.

When Jack's crooked friend Nate Quigley arrives in town, he pretends to be interested in buying lots from Danny, in order to pull a scam on him. Danny gets a green light for the road development, but Jack is found dead in his hotel room. Constable Weaver gets suspicious. Freckles, who has fallen in love with Jane Potter, his childhood friend, suspects the newcomer Quigley of the deed, but doesn't seem to convince anyone else. Both constable Weaver and road commissioner Potter are fooled when two of Jack's old friends arrive in town, pretending to be FBI agents investigating Jack's death. Quigley and the two men then break in at the local bank. Freckles gets help from Danny to fix the car which the criminals are to use to escape, but the two crooks end up killing Quigley and take both Freckles and Jeff, the hotel porter, hostage. The robbers manage to crash the car and the pursuing constable Weaver is able to arrest them. The road development then starts, and Danny's finances are saved by the reward for capturing the bank robbers. After this turn of events, Jane thinks of Freckles as a real hero.

== Cast ==
- Johnny Downs as "Freckles" Winslow
- Gale Storm as Jane Potter
- Mantan Moreland as Jeff - the Hotel Porter
- Irving Bacon as Constable Caleb Weaver
- Bradley Page as Nate Quigley
- Marvin Stephens as Danny Doyle
- Betty Blythe as Mrs. Minerva Potter
- Walter Sande as "Muggsy" Dolan, aka Jack Leach
- Max Hoffman Jr. as Hymie
- John Ince as Hiram Potter
- Laurence Criner as Roxbury B. Brown, III
- Irving Mitchell as Mr. Winslow
- Gene O'Donnell as Monk
- Si Jenks as Lem Perkins

== Soundtrack ==
- Gale Storm and Johnny Downs - "Where We Dream Tonight" (Written by Eddie Cherkose as Edward Cherkose and Edward J. Kay as Edward Kay)
- The Barndance Band - "Turkey in the Straw"
- The Barndance Band - "Gwine to Rune All Night" aka "De Camptown Races" (Written by Stephen Foster)
- The Barndance Band - "Oh! Susanna" (Written by Stephen Foster)
- Gale Storm - "Swing a Little Jingle" (Written by Eddie Cherkose as Edward Cherkose and Edward J. Kay as Edward Kay)
