= Figures Don't Lie =

1927 film by A. Edward Sutherland

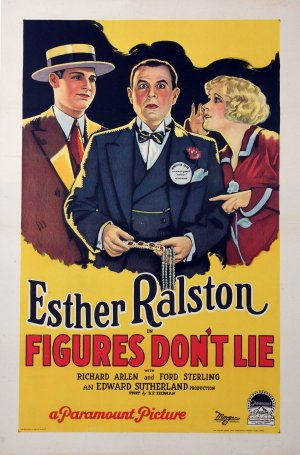
- Theatrical release poster
- Directed by: A. Edward Sutherland
- Screenplay by: Ethel Doherty; Grover Jones; Louise Long; Herman J. Mankiewicz
- Story by: B. F. Zeidman
- Produced by: B. P. Schulberg; Jesse L. Lasky; Adolph Zukor
- Starring: Esther Ralston; Richard Arlen; Ford Sterling; Doris Hill; Blanche Payson; Natalie Kingston
- Cinematography: Alfred Gilks
- Production company: Famous Players–Lasky Corporation
- Distributed by: Paramount Pictures
- Release date: October 8, 1927
- Running time: 60 minutes
- Country: United States
- Language: Silent (English intertitles)

Figures Don't Lie is a 1927 American silent comedy film directed by A. Edward Sutherland and written by Ethel Doherty and Louise Long from an adaptation by Grover Jones of a story by B. F. Zeidman, with intertitles by Herman J. Mankiewicz. The film stars Esther Ralston, Richard Arlen, Ford Sterling, Doris Hill, Blanche Payson, and Natalie Kingston. The film was released on October 9, 1927, by Paramount Pictures.

== Plot ==
According to the AFI, the plot of this lost film revolved around Janet Wells, the secretary of "Howdy" Jones, whose wife's jealous behaviour is problematic, and other flirting attempts among them and other company employees, including the new sales manager, Bob Blewe, and Dolores, a stenographer.

== Cast ==
- Esther Ralston as Janet Wells
- Richard Arlen as Bob Blewe
- Ford Sterling as 'Howdy' Jones
- Doris Hill as Mamie
- Blanche Payson as Mrs. Jones
- Natalie Kingston as Dolores

== Preservation status ==
The film is now lost.
