= The Beauty Shoppers =

1927 film

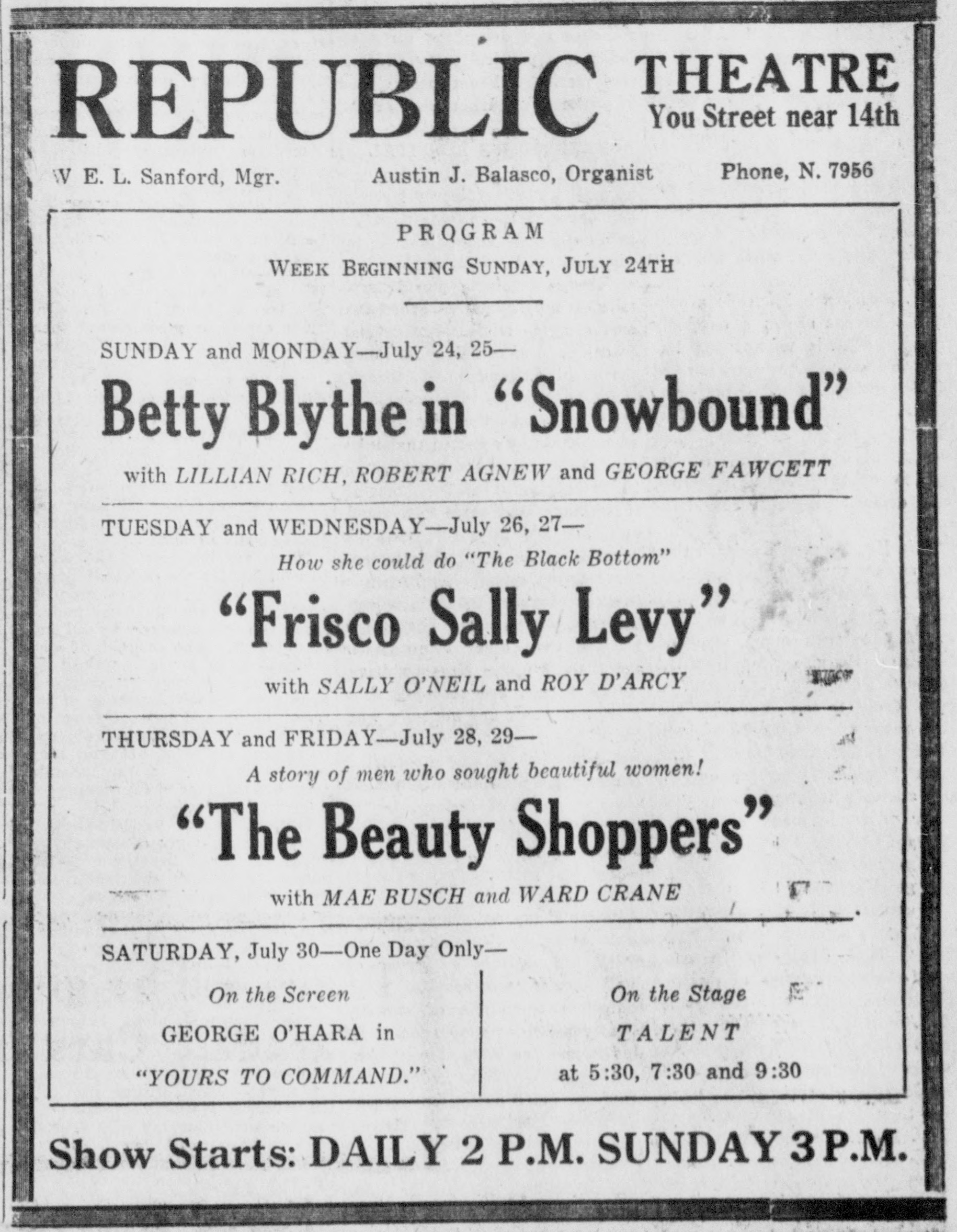
- Contemporary advertisement for The Beauty Shoppers and several other films
- Directed by: Louis J. Gasnier
- Written by: Travers Lane; Jack Natteford
- Produced by: Jacques Haïk
- Starring: Mae Busch; Doris Hill; Ward Crane
- Cinematography: Joseph A. Du Bray; Stephen S. Norton
- Edited by: James C. McKay
- Production company: Tiffany Pictures
- Distributed by: Tiffany Pictures
- Release date: April 15, 1927
- Running time: 60 minutes (5,669 ft.)
- Country: United States
- Languages: Silent; English intertitles

The Beauty Shoppers is a 1927 American silent comedy film directed by Louis J. Gasnier and starring Mae Busch, Doris Hill and Ward Crane.

== Cast ==
- Mae Busch as Mabel Hines
- Doris Hill as Peggy Raymond
- Ward Crane as Sloane Maddox
- Thomas Haines as Dick Merwin
- Cissy Fitzgerald as Mrs. Schuyler
- James A. Marcus as Sam Billings
- Leo White as Achille
- Dale Fuller as Olga
- William A. Carroll as Mr. Schuyler

== Preservation ==
The film is preserved in France; at Archives Du Film Du CNC, Bois d'Arcy.

== Bibliography ==
- Munden, Kenneth White. The American Film Institute Catalog of Motion Pictures Produced in the United States, Part 1. University of California Press, 1997.
