= Sailor Be Good =

1933 film by James Cruze

- Theatrical release poster
- Directed by: James Cruze
- Screenplay by: Ethel Doherty; Viola Brothers Shore; Ralph Spence
- Story by: Frank O'Connor
- Produced by: Joseph I. Schnitzer; Samuel Zierler
- Starring: Jack Oakie; Vivienne Osborne; George E. Stone; Max Hoffman Jr. Lincoln Stedman
- Cinematography: Charles Edgar Schoenbaum
- Edited by: Viola Lawrence
- Production company: Jefferson Pictures Corporation
- Distributed by: RKO Pictures
- Release date: March 7, 1933
- Running time: 58 minutes
- Country: United States
- Language: English

Sailor Be Good is a 1933 American Pre-Code comedy film directed by James Cruze and written by Ethel Doherty, Viola Brothers Shore and Ralph Spence. Starring Jack Oakie, Vivienne Osborne, George E. Stone, Max Hoffman Jr. and Lincoln Stedman, the film was released on March 7, 1933, by RKO Pictures.

== Cast ==
- Jack Oakie as Kelsey Jones
- Vivienne Osborne as Red Dale
- George E. Stone as Murphy
- Max Hoffman, Jr. as Hartigan
- Lincoln Stedman as Slim
- Gertrude Michael as Kay Whitney
- Huntley Gordon as Mr. Whitney
- Charles Coleman as Butler

== Trivia ==
Future pulp-writer and screenwriter, and ex-Navy man, Steve Fisher served as technical advisor and appeared on screen in an uncredited bit part.
