= River of Romance =

1929 film

- The full film
- Directed by: Richard Wallace
- Screenplay by: Ethel Doherty; Joseph L. Mankiewicz; Booth Tarkington; Dan Totheroh; John V.A. Weaver
- Starring: Charles "Buddy" Rogers; Mary Brian; June Collyer; Henry B. Walthall; Wallace Beery; Fred Kohler; Natalie Kingston
- Cinematography: Victor Milner
- Edited by: Alyson Shaffer
- Music by: Karl Hajos
- Production company: Christie Film Company
- Distributed by: Paramount Pictures
- Release date: June 29, 1929
- Running time: 78 minutes
- Country: United States
- Language: English

River of Romance is a 1929 American drama film directed by Richard Wallace and written by Ethel Doherty, Joseph L. Mankiewicz, Dan Totheroh and John V.A. Weaver.

River of Romance stars Charles "Buddy" Rogers, Mary Brian, June Collyer, Henry B. Walthall, Wallace Beery, Fred Kohler and Natalie Kingston. It is based on the play Magnolia by Booth Tarkington. The film was released on June 29, 1929, by Paramount Pictures.

== Plot ==
During the 1840's, Tom Rumford is a 21-year-old man who has been raised by Quaker relatives in Philadelphia, Pennsylvania. However, he is the son of General Jeff Rumford, the owner of a plantation in Mississippi. Tom finally returns to his Mississippi family, where he meets Elvira Jeffers, his father's ward. Tom and Elvira fall in love and become engaged.

Meanwhile, Elvira's former boyfriend, Major Patterson, is released from prison. Enraged at Elvira's engagement to Tom, Patterson insults Tom and challenged him to a duel. Raised by non-violent Quakers, Tom laughs off the insult and refuses the challenge. Humiliated by his Tom's refusal to stand up to Patterson, Elvira cancels the engagement and General Rumford banishes him from the plantation. Only Lucy Jeffers, Elvira's younger sister, stands up for him.

A heart-broken Tom wanders into a saloon in Natchez, Mississippi. There he meets and befriends the notorious rogue General Orlando Jackson, who coaches him in Southern rules of manhood. When a feared killer insults Tom in the saloon, Tom beats him up. Disguised as the "Notorious Colonel Blake," Tom returns home for the masquerade ball-debut of Lucy. At the ball, he exposes Patterson's crimes. Suddenly, Tom reveals his true identity. General Rumford welcomes Tom back to the family and he marries Lucy.

== Cast ==
Charles Rogers and Mary Brian

- Charles "Buddy" Rogers as Tom Rumford
- Mary Brian as Lucy Jeffers
- June Collyer as Elvira Jeffers
- Henry B. Walthall as General Jeff Rumford
- Wallace Beery as General Orlando Jackson
- Fred Kohler as Captain Blackie
- Natalie Kingston as Mexico
- Walter McGrail as Major Patterson
- Anderson Lawler as Joe Patterson
- Percy Haswell as Madame Rumford
- George H. Reed as Rumbo

== Production ==
The filming of River of Romance began with Jean Arthur in the lead role. However, she dropped out during shooting and was replaced by Mary Brian.

== See also ==
- List of early sound feature films (1926–1929)

== Notes ==
- Lewis, David (1993). Curtis, James (ed.). The Creative Producer. Metuchen: Scarecrow Press. ISBN 0-8108-2720-4.
