= Rough House Rosie =

1927 film

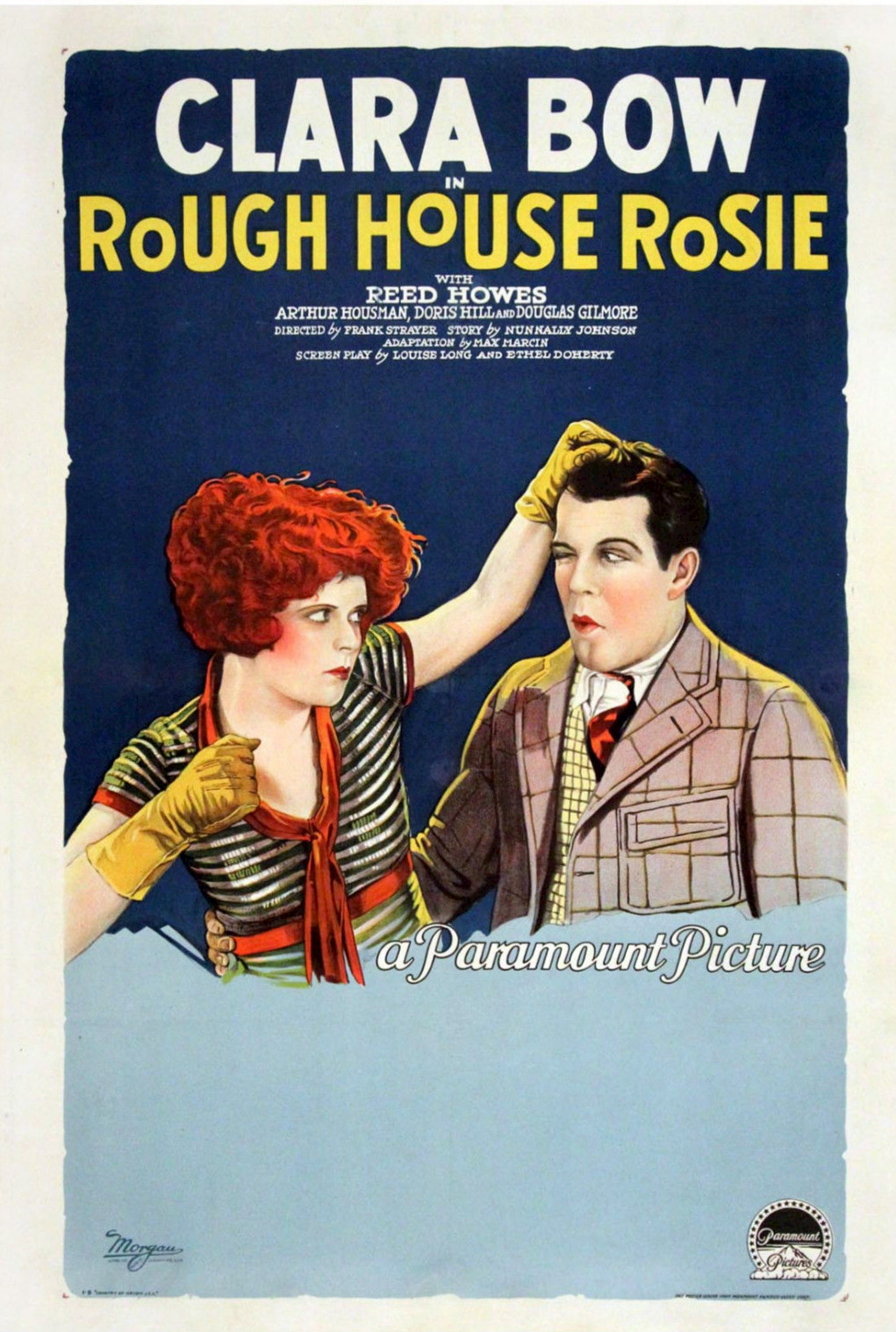
- Clara Bow and Reed Howes in 1927 theatrical poster
- Directed by: Frank Strayer
- Written by: Max Marcin (adaptation); George Marion Jr. (titles)
- Screenplay by: Louise Long; Ethel Doherty
- Story by: Nunnally Johnson
- Based on: "Rough House Rosie" by Nunnally Johnson
- Produced by: B. P. Schulberg
- Starring: Clara Bow; Reed Howes; Arthur Housman; Doris Hill
- Cinematography: Harold Rosson; James Murray
- Production company: Paramount Famous Lasky Corporation
- Distributed by: Paramount Pictures
- Release date: May 14, 1927
- Running time: 66 minutes
- Country: United States
- Language: Silent (English intertitles)
- Budget: $225,000
- Box office: $1,125,000

Rough House Rosie is a 1927 American silent romantic comedy film produced and released by Paramount Pictures and directed by Frank Strayer. The film is a starring vehicle for Clara Bow who was then Paramount's most popular actress. Reed Howes, a model turned actor, is Bow's leading man.

The film was based on the story of the same name by Nunnally Johnson that appeared in The Saturday Evening Post. The story was adapted for the screen by Max Marcin, with a screenplay by Louise Long and Ethel Doherty and titles by George Marion Jr.

== Plot ==
A woman called Rosie O'Reilly (played by Clara Bow) visits Coney Island with a friend and is told by a fortune teller that she will become a famous dancer, she establishes a cabaret act and attempts to rise in society, but faces frequent rejection.

Rosie attempts to help her boyfriend Joe Hennessy (played by Reed Howes) to win a boxing match by creating a distraction.

== Cast ==
- Clara Bow as Rosie O'Reilly
- Reed Howes as Joe Hennessey
- Arthur Housman as Kid Farrell
- Doris Hill as Ruth
- Douglas Gilmore as Arthur Russell
- John Miljan as Lew McKay
- Henry Kolker as W.S. Davids

== Preservation ==
Trailer for Rough House Rosie.

Rough House Rosie is now presumed lost, but a 53-second trailer survives. Although more rediscovered fragments have appeared in a 2012 Documentary Clara Bow: Hollywood's Lost Screen Goddess, however the complete status is unclear.

== See also ==
- List of partially lost films
- List of rediscovered films
- The Main Event (1927)
