= Manhattan Tower (film) =

1932 film

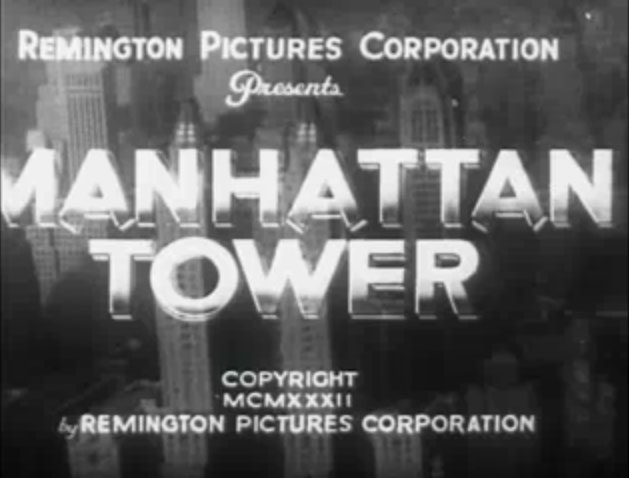
- Directed by: Frank R. Strayer
- Written by: Norman Houston
- Story by: David Hempstead
- Produced by: Larry Darmour (executive producer); A.E. Lefcourt (producer)
- Starring: Mary Brian; James Hall; Irene Rich; Wade Boteler
- Cinematography: Ira H. Morgan
- Edited by: Harry Reynolds
- Production company: Remington Pictures
- Distributed by: Remington Pictures
- Release date: December 1, 1932
- Running time: 67 minutes
- Country: United States
- Language: English

Manhattan Tower is a 1932 American pre-Code drama film directed by Frank R. Strayer starring Mary Brian and James Hall.

== Plot ==
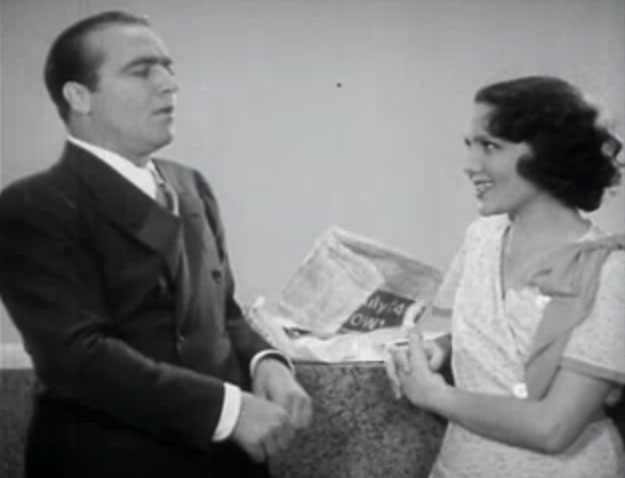
James Hall and Mary Brian

Mary Harper and Jimmy Duncan both work at the Empire State Building, he as an engineer, she as a secretary. They would like to marry and buy a house that they saw advertised in a window in the building lobby, but they need more money.

Mary asks her womanizing boss for advice, and he persuades her to give him all her savings to invest. Unbeknownst to her, the boss has speculated in the commodity market, and lost not only his money and that of his wealthy wife, but also some of the firm's funds too. His wife would like to quietly divorce him to marry her politician friend, but the husband asks her for money to avoid a scandal. When Mary changes her mind and asks for the return of her savings, her boss refuses and mistreats her. That causes a confrontation between Jimmy and Mary's boss, and they fight. Meanwhile, the politician and an honest accountant of the firm, who discovered his superior's misdeeds but kept silent, fearing to lose his job, decide to confront Mary's boss. During the fight, he takes a gun from a drawer, and menaces them all. He trips and falls through a window to his death. The witnesses decide to declare it a suicide and go on with their lives.

There are other intertwining stories of people who work at the Empire State Building, and a bank run started by a casual comment by the politician's secretary.

== Cast ==
- Mary Brian as Mary Harper
- Irene Rich as Ann Burns
- James Hall as Jimmy Duncan
- Hale Hamilton as David Witman
- Noel Francis as Marge Lyon
- Nydia Westman as Miss Wood
- Clay Clement as Kenneth Burns
- Billy Dooley as Crane Eaton
- Jed Prouty as Mr. Hoyt
- Wade Boteler as Mr. Ramsay
- Walter Brennan as Mechanic (uncredited)

== Production ==
David Hempstead completed his original story in February, 1932, and filming both began and completed in September, 1932. The film was shot at Universal City for $50,000. A team of architects and artists built a reproduction of the Empire State Building's lobby, which looked similar but not identical to the original. Exterior scenes featuring the Empire State Building were filmed on location in New York.

== Reception ==
Numerous film critics praised Manhattan Tower for its pacing. “It’s as timely as the alarm clock, fast as ticker tape and modern as the giant skyscraper it pictures,” stated The Daily Argus of Mount Vernon, New York. The Waterbury Democrat hailed the film as “a picture that will thrill you, hold you, touch you and keep you in eager suspense right up until the final fadeout.”

A review from The Daily Home News of New Brunswick, New Jersey, stated, “It possesses the qualities of humor, pathos, and love that go a long way in making the story highly entertaining.” Allison Ind of The Ann Arbor Daily News shared a similar view: “The gradually developing dramatic tension is carefully directed. There is a multiplicity of themes all to be pointed up and polished off at the right moment.”

The New Bedford Standard-Times said of Mary Brian: “Never has this dainty actress been more convincing, or more appealing for that matter. She handles the sympathetic role like the capable actress she is.”

The film received some negative reviews as well. Kate Cameron from the New York Daily News called the film “cheaply made and badly acted.” Howard P. Dimon of The Press of Atlantic City stated, “its people are rubber-stamp editions of the stock melodrama tribe, and the recital of their activities follows a familiar formula with little variance.” Gilbert Kanour of The Baltimore Evening Sun wrote, “the ineptitudes disclosed in its writing, casting and everything else connected with it are simply beyond belief.” Critic Wood Soanes’ summation was: “It is unbelievably bad in every department.”

Many critics compared the film to Skyscraper Souls, which had been released earlier in the year and also featured the intertwined plotlines of characters who work in a skyscraper. Manhattan Tower also received comparisons to Grand Hotel.
