= Ethel Doherty =

American screenwriter

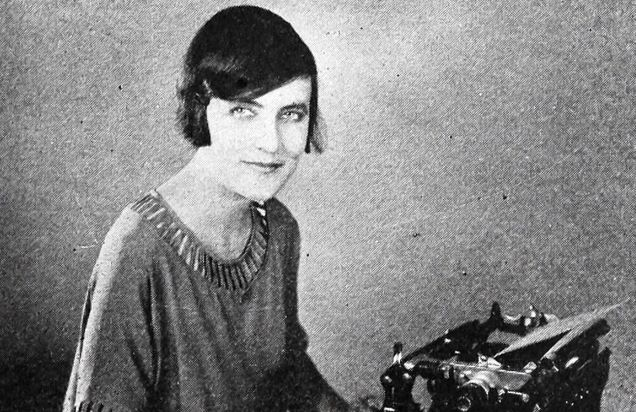
- From a 1925 magazine
- Born: Ethel Lucille Doherty; February 2, 1889; Los Angeles, California, US
- Died: August 12, 1974 (aged 85); San Diego, California, US
- Occupations: Screenwriter, author, educator, film editor

Ethel Doherty (February 2, 1889 – August 12, 1974) was an American screenwriter, writer, and educator active primarily in the 1920s and 1930s.

== Biography ==
Doherty, a native of Los Angeles County, was the daughter of Alonzo Doherty (a dentist) and Sara Armsden; she spent time in California and Arizona as a child.

She began working as a history teacher in Los Angeles public schools, but by night she busied herself writing scenarios and screenplays with her friend Louise Long, who she met while attending the University of Southern California.

Frustrated with their lack of success at selling their stories, they taught themselves shorthand and stenography and got jobs at Paramount (then Famous Players–Lasky). At night, they'd spend their time learning how to edit films.

They eventually worked their way into editing roles at Paramount Pictures, making $15 a week, before moving into screenwriting at $450 a week. Doherty's first big picture was the screen adaptation of Zane Gray's The Vanishing American in 1925. Doherty and Long worked on a number of scripts together over the courses of their careers, although they also wrote many screenplays on their own.

They worked steadily in film through the late 1930s before deciding to turn their interests to writing magazines and novels (including 1938's The Seeds of Time). The two continued to live and work together in Laguna Beach.

== Selected filmography ==
- The Vanishing American (1925)
- Behind the Front (1926)
- Mantrap (1926)
- Stranded in Paris (1926)
- Rough House Rosie (1927)
- Hula (1927)
- Figures Don't Lie (1927)
- Honeymoon Hate (1927)
- The Showdown (1928) (adaptation)
- The Fifty-Fifty Girl (1928)
- Take Me Home (1928)
- His Private Life (1928)
- Manhattan Cocktail (1928)
- Marquis Preferred (1929)
- Innocents in Paris (1929)
- The River of Romance (1929)
- The Saturday Night Kid (1929)
- It Pays to Advertise (1931) (adaptation)
- Men Are Such Fools (1932) (continuity)
- Sailor Be Good (1933)
- Home on the Range (1935)
- Rocky Mountain Mystery (1935) (adaptation)
