= Natalie Kingston =

American actress (1905–1991)

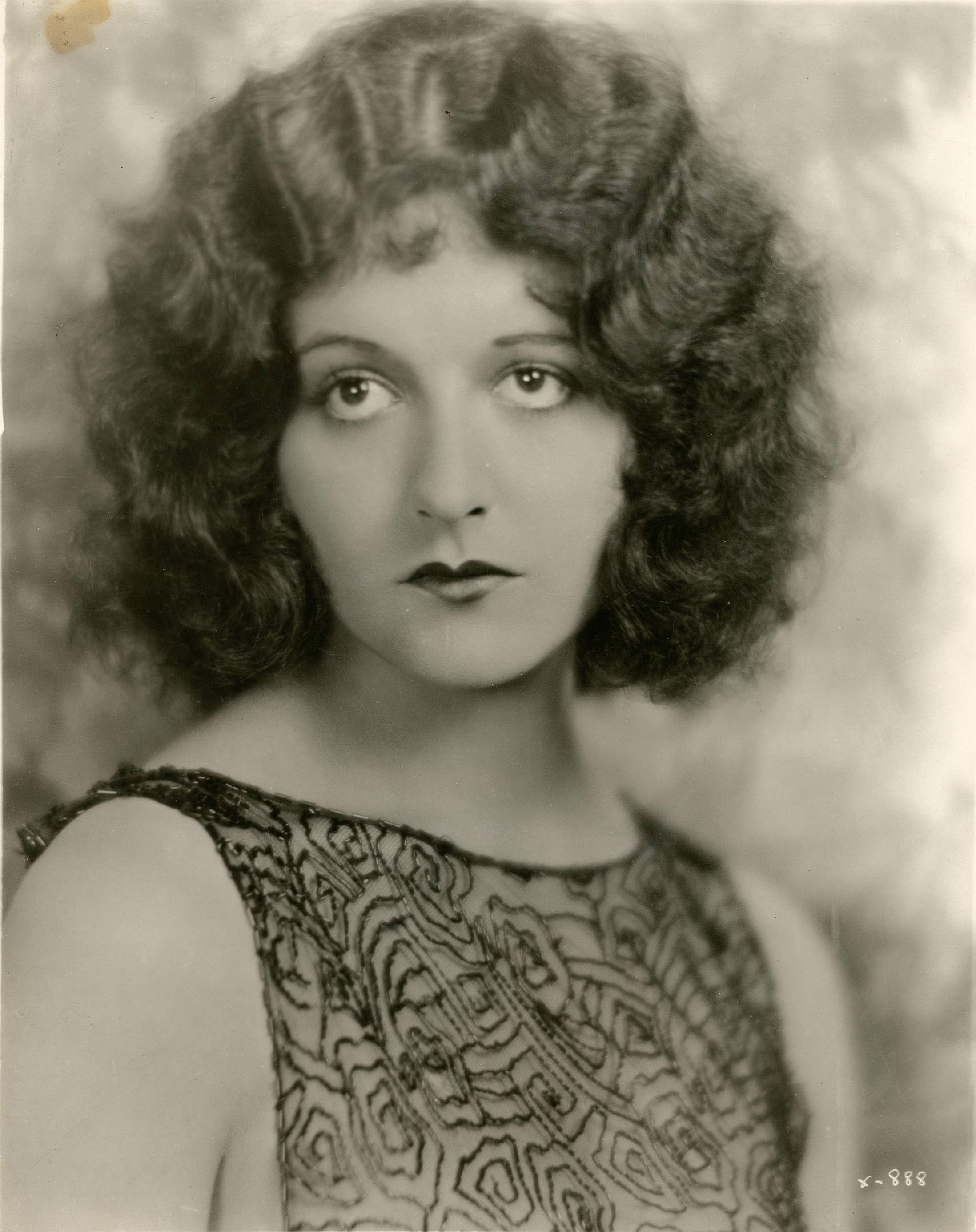
- Kingston in 1927
- Born: Natalia Ringstrom; May 19, 1905; Vallejo, California, U.S.
- Died: February 2, 1991 (aged 85); Los Angeles, California, U.S.
- Occupations: Actress, dancer
- Years active: 1920–1933
- Spouse: George J. Andersch (m. 1928; died 1960)
- Relatives: Mariano Guadalupe Vallejo (great-grandfather); Agoston Haraszthy (great-grandfather)

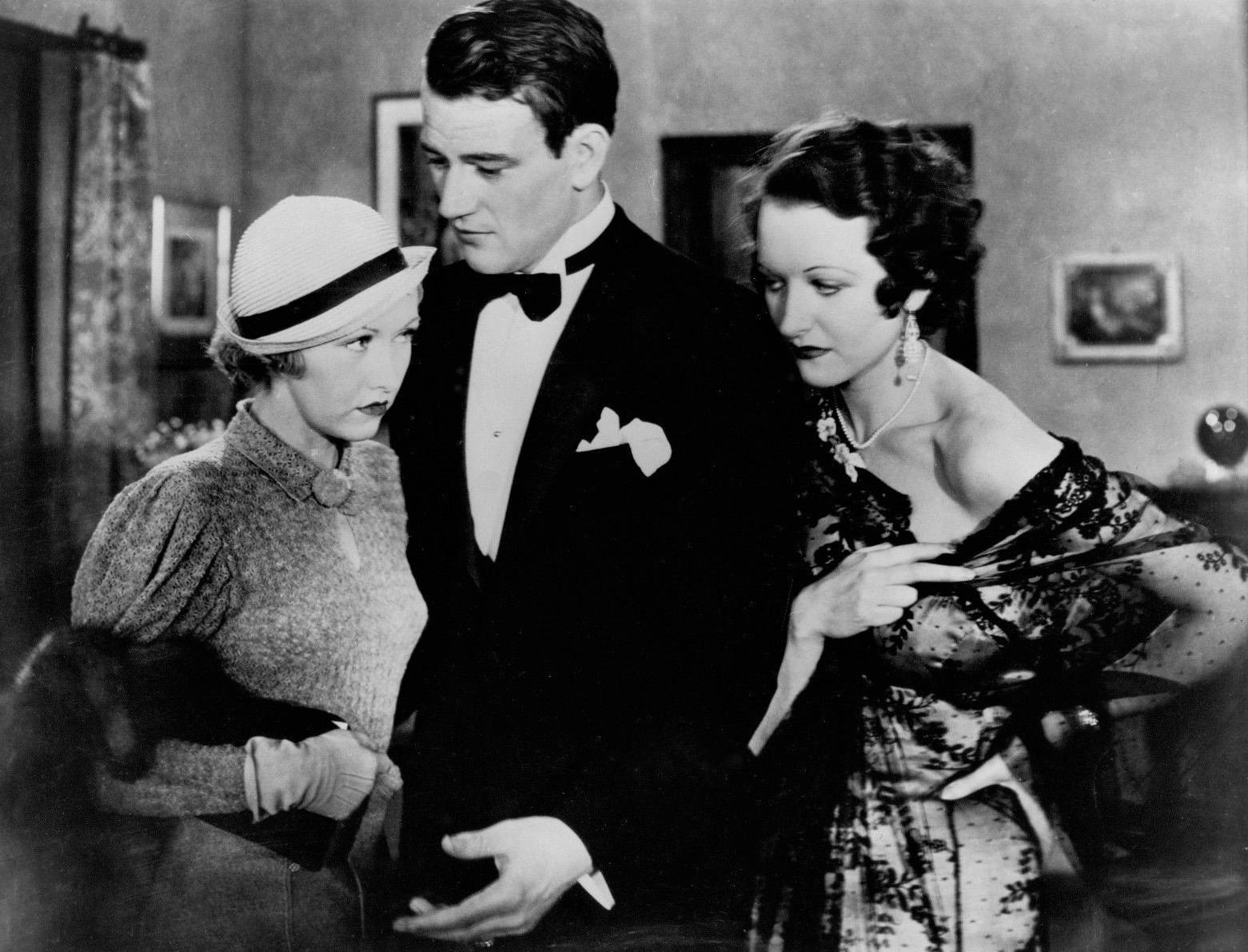
Evalyn Knapp, John Wayne, and Kingston in His Private Secretary (1933)

Natalie Kingston (born Natalia Ringstrom; May 19, 1905 – February 2, 1991) was an American actress.

== Background ==
Kingston was born as Natalia Ringstrom in Vallejo, California. She had Californio, Hungarian and Swedish ancestry and was a descendant of Mariano Guadalupe Vallejo and the Haraszthy wine family. She had a sister. Kingston was educated in San Rafael, California, at a Dominican convent.

== Actress ==
After starring in Broadway Brevities of 1920 on Broadway, she moved into films in the early 1920s. Her first movie appearance was in The Daredevil (1923). She joined the Mack Sennett studios in 1924, and co-starred with Harry Langdon in a series of comedy films including Remember When? (1925) and His First Flame (1927). Kingston left the Sennett studio and comedies in 1926 to try for dramatic movie roles. She signed with Paramount Pictures and made three motion pictures in quick succession. All three were comedies: Miss Brewster's Millions (1926), The Cat's Pajamas (1926) and Wet Paint (1926).

Kingston's first dramatic role was in Street Angel (1928). She played the part of Lisetta. The same year she made Painted Post with Tom Mix. In this film she portrayed a magazine illustrator seeking western types. She becomes caught up in an exciting feud in her search for them. As Dona Beatriz, Kingston was given a great opportunity in The Night of Love (1927). The movie starred Ronald Colman and Vilma Bánky.

She appeared in two of the popular Tarzan films. She was Mary Trevor in Tarzan the Mighty (1928) and was the fifth actress to play Jane in Tarzan the Tiger (1929), the Universal Pictures Tarzan film serial which co-starred Frank Merrill.

== Later life and death ==
In 1928, she married George J. Andersch, in Tijuana. After the marriage she was known as Natalie Vallejo Andersch. He died in 1960. She died on February 2, 1991, in the San Fernando Valley, aged 85. Her death was not widely reported at the time. She was cremated.

== Partial filmography ==
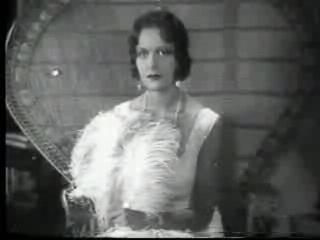
Natalie Kingston as Lady Jane in Tarzan the Tiger (1929)

- All Night Long (1924) Mack Sennett comedy, starring Harry Langdon as the boy, Natalie Kingston as the girl, Fanny Kelly as her mother and Vernon Dent as the rival.
- Feet of Mud (1924) Mack Sennett comedy, starring Harry Langdon as the boy, Natalie Kingston as the girl, Florence D Lea as her mother and Vernon Dent as the Coach.
- Wet Paint (1926) *lost film
- Lost at Sea (1926)
- Don Juan's Three Nights (1926)
- Kid Boots (1926)
- The Silent Lover (1926)
- The Night of Love (1927)
- Long Pants (1927)
- His First Flame (1927)
- Love Makes 'Em Wild (1927)
- Figures Don't Lie (1927) *lost film
- The Harvester (1927)
- Framed (1927)
- A Girl in Every Port (1928)
- The Port of Missing Girls (1928)
- Street Angel (1928)
- Tarzan the Mighty (1928) *lost film
- Painted Post (1928)
- River of Romance (1929)
- The Pirate of Panama (1929) *lost film
- Hold Your Man (1929)
- Tarzan the Tiger (1929)
- The Last of the Duanes (1930)
- Her Wedding Night (1930)
- The Swellhead (1930)
- Under Texas Skies (1930)
- His Private Secretary (1933)
- Forgotten (1933)
- Only Yesterday (1933)
