= Reggie Morris =

American actor

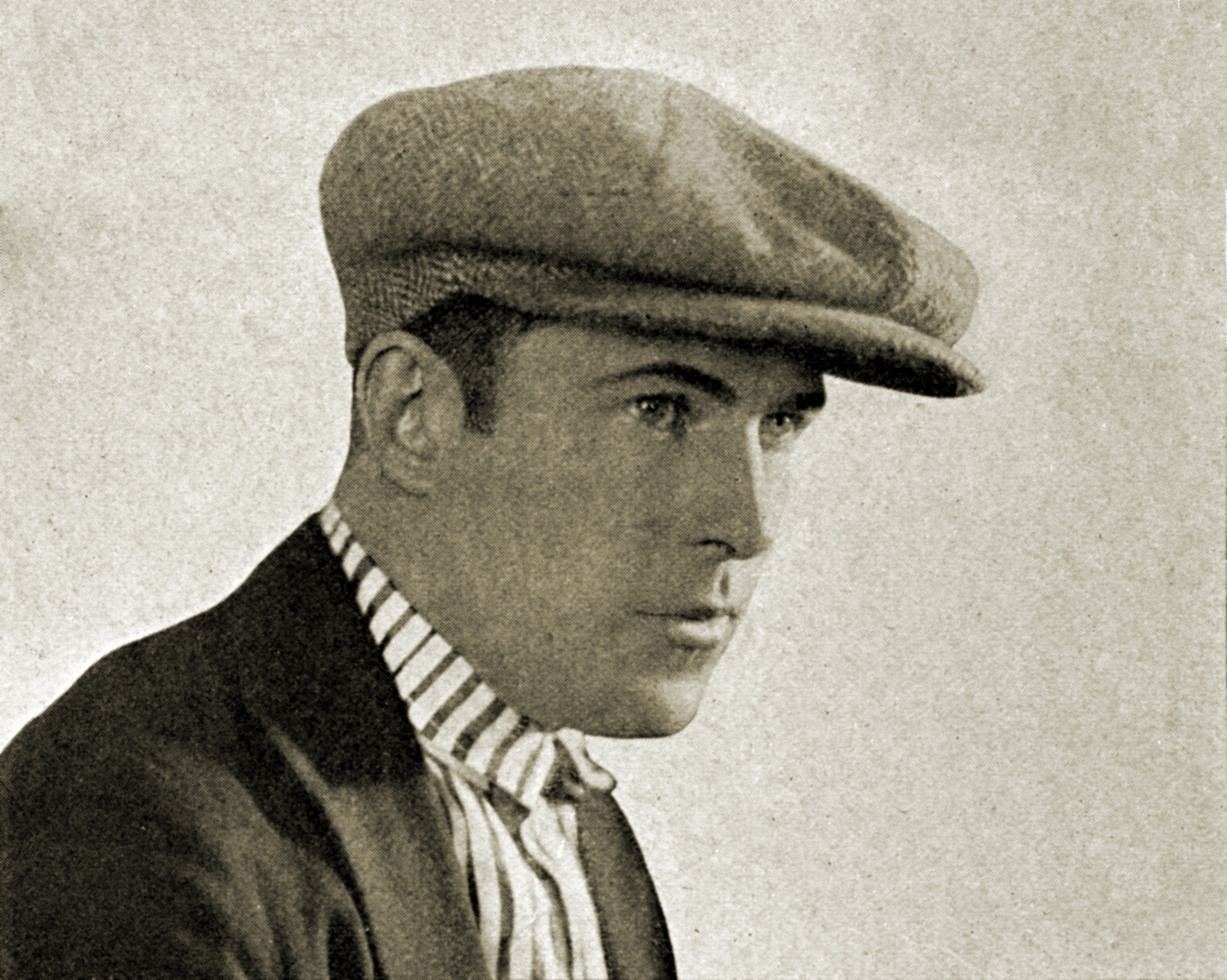
- Morris in the 1920s
- Born: James Reginald Morris; June 25, 1886; New Jersey, U.S.
- Died: February 16, 1928 (aged 41); Los Angeles, California, U.S.
- Occupation(s): Actor, director, screenwriter
- Years active: 1913–1928
- Spouse: May Repetto (1916–1923; divorced)
- Relatives: Bobby Vernon (brother-in-law)

James Reginald "Reggie" Morris (June 25, 1886 – February 16, 1928) was an American actor, director, and screenwriter of the silent era. He appeared in 46 films between 1913 and 1918. He also directed 40 films between 1917 and 1927. He was born in New Jersey.

In 1916, Morris eloped with May Repetto, a tobacco heiress from St. Louis. Repetto reportedly travelled to Los Angeles to meet Morris after seeing him in a film.

In 1928, Morris died suddenly in his bed in Los Angeles, California. His body was found by actress Linda Loredo, who was called for questioning after Morris's death.

== Selected filmography ==
- All for Science (1913)
- The Detective's Stratagem (1913)
- The Stopped Clock (1913)
- The Van Nostrand Tiara (1913)
- So Runs the Way (1913)
- The Law and His Son (1913)
- The Stolen Treaty (1913)
- A Social Cub (1916)
- Haystacks and Steeples (1916)
- The Danger Girl (1916)
- A Regular Fellow (1925 (screenplay)
- Hands Up! (1926) (story)
- Wet Paint (1926) (story)
- A Girl in Every Port (1928) (screenplay)
