= George Marion Jr. =

American screenwriter

- Born: August 30, 1899; Boston, Massachusetts, USA
- Died: February 25, 1968 (aged 68); New York, New York, USA
- Years active: 1920-1940

George Marion Jr. (August 30, 1899 – February 25, 1968) was an American screenwriter, lyricist, and librettist. He wrote for 106 films between 1920 and 1940. Director Billy Wilder told Hollywood oral historian Max Wilk that, as a title writer for silent films, Marion "was the most sought after; the producers would bring him a picture with all the scenes finished—they wouldn't even know yet whether it was a comedy, very often, or whether they had a drama—until Marion finished writing the titles!"

Marion wrote the book to the Broadway musical Too Many Girls (1940). He also wrote the lyrics for the Broadway musicals Beat the Band (1942, music by Johnny Green) and Early to Bed (1943, music by Thomas "Fats" Waller). Collaborating with Karl Farkas, Marion wrote the libretto for Hungarian composer Emmerich Kálmán's 1945 operetta Marinka.

Marion was born in Boston, Massachusetts. His father was actor and director George F. Marion.

In 1929, Marion and his wife were involved in the trial of an income-tax adviser. Both of them were witnesses in the trial of J. Marjorie Berger in U.S. District Court in Los Angeles. Marion testified that he signed his tax return without having read it. His wife testified that, at Berger's suggestion, she created two cash books that contained some fictitious entries and some true entries.

Marion died in New York, New York from a heart attack.

== Selected filmography ==
- The Wedding Song (1925)
- Mantrap (1926)
- The Bat (1926)
- The Duchess of Buffalo (1926)
- Kid Boots (1926)
- Sweet Daddies (1926)
- Camille (1926)
- The Magic Flame (1927)
- A Little Journey (1927)
- Special Delivery (1927)
- It (1927)
- Wedding Bills (1927)
- Rough House Rosie (1927)
- Underworld (1927)
- One Woman to Another (1927)
- Two Arabian Knights (1927)
- Red Hair (1928)
- Manhattan Cocktail (1928)
- Warming Up (1928)
- Ladies of the Mob (1928)
- This Is Heaven (1929)
- The Mysterious Dr. Fu Manchu (1929)
- Follow Thru (1930)
- Love Me Tonight (1932)
- The Gay Divorcee (1934)
- The Music Goes 'Round (1936)
- You Can't Cheat an Honest Man (1939)
