= Almost a Wild Man =

1913 film by Dell Henderson

- Directed by: Dell Henderson
- Written by: William Beaudine
- Production company: Biograph Company
- Distributed by: General Film Company
- Release date: June 19, 1913
- Running time: 6 minutes
- Country: Canada
- Language: Silent

Almost a Wild Man is a 1913 Canadian silent short black and white film directed by Dell Henderson, written by William Beaudine and starring Dorothy Gish.

== Cast ==
- Charles Murray as McDoo
- Gus Pixley as The Wild Man
- Edward Dillon as Rooly, Pooly, Dooly
- Clarence L. Barr as Guppy (of Guppy and Fugg)
- Bud Duncan as Fugg (of Guppy and Fugg) / Sideshow Patron
- Kathleen Butler as Actress in The Rise & Fall of McDoo
- Florence Lee as Actress in The Rise & Fall of McDoo
- Dorothy Gish as Miss Smart / Sideshow Patron
- William J. Butler as Policeman / In Audience
- Gertrude Bambrick as Member of Lizzy and Her Dancing Girls Troupe / Blackface Sideshow Patron
- Viola Barry as In Audience
- Lionel Barrymore as In Audience
- George Beranger as In Audience
- Adelaide Bronti as In Audience
- Christy Cabanne as In Audience
- William A. Carroll as In Audience
- Nan Christy as Member of Lizzy and Her Dancing Girls Troupe
- John T. Dillon as In Audience
- Charles Gorman as At Stage Door / Sideshow Patron
- Harry Hyde as In Audience
- J. Jiquel Lanoe as In Audience
- Jennie Lee as In Audience
- Adolph Lestina as In Audience
- Charles Hill Mailes as In Audience
- Alfred Paget as In Audience
- W.C. Robinson as In Audience
- Kate Toncray as In Audience
