= The House of Darkness =

1913 film directed by D. W. Griffith

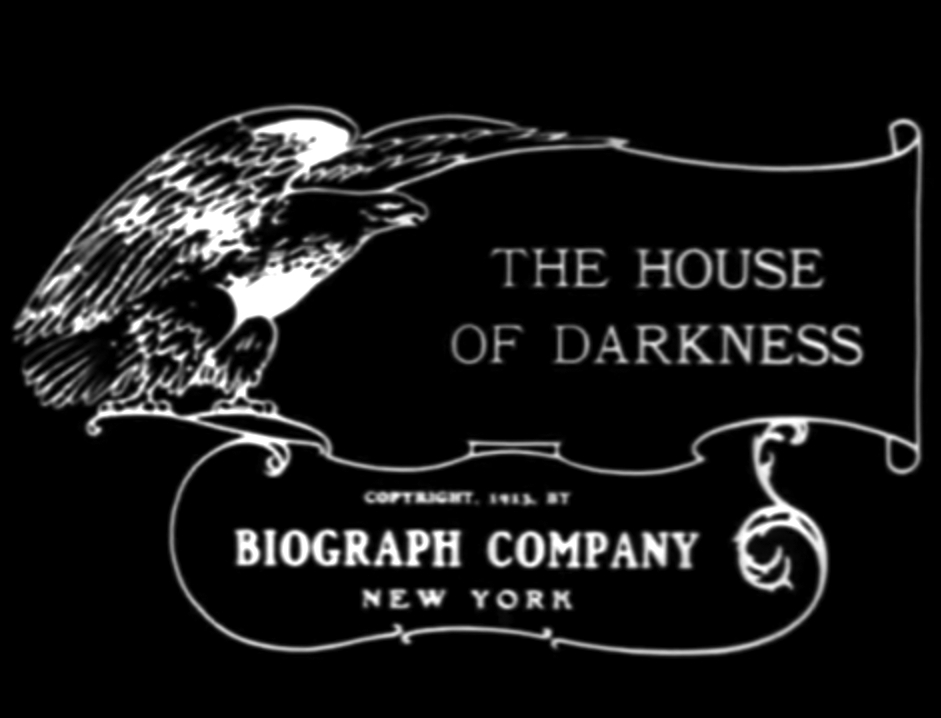
- Title card
- Directed by: D. W. Griffith
- Written by: Jere F. Looney
- Starring: Lionel Barrymore
- Cinematography: G. W. Bitzer
- Distributed by: Biograph Company
- Release date: May 10, 1913 (U.S.)
- Running time: 14-15 minutes (original film length 1000 feet)
- Country: United States
- Language: Silent (English intertitles)

The House of Darkness is a 1913 American short drama film directed by D. W. Griffith.

== Plot ==
In the introduction a woman is shown descending into insanity after having lost her baby. As she mourns, she takes a blanket from the baby's cradle and starts rocking it as if it were her deceased child. This serves as an introduction to what kind of individuals that reside at the mental institution. The doctor at the hospital is also introduced as he proposes to a nurse.

The remainder of the film takes place at the aforementioned setting which hosts several unstable individuals. When violence erupts between two patients, one of them (played by Charles Hill Mailes) escapes the scene in an attempt to avoid capture. At the climax of the chase, the patient is ultimately soothed by the music emitting from a piano in the main hospital building (Lillian Gish in a minor role) and lets himself be taken away by the guards. As he is removed from the vicinity of the music, he once again becomes violent and escapes the grasp of his attendants. After having come upon a gun he makes his way towards the house of the doctor's wife (during this sequence, the perhaps most interesting part of the film seen out of a technical perspective takes place as the lunatic sticks his head out in front of the camera from behind a tree). When the woman discovers him, she becomes terrified. During the farce, the wife puts her hands on the piano by accident, creating a sound which appears pleasing to the lunatic. He urges her to continue, using the gun as a tool of persuasion. She proceeds with the playing which ultimately results in him leaving the house and once again welcomes capture.

The film ends informing the viewer on how music becomes an integral part in aiding mentally unstable individuals.

== Cast ==
- Lionel Barrymore as the doctor
- Claire McDowell as the doctor's wife
- Charles Hill Mailes as the lunatic
- Lillian Gish as nurse playing piano
- Dorothy Bernard (unconfirmed)
- Adelaide Bronti as in tenement apartment
- Kate Bruce as a patient
- William J. Butler as extra
- W. Christy Cabanne as attack victim
- William Elmer as asylum guard
- Robert Harron as asylum guard
- Adolph Lestina as a patient
- Joseph McDermott as asylum guard / searcher
- Walter Miller as a clerk
- Frank Opperman as a patient / a clerk
- Alfred Paget as asylum guard
- W.C. Robinson as asylum guard
- Henry B. Walthall

== See also ==
- D. W. Griffith filmography
- Lillian Gish filmography
- Lionel Barrymore filmography
