= Adelaide Bronti =

American actor

Adelaide Bronti was an American actor who appeared in 1900s theatre with The Beggar Prince Opera company and in films throughout the 1910s, primarily with the Biograph Company and the Lubin Manufacturing Company. Her theatre roles saw her frequently perform opera with her contralto voice, for which she was highly praised.

== Career ==
Born in Utica, New York, Bronti's early theatre roles saw her act as a member of The Beggar Prince Opera company. The 1907 production of Foxy Mr. Bowser noted Bronti's "beautiful alto voice" and commended her "portrayal of a strong-spirited woman and her well-cultivated musical voice". Throughout her early appearances, she was primarily used in minor parts for her contralto voice in opera-related scenes and choruses. Her first major theatre role that went beyond just her singing was in the role of Aurora for 1907's Girofle-Girofla, as noted by the Arkansas Democrat.

Beginning in 1913, Bronti joined the Biograph Company to begin starring in films, while also occasionally performing in productions with the Universal Film Manufacturing Company and the American Film Manufacturing Company. She then became a part of the Lubin Manufacturing Company in 1915 and had roles in a large number of the company's silent films.

She appeared in films directed by D. W. Griffith, Harry A. Pollard, Edward Sloman, and Wilbert Melville.

== Theatre ==
- Kismet (1906) as Radamis, the Sultana
- Fra Diavolo (1907) as the Inn Keeper (Fra Diavolo (opera))
- Foxy Mr. Bowser (1907)
- Girofle-Girofla (1907) as Aurora (Giroflé-Girofla)
- Said Pasha (1907) as the Rajah's daughter
- The Beggar Prince (1907)

== Films ==
- The House of Darkness (1913), directed by D.W. Griffith (1913)
- His Mother's Son, directed by D.W. Griffith (1913)
- Almost a Wild Man (1913), directed by Dell Henderson (1913)
- Her Mother's Oath (1913) as Churchgoer
- Thou Shalt Not Kill (1913) directed by Hal Reid
- The Lesson the Children Taught, directed by Edwin August (1913)
- Withering Roses (1914)
- Bess, the Outcast, directed by Harry A. Pollard – short film (1914)
- Sally's Elopement (1914) as Her Ma
- The Wife, directed by Harry A. Pollard – short film (1914)
- The Sacrifice, directed by Harry A. Pollard – short film (1914)
- Mlle. La Mode, directed by Harry A. Pollard – short film (1914)
- The Man Who Came Back, directed by Henry Harrison Lewis – short film (1914)
- In the Footprints of Mozart (1914) as the poor neighbor
- Almost a Wild Man (1913)
- The House of Darkness (1913)
- Withering Roses (1914) as The Maid
- The Dream Dance (1915) as Her Mother
- A House of Cards (1915)
- The Dead Soul (1915)
- Nell of the Dance Hall (1915)
- The Strange Unknown (1915)
- A Night in Old Spain (1915)
- Meg of the Cliffs (1915)
- The Legend of the Poisoned Pool, directed by Edward Sloman (1915)
- The Inner Chamber, directed by Wilbert Melville (1915)
- Saved from the Harem, directed by Wilbert Melville (1915)
- Vengeance of the Oppressed, directed by Edward Sloman (1916)
- The Bond Within (1916)
- The Law's Injustice (1916) as Mrs. Morris
- Two News Items (1916)
- The Embodied Thought (1916)
- The Diamond Thieves, directed by Wilbert Melville (1916)
- Sold to Satan (1916) as Ashton's sister
- The Redemption of Helene, directed by Edward Sloman (1916)
- Soldiers' Sons, directed by Wilbert Melville (1916)
- The Gulf Between (1916), directed by Edward Sloman – short film (1916)
- A Sister to Cain, directed by Edward Sloman (1916)
- The Scarlet Chastity, directed by Wilbert Melville (1916)
- Playthings of the Gods (1916)
- The Wheat and the Chaff (1916)
- Jackstraws (1916)
- The Scapegrace (1916)
- The Return of John Boston (1916)
- The Rough Neck, directed by Melvin Mayo (1916)
- Their Mother
- A Lesson in Labor, directed by Paul Powell (1916)
- None So Blind (1916)
- The Embodied Thought (1916)
- His Majesty Plays (1916)
