= Gus Pixley =

American actor

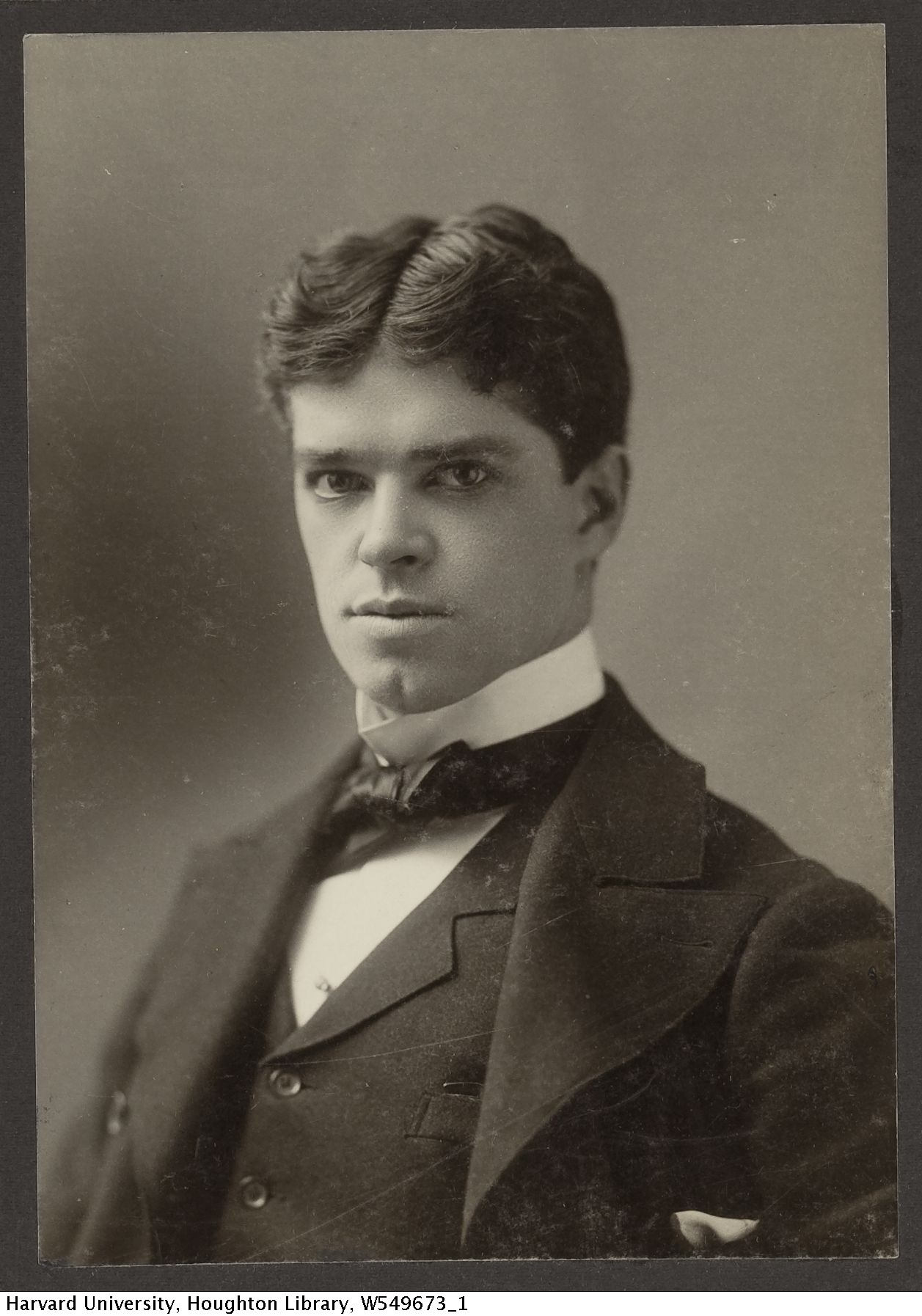
- Cabinet card, c. 1890
- Born: 1873
- Died: June 2, 1923 (aged 49); Saranac Lake, New York, US
- Years active: 1910–1921

Gus Pixley (1873 – June 2, 1923) was an American actor-singer and comic on the theatre stage, and an actor of the silent era. He appeared in burlesque, vaudeville, and minstrelsy with "America's greatest female impersonator," Burton Stanley. They toured widely with Emerson's Minstrels in the United States and Australia in the 1880s and 1890s. Pixley was on Broadway and toured America in Victor Herbert's musical Babes In Toyland as the character "Inspector Marmaduke." Pixley appeared in more than 130 films between 1910 and 1921. He died in Saranac Lake, New York, on June 2, 1923, at age 49.

== Partial filmography ==
- For His Son (1912 short) (uncredited)
- The Transformation of Mike (1912 short)
- So Near, Yet So Far (1912 short)
- At Coney Island (1912 short)
- Brutality (1912 short)
- My Hero (1912 short) (unconfirmed)
- The Water Nymph (1912)
- The Mothering Heart (1913 short) (uncredited)
- Almost a Wild Man (1913)
- Lord Chumley (1914 short)
- The Girl from Porcupine (1921)
