= Madge Kirby =

English-born American actress

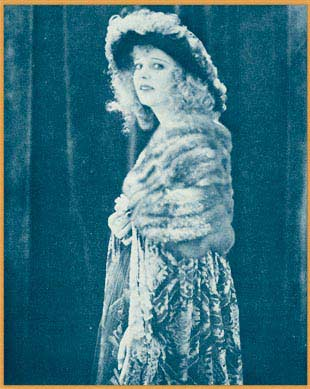
Publicity photo of Madge Kirby, 1920

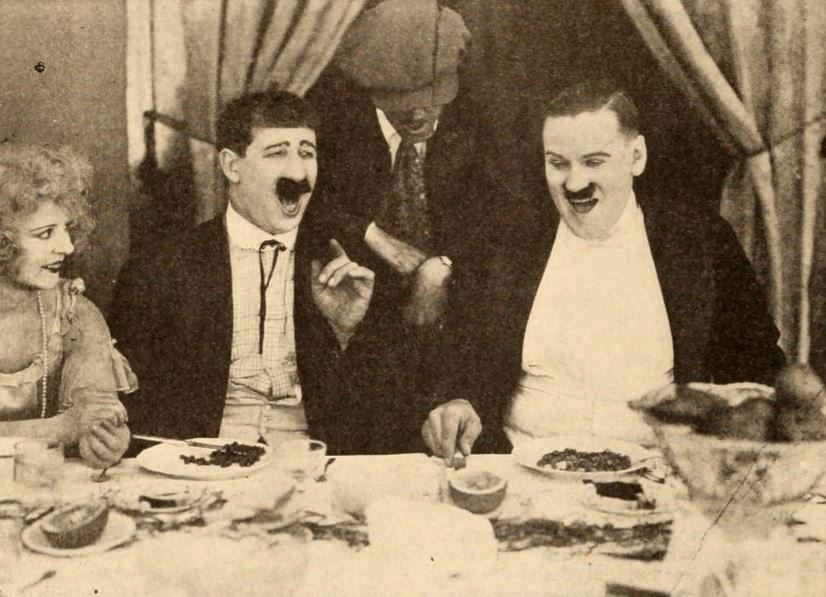
In When Spirits Move

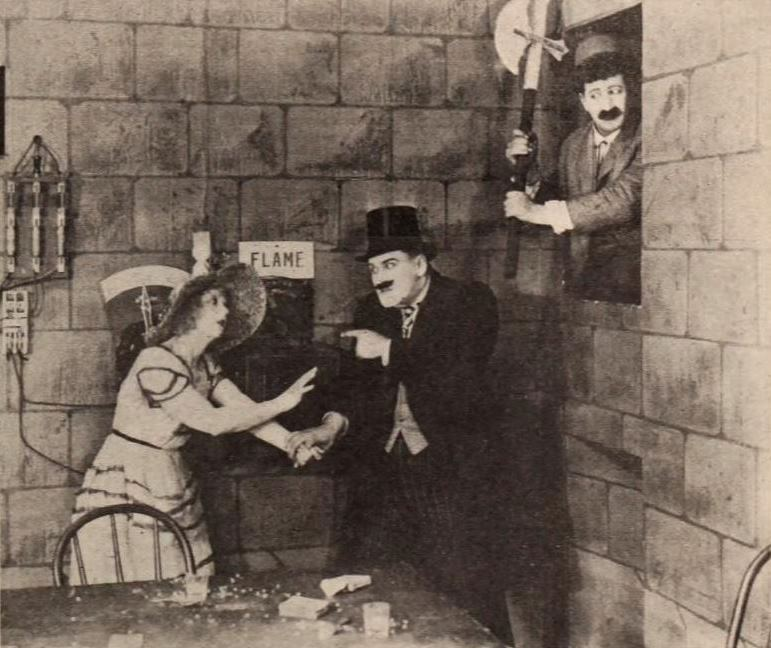
In Mystic Mash

Madge Kirby (born Madge Whitehead; April 12, 1884 – July 11, 1956) was an actress in silent film comedies. She co-starred in Dunces and Dangers and had roles in D. W. Griffith films. She also starred opposite Hank Mann in various comedies.

Kirby immigrated with her family to the U.S. from London in 1894. Her maiden name was Whitehead. She often wore a blonde wig on screen. She began acting on stage at age 14, becoming an ingenue. She later performed in vaudeville. She acted in films for Biograph Studio, American Film Company, and Fox Film Corporation.

Kirby died July 11, 1956.

== Filmography ==
- My Baby (film) (1912)
- Heredity (film) (1912), as an American Indian mother
- The New York Hat (1912)
- The Painted Lady (1912)
- Brutality (film) (1912)
- The Burglar's Dilemma (1912)
- The One She Loved (1912)
- The Musketeers of Pig Alley (1912)
- The Telephone Girl and the Lady (1913)
- Soapsuds and Sapheads (1913)
- Bears and Bad Men (1918)
- Huns and Hyphens (1918)
- Frauds and Frenzies (1918)
- The Flash of Fate (1918)
- Dunces and Dangers (1918)
- Skids and Scalawags (1918)
- J-U-N-K (1920)
