= None So Blind =

None So Blind may refer to:

- None So Blind (1916 film), an American silent feature film
- None So Blind (1923 film), an American silent drama film
- None So Blind (short story), a science fiction short story by Joe Haldeman
