= The New York Hat =

1912 film

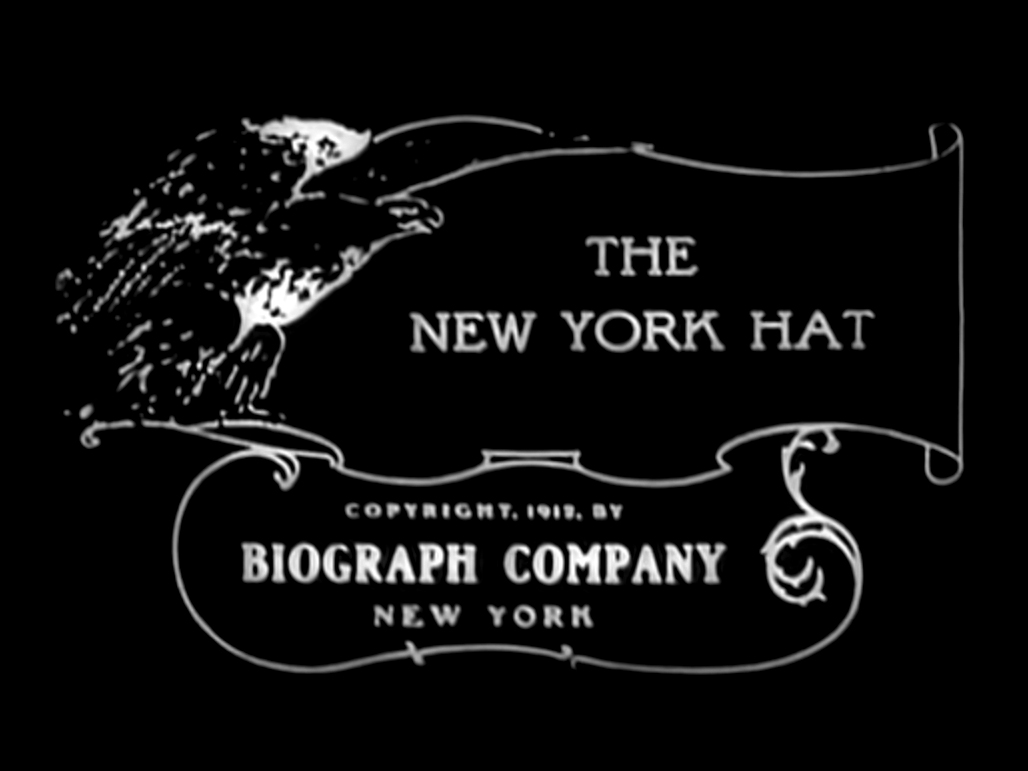
- Title card
- Directed by: D. W. Griffith
- Written by: Anita Loos; Frances Marion
- Produced by: Biograph
- Starring: Mary Pickford; Lionel Barrymore; Kate Bruce; Charles Hill Mailes; Alfred Paget; Lillian Gish
- Cinematography: G.W. Bitzer
- Music by: Robert Israel (new score)
- Distributed by: Biograph
- Release date: December 5, 1912
- Running time: 16 minutes
- Country: United States
- Language: Silent (English intertitles)

The New York Hat is a silent short film which was released in 1912, directed by D. W. Griffith from a screenplay by Anita Loos, and starring Mary Pickford, Lionel Barrymore, and Lillian Gish.

Full movie

== Plot ==
Mollie Goodhue leads a cheerless, impoverished life, largely because of her stern, miserly father. Mrs. Goodhue is mortally ill, but before dying, she gives the minister, Preacher Bolton, some money with which to buy her daughter the "finery" her father always forbade her.

Mollie is delighted when the minister presents her with a fashionable New York hat she has been longing for, but village gossips misinterpret the minister's intentions and spread malicious rumors. Mollie becomes a social pariah, and her father tears up the beloved hat in a rage.

All ends well, however, after the minister produces a letter from Mollie's mother about the money she left the minister to spend on Mollie. Soon afterwards, he proposes to Mollie, who accepts his offer of marriage.

== Cast ==
- Mary Pickford as Miss Mollie Harding (the girl)
- Charles Hill Mailes as Mr. Harding (her father)
- Kate Bruce as Mrs. Harding (her mother)
- Lionel Barrymore as Preacher Bolton (minister)
- Alfred Paget as The Doctor
- Claire McDowell as First Gossip
- Mae Marsh as Second Gossip
- Clara T. Bracy as Third Gossip
- Madge Kirby as Shopkeeper/At Mother's Deathbed
- Lillian Gish as Customer in Shop/Outside Church
- Jack Pickford as Youth outside church
- Robert Harron as Youth outside church
- Gertrude Bambrick as In Shop/Outside Church (uncredited)
- Kathleen Butler as Windowshopper (uncredited)
- John T. Dillon as Church Board Member (uncredited)
- James Kirkwood as Undetermined Role (uncredited)
- Adolph Lestina as Church Board Member (uncredited)
- Walter P. Lewis as Church Board Member (uncredited)
- Marguerite Marsh as Windowshopper (uncredited)
- W. C. Robinson as In Shop (uncredited)
- Dorothy Gish (uncredited)
- Mack Sennett (uncredited)

== Production ==
The New York Hat is one of the most notable of the Biograph Studios short films and is perhaps the best known example of Pickford's early work, and an example of Anita Loos' witty writing. The film was made by Biograph when it and many other early U.S. movie studios were based in Fort Lee, New Jersey at the beginning of the 20th century.

== See also ==
- D. W. Griffith filmography
- Lillian Gish filmography
- Lionel Barrymore filmography
