= Tol'able David =

1921 film

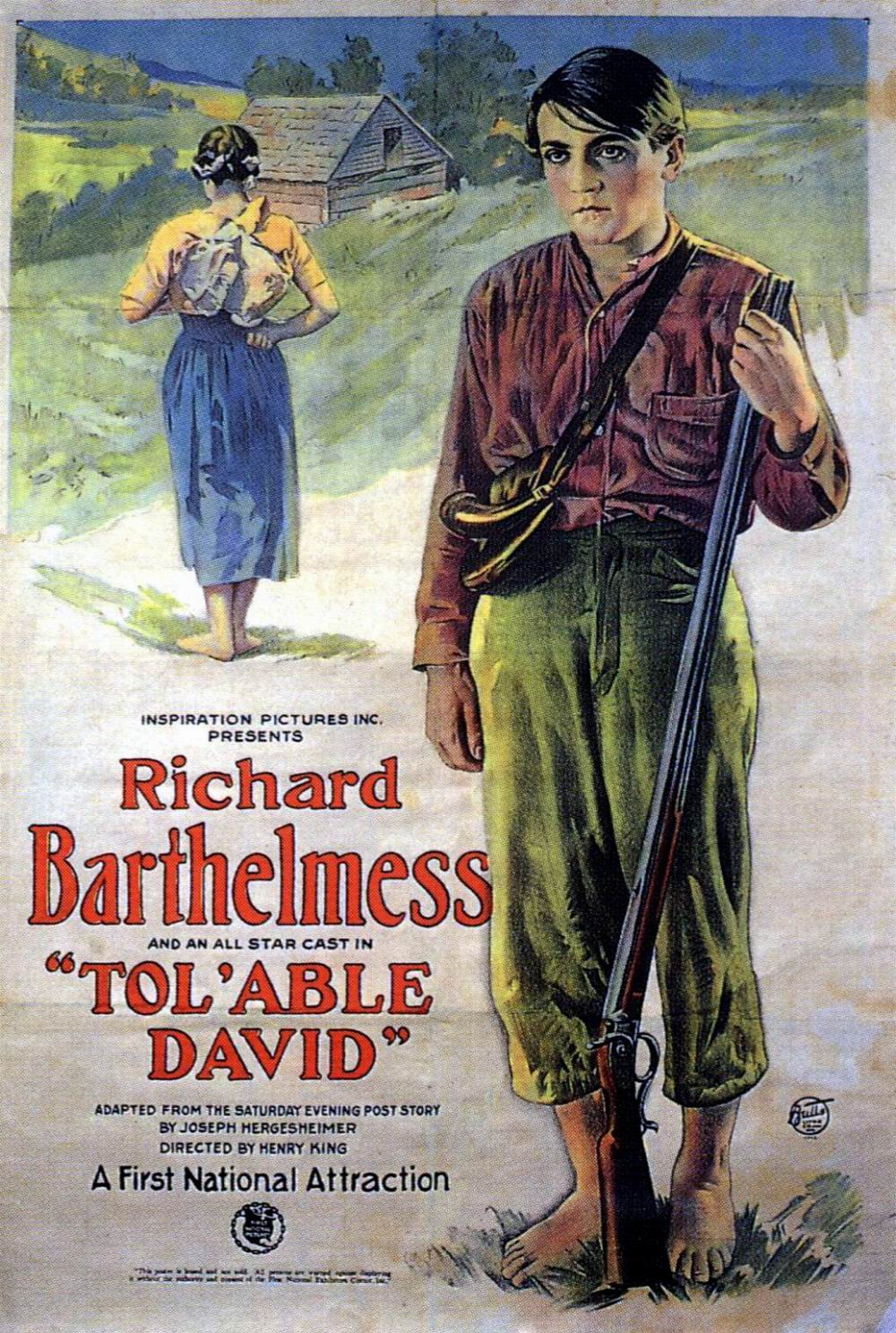
- Theatrical release poster
- Directed by: Henry King
- Written by: Edmund Goulding; Henry King
- Based on: "Tol'able David" (1917) by Joseph Hergesheimer
- Produced by: Henry King
- Starring: Richard Barthelmess; Gladys Hulette; Walter P. Lewis; Ernest Torrence
- Cinematography: Henry Cronjager
- Edited by: W. Duncan Mansfield
- Production company: Inspiration Pictures
- Distributed by: Associated First National
- Release date: November 21, 1921 (U.S.)
- Running time: 99 minutes
- Country: United States
- Language: Silent (English intertitles)
- Budget: $86,000

Tol'able David.

Tol'able David is a 1921 American silent film based on the 1917 Joseph Hergesheimer short story of the same name. It was adapted to the screen by Edmund Goulding and directed by Henry King for Inspiration Pictures. A rustic tale of violence set in the Allegheny Mountains of eastern West Virginia, it was filmed in Blue Grass, Virginia, with some locals featured in minor roles.

A major box office success, the acclaimed film was voted the 1921 Photoplay Magazine Medal of Honor and is seen by critics and film historians as one of the classics of silent film. It was selected in 2007 for preservation in the United States National Film Registry by the Library of Congress; films selected are judged to be "culturally, historically, or aesthetically significant".

== Plot ==
David Kinemon, youngest son of West Virginia tenant farmers, longs to be treated like a man by his family and neighbors, especially Esther Hatburn, the pretty girl who lives with her grandfather on a nearby farm. However, he is continually reminded that he is still a boy, "tol'able" enough, but no man.

David eventually gets a chance to prove himself when outlaw Iscah Hatburn and his sons Luke and "Little Buzzard", distant cousins of the Kinemons' Hatburn neighbors, move into the Hatburn farm, against the will of Esther and her grandfather. Esther initially tells David not to interfere, saying he is no match for her cousins. Later, the cousins kill David's pet dog and cripple his older brother while the latter is delivering mail and taking passengers to town in his Hackney carriage. Out of a sense of honor, David's father intends to visit vigilante justice on the Hatburns' cousins rather than rely on the local sheriff, but is prevented by an abrupt and fatal heart attack. David is determined to go after the Hatburns in his father's place, but his mother pleads with him, arguing that he will surely die and that with his father dead and brother crippled, the household, including his brother's wife and infant son, depends on him.

The now fatherless Kinemon family is turned out of the farm and is forced to move into a small house in town. David asks for his brother's old job of driving the hack, but is told he is too young. However, he finds work at the general store. Later, when the hack's regular driver is fired for drunkenness, David finally has a chance to drive the hack. He loses the mailbag near the Hatburn farm, where it is found by Luke. David goes to the Hatburn farm to demand the mailbag. He is refused and gets into an argument with the cousins, during which he is shot in the arm. David then shoots Iscah and the younger son and later, after a prolonged fight with the older brother (meant to recall the story of David and Goliath), emerges victorious. Esther flees for help and makes it to the village, telling that David has been killed. As a crowd prepares to go look for David, he arrives in the hack with the bag of mail, badly injured, and collapses. It is clear to all that David, no longer merely "tol'able", is a real man and a hero.

== Cast ==
- Richard Barthelmess as David Kinemon
- Gladys Hulette as Esther Hatburn
- Walter P. Lewis as Iscah Hatburn
- Ernest Torrence as Luke Hatburn
- Ralph Yearsley as Saul "Little Buzzard" Hatburn
- Forrest Robinson as Grandpa Hatburn
- Laurence Eddinger as Senator John Gault
- Marion Abbott as Mother Kinemon
- Edmund Gurney as Father Hunter Kinemon
- Warner Richmond as Allen Kinemon
- Patterson Dial as Rose Kinemon
- Henry Hallam as The Doctor

== Production ==
Director King had been born and raised not far away in rural western Virginia and took immense pleasure in scouting locations in preparation for the film.

Joseph Hergesheimer's short story had been optioned by D.W. Griffith who intended Barthelmess as the star of a film version. But, according to film historian William K. Everson, "Griffith was not anxious to film it right away; certainly not so soon after the similar Way Down East, which also starred Barthelmess. Nor could he afford to keep Bathelmess on his payroll at this economic low point in his (Griffith's) career. So when Barthelmess, anxious to set up his own company, offered to buy the property from Griffith, the director acquiesced willingly."

== Reception ==
Released in December 1921, Tol'able David was both a commercial and critical success. Carl Sandburg, reviewing the picture for the Chicago Daily News, repeatedly referred to it as a masterpiece. In Life, Robert E. Sherwood wrote "It is the first motion picture to achieve real greatness without placing any reliance on spectacular effect."

Trade-related publications widely recommended it. In Photoplay it was called a masterpiece again and "one of the few film tragedies of uncompromising power". Variety wrote that Barthelmess' performance came "close to being the best effort he has ever made". The review in Motion Picture News gave the opinion that there would be "few who will not feel the power of it". The Exhibitors Herald found it "a superb piece of cinema craftsmanship" and "excellent throughout".

In a 1924 interview for Photoplay, Mary Pickford named it among her favorite films, saying "When I first saw this picture, I felt I was not looking at a photoplay but was really witnessing the tragedy of a family I had known all my life." It influenced Russian director V.I. Pudovkin who used it as an exemplar in his writing.

In his 1959 book, Classics of the Silent Screen, Joe Franklin called Tol'able David, "one of those timeless pictures that seems every bit as great today as when it was made. A piece of Americana as authentic as the best of Mark Twain."

In 1963, John Ford named Tol'able David in his top 10 of favorite films.

William K. Everson's 1978 history, American Silent Film, named it, "Arugably, the best film" of its year, 1921, and noted that, "If one were foolhardy enough to try to assemble a 'Best Ten' list of 'Americana' on the screen..." its choice "would be indisputable."

In his 2008 book "Have You Seen...?": A Personal Introduction to 1,000 Films, film critic David Thomson assesses Tol'able David as "one of the most spectacular and heartfelt identifications with countryside ever managed onscreen". The cinematography "delivered countless views of country life as a version of heaven", while '"the fight is grand, prolonged, and not one to bet on". He finds its influence "in just about every [subsequent] film where revenge has rectitude" — mentioning, especially, High Noon and Straw Dogs.

== Other adaptations ==
- The Kid Brother (1927), Harold Lloyd's highly regarded comedy, had a similar plot and featured Tol'able David actor Ralph Yearsley. The Kid Brother was a reworking of The White Sheep (1924), which also loosely adapted aspects of Tol'able David.
- A less successful 1930 sound remake with Richard Cromwell in the title role was directed by John G. Blystone for Columbia.

== In popular culture ==
- A portion of the third act of the 1959 horror film The Tingler takes place in a specialty theater during a showing of Tol'able David.
