= Florence Hale =

American actress (1887–1945)

- Occupation: film actress
- Years active: 1912–1922

Florence Hale (14 May 1887 – 2 April 1945), was an American actress.

She was born in Iowa, United States and died in San Diego, California. She was married to actor and director Jay Hunt; the two had a daughter who also acted.

== Selected filmography ==
- The Black Sheep of the Family (1916)
- Oliver Twist (1922)
