= Fate (1913 film) =

1913 film

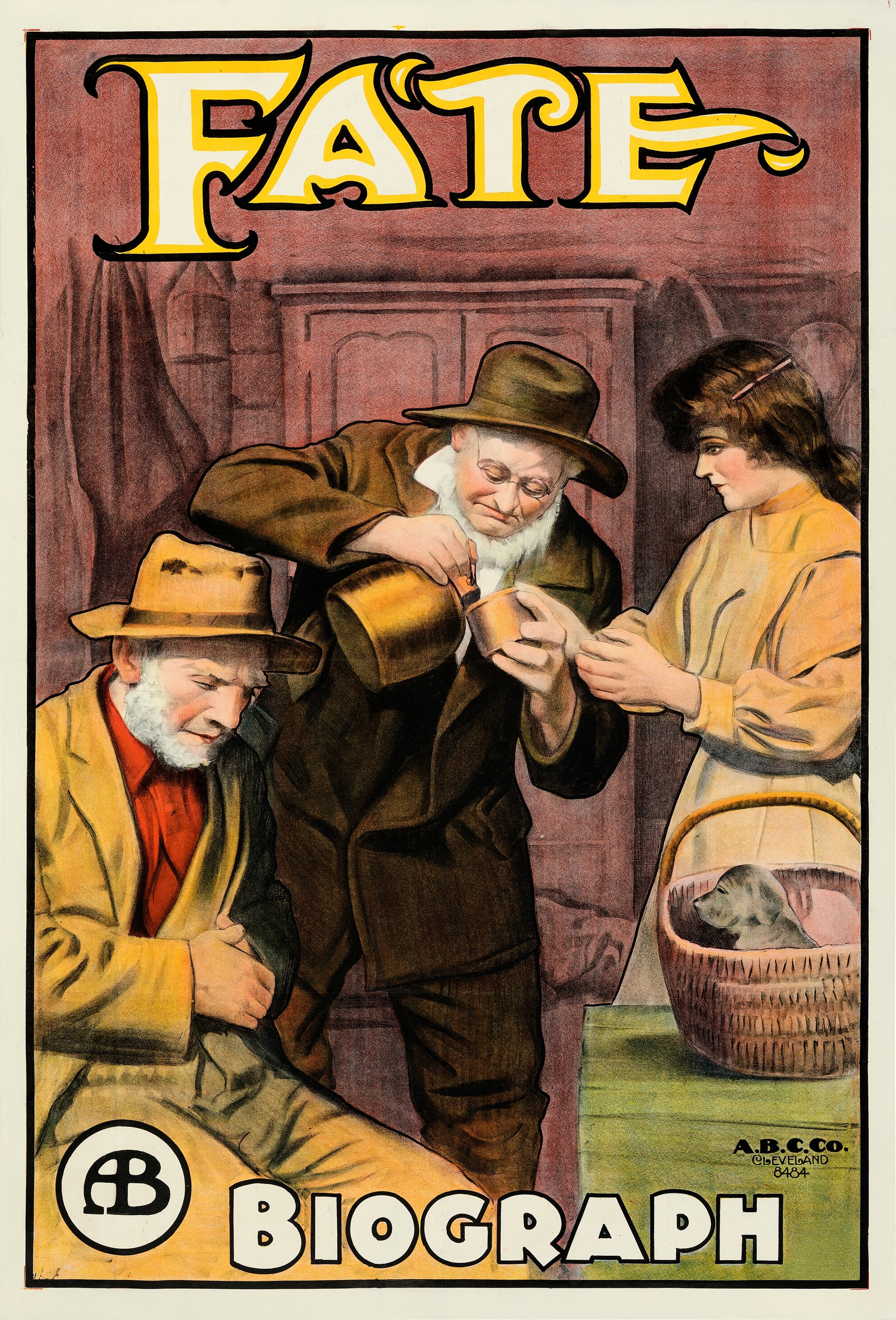
- Directed by: D. W. Griffith
- Written by: Mrs. William G. Henkels
- Produced by: Biograph Company
- Starring: Charles Hill Mailes
- Cinematography: G. W. Bitzer
- Distributed by: Biograph Company
- Release date: March 22, 1913
- Running time: 17 minutes
- Country: United States
- Language: Silent (English intertitles)

Fate is a 1913 silent short film directed by D. W. Griffith and produced and distributed by the Biograph Company.

This film survives in the Library of Congress collection.

== Cast ==
- Charles Hill Mailes as Sim Sloane
- Robert Harron as the beloved son
- John T. Dillon as a friend
- Lionel Barrymore as father, loving family
- Mae Marsh as mother, loving family
- William J. Butler
- Gladys Egan as at school
- Frank Evans as in bar
- Charles Gorman as a villager
- Adolph Lestina as in bar
- Walter P. Lewis as in bar/a villager
- Joseph McDermott as a hunter
- Alfred Paget
- Jack Pickford as at school
- Mary Pickford

== See also ==
- Lionel Barrymore filmography
