= So Near, yet So Far =

1912 film

- Directed by: D. W. Griffith
- Written by: George Hennessy
- Starring: Walter Miller
- Cinematography: G. W. Bitzer
- Production company: Biograph Company
- Distributed by: General Film Company
- Release date: September 30, 1912
- Running time: 17 minutes (16 frame/s)
- Country: United States
- Language: Silent (English intertitles)

So Near, Yet So Far (1912)

So Near, yet So Far is a 1912 American silent drama film directed by D. W. Griffith and produced by the Biograph Company. Prints of the film survive in the Museum of Modern Art and Mary Pickford Institute for Film Education film archives.

== Plot ==
A young woman has a young man's frat pin. Howard, another young man, hesitantly shows interest in her as well, but she ignores him and drives off in a one-horse carriage. However, she does look back and smile. Howard runs after her, catching up as she reaches her home, but her father sends him away. Later, he sees the young woman again. His rival appears and escorts her and another young woman away.

The girl goes to visit friends in another town. Howard is going to the same place, but the rich man of the house encounters him outside and takes him to his club. He meets some of the members and gets somewhat drunk. The inebriated rich man takes Howard home and gives him a room to sleep it off. The man's wife is annoyed by his late return, but he has cleverly set back the clocks several hours, so she is not too upset.

The next morning, the inaccurate clocks make the rich man late. He rushes away without telling his wife about the guest he brought home, dropping his "purse" unnoticed. The wife also leaves hastily after greeting her friend. The young woman finds the purse, filled with money, and rushes outside, but to no avail. She goes back inside. A passing crook sees her with the money through a window. He climbs in through the open window, while a second crook waits outside. When the woman returns, he seizes her, and his friend climbs into the room too. Howard hears her screams and enters the room through the same window (his room's door being locked). One crook flees immediately, while Howard punches the other, sending him flying through the window. A policeman catches the robber. Meanwhile, the woman flees from Howard, mistaking him for one of the criminals. However, the rich man returns and introduces her to Howard. They shake hands, to Howard's great joy.

== Cast ==
- Walter Miller as Howard
- Mary Pickford as The Young Woman
- Robert Harron as The Rival / in club
- Lionel Barrymore in Club
- Elmer Booth as A Thief
- W. Christy Cabanne in club / on street
- Harry Carey as A Thief
- Courtenay Foote in club
- Florence Geneva on street
- Dorothy Gish as A Friend
- Lillian Gish as A Friend
- Adolph Lestina in club
- Charles Hill Mailes as Rich Man In Other Town
- Claire McDowell as Rich Woman In Other Town
- Antonio Moreno in club
- Gus Pixley in club
- W. C. Robinson in club
- Henry B. Walthall
- J. Waltham in club
- L. M. Wells as The Young Woman's Father (unconfirmed)
  - This is most likely Alec B. Francis as it looks like him, not Wells

== See also ==
- Harry Carey filmography
- D. W. Griffith filmography
- Lillian Gish filmography
- Lionel Barrymore filmography
