= Bud Duncan =

American actor

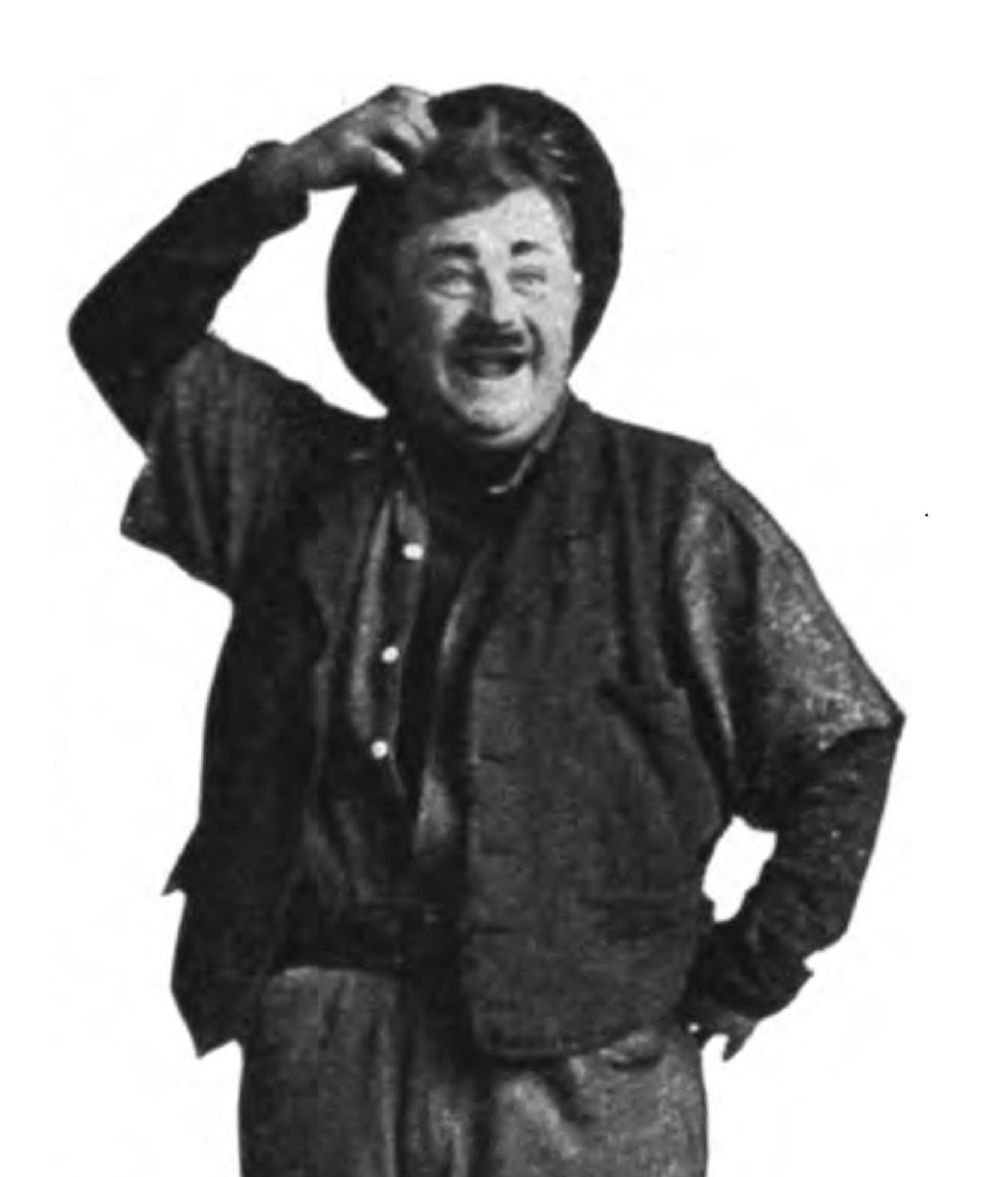
- Duncan in 1915
- Born: Albert Edward Duncan; October 31, 1883; Brooklyn, New York, US
- Died: November 25, 1960 (aged 77); Los Angeles, California, US
- Other name: Albert Edward Duncan
- Years active: 1912–1942

Albert Edward "Bud" Duncan (October 31, 1883 – November 25, 1960) was an American actor of the silent era, most known for his early work with silent film comedian Lloyd Hamilton. He appeared in more than 160 films between 1912 and 1942.

== Early life ==
Duncan was born on October 31, 1883, in Brooklyn, New York. His father was a traveling salesman and ventriloquist and Duncan joined his act at age 6. Although his father sent him to a military school, Duncan started taking on more acting roles after graduation and eventually ended up in vaudeville.

== Career ==
During his early vaudeville career, Duncan worked with vaudeville actors such as Lew Fields and Kolb and Dill. His first work in the film industry was for the Biograph Company and he later played Jeff in the Nestor Film Company's film adaptations of the Mutt and Jeff comic strips. Shortly after the Mutt and Jeff series ended, Duncan returned to vaudeville, where he first encountered Lloyd Hamilton. He and Hamilton were hired by the Kalem Company for a series of one-reelers as the comedy duo, Ham and Bud. Duncan even briefly headlined the series by himself after Hamilton broke his heel in 1915. The series ended when the Kalem Company was sold to Vitagraph in 1917 and Duncan briefly headlined another series for the Schiller Production Company called "Bud and His Buddies." Duncan also co-starred as Casper with Thelma Hill in Larry Darmour's series based on the Toots and Casper comic strips.

== Later career ==
Duncan was mainly limited to bit roles during the sound era and he largely retired from films in the early 1930s. After voicing the title character on the radio program, The Cinnamon Bear, he briefly returned to the film industry to star as Snuffy Smith in two films for Monogram Pictures in the early 1940s. Duncan died of respiratory failure on November 25, 1960, at the age of 77.

== Selected filmography ==
- Red Hicks Defies the World (1913)
- Almost a Wild Man (1913)
- A Whirlwind of Whiskers (1917)
- Maggie Pepper (1919)
- All Wet (1921)
- The Haunted Ship (1927)
- Toots and Casper (1927-1929) series, co-starred with Thelma Hill
- Riders of the Rio (1931)
- Private Snuffy Smith (1942)
- Hillbilly Blitzkrieg (1942)
