= Forged Passport =

- Theatrical release poster
- Directed by: John H. Auer
- Screenplay by: Lee Loeb; Franklin Coen
- Story by: Lee Loeb; James Webb
- Produced by: John H. Auer
- Starring: Paul Kelly; June Lang; Lyle Talbot; Billy Gilbert; Cliff Nazarro; Maurice Murphy
- Cinematography: Jack A. Marta
- Edited by: Edward Mann
- Music by: Cy Feuer; William Lava; Paul Sawtell
- Production company: Republic Pictures
- Distributed by: Republic Pictures
- Release date: April 24, 1939
- Running time: 63 minutes
- Country: United States
- Language: English

Forged Passport is a 1939 American action film directed by John H. Auer and written by Lee Loeb and Franklin Coen. The film stars Paul Kelly, June Lang, Lyle Talbot, Billy Gilbert, Cliff Nazarro and Maurice Murphy. The film was released on April 24, 1939, by Republic Pictures.

== Plot ==
Dan Frazer is a border Patrolman in the California-Mexico border with a hot temper, this indirectly leads to the death of a comrade. Dan decides to leave the force and go find his comrade's killer, who he believes is part of smuggler gang.

== Cast ==
- Paul Kelly as Dan Frazer
- June Lang as Helene
- Lyle Talbot as Jack Scott
- Billy Gilbert as Nick Mendoza
- Cliff Nazarro as 'Shakespeare'
- Maurice Murphy as 'Kansas' Nelson
- Christian Rub as Mr. Nelson
- John Hamilton as Jack Rogers aka 'Lefty'
- Dewey Robinson as Riley
- Bruce MacFarlane as Buck
- Ivan Miller as Capt. Ellis
- Frank Puglia as Chief Miguel
