= At Coney Island =

- Directed by: Mack Sennett
- Produced by: Mack Sennett
- Starring: Mack Sennett; Mabel Normand; Ford Sterling
- Cinematography: Arthur C. Miller
- Production company: Keystone Studios
- Distributed by: Mutual Film
- Release date: October 28, 1912 (United States)
- Running time: 1/2 reel
- Country: United States
- Languages: Silent; English intertitles

At Coney Island, also known as Cohen at Coney Island, is a 1912 American short silent comedy starring Mack Sennett, Mabel Normand, and Ford Sterling. Sennett also directed and produced the film. Sennett claimed this was the first Keystone Studios production, shot on location at Coney Island on July 4, 1912. It was the eleventh Keystone film released, on a split-reel with A Grocery Clerk's Romance.

There is one known surviving print, and the short has been screened in 2007 and 2012.

== Cast ==
- Mack Sennett as The Boy
- Mabel Normand as The Girl
- Ford Sterling as The Married Flirt
- Gus Pixley as The Other Rival
