= Hillbilly Blitzkrieg =

1942 film by Roy Mack

- Directed by: Roy Mack
- Written by: Billy DeBeck (comic strip "Barney Google and Snuffy Smith"); Ray Harris (screenplay); Carl Harbaugh (additional comedy development) and Glen Lambert (additional comedy development)
- Produced by: Jack Dietz (associate producer); Edward Gross (producer)
- Cinematography: Marcel Le Picard
- Edited by: Ralph Dixon
- Distributed by: Monogram Pictures
- Release date: 14 August 1942
- Running time: 63 minutes
- Country: United States
- Language: English

Hillbilly Blitzkrieg is a 1942 American comedy film directed by Roy Mack that was a sequel to Private Snuffy Smith. The film is also known as Enemy Round-Up (American TV title).

== Plot ==
German spies mistake Snuffy Smith's moonshine for a new secret rocket fuel and try to steal the "formula."

== Cast ==
- Bud Duncan as Pvt. Snuffy Smith
- Edgar Kennedy as Sgt. Homer Gatling
- Cliff Nazarro as Barney Google
- Lucien Littlefield as Prof. Waldo James
- Doris Linden as Julie James, Waldo's Daughter
- Alan Baldwin as Cpl. Jim Bruce
- Jimmie Dodd as Missouri, Army Private
- Frank Austin as Luke
- Nicolle Andre as Eliza Murdock aka Leni the Nazi
- Manart Kippen as Soldier
- Jerry Jerome as Boller, Leni's Henchman
- Jack Carr as Hertle, Leni's Henchman
- Teddy Mangean as Dinky
