= Sailors on Leave =

1941 film by Albert S. Rogell

- Theatrical release poster
- Directed by: Albert S. Rogell
- Screenplay by: Art Arthur; Malcolm Stuart Boylan
- Story by: Herbert Dalmas
- Produced by: Albert J. Cohen
- Starring: William Lundigan; Shirley Ross; Chick Chandler; Ruth Donnelly; Mae Clarke; Cliff Nazarro
- Cinematography: Ernest Miller
- Edited by: Edward Mann
- Music by: Mort Glickman
- Production company: Republic Pictures
- Distributed by: Republic Pictures
- Release date: September 30, 1941
- Running time: 71 minutes
- Country: United States
- Language: English

Sailors on Leave is a 1941 American musical comedy film directed by Albert S. Rogell and written by Art Arthur and Malcolm Stuart Boylan. The film stars William Lundigan, Shirley Ross, Chick Chandler, Ruth Donnelly, Mae Clarke and Cliff Nazarro. The film was released on September 30, 1941, by Republic Pictures.

== Plot ==
Chuck Stephens is fooled by his sailor pals Swifty and Mike into believing (and betting on) that if he marries by his 27th birthday, he will inherit $25,000. With only days to go before his deadline, a frantic Chuck is taken to Aunt Navy's nightclub in San Pedro, California and introduced to singer Linda Hall, making a bad first impression.

Linda eventually grows more interested in Chuck, but ends up arrested after a bracelet he gives her as a gift turns out to be stolen. Chuck considers marrying other women rounded up by the guys, but realizes he loves Linda after all. He marries her after the deadline, but unexpectedly gets a $5,000 reward for recovering the stolen bracelet.

== Cast ==
- William Lundigan as Chuck Stephens
- Shirley Ross as Linda Hall
- Chick Chandler as Swifty
- Ruth Donnelly as Aunt Navy
- Mae Clarke as Gwen
- Cliff Nazarro as Mike
- Tom Kennedy as Dugan
- Mary Ainslee as Sadie
- Bill Shirley as Bill Carstairs
- Garry Owen as Thompson
- William Haade as Sawyer
- Jane Kean as Sunshine

== Bibliography ==
- Fetrow, Alan G. Feature Films, 1940-1949: a United States Filmography. McFarland, 1994.
