= Dunces and Dangers =

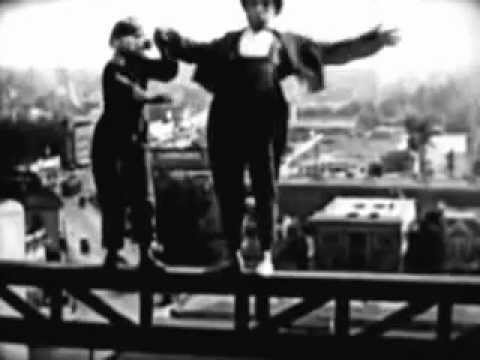
- Directed by: Larry Semon
- Written by: Larry Semon (scenario)
- Starring: Larry Semon; Madge Kirby; William Hauber
- Release date: 1918
- Running time: 1 reel (approximately 10 minutes)
- Country: United States
- Language: English

Dunces and Dangers is a 1918 American film directed by Larry Semon.

== Plot summary ==
A man and his wife are having trouble financially and barely have anything to eat. The grocer and butcher visit and, seeing that the couple cannot pay them, take things from their apartment. Next, a group of men arrive and the couple quickly lock the door to the room, put on disguises and escape to the roof though the window. After a series of incidents, they discover that the men are actually there to tell the man that he has inherited a fortune.

== Cast ==
- Larry Semon as Larry
- Madge Kirby as Larry's Wife
- William Hauber
- Owen Evans
- Pietro Aramondo
- Frank Alexander
