= The Mothering Heart =

1913 film

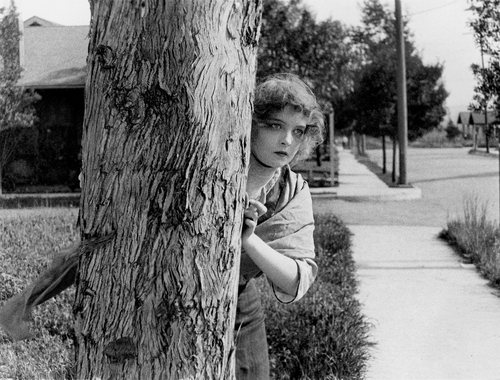
- Still from the film
- Directed by: D. W. Griffith
- Starring: Walter Miller; Lillian Gish
- Cinematography: G. W. Bitzer
- Distributed by: Biograph Company
- Release date: June 21, 1913 (U.S.)
- Running time: 23 minutes (18 frame/s)
- Country: United States
- Language: Silent (English intertitles)

The Mothering Heart (1913)

The Mothering Heart is a 1913 American short drama film directed by D. W. Griffith. A print of the film survives in the film archive of the Museum of Modern Art.

== Plot ==
A young woman tends to flowers in a garden and rescues a puppy. She is courted by a melancholic young man and agrees to marry him.

Following their marriage, the couple face financial difficulties. The wife takes in laundry to supplement their income, while her husband seeks stable employment. When he secures a well-paying job, he insists they celebrate at a restaurant featuring an Apache dance performance. The wife, dressed modestly, appears out of place among the fashionable clientele. Her husband becomes attracted to a sophisticated woman dining nearby.

The husband begins an affair with the woman, who is wealthy and travels by chauffeur. The wife, now pregnant, discovers a glove in her husband's coat pocket and follows him, confirming his infidelity. She returns to her mother's home, where she gives birth.

The affair ends when the other woman leaves the husband for a wealthier companion. The husband receives a letter from his wife informing him of the child's birth and visits her, but she refuses reconciliation.

The child becomes ill and is attended by a doctor. During another visit from her husband, the wife maintains her refusal to reconcile. While the husband sits in the garden, the child dies. The wife grieves in the same garden where the story began.

Returning indoors, she finds her husband mourning by the crib. The couple reconciles and embraces as the film concludes.

== Cast ==
- Walter Miller as Joe, the young husband
- Lillian Gish as the young wife
- Kate Bruce as young wife's mother
- Viola Barry as the idle woman
- Charles West as the new light
- Adolph Lestina as the doctor
- Jennie Lee as the wash customer
- Charles Murray as male Apache dancer
- Gertrude Bambrick as female Apache dancer
- William J. Butler as club patron
- Christy Cabanne as outside club
- Donald Crisp as undetermined role (unconfirmed)
- Josephine Crowell as woman collecting ironing
- Edward Dillon as club patron
- John T. Dillon as club patron
- William Elmer as doorman
- Dell Henderson as club patron
- Harry Hyde as outside club
- J. Jiquel Lanoe as outside club / club patron
- Charles Hill Mailes as club patron
- Mae Marsh as undetermined role (unconfirmed)
- Joseph McDermott as among waiters
- Alfred Paget as club patron
- Gus Pixley as club patron
- W. C. Robinson as club patron
- Henry B. Walthall as club patron

== See also ==
- D. W. Griffith filmography
- Lillian Gish filmography
