= Private Snuffy Smith =

1942 film by Edward F. Cline

- Directed by: Edward F. Cline
- Written by: Billy DeBeck (comic strip "Barney Google and Snuffy Smith"); John Grey (original screenplay); Jack Henley (original screenplay); Lloyd French (original screenplay); Doncho Hall (original screenplay)
- Produced by: Jack Dietz (associate producer); Edward Gross (producer); Daniel Keefe (associate producer)
- Starring: Bud Duncan; Edgar Kennedy; Sarah Padden; J. Farrell MacDonald
- Cinematography: Marcel Le Picard
- Edited by: Robert O. Crandall
- Music by: Rudy Schrager
- Production company: Monogram Pictures
- Release date: January 16, 1942
- Running time: 67 minutes
- Country: United States
- Language: English

Private Snuffy Smith (reissued as Snuffy Smith, Yardbird) is a 1942 American army comedy film directed by Edward F. Cline and starring Bud Duncan as comic-strip character Snuffy Smith and Edgar Kennedy as his commanding officer. A sequel, Hillbilly Blitzkrieg, was released later in 1942 and also featured Duncan and Kennedy. The comic strip's characters Barney Google and Sparkplug the horse do not appear in the film.

== Plot ==
Envious of the pay of $30 per month and free khaki britches and gold buttons of his friend Don Elbie, Snuffy Smith joins the U.S. Army with his dog Mr. Carson concealed by an invisibility potion. His company first sergeant is Ed Cooper, a former revenue agent who had unsuccessfully attempted to locate and destroy Snuffy's still.

Don has invented a new rangefinder that he hopes may be of use to the army. General Rosewater hopes to test the rangefinder in war games with a rival general. A pair of fifth columnists hope to steal the rangefinder but are defeated by Snuffy's wife Lowizie, his invisible dog and his hillbilly neighbors.

== Cast ==
- Bud Duncan as Snuffy Smith, Camp Yardbird
- Edgar Kennedy as 1st Sgt. Ed Cooper
- Sarah Padden as Lowizie Smith
- J. Farrell MacDonald as Gen. Rosewater
- Doris Linden as Cindy
- Jimmie Dodd as Pvt. Don Elbie
- Andria Palmer as Janie
- Patrick McVey as Lloyd
- Frank Austin as Saul

== Soundtrack ==
- "Time's a-Wastin" by Ole Olsen, Chic Johnson, Jay Livingston and Ray Evans, sung by Jimmie Dodd
- "The Yard Bird" by Jimmie Dodd, sung by Jimmie Dodd
- "I Don't Know What to Do Blues" by Jimmie Dodd, sung by Jimmie Dodd
