= Love in an Apartment Hotel =

1913 film

- Directed by: D. W. Griffith
- Written by: William M. Marston
- Starring: Blanche Sweet
- Cinematography: G. W. Bitzer
- Distributed by: Biograph Company
- Release date: February 27, 1913
- Running time: 17 minutes (16 frame/s)
- Country: United States
- Language: Silent (English intertitles)

Love in an Apartment Hotel is a 1913 American drama film directed by D. W. Griffith and starring Blanche Sweet.

== Cast ==
- Blanche Sweet as the young woman
- Adolph Lestina as the young woman's father
- Henry B. Walthall as the young woman's fiancé
- Harry Carey as the thief
- Mae Marsh as Angelina Millingford, a maid
- Edward Dillon as "Pinky" Doolan, a bellboy
- Robert Harron as the desk clerk
- Kate Toncray as head chambermaid
- Jack Pickford as a bellhop
- Clara T. Bracy as a maid
- John T. Dillon as one of the fiancé's friends
- Walter Miller as one of the fiancé's friends
- Gertrude Bambrick as in hotel lobby
- Lionel Barrymore as in hotel lobby
- Kathleen Butler as the young woman's maid
- Hattie Delaro as in hotel lobby (unconfirmed)
- Frank Evans as first hotel detective
- Harry Hyde as in hotel lobby
- J. Jiquel Lanoe as in hotel lobby
- Walter P. Lewis as in hotel lobby
- Joseph McDermott as the fiancé's valet
- W. C. Robinson as second hotel detective
- Matt Snyder as in hotel lobby (credited as Matt B. Snyder)

== Preservation ==
The film is preserved in paper print by the Library of Congress.

== See also ==
- Harry Carey filmography
- D. W. Griffith filmography
- Blanche Sweet filmography
- Lionel Barrymore filmography
