= In Old Colorado =

1941 film by Howard Bretherton

- Theatrical release poster
- Directed by: Howard Bretherton
- Screenplay by: J. Benton Cheney; Russell Hayden; Norton S. Parker
- Produced by: Harry Sherman
- Starring: William Boyd; Russell Hayden; Andy Clyde; Margaret Hayes; Morris Ankrum; Sarah Padden; Cliff Nazarro
- Cinematography: Russell Harlan
- Edited by: Carroll Lewis
- Music by: John Leipold
- Production company: Harry Sherman Productions
- Distributed by: Paramount Pictures
- Release date: March 14, 1941
- Running time: 66 minutes
- Country: United States
- Language: English

In Old Colorado is a 1941 American Western film directed by Howard Bretherton and written by J. Benton Cheney, Russell Hayden and Norton S. Parker. The film stars William Boyd, Russell Hayden, Andy Clyde, Margaret Hayes, Morris Ankrum, Sarah Padden and Cliff Nazarro. The film was released on March 14, 1941, by Paramount Pictures.

== Plot ==
Joe Weiler has instigated a conflict over water rights between two ranchers. The idea is to have the ranchers do each other in then move in and take over. Hoppy and the good guys won't let this happen.

== Cast ==
- William Boyd as Hopalong Cassidy
- Russell Hayden as Lucky Jenkins
- Andy Clyde as California Carlson
- Margaret Hayes as Myra Woods
- Morris Ankrum as Joe Weiler
- Sarah Padden as Harriet Ma Woods
- Cliff Nazarro as Nosey Haskins
- Stanley Andrews as George Davidson
- James Seay as Hank Merritt
- Morgan Wallace as Sheriff Collins
- Weldon Heyburn as Henchman Blackie
- Eddy Waller as Jim Stark
