= Clara T. Bracy =

English actress (1848–1941)

- Born: Clara Rose Hodges; 1 January 1848; London, England
- Died: 22 February 1941 (aged 93); Los Angeles, California, USA
- Occupation: Actress
- Years active: 1908–1932
- Spouse: Henry Bracy (1873–1917; his death)
- Children: Sidney Bracy, Phillip Bracy
- Parents: Edward Hodges (father); Eliza Cooper (mother)
- Relatives: Lydia Thompson (sister)

Clara T. Bracy (born Clara Rose Hodges; 1 January 1848 – 22 February 1941) was an English stage and silent film actress.

== Life and career ==
Bracy was born Clara Rose Hodges in London, England. Her father was Edward Hodges, and her mother was Eliza (née Cooper) who married 29 September 1842. Her father owned the Royal Oak Public House in London. Clara Rose had several step-siblings including actress Lydia Thompson. Clara Rose Hodges had three biological brothers who were triplets born 16 July 1844: Abraham Edward Hodges, Isaac William Hodges and Jacob George Hodges.

In September 1873, Bracy and her husband, tenor Henry Bracy, travelled to Australia to perform in Jacques Offenbach's operetta Lischen et Fritzchen at the Theatre Royal in Melbourne,

They continued in various parts in Australia before being engaged by Irish musical impresario William Saurin Lyster to lead a season of French operetta. For Lyster, they performed in operettas for five years, including in Lecocq's La fille de Madame Angot and Giroflé-Girofla. Offenbach pieces included The Grand Duchess of Gerolstein, La belle Hélène, Barbe-bleue, La Périchole, La princesse de Trébizonde and Les brigands, and Hervé's Chilpéric was given. These were followed by the first Australian production of Les cloches de Corneville. She was well received by the press. During these years, the couple took a tour of the United States in 1876. In 1880, the couple returned to Britain, where they continued to build their reputations in comic opera and operetta.

In 1888 the Bracys returned to Australia, performing in concerts and then at the Sydney Opera House for a season, conducted by Henri Kowalski, in Kowalski's Moustique, The Beggar Student In 1890, they led their own company in productions of The Sultan of Mocha, The Beggar Student, and The Lady of the Locket at the Criterion Theatre. They then joined J. C. Williamson's Royal Comic Opera Company, performing in Gilbert and Sullivan and other comic operas. The couple had two sons, one of whom, Sidney Bracy, became an actor, appearing on stage with Williamson and then in Britain and America before becoming a successful film actor. Their other son, Philip, who became a West End actor, was wounded as a young soldier.

Clara moved to California in 1908 to appear in D.W. Griffith's 1908 film The Red Girl, leaving her husband behind in Australia. She also appeared on Broadway for Charles Frohman. Clara appeared in 90 films between 1908 and 1932, becoming one of the earliest film actresses. Bracy's husband died in 1917. At the time of Henry Bracy's death, Clara had been living in New York with her son Sydney. Clara Bracy died in Los Angeles, California in 1941, aged 93.

== Selected filmography ==
- The Red Girl (1908)
- The Feud and the Turkey (1908)
- The Maniac Cook (1909)
- Those Boys! (1909)
- The Cord of Life (1909)
- The Curtain Pole (1909)
- The Girls and Daddy (1909)
- Edgar Allen Poe (1909)
- The Road to the Heart (1909)
- Tragic Love (1909)
- At the Altar (1909)
- The Lonely Villa (1909)
- Two Memories (1909)
- Pippa Passes (1909)
- What the Daisy Said (1910)
- The Fugitive (1910)
- The Modern Prodigal (1910) as The Prodigal's Mother
- The Two Paths (1911)
- His Trust Fulfilled (1911)
- The Lily of the Tenements (1911)
- A Decree of Destiny (1911)
- The Musketeers of Pig Alley (1912)
- My Baby (1912)
- The Informer (1912)
- Brutality (1912)
- The New York Hat (1912)
- The God Within (1912)
- Three Friends (1913)
- Brothers (1913)
- Oil and Water (1913)
- Love in an Apartment Hotel (1913)
- The Wrong Bottle (1913)
- The Tender Hearted Boy (1913)
- Judith of Bethulia (1914)
- Her Night of Romance (1924)
- If I Had a Million (1932)
