= Tears and Smiles =

- Directed by: William Bertram
- Written by: Betty Burbridge; Marc Edmund Jones
- Starring: Marie Osborne; Philo McCullough; Marion Warner
- Production company: Lasalida Film Corporation
- Distributed by: Pathé Exchange
- Release date: September 2, 1917
- Running time: 50 minutes
- Country: United States
- Languages: Silent; English intertitles

Tears and Smiles is a lost 1917 American silent drama film directed by William Bertram and starring Marie Osborne, Philo McCullough and Marion Warner.

== Cast ==
- Marie Osborne as Little Marie
- Melvin Mayo as Marie's Father
- Marion Warner as Marie's Mother
- Philo McCullough as Mr. Greer
- Katherine MacLaren as Mrs. Greer

== Preservation ==
With no holdings located in archives, Tears and Smiles is considered a lost film.

== Bibliography ==
- Robert B. Connelly. The Silents: Silent Feature Films, 1910-36, Volume 40, Issue 2. December Press, 1998.
