= Cliff Nazarro =

American comedian (1904–1961)

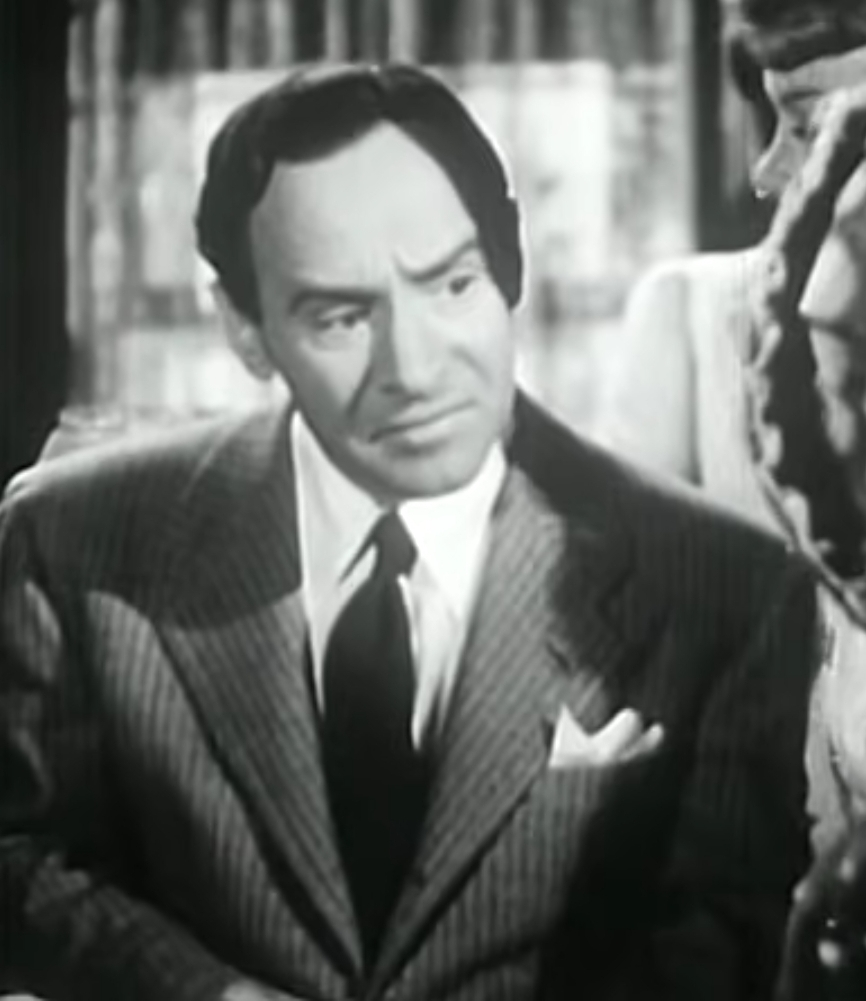
- Nazarro in I'm from Arkansas (1944)
- Born: Clifford Nazarro; January 31, 1904
- Died: February 18, 1961 (aged 57)
- Occupations: Actor, comedian, vocalist
- Years active: 1926–1949

Clifford Nazarro (January 31, 1904 – February 18, 1961 ) was an American double-talk comedian, vocalist, and actor of the 1920s, 1930s and 1940s who appeared in films such as You'll Never Get Rich (1941) as Swivel Tongue with Fred Astaire and Rita Hayworth, In Old Colorado (1941) as Nosey Haskins with William Boyd, and Hillbilly Blitzkrieg (1942) as Barney Google.

== Career ==
A comment in a 1942 newspaper article summed up Nazarro's varied talents: "He played all sorts of roles in stock companies, was a versatile actor in musical comedy and vaudeville, is one of the top masters-of-ceremony in show business, and was a serious vocalist on the radio."

Nazarro made a few commercial recordings, including a 1932 date as the featured vocalist with the band Roane's Pennsylvanians and a 1942 comic recitation, "News of the World." He made several uncredited appearances on The Jack Benny Program during the 1930s and early 1940s, and provided voices for Warner Bros. Cartoons from 1935 to 1949.

== Partial filmography ==
- Modern Minstrels (1930)
- Billboard Frolics (1935) - Eddie Camphor / Worm (voice, uncredited)
- Romance Rides the Range (1936) - 'Shorty'
- The Singing Buckaroo (1937) - Gabby
- Behind the Mike (1937) - Messenger Boy (uncredited)
- Thoroughbreds Don't Cry (1937) - Tubby Wells (uncredited)
- Outside of Paradise (1938) - Cliff
- The Penguin Parade (1938) - Penguin Presenter (voice, uncredited)
- A Desperate Adventure (1938) - Tipo
- Wholly Smoke (1938) - Bing Crosby Cigar / Rudy Vallee Cigar (voice, uncredited)
- Stablemates (1938) - Cliff (uncredited)
- Artists and Models Abroad (1938) - Guide (uncredited)
- St. Louis Blues (1939) - Shorty
- King of the Turf (1939) - 1st Tout
- Forged Passport (1939) - 'Shakespeare'
- Believe It or Else (1939) - Narrator (voice, uncredited)
- Slap Happy Pappy (1940) - Bing Crosby / Eddie Cackler (voice, uncredited)
- Grandpa Goes to Town (1940) - (uncredited)
- The Crooked Road (1940) - Minor (uncredited)
- Scatterbrain (1940) - Double-Talker (uncredited)
- Sing, Dance, Plenty Hot (1940) - Double-Talker (uncredited)
- Arise, My Love (1940) - Botzelberg
- Mr. Dynamite (1941) - Little Man
- In Old Colorado (1941) - Nosey Haskins
- Melody for Three (1941) - Mortimer Effington, sound effects demonstrator (uncredited)
- Rookies on Parade (1941) - Joe Martin
- Porky's Preview (1941) - Al Jolson caricature (voice, uncredited)
- Farm Frolics (1941) - Cantor Horse (voice, uncredited)
- Dive Bomber (1941) - Corps Man
- World Premiere (1941) - Peters
- You'll Never Get Rich (1941) - Swivel Tongue
- Sailors on Leave (1941) - Mike
- New York Town (1941) - Burt's Companion (uncredited)
- The Night of January 16th (1941) - Gas Station Attendant
- Blondie Goes to College (1942) - Professor Mixwell, The Double Talker (uncredited)
- Pardon My Stripes (1942) - Nutsy
- Hillbilly Blitzkrieg (1942) - Barney Google
- Call of the Canyon (1942) - Pete Murphy
- Rhythm Parade (1942) - Rocks MacDougal
- Shantytown (1943) - 'Shortcake'
- Trocadero (1944) - Cliff
- Swing Hostess (1944) - Bobo
- I'm from Arkansas (1944) - Willie Childs
- Ding Dong Williams (1946) - Zing
- Gentleman Joe Palooka (1946) - First Character
- Blue Skies (1946) - Cliff - Piano Player (uncredited)
- Curtain Razor (1949) - Frankie the Rooster (voice, uncredited)
