= Brutality (film) =

1912 film

- Directed by: D. W. Griffith
- Written by: D. W. Griffith
- Starring: Walter Miller
- Cinematography: G. W. Bitzer
- Distributed by: General Film Company
- Release date: December 2, 1912
- Running time: 33 minutes
- Country: United States
- Language: Silent (English intertitles)

Brutality is a 1912 American drama film directed by D. W. Griffith. Prints and/or fragments were found in the Dawson Film Find in 1978.

== Cast ==
- Walter Miller as The Young Man
- Mae Marsh as The Young Woman
- Joseph Graybill as The Victim of Anger
- Lionel Barrymore at wedding
- Elmer Booth in play
- Clara T. Bracy at wedding / at theatre
- William J. Butler at theatre
- Harry Carey at theatre
- John T. Dillon at wedding / outside bar
- Frank Evans outside bar
- Dorothy Gish
- Lillian Gish at theatre
- Robert Harron
- Madge Kirby at theatre
- Walter P. Lewis at wedding
- Charles Hill Mailes at theatre
- Alfred Paget outside bar
- Jack Pickford at theatre
- Gus Pixley at theatre
- W. C. Robinson at theatre
- Henry B. Walthall in play
- J. Waltham at theatre

== See also ==
- List of American films of 1912
- Harry Carey filmography
- D. W. Griffith filmography
- Lillian Gish filmography
- Lionel Barrymore filmography
