= An Adventure in the Autumn Woods =

1913 film

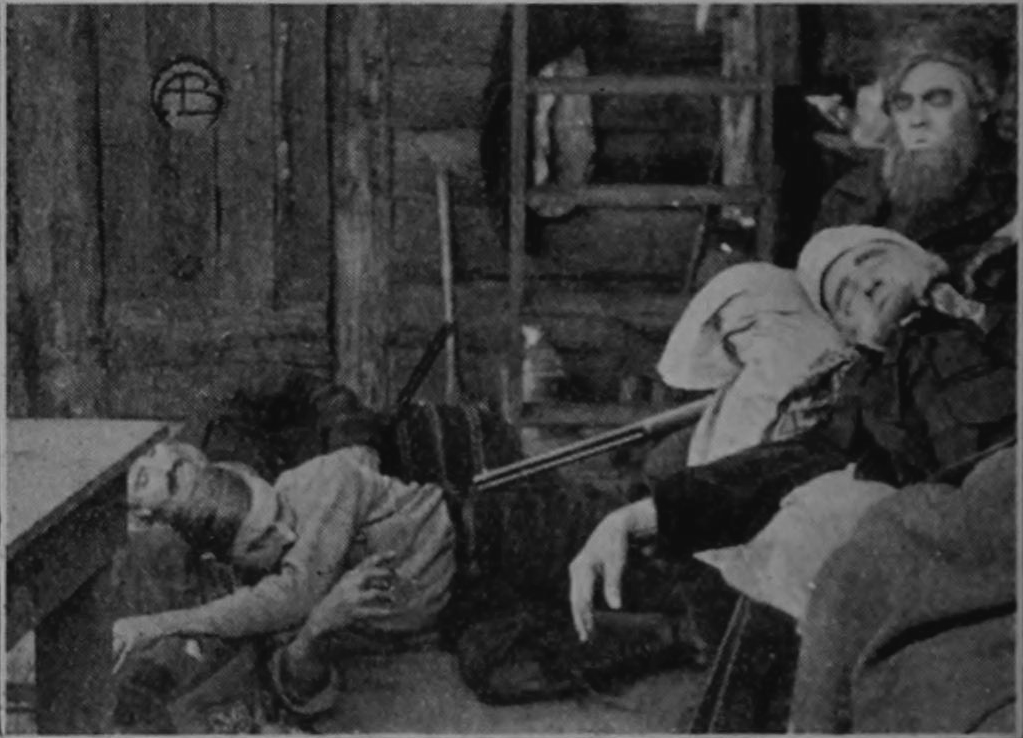
- Directed by: D. W. Griffith
- Written by: Christy Cabanne
- Starring: Mae Marsh
- Cinematography: G. W. Bitzer
- Production company: Biograph Company
- Distributed by: General Film Company
- Release date: January 16, 1913
- Running time: 17 minutes
- Country: United States
- Language: Silent (English intertitles)

An Adventure in the Autumn Woods is a 1913 American silent short drama film directed by D. W. Griffith.

== Cast ==
- Mae Marsh as The Girl
- W. Chrystie Miller as The Grandfather
- Lionel Barrymore as The Father
- Walter Miller as The Boy
- Alfred Paget as The Woodsman
- Frank Opperman as First Thief
- Charles Hill Mailes as Second Thief
- Harry Carey as Third Thief
- Adolph Lestina as At Trading Post
- Walter P. Lewis as In Posse
- Joseph McDermott as At Trading Post

== See also ==
- List of American films of 1913
- Harry Carey filmography
- D. W. Griffith filmography
- Lionel Barrymore filmography
