= Mina Cunard =

American actress

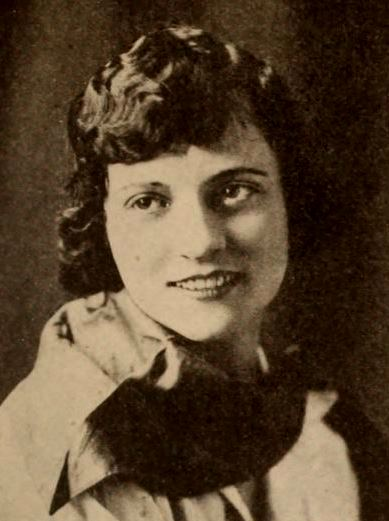
- Exhibitors Herald, 1919
- Born: Armina Jeffries; December 16, 1894; Columbus, Ohio, US
- Died: August 9, 1978 (aged 83); Woodland Hills, California, US
- Occupation: Actress
- Spouse: Harry Seymour
- Relatives: Grace Cunard (sister)

Mina Cunard (born Armina Jeffries; sometimes credited Margaret Mayburn; December 16, 1894—August 9, 1978) was an American actress who performed in small roles in American films between the 1910s and the 1950s. She was the younger sister of popular actress Grace Cunard.

== Biography ==
Cunard was born in Columbus, Ohio, to Washington Jeffries and Lola Longshore. She had a half-brother named Quincy from her mother's first marriage as well as a sister named Grace. After Grace entered the film industry, Mina followed suit; the pair often worked together, although Grace became a more well-known actress.

She more or less disappeared from the silver screen by the beginning of the 1920s, instead appearing on stage with her husband, actor/radio announcer Harry Seymour, with whom she had one child. She returned to acting in motion pictures in the 1940s.

== Selected filmography ==
- 1957 Jeanne Eagels
- 1955 Good Morning, Miss Dove
- 1955 How to Be Very, Very Popular (uncredited)
- 1954 Prince Valiant (uncredited)
- 1944 The Conspirators
- 1943 Good Luck, Mr. Yates
- 1919 A Beach Nut (Short)
- 1918 The Bathhouse Scandal (Short)
- 1916 The Black Sheep of the Family
- 1916/III Hired and Fired (Short)
- 1916 Is Any Girl Safe?
- 1916 What Love Can Do
- 1916 The League of the Future (Short)
- 1915 Lord John's Journal
- 1915 Graft (as Margaret Mayburn)
- 1915 The Broken Coin
- 1915 Little Mr. Fixer (Short)
