= Blind Love (1912 film) =

1912 film

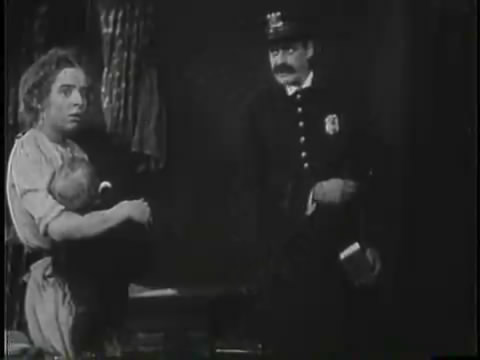
- Blanche Sweet and Alfred Paget in the film
- Directed by: D. W. Griffith
- Written by: Maie B. Havey
- Starring: Blanche Sweet; Harry Hyde
- Release date: September 12, 1912
- Country: United States
- Language: Silent (English intertitles)

Blind Love is a 1912 American short silent drama film directed by D. W. Griffith and starring Blanche Sweet.

== Plot ==
A young woman tired of her boring life decides to leave her husband for another man who she finds more exciting. Later, with a child and in disgrace she realizes that she made a huge mistake and tries to go back to her husband.

== Cast ==
- Blanche Sweet as The Young Woman
- Harry Hyde as The Young Woman's Husband
- Edward Dillon as The Young Man
- Hector Sarno as A Gypsy (as Hector V. Sarno)
- W. Chrystie Miller as The Young Man's Father
- Kate Toncray as The Minister's Wife
- William J. Butler as The Landlord
- Joseph McDermott as The Doctor
- Alfred Paget as A Policeman
- Kathleen Butler as At the Social
- John T. Dillon as At the Social
- Frank Evans as On the Road
- Walter P. Lewis as At the Social
- W. C. Robinson as At the Social
- Charles West

== See also ==
- List of American films of 1912
- D. W. Griffith filmography
- Blanche Sweet filmography
