= Mentioned in Confidence =

- Directed by: Edgar Jones
- Written by: Howard Fielding (story); Captain Leslie Peacocke (scenario)
- Produced by: Balboa Amusement Producing Film Company
- Starring: Vola Vale
- Distributed by: General Film Company
- Release date: March 8, 1917
- Running time: 4 reels
- Country: USA
- Language: Silent..English titles

Mentioned in Confidence is a 1917 silent film drama directed by Edgar Jones and produced by the Balboa Film Producing Company.

The film survives in the Library of Congress collection.

== Cast ==
- Vola Vale- Marjorie Manning
- R. Henry Grey - Gordon Leigh
- Frank Brownlee - Mr. Leigh
- Melvin Mayo -Robert Manning
- Leah Gibbs - Perda Brentane
- Bruce Smith - Father Daly
- Gordon Sackville - Capitalist
