= Conflict (1921 film) =

1921 film

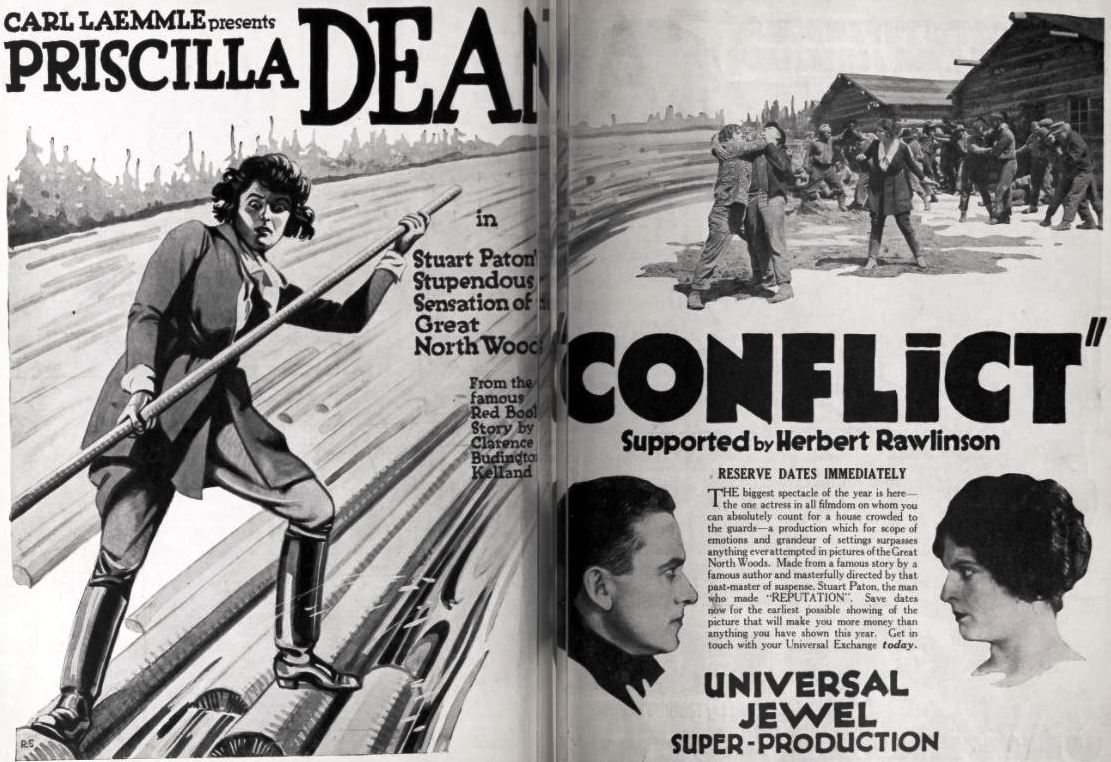
- Directed by: Stuart Paton
- Written by: George C. Hull
- Based on: Conflict; 1921 novel, serialized in Redbook by Clarence Budington Kelland
- Produced by: Carl Laemmle
- Starring: Priscilla Dean; Edward Connelly; Hector V. Sarno
- Cinematography: Harold Janes
- Production company: Universal Pictures
- Distributed by: Universal Pictures
- Release date: October 23, 1921
- Running time: 70 minutes
- Country: United States
- Languages: Silent; English intertitles

Conflict (or The Conflict) is 1921 American silent drama film directed by Stuart Paton and starring Priscilla Dean, Edward Connelly and Hector V. Sarno.

== Cast ==
- Priscilla Dean as Dorcas Remalie
- Edward Connelly as John Remalie
- Hector V. Sarno as Buck Fallon
- Martha Mattox as Miss Labo
- Olah Norman as Letty Piggott
- Herbert Rawlinson as Jevons
- Lee Shumway as Mark Sloane
- Sam Allen as Orrin Lakin
- C.E. Anderson as Ovid Jenks
- Knute Erickson as Hannibal Ginger
- William Gillis as Hasdrubel Ginger
- Fred Kohler as Jevons' foreman

== Bibliography ==
- Connelly, Robert B. The Silents: Silent Feature Films, 1910-36, Volume 40, Issue 2. December Press, 1998.
- Munden, Kenneth White. The American Film Institute Catalog of Motion Pictures Produced in the United States, Part 1. University of California Press, 1997.
