= The Black Sheep of the Family =

1916 film directed by Jay Hunt

- Directed by: Jay Hunt
- Written by: Frank Wiltermood; Jay Hunt
- Starring: Francelia Billington; Jack Holt; Gilmore Hammond
- Production company: Universal Pictures
- Distributed by: Universal Pictures
- Release date: October 23, 1916
- Running time: 5 reels
- Country: United States
- Languages: Silent; English intertitles

The Black Sheep of the Family is a 1916 American silent mystery film directed by Jay Hunt and starring Francelia Billington, Jack Holt, and Gilmore Hammond.

== Cast ==
- Francelia Billington as Esther Saunders
- Jack Holt as Kenneth Carmont
- Gilmore Hammond as Elwood Collins
- Paul Byron as Bert Saunders
- Mina Cunard as Bertha Carmont
- C. Norman Hammond as Madison Carmont
- Florence Hale as Mrs. Carmont
- Hector V. Sarno as Simon Hathaway
- William Musgrave as Louis Dairymple

== Bibliography ==
- Ken Wlaschin. Silent Mystery and Detective Movies: A Comprehensive Filmography. McFarland, 2009.
