= Gertrude Bambrick =

American actress

- Born: August 24, 1897
- Died: January 10, 1974 (aged 76); Boynton Beach, Florida, United States
- Occupation: Actress
- Years active: 1912–1916
- Spouse(s): Marshall Neilan (1913–1921) Jack Alicoate (div. 1929)

Gertrude Bambrick (August 24, 1897 – January 10, 1974) was an American actress of the silent era. She appeared in 60 films between 1912 and 1916.

== Biography ==
Bambrick was married twice. Her first marriage to early film director Marshall Neilan ended in divorce and resulted in one child, Marshall Neilan Jr, who later became a successful film editor. Neilan fell in love with Bambrick while working in New York City in 1914, and at the time he was a rising star in film direction. At one point during their marriage he was earning $15,000 per week. He was involved in several affairs during their marriage. Bambrick retired from acting in 1916 after marrying Neilan, before her career could ever really take off.

Bambrick divorced Neilan in 1921 after discovering he was involved in an affair with early film actress Blanche Sweet. Neilan went on to marry Sweet, and they divorced in 1929, when his career failed and he was in financial ruin.

Bambrick's second marriage was to Jack Alicoate. They had two children, Patricia and Virginia. She never returned to acting and died in Boynton Beach, Florida.

== Selected filmography ==
Year	Film	Role	Notes
1912	Two Daughters of Eve	Backstage	
1912	The One She Loved	The Stenographer	
1912	The Musketeers of Pig Alley	Girl at Dance	Uncredited
1912	The New York Hat	In Shop/Outside Church	Uncredited
1912	Gold and Glitter		
1912	The Burglar's Dilemma	Birthday Wellwisher	
1912	The God Within	In Bar	
1913	The Telephone Girl and the Lady	The Maid	
1913	Brothers	Non-Committal Woman	
1913	Oil and Water	Among Dancers	
1913	Love in an Apartment Hotel	In Hotel Lobby	
1913	Broken Ways	In Telegraph Office/On Street	
1913	Near to Earth	Gato's Sweetheart	
1913	Red Hicks Defies the World	In Crowd	
1913	The Mothering Heart	Female Apache Dancer	
1913	The Suffragette Minstrels		
1913	Almost a Wild Man	Member of Lizzy and Her Dancing Girls Troupe / Blackface Sideshow Patron	
1914	Judith of Bethulia	Lead Assyrian Dancer	
1914	Virtue Is Its Own Reward	Alice	
1915	The Miser's Legacy		
