= Graft (1915 serial) =

1915 film

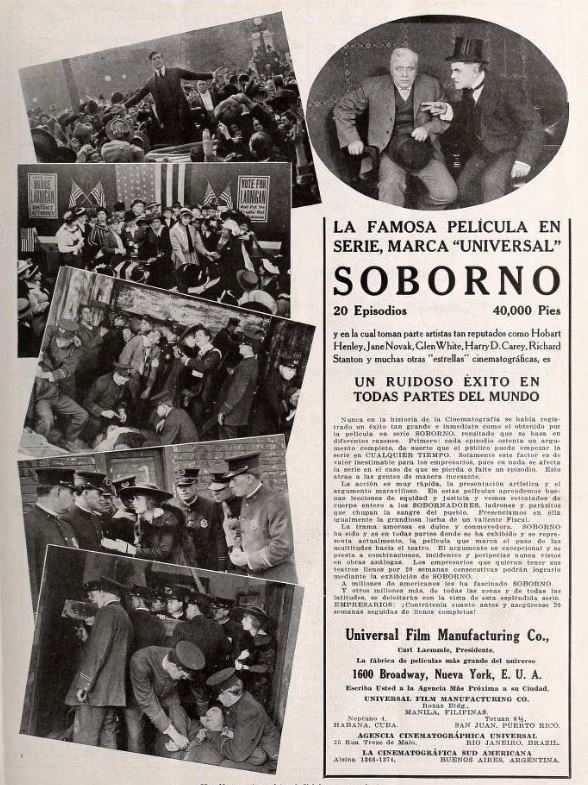
- Spanish language advertisement under the title Soborno
- Directed by: George Lessey; Richard Stanton
- Written by: Joe Brandt; Walter Woods
- Starring: Harry Carey
- Distributed by: Universal Film Manufacturing Company
- Release date: December 11, 1915
- Running time: 20 2 reel episodes
- Country: United States
- Language: Silent (English intertitles)

Graft is a 1915 American film serial directed by George Lessey and Richard Stanton featuring Harry Carey. This serial is considered to be lost.

== Cast ==
- Harry Carey as Tom Larnigan (Episodes 4-12). Carey took over lead from Hobart Henley from the fourth chapter.
- Hobart Henley as Bruce Larnigan (Episodes 1-3)
- Jane Novak as Dorothy Maxwell
- Richard Stanton as Robert Harding
- Glen White as Stanford Stone
- Nanine Wright as Mrs. Larnigan
- Mark Fenton as Roger Maxwell
- Mina Cunard as Kitty Rockford
- Jack Connolly as Ben Travers (credited as Jack F. Connolly)
- Jack Abbott as Jim Stevens (credited as Jack F. Abbott)
- Wadsworth Harris as Mark Gamble
- J. Edwin Brown (credited as Edward Brown)
- William T. Horne (credited as W.T. Horne)
- Hayward Mack
- L. M. Wells as Roger Maxwell
- Rex De Rosselli
- Fred Montague (credited as Frederick Montague)
- Andrew Arbuckle
- Hector Sarno (credited as Hector V. Sarno)
- Will E. Sheerer as Dudley Larnigan (credited as William Sheerer)
- Jack Curtis as Murphy
- Edward Clark (credited as E. Clark)
- Frank MacQuarrie
- George A. McDaniel (credited as Mr. McDaniels)

== Production ==
In an experiment, the plot was written in a round robin by several writers for both print and film. Each chapter was written by a different writer: Anna Katharine Green, Irvin S. Cobb, Louis Joseph Vance, Leroy Scott, Rupert Hughes, Zane Grey, James Oppenheim, C.N. Williamson, A.M. Williamson, Wallace Irwin, Reginald Wright Kaufman, James Francis Dwyer, Mrs. Wilson Woodrow, Joe Mitchell Chapple, Frederic S. Isham, George Bronson Howard, Nina Wilcox Putnam and Hugh Weir.

== Chapter titles ==
1. Liquor and the Law
2. The Tenement House Evil
3. The Traction Grab
4. The Power of the People
5. Grinding Life Down
6. The Railroad Monopoly
7. America Saved from War/Busting The Steel Trust
8. Old King Coal
9. The Insurance Swindlers
10. The Harbor Transportation Trust
11. The Illegal Bucket Shops
12. The Milk Battle
13. Powder Trust and the War
14. The Iron Ring
15. The Patent Medicine Danger
16. The Pirates of Finance
17. The Queen of the Prophets
18. The Hidden City of Crime
19. The Photo Badger Game
20. The Final Conquest

== See also ==
- List of film serials
- List of film serials by studio
