= The Perfidy of Mary =

1913 American silent film

- Directed by: D. W. Griffith
- Starring: Dorothy Gish; Mae Marsh; Lionel Barrymore
- Release date: 1913 (U.S.)
- Country: United States
- Language: Silent (English intertitles)

The Perfidy of Mary is a 1913 American silent film directed by D. W. Griffith. The picture stars Dorothy Gish and Mae Marsh and has comedic overtones. The film survives with a print held by the Museum of Modern Art film archive.

== Cast ==
- Dorothy Gish as Rose
- Mae Marsh as Mary
- Walter Miller as Rose's suitor
- Harry Hyde as Mary's suitor
- Lionel Barrymore as Mary's father
- Kate Bruce as Mary's mother
- Henry B. Walthall as the poet
