= Withering Roses =

- Directed by: Harry A. Pollard
- Starring: Margarita Fischer; Harry A. Pollard
- Production company: American Film Manufacturing Company
- Release date: January 14, 1914

Withering Roses is a 1914 American silent film directed by Harry A. Pollard. It stars Margarita Fischer and Pollard.

It is a lost film.

In addition to Pollard and Fischer, the cast included Joseph Harrisk, Adelaide Bronti, Kathie Discher, and Fred Gamble.

== Reception ==
Pictures and the Picturegoer called it "a 'beauty' film which strikes an entirely new note in film production." The Moving Picture World said "it fails to convince as a picture of life, but as a fairy tale it will get by and perhaps please many."
