= The Chief's Blanket =

1912 film

- Directed by: D. W. Griffith
- Written by: Wilfred Lucas
- Starring: Blanche Sweet; Lionel Barrymore
- Distributed by: General Film Company
- Release date: October 10, 1912
- Country: United States
- Language: Silent (English intertitles)

The Chief's Blanket is a 1912 American short silent Western film directed by D. W. Griffith, starring Blanche Sweet and Lionel Barrymore.

== Cast ==
- Lionel Barrymore as The Young Man
- Blanche Sweet as The Young Woman
- W. Chrystie Miller as The Father
- Charles West as The Outlaw (as Charles H. West)
- Alfred Paget as The Unfaithful Sentinel
- Adolph Lestina as The Doctor
- Walter P. Lewis as The Indian Chief
- Charles Gorman as An Indian
- Wilfred Lucas
- Joseph McDermott as Among Settlers
- Jack Pickford as An Indian
- W. C. Robinson as An Indian
- Hector Sarno as An Indian (as Hector V. Sarno)

== See also ==
- List of American films of 1912
- D. W. Griffith filmography
- Blanche Sweet filmography
- Lionel Barrymore filmography
