= Soapsuds and Sapheads =

1919 film

- Directed by: J.A. Howe
- Written by: J.A. Howe
- Produced by: Albert E. Smith
- Starring: Oliver Hardy
- Cinematography: R.D. Armstrong
- Production company: Vitagraph
- Release date: February 1919
- Running time: 2 reels
- Country: United States
- Language: Silent (English intertitles)

Soapsuds and Sapheads is a 1919 American silent short comedy film featuring Oliver Hardy.

== Plot ==
According to the copyright description, "Touring the country in his "super-twin Regale", Jimmy meets Miss Iona Booick, who is won by his debonair nonchalance, and invites him to ride in her car. He accepts. They have a little trouble running the machine along the road, but finally reach Miss Booick's laundry, where the foreman, a rough, uncouth person, meets them. She elects Jimmy manager of her laundry, and the foreman immediately begins to show jealousy and hatred. His passion getting the better of him, the foreman secures the aid of his allies, and there are several attempts made on Jim's life, but each time Miss Booick interferes and saves it. He does not care for her love-making, having a weakness for blondes. She tries to force him into marrying her, and managing to turn her jealous mind onto a little game of "eeny-meeny-miny-mo", runs away with the "blonde". The foreman again calls her attention to Jimmy's deceit - and she promises to be his wife if he will catch him. Getting the preacher, Miss Booick and the foreman and his allies give chase while Jimmy and the blonde rush on in the small car. On a scenic railway Jimmy manages to overpower the foreman and throw him over the tracks. And the chase begins all over again, finally ending by Jimmy and the girl in the car flying over a cliff. Followed by the other crowd, who have left their car in the rear, there is quite a shakeup when the ground or overhang of the cliff gives way - and all are thrown to the ground below. The preacher manages to make Jim and the girl "one" as both over come, become unconscious as the picture closes."

== Cast ==
- Jimmy Aubrey as Jimmy
- Oliver Hardy as Foreman (as Babe Hardy)
- Madge Kirby

== See also ==
- List of American films of 1919
- Oliver Hardy filmography
