= Pardon My Stripes =

1942 film by John H. Auer

- Theatrical release poster
- Directed by: John H. Auer
- Screenplay by: Lawrence Kimble; Stuart Palmer
- Story by: Mauri Grashin; Robert T. Shannon
- Produced by: Albert J. Cohen
- Starring: William "Bill" Henry; Sheila Ryan; Edgar Kennedy; Harold Huber; Paul Hurst; Cliff Nazarro
- Cinematography: John Alton
- Edited by: Howard O'Neill
- Music by: Mort Glickman
- Production company: Republic Pictures
- Distributed by: Republic Pictures
- Release date: January 26, 1942
- Running time: 64 minutes
- Country: United States
- Language: English

Pardon My Stripes is a 1942 American comedy film directed by John H. Auer and written by Lawrence Kimble and Stuart Palmer. The film stars William "Bill" Henry, Sheila Ryan, Edgar Kennedy, Harold Huber, Paul Hurst and Cliff Nazarro. The film was released on January 26, 1942, by Republic Pictures.

== Cast ==
- William "Bill" Henry as Henry Platt
- Sheila Ryan as Ruth Stevens
- Edgar Kennedy as Warden Bingham
- Harold Huber as Big George Kilraine
- Paul Hurst as Feets
- Cliff Nazarro as Nutsy
- Tom Kennedy as Casino
- Edwin Stanley as Andrews
- Dorothy Granger as Peaches
- George McKay as Old Timer
- Maxine Leslie as Myrtle
