= Red Hicks Defies the World =

1913 film

- Directed by: Dell Henderson
- Written by: William E. Wing
- Starring: Charles Murray
- Distributed by: General Film Company
- Release date: June 9, 1913
- Country: United States
- Languages: Silent; English intertitles

Red Hicks Defies the World is a 1913 American short comedy film featuring Harry Carey.

== Cast ==
- Charles Murray as "Red" Hicks
- Edward Dillon as O'Shea, The Fighting Irishman
- Dorothy Gish as Hicks' Sweetheart
- Kate Toncray as Hick's Mother
- Bud Duncan as Hick's Trainer
- William J. Butler as First Creditor
- Adolph Lestina as Second Creditor
- Lionel Barrymore as The Referee
- Gertrude Bambrick as In Crowd
- William Beaudine as In Ring
- Harry Carey as In Crowd
- John T. Dillon as In Crowd
- Frank Evans as In Crowd
- Charles Gorman as In Crowd
- Harry Hyde as In Crowd
- J. Jiquel Lanoe as In Crowd
- Charles Hill Mailes as In Crowd
- Joseph McDermott as In Crowd
- Walter Miller as In Crowd
- Frank Opperman as In Crowd
- Alfred Paget as In Crowd
- Henry B. Walthall as In Crowd
- Charles West as In Crowd

== See also ==
- Harry Carey filmography
- Lionel Barrymore filmography
