= The Suffragette Minstrels =

1913 film

The Suffragette Minstrels is a short silent movie from 1913 written by Dorothy Gish and directed by Dell Henderson. It starred Sylvia Ashton and included Gertrude Bambrick, William Beaudine, and William J. Butler, among others.
