= Walter P. Lewis =

American actor

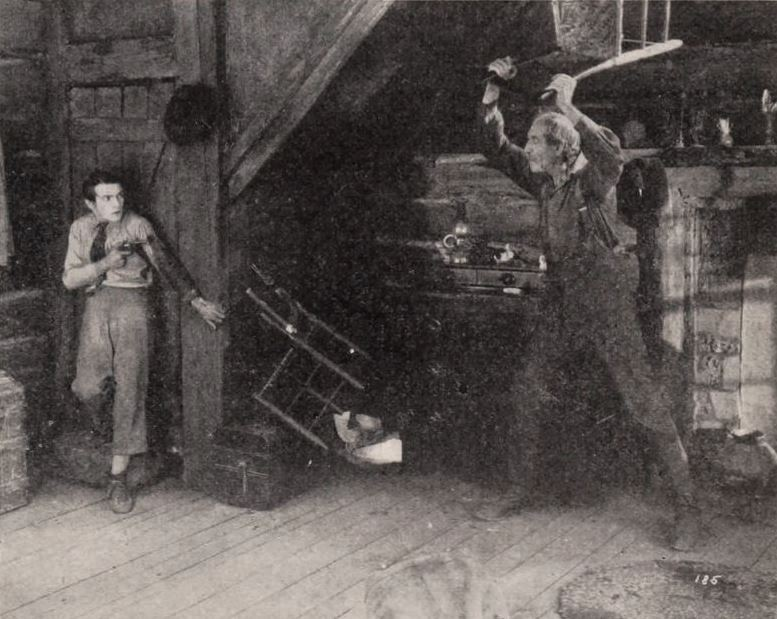
- Lewis (right) with Richard Barthelmess in Tol'able David, 1921
- Born: June 10, 1866; Albany, New York, US
- Died: January 30, 1932 (aged 65)
- Occupation: Actor
- Years active: 1912–1931

Walter P. Lewis (June 10, 1866 – January 30, 1932) was an American actor of the silent era. He appeared in 55 films between 1912 and 1931. He was born in Albany, New York.

== Partial filmography ==
- My Hero (1912)
- Brutality (1912)
- My Baby (1912)
- Gold and Glitter (1912)
- Heredity (1912)
- The Musketeers of Pig Alley (1912)
- The New York Hat (1912)
- The Painted Lady (1912)
- The Chief's Blanket (1912)
- Blind Love (1912)
- Love in an Apartment Hotel (1913)
- Brothers (1913)
- A Misappropriated Turkey (1913)
- Fate (1913)
- An Adventure in the Autumn Woods (1913)
- The Telephone Girl and the Lady (1913)
- Three Friends (1913)
- The Tender Hearted Boy (1913)
- The Eternal Sapho (1916)
- The Seven Pearls (1917)
- The Avenging Trail (1917)
- To Hell with the Kaiser! (1918)
- Uncle Tom's Cabin (1918)
- Out of a Clear Sky (1918)
- The White Moll (1920)
- The Birth of a Soul (1920)
- The Ghost in the Garret (1921)
- Tol'able David (1921)
- The Family Closet (1921)
- Lonesome Corners (1922)
- The Steadfast Heart (1923)
- Three Miles Out (1924)
- The Green Archer (1925)
- Down Upon the Suwanee River (1925)
- The Crimson Flash (1927)
- On Guard (1927)
- The Little Shepherd of Kingdom Come (1928)
- Beware of Blondes (1928)
