= The Telephone Girl and the Lady =

1913 film

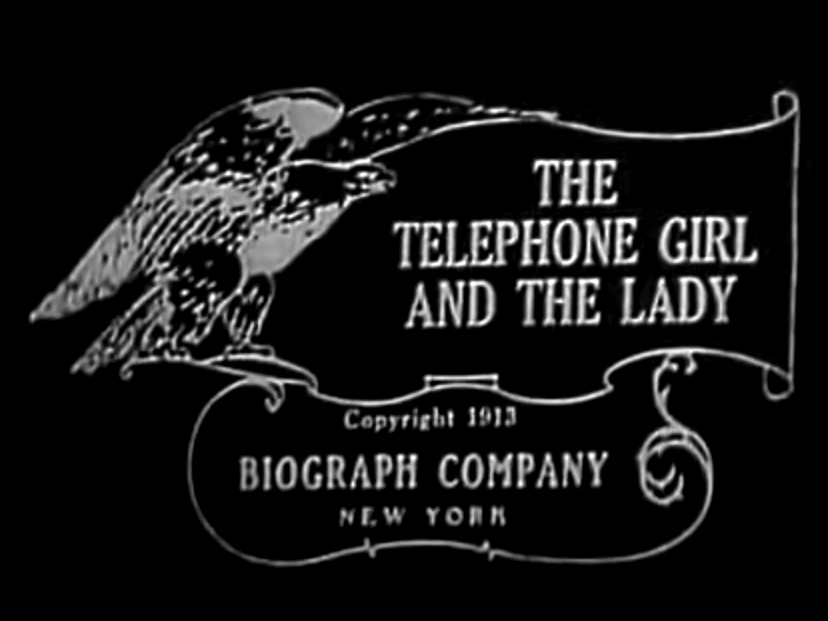
- Title card
- Directed by: D. W. Griffith
- Written by: Edward Acker; Anita Loos
- Starring: Mae Marsh; Claire McDowell; Alfred Paget
- Cinematography: G. W. Bitzer
- Distributed by: Biograph Company; General Film Company
- Release date: January 6, 1913
- Running time: 17 minutes (16 frame/s)
- Country: United States
- Language: Silent (English intertitles)

Play partial film; runtime 00:11:09

The Telephone Girl and the Lady is a 1913 American silent drama film directed by D. W. Griffith. At least a partial print of this film exists.

== Plot ==
A telephone operator is courting a handsome police sergeant, but her father wants her to marry a grocery store owner. Meanwhile, a wealthy lady retrieves her jewels from a jewelry store and brings them home, unaware that a jewel thief on a stolen bicycle is following her. She places the jewels in her safe and gives the telephone operator a necklace as thanks for her work.

While the lady is on the phone accepting the operator's thanks, a masked thief breaks in. The lady tells the operator she's being robbed. The operator tries to call the police, but riot-related calls jam the lines. She runs from the telephone exchange and spots the sergeant riding by. He lifts her onto his horse and they race to help.

The thief threatens the lady and forces her to reveal the safe hidden behind a picture. The sergeant arrives just as the thief escapes with the jewels. After a fight involving the telephone operator and neighbors, including a lady in an enormous hat, the sergeant captures the thief. The grateful lady rewards the sergeant, and the two lovers embrace.

== Cast ==
- Mae Marsh as The Telephone Girl
- Claire McDowell as The Lady
- Alfred Paget as The Telephone Girl's Sweetheart
- Walter P. Lewis as The Father
- Harry Carey as The Thief
- John T. Dillon as The Grocery Man
- Madge Kirby as The Telephone Operator
- Joseph McDermott as The Jewelry Salesman
- Kate Bruce as The Lady's Friend
- Gertrude Bambrick as The Maid
- Lionel Barrymore as The Desk Sergeant
- Charles Hill Mailes

== Production ==
The film was prepared by Griffith and shot by his assistant, Tony O'Sullivan.

Film historian William K. Everson noted that the film made use of a moving camera in "some extremely good running inserts" and a "well-done fight between Paget and villain Harry Carey at the climax", but offered that the film did not have a good flow due to its awkward cuts and overuse of devices intended to prolong suspense.

== See also ==
- Harry Carey filmography
- D. W. Griffith filmography
- Lionel Barrymore filmography
