= The God Within =

1912 film

- Directed by: D. W. Griffith
- Written by: F. P. Bayer
- Starring: Blanche Sweet; Henry B. Walthall
- Cinematography: G. W. Bitzer
- Distributed by: Biograph Company; General Film Company
- Release date: December 26, 1912
- Running time: 17 minutes (16 frame/s)
- Country: United States
- Language: Silent (English intertitles)

The God Within is a 1912 American short drama film directed by D. W. Griffith and starring Blanche Sweet. A print of the film survives.

== Cast ==
- Henry B. Walthall as The Woodsman
- Claire McDowell as The Woodsman's Wife
- Blanche Sweet as The Woman of the Camp
- Lionel Barrymore as The Woman of the Camp's Lover
- Charles Hill Mailes as The Doctor
- Gertrude Bambrick as In Bar
- Clara T. Bracy as The Madam
- William J. Butler as In Other Town
- W. Christy Cabanne as On Street
- Harry Carey
- John T. Dillon as On Street
- Frank Evans as In Bar
- Charles Gorman as In Bar / In Other Town
- Joseph Graybill as In Bar
- J. Jiquel Lanoe as In Other Town
- Adolph Lestina as In Other Town
- W. C. Robinson as In Bar
- Charles West as In Other Town (credited as Charles H. West)

== See also ==
- Harry Carey filmography
- D. W. Griffith filmography
- Blanche Sweet filmography
- Lionel Barrymore filmography
