= Brothers (1913 film) =

1913 film

- Directed by: D. W. Griffith
- Written by: H. M. L. Nolte
- Starring: Charles Hill Mailes; Robert Harron; Clara T. Bracy
- Cinematography: G. W. Bitzer
- Production company: Biograph Company
- Release date: February 3, 1913 (U.S.)
- Running time: 17 minutes (16 frame/s)
- Country: United States
- Language: Silent (English intertitles)

Brothers is a 1913 American silent drama film directed by D. W. Griffith.

== Cast ==
- Charles Hill Mailes as the father
- Robert Harron as the father's favorite son
- Clara T. Bracy as the mother
- Harry Carey as the mother's favorite son
- Gertrude Bambrick as non-committal woman
- Walter P. Lewis as the neighbor
- Adolph Lestina as the doctor
- Mabel Normand

== See also ==
- List of American films of 1913
