= My Baby (film) =

1912 film

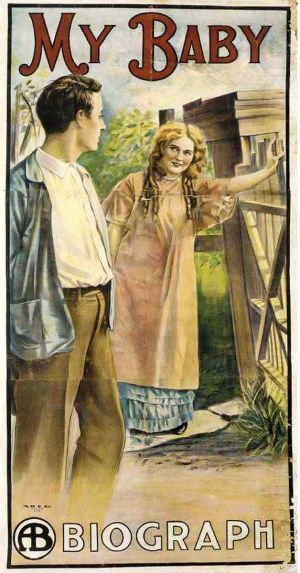
- Theatrical poster
- Directed by: D. W. Griffith; Frank Powell
- Written by: Anita Loos
- Starring: Mary Pickford
- Cinematography: G. W. Bitzer
- Distributed by: General Film Company
- Release date: November 14, 1912
- Running time: 17 minutes
- Country: United States
- Language: Silent (English intertitles)

My Baby is a 1912 American short comedy film directed by D. W. Griffith and Frank Powell. Prints of the film exist in the film archives of the Museum of Modern Art and the Library of Congress.

== Cast ==
- Mary Pickford as The Wife
- Henry B. Walthall as The Husband
- Eldean Stuart as The Baby
- W. Chrystie Miller as The Grandfather
- Alfred Paget as The Married Sister's Husband
- Madge Kirby as The Wife's Friend
- Lionel Barrymore as At Table
- Elmer Booth as At Table
- Clara T. Bracy as At Table
- John T. Dillon as Wedding Guest / At Table
- Dorothy Gish as Wedding Guest
- Lillian Gish
- Adolph Lestina as At Table
- Walter P. Lewis as Wedding Guest
- Joseph McDermott
- Walter Miller as Wedding Guest
- Jack Pickford as Wedding Guest
- W.C. Robinson as At Table

== See also ==
- Mary Pickford filmography
- Lionel Barrymore filmography
- Lillian Gish filmography
