= Hector Sarno =

American actor

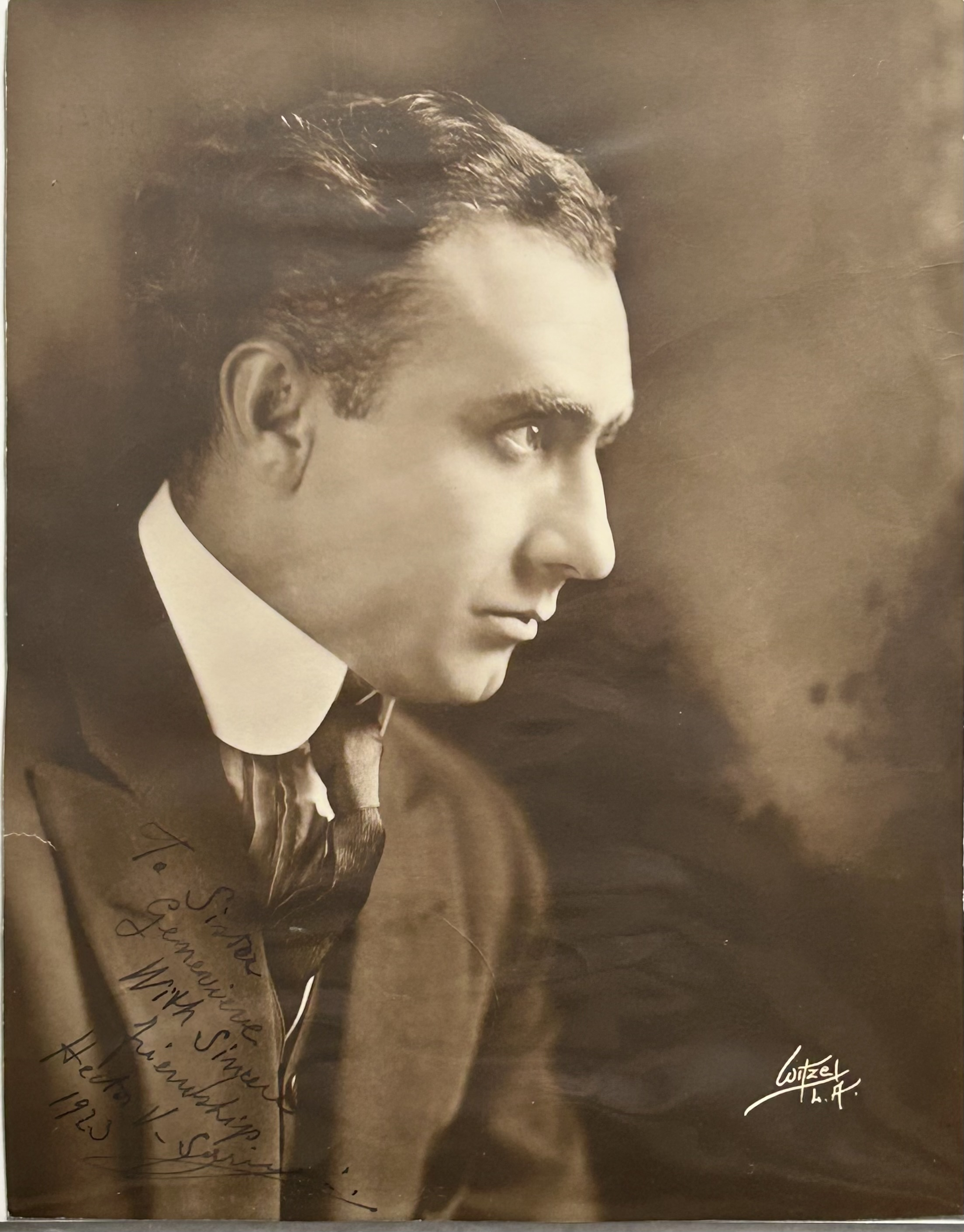
- Signed Photo
- Born: 24 April 1880; Naples, Kingdom of Italy (present-day Italy)
- Died: 16 December 1953 (aged 73); Pasadena, California, US
- Occupation: Actor
- Years active: 1912–1948

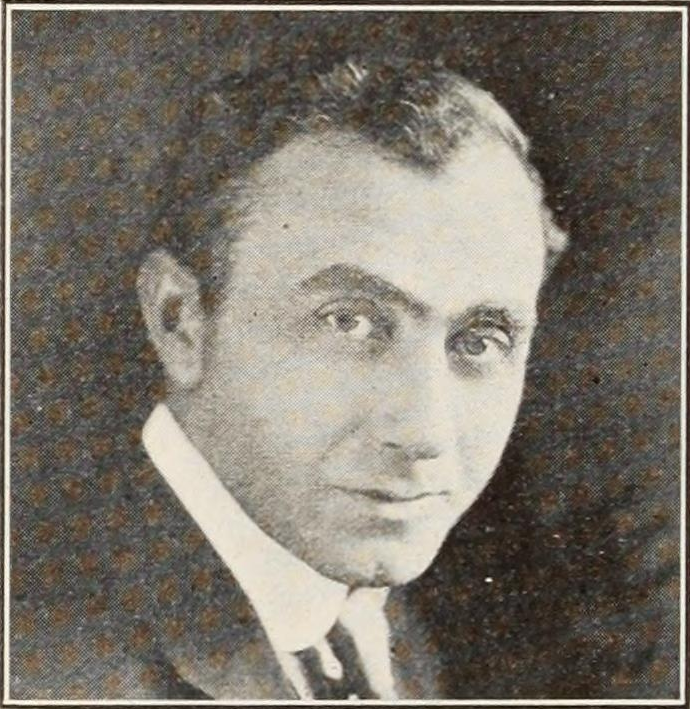
Hector Sarno c. 1920

Hector V. Sarno (24 April 1880 – 16 December 1953) was an Italian-born American film actor who began in the silent era. He appeared in more than 180 films between 1912 and 1948. He was born in Naples, Italy and died in Pasadena, California.

== Partial filmography ==
- My Hero (1912)
- Heredity (1912)
- The Chief's Blanket (1912)
- Blind Love (1912)
- The Detective's Stratagem (1913)
- The Law and His Son (1913)
- The Mistake (1913)
- The Stolen Bride (1913)
- Pirate Gold (1913)
- Under the Gaslight (1914)
- Graft (1915)
- The Black Sheep of the Family (1916)
- Guilty (1916)
- The Plow Woman (1917)
- The Island of Desire (1917)
- Madame Du Barry (1917)
- The Rose of Blood (1917)
- Some Boy! (1917)
- Go West, Young Man (1918)
- Heart of the Sunset (1918)
- A Little Sister of Everybody (1918)
- The Island of Intrigue (1919)
- The Gray Wolf's Ghost (1919)
- The Forfeit (1919)
- Rio Grande (1920)
- Roman Candles (1920)
- Cheated Hearts (1921)
- Diamonds Adrift (1921)
- Conflict (1921)
- The Wise Kid (1922)
- Do and Dare (1922)
- While Justice Waits (1922)
- Tom Mix in Arabia (1922)
- The Girl of the Golden West (1923)
- Ashes of Vengeance (1923)
- The Song of Love (1923)
- Stepping Fast (1923)
- The Sea Hawk (1924)
- As Man Desires (1925)
- Cobra (1925)
- The Girl from Montmartre (1926)
- The Temptress (1926)
- Her Sacrifice (1926)
- The Climbers (1927)
- The King of Kings (1927)
- The Noose (1928)
- Street Angel (1928)
- Women Everywhere (1930)
- Men Without Law (1930)
- The Pride of the Legion (1932)
- Flight into Nowhere (1938)
