= J-U-N-K =

1920 film

- Produced by: Morris R. Schlank
- Starring: See below
- Release date: 1920
- Running time: 2 reels
- Country: United States

J-U-N-K is a 1920 American film produced by Morris R. Schlank.

== Cast ==
- Madge Kirby as A society bud
- Jim Welch as Her father
- John J. Richardson as A Count
- Vernon Dent as The junk dealer
- Hank Mann as His helper
