= Melvin Mayo =

American actor and director

Melvin Mayo was an American actor and director. He worked for Balboa and Lubin. He portrayed Jim West in the 1915 film Jim West, Gambler and had the title role in the 1916 film A Modern Paul.

He appeared in silent horror films.

== Filmography ==
- The Stolen Yacht (1914) featuring the Fulton Shipyard
- The Twig is Bent (1915), Lubin film
- Saved from the Harem (1915) as Ezra Hickman
- Meg O' the Cliffs (1915)
- An Ambassador From the Dead (1915)
- Jim West, Gambler (1915) as Jim West
- A Song from the Heart (1916) as Otto Ritter
- Soldier Sons
- The Crash (1916)
- A Lesson in Labor (1916) as John Seward II
- The Gulf Between (1916) as Vorec
- A Sister to Cain
- The Return of James Jerome (1916)
- The Wheat and the Chaff
- A Modern Paul (1916), title role
- Brand's Daughter (1917) as Baron Norvinsk
- Tears and Smiles (1917) as Marie's Father
- Mentioned in Confidence (1917) as Robert Manning

=== Director ===
- None So Blind (1916), director, adapted from a story by C. A. Frambers
- Jack Straws (1916), director under the supervision of Captain Wilbert Melville, story by Josephine McLaughlin
- Love is Law (1916), director, he also acted as Roscoe, an "Indian" trader in the film
