= The One She Loved =

1912 film

- Directed by: D. W. Griffith
- Written by: George Hennessy
- Starring: Henry B. Walthall
- Cinematography: G. W. Bitzer
- Distributed by: General Film Company; Moving Pictures Sales Agency
- Release date: October 21, 1912
- Running time: 17 minutes (16 frame/s)
- Country: United States
- Language: Silent (English intertitles)

The One She Loved is a 1912 American silent drama film directed by D. W. Griffith. The film, by the Biograph Company, was shot in Fort Lee, New Jersey when many early film studios in America's first motion picture industry were based there at the beginning of the 20th century. A print of The One She Loved exists.

== Cast ==
- Henry B. Walthall as The Husband
- Mary Pickford as The Wife
- Lionel Barrymore as The Neighbor
- Kate Bruce as The Neighbor's Wife
- Gertrude Bambrick as The Stenographer
- Madge Kirby as The Nurse
- Harry Carey as The Neighbor's Friend
- Lillian Gish
- Eldean Stuart as The Baby

== See also ==
- Harry Carey filmography
- D. W. Griffith filmography
- Lillian Gish filmography
- Lionel Barrymore filmography
