= None So Blind (1916 film) =

None So Blind is a 1916 American silent feature film directed by Melvin Mayo. A Lubin film, it was written by C. A. Frambers (Clarence A. Frambers). Direction was supervised by Captain Wilbert Melville. It is "a condensation of thrills into three acts." The General Film Company distributed the film.

The film, released in April 1916, had 3 reels. The plot concerns "the building of a submarine", and the attempt to compromise the Navy lieutenant inspector by a "dishonest constructor".

== Cast ==
- Princess Mona Darkfeather as Ukana
- Evelyn Page as Gladys Remington
- Adelaide Bronti as Watson
- Ruth Saville as Madge, a secretary
- Walter Spencer
- Cecil Van Auker (C. K. Van Aucker) as Milton Hesser

== Reception ==
Moving Picture World also praised the film, finding the subject "reasonably entertaining". Another positive review, in Nickelodeon, praised Ruth Saville's interpretation.
