= Harry Hyde (actor) =

American actor

- Occupation: Film actor
- Years active: 1910–1920

Harry Hyde (fl. 1910–1920) was a silent film actor who appeared in 73 American films during the decade from 1910 to 1920, most notably as Mabel Normand's character's suitor in D.W. Griffith's 1911 drama Her Awakening. He also wrote the screenplay for The Sentimental Sister, a Blanche Sweet vehicle produced in 1914.

== Biography ==
As was frequently the case during the dawn of cinema, Hyde's roles ran the gamut from leading man to unbilled extra, sometimes in the same week. He portrayed Mary's suitor in D.W. Griffith's The Perfidy of Mary (1913) with Dorothy Gish, Mae Marsh, and Lionel Barrymore.

He played Blanche Sweet's character's cuckolded husband in Griffith's Blind Love (1912), in which she deserts her marriage for another man, has a baby, then realizes that she should have stayed with her husband (Hyde) and attempts to return to him.

He was gay.

== Filmography ==
- The Lesser Evil (1912)
- A Voice from the Deep (1912)
- The Root of Evil (film) (1912)
- Death's Marathon (1913)
- The Mistake (1913)
- Red Hicks Defies the World (1913)
- Love in an Apartment Hotel (1913)
- The Mothering Heart (1913)
- Brute Force (1914 film) (1914)
- Judith of Bethulia (1914)
