= My Hero (1912 film) =

1912 film

- Directed by: D. W. Griffith
- Written by: D. W. Griffith
- Starring: Dorothy Gish
- Cinematography: G. W. Bitzer
- Distributed by: General Film Company
- Release date: December 12, 1912
- Running time: 17 minutes
- Country: United States
- Language: Silent (English intertitles)

My Hero is a 1912 American short silent Western film directed by D. W. Griffith and starring Dorothy Gish.

== Cast ==
- Dorothy Gish as The Young Woman
- Walter P. Lewis as The Young Woman's Father (credited as Walter Lewis)
- Robert Harron as The Young Man
- Henry B. Walthall as Charlie "Indian Charlie"
- Lionel Barrymore
- Kate Bruce as The Young Woman's Mother (unconfirmed)
- W. Christy Cabanne as Settler
- Harry Carey as Indian
- John T. Dillon as Man In Room
- Frank Evans as Settler
- Frank Lanning as Indian
- J. Jiquel Lanoe as Settler
- Adolph Lestina as Settler
- Charles Hill Mailes as Indian
- Alfred Paget as Indian
- W. C. Robinson as Indian / Man In Room
- Hector Sarno as Indian (credited as Hector V. Sarno)
- Charles West as Settler (credited as Charles H. West)
