= Adolph Lestina =

American actor (1861–1923)

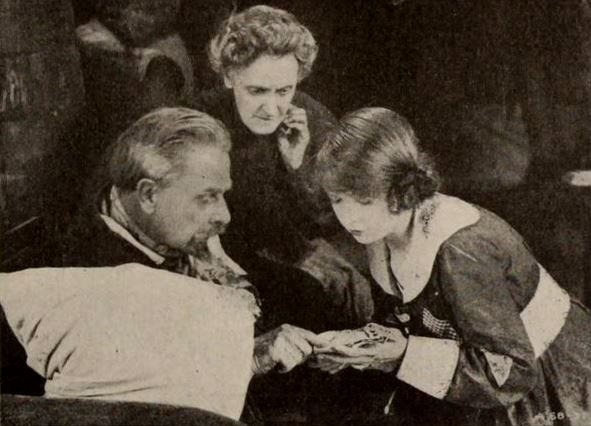
Still from The Greatest Thing in Life

Adolph Lestina (1861 – August 23, 1923) was an American stage and film actor who was a member of D. W. Griffith's stock company of film actors.

== Career ==
He received positive notice for his performance in Justin McCarthy's If I Were King and in Laurence Irving's The Fool Hath Said There Is No God.

Lestina's performance in the play A Citizen's Home was noted as being "sympathetic".

Lestina was credited with "discovering" D. W. Griffith. "This gentleman saw to it that young Griffith played the role of Old Man Marks in The Lights o' London with the Meffert company [...] The gentleman who "discovered Griffith as an actor, Adolphe Lestina, later appeared in many D. W. Griffith film productions, including Hearts of the World (1918) and The Love Flower (1920)". Griffith, speaking of his time with the Meffert Stock Company, said that Lestina told him that to be a playwright, one first had to be an actor.

== Personal life ==
Adolph Lestina was married to Bessie Lee Lestina.

He died of heart disease in New Rochelle, New York on August 23, 1923.

== Broadway credits ==
- Children of the Ghetto (October 16, 1899 – December 1899)
- The School for Scandal (January 31, 1902 – January 31, 1902)
- The Eternal City (November 17, 1902 – February 1903)
- Our American Cousin (January 27, 1908 – April 25, 1908)
- A Citizen's Home (October 1, 1909 – October 1909)

== Filmography ==
- On the Reef (1910) (Short) as The Priest
- The Cord of Life (1909) (Short)
- The Honor of His Family (1910) (Short) as Servant
- The Last Deal (1910) (Short) as At Card Game
- Winning Back His Love (1910) (Short) as A Waiter
- The Two Paths (1911) (Short) as The Tempter
- The Italian Barber (1911) (Short) as Buying Newspapers / At Ball
- His Trust: The Faithful Devotion and Self-Sacrifice of an Old Negro Servant (1911) (Short) as Black Servant / Confederate Soldier
- His Trust Fulfilled (1911) (Short) as Freed Slave
- Fate's Turning (1911) (Short) as The Minister
- A Wreath of Orange Blossoms (1911) (Short) as At Party
- Heart Beats of Long Ago (1911) (Short) as Courtier
- What Shall We Do with Our Old? (1911) (Short) as The Doctor
- The Lily of the Tenements (1911) (Short) as One of the Father's Friends
- A Decree of Destiny (1911) (Short) as The Doctor
- Conscience (1911) (Short) as Detective
- Through Darkened Vales (1911) (Short) as Oculist's Assistant
- The Miser's Heart (1911) (Short) as The Miser
- A Woman Scorned (1911) (Short) as The Sneak Thief
- The Failure (1911) (Short) as The Bank Manager / In Tavern
- A Terrible Discovery (1911) (Short) as A Thug / One of the District Attorney's Friends
- The Old Bookkeeper (1912) (Short) as In Office
- The Sunbeam (1912) (Short) as 1st Health Inspector
- A String of Pearls (1912) (Short) as The Doctor
- A Lodging for the Night (1912) (Short) as A Deputy
- The Narrow Road (1912) (Short) as The Bartender
- The Inner Circle (1912) (Short) as The Widower
- So Near, Yet So Far (1912) (Short) as In Club
- A Feud in the Kentucky Hills (1912) (Short) as Second Clan Member
- The Chief's Blanket (1912) (Short) as The Doctor
- The Musketeers of Pig Alley (1912) (Short) as The Bartender / On Street
- My Baby (1912) (Short) as At Table
- My Hero (1912) (Short) as Settler
- The Burglar's Dilemma (1912) (Short) as The Butler
- The God Within (1912) (Short) as In Other Town
- An Adventure in the Autumn Woods (1913) (Short) as At Trading Post
- Brothers (1913) (Short) as The Doctor
- A Chance Deception (1913) (Short) as The Visitor
- Love in an Apartment Hotel (1913) (Short) as The Young Woman's Father
- Fate (1913) (Short) as In Bar
- A Welcome Intruder (1913) (Short) as The Construction Boss
- The Lady and the Mouse (1913) (Short) as The Doctor
- A Timely Interception (1913) (Short) as Uncle James's Friend
- Red Hicks Defies the World (1913) (Short) as Second Creditor
- The Mothering Heart (1913) (Short) as The Doctor / Club Patron
- Her Mother's Oath (1913) (Short) as The Justice of the Peace / In Church
- The Coming of Angelo (1913) (Short) as Teresa's Father
- The Adopted Brother (1913) (Short) as The Sheriff – Outside Sheriff's Office
- Her Wedding Bell (1913) (Short) as Wedding Guest
- Fruits of Desire (1916) as Rev. Courtenay
- The Yellow Passport (1916) as Chief of Police
- Hearts of the World (1918) as The Grandfather
- The Hun Within (1918) as Beth's father
- Battling Jane (1918) as Mr. Pollett
- The Greatest Thing in Life (1918) as Leo Peret
- A Romance of Happy Valley (1919) as Vinegar Watkins
- The Girl Who Stayed at Home (1919) as Mr. France
- Scarlet Days (1919) as Randolph's Friend
- The Idol Dancer (1920) as Black Slave
- Mary Ellen Comes to Town (1920) as Col. Fairacres
- The Love Flower (1920) as Bevan's Old Servant
- Orphans of the Storm (1921) as doctor
