= List of lost silent films (1925–1929) =

This is a list of lost silent films that were released from 1925 to 1929.

Year	Film	Director	Cast	Notes	Ref
1925	The Ace of Spades	Henry MacRae	William Desmond, Mary McAllister	A 15-part Western serial.	
1925	The Adventurous Sex	Charles Giblyn	Clara Bow, Herbert Rawlinson, Earle Williams	Six reels, 58–60 minutes.	
1925	Corazón Aymara	Pedro Sambarino		First Bolivian fiction feature film.	
1925	The Dark Angel	George Fitzmaurice	Vilma Bánky, Ronald Colman	Named by the New York Times as one of the ten best films of 1925.	
1925	The Fighting Heart	John Ford	George O'Brien, Billie Dove		
1925	The Fighting Ranger	Jay Marchant	Jack Dougherty, Eileen Sedgwick	A Western serial with 18 episodes.	
1925	The Great Circus Mystery	Jay Marchant	Joe Bonomo, Louise Lorraine	A 15-chapter serial.	
1925	Heartbound	Glen Lambert	Ranger Bill Miller, Bess True	An early 3D film (see List of 3D films (1914–2004)).	
1925	His Supreme Moment	George Fitzmaurice	Blanche Sweet, Ronald Colman, Anna May Wong	Some sequences had 2 strip Technicolor.	
1925	Idaho	Robert F. Hill	Mahlon Hamilton, Vivian Rich	A ten-part serial.	
1925	José's Big Lunch	Chano Urueta			
1925	Kiss Me Again	Ernst Lubitsch	Marie Prevost, Monte Blue, Clara Bow	A popular film by Warner Bros. Pictures.	
1925	The Lawful Cheater	Frank O'Connor	Clara Bow, David Kirby, Raymond McKee		
1925	A Man of Iron	Whitman Bennett	Lionel Barrymore, Mildred Harris		
1925	Man spielt nicht mit der Liebe (One Does Not Play with Love)	Georg Wilhelm Pabst	Werner Krauss		
1925	New Brooms	William C. deMille	Bessie Love, Neil Hamilton, Phyllis Haver		
1925	Perils of the Wild	Francis Ford	Joe Bonomo, Margaret Quimby	A serial consisting of 15 episodes.	
1925	Play Ball	Spencer Gordon Bennet	Walter Miller, Allene Ray	A ten-part serial.	
1925	The Prophecy of the Lake	José Maria Velasco Maidana		Second completed Bolivian fiction feature film; banned and never released.	
1925	The Scarlet Streak	Henry MacRae	Jack Dougherty, Lola Todd	A serial of ten episodes.	
1925	That Royle Girl	D. W. Griffith	W. C. Fields	Griffith used 24 airplane propellers to create a tornado sequence.	
1925	Thank You	John Ford	Alec B. Francis, Jacqueline Logan		
1925	A Thief in Paradise	George Fitzmaurice	Doris Kenyon, Ronald Colman, Aileen Pringle		
1925	The Tower of Lies	Victor Seastrom	Lon Chaney, Norma Shearer, Ian Keith		
1925	We Moderns	John Francis Dillon	Colleen Moore	A sequel to Moore's Flaming Youth of 1923.	
1925	Wild Justice	Chester Franklin	Peter the Great, George Sherwood, Frank Hagney, Frances Teague		
1925	Wild West	Robert F. Hill	Jack Mulhall, Helen Ferguson	A ten-chapter serial.	
1926	Arirang	Na Woon-gyu	Na Woon-gyu	A copy of this Korean film was rumored to have been in the possession of a Japanese collector who died in February 2005.	
1926	The Bar C Mystery	Robert F. Hill	Dorothy Phillips, Wallace MacDonald	A ten-part Western serial.	
1926	The Boy Friend	Monta Bell	Marceline Day, John Harron, Gwen Lee		
1926	The Cat's Pajamas	William A. Wellman	Betty Bronson		
1926	The Dice Woman	Edward Dillon, Edmund F. Bernoudy	Priscilla Dean		
1926	The Fighting Marine	Spencer Gordon Bennet	Gene Tunney, Marjorie Day	A ten-episode serial.	
1926	Fighting with Buffalo Bill	Ray Taylor	William F. Cody, George H. Plympton, William Lord Wright		
1926	The Great Gatsby	Herbert Brenon	Warner Baxter, Lois Wilson, Neil Hamilton	Only a minute-long trailer has survived. Despite extensive searches for the film and rumours of surviving copies existing in obscure archives, no other trace of the film has been found.	
1926	Gwiaździsta eskadra	Leonard Buczkowski	Barbara Orwid	A story of Americans in the Polish 7th Air Escadrille fighting against the Bolsheviks during the Polish-Soviet War in 1918–1920. All copies were stolen or destroyed by the Soviet Army after 1945.	
1926	Hearts and Fists	Lloyd Ingraham	John Bowers, Marguerite De La Motte, Alan Hale Sr.	One of three known films from H.C. Weaver Studios	
1926	London	Herbert Wilcox	Dorothy Gish	It is on the BFI 75 Most Wanted list of missing British feature films.	
1926	Meet the Prince	Joseph Henabery	Joseph Schildkraut, Marguerite De La Motte		
1926	The Radio Detective	William James Craft, William A. Crinley	Jack Dougherty, Margaret Quimby	A serial of ten episodes.	
1926	The Road to Glory	Howard Hawks	May McAvoy	Hawks's first official film as a director.	
1926	Snowed In	Spencer Gordon Bennet	Allene Ray, Walter Miller	A ten-episode serial.	
1926	A Social Celebrity	Malcolm St. Clair	Adolphe Menjou, Louise Brooks	In 1957, one print deteriorated, and later another was lost in a fire.	
1926	Stop, Look and Listen	Larry Semon	Oliver Hardy		
1926	Strings of Steel	Henry MacRae	William Desmond, Eileen Sedgwick		
1926	Sweeney Todd	George Dewhurst	G.A. Baughan	The first of several film adaptations of the Sweeney Todd character.	
1926	Swell Hogan	Ralph Graves	Ralph Graves	The first film produced by Howard Hughes, who hated the film and may have ordered it destroyed.	
1926	A Trip to Chinatown	Robert P. Kerr	Margaret Livingston, Earle Foxe, J. Farrell MacDonald		
1926	The Winking Idol	Francis Ford	William Desmond, Eileen Sedgwick	A Western serial in ten parts.	
1926	A Woman of the Sea	Josef von Sternberg	Edna Purviance	Produced by Charlie Chaplin, he destroyed it in 1933 as a tax write-off. Production stills survive.	
1927	The American	J. Stuart Blackton	Bessie Love, Charles Ray	Made in the experimental widescreen process Natural Vision. Never released theatrically.	
1927	Babe Comes Home	Ted Wilde	Babe Ruth, Anna Q. Nilsson	Babe Ruth stars as himself in this feature-length comedy.	
1927	Blake of Scotland Yard	Robert F. Hill	Hayden Stevenson, Grace Cunard	A 12-episode serial.	
1927	Broadway Nights	Joseph C. Boyle	Lois Wilson, Sam Hardy, Barbara Stanwyck, Ann Sothern	A silent romantic drama film.	
1927	The Broncho Twister	Orville O. Dull	Tom Mix, Helene Costello		
1927	The Callahans and the Murphys	George W. Hill	Marie Dressler, Polly Moran	This film caused some controversy because of its stereotypical depiction of Irish people. MGM withdrew the picture from distribution.	
1927	The Chinese Parrot	Paul Leni	Marian Nixon, Florence Turner, Hobart Bosworth		
1927	The City Gone Wild	James Cruze	Louise Brooks	Early gangster film, with titles by Herman J. Mankiewicz.	
1927	The Conjure Woman	Oscar Micheaux	Evelyn Preer		
1927	The Devil Dancer	Fred Niblo	Gilda Gray, Clive Brook, Anna May Wong		
1927	Evening Clothes	Luther Reed	Adolphe Menjou, Louise Brooks		
1927	The Fire Fighters	Jacques Jaccard	Jack Dougherty, Helen Ferguson	A ten-chapter serial.	
1927	For the Love of Mike	Frank Capra	Claudette Colbert	Colbert's film debut.	
1927	The Gateway of the Moon	John Griffith Wray	Dolores del Río, Walter Pidgeon		
1927	Good as Gold	Scott R. Dunlap	Buck Jones, Frances Lee, Carl Miller	Based on the short story "The Owner of the Aztec" by Murray Leinster published in Western Magazine (5 May 1926).	
1927	A Harp in Hock	Renaud Hoffman	Rudolph Schildkraut, Junior Coghlan, May Robson, Bessie Love		
1927	Hats Off	Hal Yates	Laurel and Hardy		
1927	The Heart of the Yukon	W.S. Van Dyke	John Bowers, Anne Cornwall, Edward Hearn	One of three known films from H.C. Weaver Studios	
1927	Heebee Jeebees	Anthony Mack	Our Gang: (Joe Cobb, Allen "Farina" Hoskins, Jay R. Smith, Jackie Condon, Harry Spear, Jean Darling, Bobby "Wheezer" Hutchins, Pete the Pup)		
1927	Heroes of the Wild	Harry S. Webb	Jack Hoxie, Josephine Hill	A ten-episode serial.	
1927	The House Behind the Cedars	Oscar Micheaux	Shingzie Howard, Lawrence Chenault, C. D. Griffith	A race film, it was banned in Virginia.	
1927	London After Midnight	Tod Browning	Lon Chaney, Marceline Day	Chaney played both the villain, and the detective hunting him. Reconstructed in 2002 using stills and original script. Last known print destroyed in the 1965 MGM vault fire.	
1927	The Magic Flame	Henry King	Ronald Colman, Vilma Bánky		
1927	The Masked Menace	Arch Heath	Larry Kent, Jean Arthur	Filmed in Berlin, New Hampshire.	
1927	Melting Millions	Spencer Gordon Bennet	Allene Ray, Walter Miller	A ten-episode serial.	
1927	The Mountain Eagle	Alfred Hitchcock	Nita Naldi, Bernhard Goetzke	The film was poorly received and criticised for its lack of realism, and Hitchcock himself was relieved that the film was lost.	
1927	Mumsie	Herbert Wilcox	Pauline Frederick, Nelson Keys, Herbert Marshall		
1927	On Guard	Arch Heath	Cullen Landis, Muriel Kingston	A ten-part serial.	
1927	The Potters	Fred C. Newmeyer	W. C. Fields		
1927	Rolled Stockings	Richard Rosson	Louise Brooks	The film features the Paramount Junior stars, and was filmed in Berkeley, California.	
1927	The Story of the Flag	Anson Dyer		The first full-length British animated film, it is on the BFI 75 Most Wanted list.	
1927	Sword of Penitence	Yasujirō Ozu	Saburō Azuma	Ozu's first film as director.	
1927	Tip Toes	Herbert Wilcox	Dorothy Gish, Will Rogers	On the BFI 75 Most Wanted list.	
1927	The Gay Defender	Gregory La Cava	Richard Dix, Thelma Todd, Fred Kohler, Jerry Mandy		
1927	The Trail of the Tiger	Henry MacRae	Jack Dougherty, Frances Teague	A serial in ten parts.	
1927	Two Flaming Youths	John Waters	W. C. Fields, Chester Conklin, Mary Brian		
1927	Yale vs. Harvard	Robert F. McGowan	Our Gang: (Joe Cobb, Allen "Farina" Hoskins, Jay R. Smith, Jackie Condon, Harry Spear, Bobby "Wheezer" Hutchins, Jean Darling, Pete the Pup)	Earliest Our Gang film to be entirely lost.	
1928	Anybody Here Seen Kelly?	William Wyler	Bessie Love, Tom Moore		
1928	The Awakening	Victor Fleming	Vilma Bánky, Walter Byron		
1928	The Actress	Sidney Franklin	Sidney Franklin	Destroyed in the 1965 MGM vault fire.	
1928	Baiyun Ta (The White Cloud Pagoda)	Zhang Shichuan	Ruan Lingyu		
1928	The Big City	Tod Browning	Lon Chaney, Betty Compson	Destroyed in the 1965 MGM vault fire. A trailer survives, but it does not include any footage from the film.	
1928	The Burning of the Red Lotus Temple	Zhang Shichuan	Die Hu, Jie Tang	Considered to be one of the longest films ever made, released in 19 parts from 1928 to 1931 with a total running time of 27 hours. Notable for being the first martial arts film.	
1928	The Czarina's Secret	R. William Neill	Olga Baclanova, Sally Rand	Technicolor short subject, part of the Metro-Goldwyn-Mayer "Great Events" series.	
1928	The Drag Net	Josef von Sternberg	William Powell, Evelyn Brent		
1928	Dry Martini	Harry d'Abbadie d'Arrast	Mary Astor		
1928	Edison, Marconi & Co.	Anthony Mack	Our Gang: (Bobby "Wheezer" Hutchins, Jay R. Smith, Allen "Farina" Hoskins, Joe Cobb, Harry Spear, Jackie Condon, Pete the Pup)		
1928	The Fleet's In	Malcolm St. Clair	Clara Bow, James Hall	With talking sequences and sound effects.	
1928	4 Devils	F. W. Murnau	Janet Gaynor	Named by the New York Times as one of the ten best films of 1928.	
1928	Gentlemen Prefer Blondes	Mal St. Clair	Alice White, Ruth Taylor	The first version of the Anita Loos story.	
1928	Growing Pains	Anthony Mack, Robert F. McGowan	Our Gang: Mary Ann Jackson, Bobby "Wheezer" Hutchins, Allen "Farina" Hoskins, Joe Cobb, Jay R. Smith, Harry Spear, Jackie Condon, Jean Darling, Pete the Pup		
1928	The Hawk's Nest	Benjamin Christensen	Milton Sills, Doris Kenyon, Sōjin Kamiyama		
1928	Ladies of the Mob	William Wellman	Clara Bow, Richard Arlen		
1928	The Last Moment	Paul Fejos	Georgia Hale, Otto Matieson	Experimental silent film told without subtitles.	
1928	The Legion of the Condemned	William A. Wellman	Fay Wray, Gary Cooper		
1928	Mark of the Frog	Arch Heath	Donald Reed; Margaret Morris	A ten-episode serial.	
1928	Napoleon's Barber	John Ford	Otto Matieson, Natalie Golitzen		
1928	Pirates of the Pines	J. C. Cook	George O'Hara, Rita Roma	A serial with ten episodes.	
1928	A Princess of Destiny	Tom Terriss	Anders Randolf, Doris Lloyd, Dorothy Gould, Lloyd Ingraham, Fairfax Burger	Technicolor short subject, part of the Metro-Goldwyn-Mayer "Great Events" series.	
1928	The Street of Sin	Mauritz Stiller	Emil Jannings, Fay Wray		
1928	Tarzan the Mighty	Jack Nelson, Ray Taylor	Frank Merrill	The seventh Tarzan movie produced.	
1928	Thérèse Raquin	Jacques Feyder	Gina Manès, Hans Adalbert Schlettow, Jeanne Marie-Laurent		
1928	The Vanishing Rider	Ray Taylor	William Desmond, Ethlyne Clair	A serial of 12 parts.	
1928	The Vanishing West	Richard Thorpe	Jack Perrin, Eileen Sedgwick	A ten-episode serial.	
1928	Vultures of the Sea	Richard Thorpe	Johnnie Walker, Shirley Mason	A serial with ten chapters.	
1928	What Price Beauty?	Tom Buckingham	Nita Naldi, Natacha Rambova	Film was shot in May 1925, but not released until January 1928 due to distribution issues. Notable for being Myrna Loy's debut.	
1928	The Yellow Cameo	Spencer Gordon Bennet	Allene Ray, Edward Hearn		
1929	Barro Humano	Adhemar Gonzaga	Gracia Morena, Lelita Rosa, Eva Schnoor, Eva Nil		
1929	The Case of Lena Smith	Josef von Sternberg	Esther Ralston	Silent film withdrawn from circulation when talkies began to dominate. Only a 4-minute clip is known to exist.	
1929	The Crooked Billet	Adrian Brunel	Madeleine Carroll, Carlyle Blackwell, Miles Mander	On the BFI 75 Most Wanted list.	
1929	The Diamond Master	Jack Nelson	Hayden Stevenson, Louise Lorraine	A ten-part serial.	
1929	The Fatal Warning	Richard Thorpe	Ralph Graves, Helene Costello	Twelve-part mystery serial released by Mascot Pictures.	
1929	The Fire Detective	Spencer Gordon Bennet, Thomas Storey	Gladys McConnell, Hugh Allan	A serial with ten episodes.	
1929	Frontier Romance	Elmer Clifton	Allan Simpson, Nina Quartero, Arthur Clayton	The last of twelve short films produced in Technicolor as part of Metro-Goldwyn-Mayer's "Great Events" series.	.
1929	The Holy Terror	Anthony Mack, Robert F. McGowan	Our Gang: Mary Ann Jackson, Joe Cobb, Allen "Farina" Hoskins, Jean Darling, Bobby "Wheezer" Hutchins, Harry Spear, Pete the Pup		
1929	The Last Post	Dinah Shurey	John Longden, Frank Vosper, Cynthia Murtagh	On the BFI 75 Most Wanted list.	
1929	The Pirate of Panama	Ray Taylor	Jay Wilsey, Natalie Kingston	A serial in 12 parts.	
1929	The Wages of Sin	Oscar Micheaux	William A. Clayton, Jr., Bessie Givens	A race movie with an all-black cast.	
