= List of film serials by studio =

This is a list of film serials by studio, separated into those released by each of the five major studios, and the remaining minor studios.

The five major studios produced the greater number of serials. Of these the main studios are considered to be Columbia Pictures, Universal Pictures, and Republic Pictures. All three were active during the 1930s and 1940s. The other two major studios are Mascot Pictures, which later merged into Republic, and Pathé Exchange, which ceased serial production before the advent of sound.

== Major studios ==
These studios were the main producers of serials.

=== Columbia Pictures ===
Number	Serial title	Year	Chapters	Genre	Director	Cast	Notes
1	Jungle Menace	1937	15	Jungle	Harry L. Fraser and George Melford	Frank Buck	The first three Columbia serials were not produced by the studio. They were made independently by the Weiss Bros. studio and released by Columbia. Columbia established its own serial unit in 1938.
2	The Mysterious Pilot	1937	15	Aviation	Spencer Gordon Bennet	Frank Hawks	
3	The Secret of Treasure Island	1938	15	Mystery	Elmer Clifton	Don Terry	
4	The Great Adventures of Wild Bill Hickok	1938, reissued in 1949, 1958, and 1964	15	Western	Mack V. Wright and Sam Nelson	Gordon Elliott	First serial produced by the Columbia Pictures staff. The actor later known as Wild Bill Elliott was billed as "Gordon Elliott" in the original release; the billing was changed to "William Elliott" for the 1949 reissue. This was the only Columbia serial that was reissued to theaters three times; the last revival was in 1964.
5	The Spider's Web	1938, reissued in 1947	15	Superhero	Ray Taylor and James W. Horne	Warren Hull, Iris Meredith	The most popular serial of the year, encompassing all studios, according to a tally in Motion Picture Herald and its sister publication The Film Daily. The Spider's Web was such an exhibitor favorite that Columbia used it to launch a series of reissues in 1947.
6	Flying G-Men	1939	15	Aviation	Ray Taylor and James W. Horne	Robert Paige	
7	Mandrake the Magician	1939	12	Fantasy	Sam Nelson and Norman Deming	Warren Hull	
8	Overland with Kit Carson	1939, reissued in 1951	15	Western	Sam Nelson and Norman Deming	Bill Elliott	Temporarily the last serial produced by the Columbia staff. Independent producer Larry Darmour took over serial production with the next entry.
9	The Shadow	1940, reissued in 1947	15	Superhero; Mystery	James W. Horne	Victor Jory	
10	Terry and the Pirates	1940	15	Jungle; Fantasy	James W. Horne	William Tracy	
11	Deadwood Dick	1940	15	Western	James W. Horne	Don Douglas	
12	The Green Archer	1940, reissued in 1957	15	Mystery	James W. Horne	Victor Jory	
13	White Eagle	1941	15	Western	James W. Horne	Buck Jones	
14	The Spider Returns	1941, reissued in 1947	15	Superhero	James W. Horne	Warren Hull	
15	The Iron Claw	1941, reissued in 1958 and 1964	15	Mystery	James W. Horne	Charles Quigley	
16	Holt of the Secret Service	1941	15	Crime drama	James W. Horne	Jack Holt, Evelyn Brent	
17	Captain Midnight	1942	15	Aviation	James W. Horne	Dave O'Brien	
18	Perils of the Royal Mounted	1942	15	Northern	James W. Horne	Robert Stevens	Last of the Larry Darmour productions.
19	The Secret Code	1942, reissued in 1953	15	Crime drama	Spencer G. Bennet	Paul Kelly	Columbia's association with serial producer Larry Darmour and director James Horne lapsed when both men died in 1942. The studio again took over serial production, using its feature-film staff, beginning with The Secret Code.
20	The Valley of Vanishing Men	1942	15	Western	Spencer G. Bennet	Bill Elliott	
21	Batman	1943, reissued in 1958 and 1962	15	Superhero	Lambert Hillyer	Lewis Wilson, Douglas Croft	
22	The Phantom	1943	15	Superhero, Jungle	B. Reeves Eason	Tom Tyler	
23	The Desert Hawk	1944	15	Adventure	B. Reeves Eason	Gilbert Roland	
24	Black Arrow	1944, reissued in 1955 and 1966	15	Western	Lew Landers and (uncredited) B. Reeves Eason	Robert Scott, Adele Jergens	
25	Brenda Starr, Reporter	1945	13	Crime drama	Wallace Fox	Joan Woodbury	Independent producer Sam Katzman took over Columbia's serial production, and remained in charge for the duration of the serial unit.
26	The Monster and the Ape	1945, reissued in 1956 and 1962	15	Science fiction	Howard Bretherton	Robert Lowery	
27	Jungle Raiders	1945, reissued in 1953 and 1964	15	Jungle	Lesley Selander	Kane Richmond	
28	Who's Guilty?	1945	15	Mystery	Howard Bretherton and Wallace Grissell	Robert Kent	
29	Hop Harrigan	1946, reissued in 1956	15	Aviation	Derwin Abrahams	William Bakewell	
30	Chick Carter, Detective	1946	15	Crime drama	Derwin Abrahams	Lyle Talbot	
31	Son of the Guardsman	1946	15	Medieval	Derwin Abrahams	Bob Shaw	
32	Jack Armstrong	1947	15	Science fiction	Wallace Fox	John Hart	
33	The Vigilante	1947, reissued in 1957 and 1965	15	Western	Wallace Fox	Ralph Byrd	
34	The Sea Hound	1947, reissued in 1955	15	Maritime	[Walter B. Eason and Mack V. Wright	Buster Crabbe	
35	Brick Bradford	1947	15	Science fiction	Spencer Gordon Bennet and Thomas Carr	Kane Richmond	
36	Tex Granger	1948, reissued in 1959	15	Western	Derwin Abrahams	Robert Kellard	
37	Superman	1948	15	Superhero	Spencer Gordon Bennet and Thomas Carr	Kirk Alyn, Noel Neill	Columbia kept many of its older serials in theatrical circulation from 1947 to 1966 but, curiously, the two Superman serials were never reissued, probably owing to rights issues. The two Batman serials did return to theaters, twice each.
38	Congo Bill	1948, reissued in 1957	15	Adventure	Spencer Gordon Bennet and Thomas Carr	Don McGuire, Cleo Moore	
39	Bruce Gentry	1949	15	Science fiction	Spencer G. Bennet and Thomas Carr	Tom Neal	
40	Batman and Robin	1949, reissued in 1958 and 1965	15	Superhero	Spencer Gordon Bennet	Robert Lowery, Johnny Duncan	
41	Adventures of Sir Galahad	1950	15	Fantasy	Spencer Gordon Bennet	George Reeves	
42	Cody of the Pony Express	1950, reissued in 1961	15	Western	Spencer Gordon Bennet	Jock Mahoney (as "Jock O'Mahoney")	
43	Atom Man vs. Superman	1950	15	Adventure; Science Fiction	Spencer Gordon Bennet	Kirk Alyn, Lyle Talbot	
44	Pirates of the High Seas	1950, reissued in 1959	15	Action; Adventure; Crime	Spencer Gordon Bennet and Thomas Carr	Buster Crabbe	
45	Roar of the Iron Horse	1951, reissued in 1963	15	Western	Spencer Gordon Bennet and Thomas Carr	Jock Mahoney (as "Jock O'Mahoney")	
46	Mysterious Island	1951	15	Adventure; Science Fiction; Fantasy	Spencer Gordon Bennet	Richard Crane	
47	Captain Video: Master of the Stratosphere	1951, reissued in 1958 and 1963	15	Adventure; Horror; Science Fiction	Spencer Gordon Bennet	Judd Holdren	
48	King of the Congo	1952, reissued in 1960	15	Adventure; Fantasy	Spencer Gordon Bennet	Buster Crabbe	
49	Blackhawk	1952	15	Adventure; Horror; Science Fiction	Spencer Gordon Bennet	Kirk Alyn	
50	Son of Geronimo	1952, reissued in 1960	15	Western	Spencer Gordon Bennet	Clay Moore	
51	The Lost Planet	1953, reissued in 1960 and 1966	15	Horror; Science fiction	Spencer Gordon Bennet	Judd Holdren	
52	The Great Adventures of Captain Kidd	1953, reissued in 1961	15	Maritime	Derwin Abrahams and Charles S. Gould	Richard Crane	
53	Gunfighters of the Northwest	1954, reissued in 1963	15	Western	Spencer Gordon Bennet	Jock Mahoney (as "Jack Mahoney"), Clayton Moore	Filmed entirely outdoors. Originally intended as the final Columbia serial; see next entry.
54	Riding with Buffalo Bill	1954	15	Western	Spencer Gordon Bennet	Marshall Reed	In 1953 Sam Katzman had announced that he would no longer produce serials; Gunfighters of the Northwest was his last. When exhibitors objected, Katzman was forced to budget the serials back into his production schedules, and so he produced his last four serials with extremely low budgets. Entire chunks of older serials were reused, with new footage of leading players wearing costumes identical to those in the older serials. Riding with Buffalo Bill is based on two older serials, Deadwood Dick and The Valley of Vanishing Men.
55	Adventures of Captain Africa	1955, reissued in 1965	15	Superhero, Jungle	Spencer Gordon Bennet	John Hart	Conceived as Return of the Phantom, an aborted remake of the 1943 serial The Phantom. Filmed as Adventures of Captain Africa and Outlaws of the Desert, with additional footage from the older serials The Desert Hawk and Jungle Menace. The film was well into production when the producer learned that the studio no longer held the rights to the comic-strip character. Portions of the film were reshot, with actor John Hart wearing a more generic costume and "The Phantom" renamed "Captain Africa."
56	Perils of the Wilderness	1956, reissued in 1964	15	Western	Spencer Gordon Bennet	Dennis Moore	Based on the older serials Perils of the Royal Mounted and The Mysterious Pilot.
57	Blazing the Overland Trail	1956	15	Western	Spencer Gordon Bennet	Lee Roberts, Dennis Moore	Last serial produced by any studio. Based on the older serials White Eagle and Overland with Kit Carson.

=== Mascot Pictures ===
Note: Mascot later became part of Republic (see below)

Number (All)	Number (Sound Only)	Serial title	Year	Chapters	Genre	Director	Cast	Notes
Silent Serials
		The Silent Flyer	1926	10	Adventure	William James Craft	Malcolm McGregor	Produced by W. Ray Johnston's Rayart studio. Its success directly led to the creation of Mascot Pictures.
1		Heroes of the Wild	1927	10	Western	Harry S. Webb	Jack Hoxie	The first film from Mascot Pictures. The film is considered to be lost.
2		Isle of Sunken Gold	1927	10	Maritime	Harry S. Webb	Anita Stewart and Duke Kahanamoku	The film is considered to be lost.
3		The Golden Stallion	1927	10	Western	Harry S. Webb	Lefty Flynn and Joe Bonomo	
4		The Vanishing West	1928	10	Western	Richard Thorpe	Jack Perrin and Eileen Sedgwick	The film is considered to be lost.
5		Vultures of the Sea	1928	10	Maritime	Richard Thorpe	Johnnie Walker & Shirley Mason	The film is considered to be lost.
6		The Fatal Warning	1929	10	Mystery	Richard Thorpe	Helene Costello and Ralph Graves	The film is considered to be a lost film, with no prints known to exist.
Partial Sound Serials
7	1	The King of the Kongo	1929	10	Jungle; Fantasy	Richard Thorpe	Jacqueline Logan & Walter Miller	The first serial, of any production company, with synchronized sound. Released in both silent and part-talking versions.
All Sound Serials
8	2	The Lone Defender	1930	12	Western	Richard Thorpe	Rin Tin Tin and Walter Miller	
9	3	The Phantom of the West	1931	10	Western	D. Ross Lederman	Tom Tyler and William Desmond	
10	4	King of the Wild	1931	12	Jungle	B. Reeves Eason and Richard Thorpe	Walter Miller and Boris Karloff	
11	5	The Vanishing Legion	1931	12	Western	Ford Beebe and B. Reeves Eason	Harry Carey and Frankie Darro	
12	6	The Galloping Ghost	1931	12	Sports, Crime	B. Reeves Eason	"Red" Grange	
13	7	The Lightning Warrior	1931	12	Western	Benjamin H. Kline and Armand Schaefer	Rin Tin Tin	
14	8	The Shadow of the Eagle	1932	12	Aviation	Ford Beebe and B. Reeves Eason	John Wayne	
15	9	The Last of the Mohicans	1932	12	Western	Ford Beebe and B. Reeves Eason	Harry Carey	
16	10	The Hurricane Express	1932	12		J.P. McGowan and Armand Schaefer	John Wayne	
17	11	The Devil Horse	1932	12	Western	Otto Brower	Harry Carey andFrankie Darro	
18	12	The Whispering Shadow	1933	12	Crime, Thriller	Colbert Clark and Albert Herman	Bela Lugosi	
19	13	The Three Musketeers	1933	12		Colbert Clark and Armand Schaefer	John Wayne and Lon Chaney Jr.	
20	14	Fighting with Kit Carson	1933	12	Western	Colbert Clark and Armand Schaefer	Johnny Mack Brown & Betsy King Ross	
21	15	The Wolf Dog	1933	12	Western	Colbert Clark and Harry L. Fraser	Rin Tin Tin and Frankie Darro	
22	16	The Mystery Squadron	1933	12	Aviation	Colbert Clark and David Howard	Bob Steele and Guinn "Big Boy" Williams	
23	17	The Lost Jungle	1934	12	Jungle	David Howard and Armand Schaefer	Clyde Beatty and Cecilia Parker	
24	18	Burn 'Em Up Barnes	1934	12	Sports, Crime	Colbert Clark and Armand Schaefer	Jack Mulhall and Frankie Darro	
25	19	The Law of the Wild	1934	12	Western	B. Reeves Eason and Armand Schaefer	Rin Tin Tin	
26	20	Mystery Mountain	1934	12	Western	Otto Brower and B. Reeves Eason	Ken Maynard	
27	21	The Phantom Empire	1935	12	Western; Fantasy	Otto Brower and B. Reeves Eason	Gene Autry	Originally intended for Ken Maynard. Autry took the leading role, and became a star.
28	22	The Miracle Rider	1935	15	Western	Otto Brower and B. Reeves Eason	Tom Mix & Charles Middleton	Only serial and final film of Tom Mix.
29	23	The Adventures of Rex and Rinty	1935	12		B. Reeves Eason and Ford Beebe	Rex and Rin Tin Tin	
30	24	The Fighting Marines	1935	12		B. Reeves Eason and Joseph Kane	Grant Withers and Adrian Morris	

=== Pathé Exchange ===
Note: All of Pathé Exchange's serials were Silent

Number	Serial title	Year	Chapters	Genre	Director	Cast	Notes
With Wharton, Inc.
1	The Perils of Pauline	1914	20	Damsel in distress	Louis J. Gasnier and Donald MacKenzie	Pearl White	Also listed under Wharton Inc.
2	The Exploits of Elaine	1914	14	Damsel in distress	George B. Seitz	Pearl White	Also listed under Wharton Inc.
3	The New Exploits of Elaine	1915	10	Damsel in distress	Louis J. Gasnier, Leopold Wharton and Theodore Wharton	Pearl White	Also listed under Wharton Inc.
4	The Romance of Elaine	1915	12	Damsel in distress	George B. Seitz	Pearl White	Also listed under Wharton Inc. The film is considered to be lost.
With Astra Film Corporation
5	Pearl of the Army	1916	15	Damsel in distress	Edward José	Pearl White	Also listed under Astra Film Corporation
6	The Shielding Shadow	1916	15		Louis J. Gasnier and Donald MacKenzie		Also listed under Astra Film Corporation
7	The Fatal Ring	1917	20		George B. Seitz	Pearl White	Also listed under Astra Film Corporation
8	The Hidden Hand	1917	15		James Vincent		Also listed under Astra Film Corporation
9	The Mystery of the Double Cross	1917	15		Louis J. Gasnier and William Parke	Mollie King	Also listed under Astra Film Corporation
10	The Seven Pearls	1917	15		Louis J. Gasnier and Donald MacKenzie		Also listed under Astra Film Corporation
11	Hands Up!	1918	15	Jungle	Louis J. Gasnier and James W. Horne	Ruth Roland	Also listed under Astra Film Corporation
12	The House of Hate	1918	20		George B. Seitz	Pearl White	Also listed under Astra Film Corporation
13	The Adventures of Ruth	1919	15	Mystery	George Marshall	Ruth Roland	Also listed under Astra Film Corporation
14	Bound and Gagged	1919	10		George B. Seitz		Also listed under Astra Film Corporation
15	The Lightning Raider	1919	15		George B. Seitz	Pearl White	Also listed under Astra Film Corporation
16	Terror of the Range	1919	7	Western	Stuart Paton		Also listed under Astra Film Corporation
17	The Tiger's Trail	1919			Robert Ellis, Louis J. Gasnier, and Paul Hurst	Ruth Roland	Also listed under Astra Film Corporation
18	Daredevil Jack	1920	15		W.S. Van Dyke		Also listed under Astra Film Corporation
19	The Phantom Foe	1920	15		Bertram Millhauser		Also listed under Astra Film Corporation
20	Pirate Gold	1920	10	Maritime	George B. Seitz		Also listed under Astra Film Corporation
21	The Third Eye	1920	15		James W. Horne		Also listed under Astra Film Corporation
22	Trailed By Three	1920	15	Western	Perry N. Vekroff		Also listed under Astra Film Corporation
With Ruth Roland Serials
23	Ruth of the Rockies	1920	15	Western	George Marshall	Ruth Roland	Also listed under Ruth Roland Serials
Pathé Exchange Only
24	The Avenging Arrow	1921	15		William Bowman and W.S. Van Dyke	Ruth Roland	
25	Double Adventure	1921	15		W.S. Van Dyke		
26	The Fortieth Door	1924	10		George B. Seitz		
27	Galloping Hoofs	1924	10	Western	George B. Seitz		
28	Into the Net	1924	10		George B. Seitz		
29	Leatherstocking	1924	10	Western	George B. Seitz		
30	Ten Scars Make a Man	1924	10		William Parke		
31	The Way of a Man	1924	10	Western	George B. Seitz		
32	The Green Archer	1925	10	Mystery	Spencer Gordon Bennet		
33	The House Without a Key	1925	10	Mystery	Spencer Gordon Bennet		
34	Idaho	1925	10	Western	Robert F. Hill		
35	Sunken Silver	1925	10		Spencer Gordon Bennet		
36	Wild West	1925	10	Western	Robert F. Hill		
37	Play Ball	1925	10		Spencer Gordon Bennet		
38	The Bar-C Mystery	1926	10	Western	Robert F. Hill		
39	Casey of the Coast Guard	1926	10	Maritime			
40	The Fighting Marine	1926	10	Gene Tunney	Spencer Gordon Bennet		
41	Snowed In	1926	10		Spencer Gordon Bennet		
42	The Crimson Flash	1927	10		Arch Heath		
43	Hawk of the Hills	1927	10	Western	Spencer Gordon Bennet	Walter Miller and Allene Ray	
44	The Masked Menace	1927	10		Arch Heath		
45	Melting Millions	1927	10		Spencer Gordon Bennet		
46	On Guard	1927	10		Arch Heath		
47	Eagle of the Night	1928	10	Aviation	James F. Fulton		
48	The Man Without a Face	1928	10		Spencer Gordon Bennet		
49	Mark of the Frog	1928	10		Arch Heath		
50	The Terrible People	1928	10		Spencer Gordon Bennet		
51	The Tiger's Shadow	1928	10		Spencer Gordon Bennet		
52	The Yellow Cameo	1928	10		Spencer Gordon Bennet		
53	The Black Book	1929	10	Walter Miller and Allene Ray	Spencer Gordon Bennet		
54	The Fire Detective	1929	10	Gladys McConnell and Hugh Allan	Spencer Gordon Bennet		
55	Queen of the Northwoods	1929	10	Northern	Spencer Gordon Bennet	Walter Miller	

=== Republic Pictures ===
Number	Serial title	Year	Chapters	Genre	Director	Cast	Notes
1	Darkest Africa	1936	15	Jungle	B. Reeves Eason and Joseph Kane	Clyde Beatty	Semi-sequel to Mascot's The Lost Jungle. Reissued in 1949 as King of Jungleland.
2	Undersea Kingdom	1936, reissued in 1950	12	Fantasy	B. Reeves Eason and Joseph Kane	Ray Corrigan	
3	The Vigilantes Are Coming	1936	12	Western	Ray Taylor and Mack V. Wright	Robert Livingston and Kay Hughes	
4	Robinson Crusoe of Clipper Island	1936	14	Maritime	Ray Taylor and Mack V. Wright	Ray Mala	
5	Dick Tracy	1937	15	Crime	Ray Taylor and Alan James	Ralph Byrd	Based on the comic strip "Dick Tracy"
6	The Painted Stallion	1937	12	Western	Ray Taylor, Alan James and William Witney	Ray Corrigan	
7	S.O.S. Coast Guard	1937	12	Maritime, Science fiction	Alan James and William Witney	Ralph Byrd, Bela Lugosi	
8	Zorro Rides Again	1937	12	Western	William Witney and John English	John Carroll	Based on "Zorro" created by Johnston McCulley
9	The Lone Ranger	1938	15	Western	William Witney and John English	Lee Powell	Based on the radio series The Lone Ranger
10	The Fighting Devil Dogs	1938	12	Science fiction	William Witney and John English	Lee Powell, Herman Brix	
11	Dick Tracy Returns	1938, reissued in 1948	15	Crime	William Witney and John English	Ralph Byrd	Based on the comic strip "Dick Tracy"
12	Hawk of the Wilderness	1938	12	Jungle	William Witney and John English	Herman Brix, Ray Mala	Based on the novel by William L. Chester
13	The Lone Ranger Rides Again	1939	15	Western	William Witney and John English	Robert Livingston	Based on the radio series The Lone Ranger
14	Daredevils of the Red Circle	1939	12	Circus adventure	William Witney and John English	Charles Quigley, Herman Brix, David Sharpe	
15	Dick Tracy's G-Men	1939, reissued in 1955	15	Crime	William Witney and John English	Ralph Byrd, Phylis Isley	Based on the comic strip "Dick Tracy"
16	Zorro's Fighting Legion	1939, reissued in 1958	12	Western	William Witney and John English	Reed Hadley	Based on "Zorro" created by Johnston McCulley
17	Drums of Fu Manchu	1940	15	Yellow peril Mystery	William Witney and John English	Henry Brandon	Based on Fu Manchu created by Sax Rohmer
18	Adventures of Red Ryder	1940	12	Western	William Witney and John English	Don "Red" Barry	Based on the comic strip "Red Ryder"
19	King of the Royal Mounted	1940	12	Northern	William Witney and John English	Allan Lane	Based on the comic strip "King of the Royal Mounted"
20	Mysterious Doctor Satan	1940	15	Superhero	William Witney and John English	Eduardo Ciannelli, Robert Wilcox	Originally intended as a Superman serial. First original superhero film.
21	Adventures of Captain Marvel	1941, reissued in 1953 as Return of Captain Marvel	12	Superhero	William Witney and John English	Tom Tyler	Based on the Fawcett Comics character "Captain Marvel". First superhero film based on a comic strip.
22	Jungle Girl	1941, reissued in 1947	15	Jungle	William Witney and John English	Frances Gifford	Based on Nyoka the Jungle Girl by Edgar Rice Burroughs. Jungle Girl was the first Republic serial to be reissued to theaters. This was an economy measure: the studio cut back production from four new serials annually to three, and the fourth was now a re-release, sometimes retitled. After Republic discontinued serial production entirely in 1955, the studio reprinted older serials for theaters through March 1958.
23	King of the Texas Rangers	1941	12	Western	William Witney and John English	Slingin' Sammy Baugh	
24	Dick Tracy vs. Crime, Inc.	1941, reissued in 1952 as Dick Tracy vs. Phantom Empire	15	Crime	William Witney and John English	Ralph Byrd	Based on the comic strip "Dick Tracy"
25	Spy Smasher	1942	12	Spy, War	William Witney	Kane Richmond	Based on the Fawcett Comics character "Spy Smasher"
26	Perils of Nyoka	1942, reissued in 1952 as Nyoka and the Tigermen	15	Jungle; Fantasy	William Witney	Kay Aldridge, Clayton Moore	Loosely based on Nyoka the Jungle Girl by Edgar Rice Burroughs
27	King of the Mounties	1942	12	Northern	William Witney	Allan Lane	Based on the comic strip "King of the Royal Mounted"
28	G-Men vs The Black Dragon	1943	15	Spy, War	William Witney	Rod Cameron	
29	Daredevils of the West	1943	12	Western	John English	Allan Lane, Kay Aldridge	Unavailable until 2011; restored by the Serial Squadron
30	Secret Service in Darkest Africa	1943, reissued in 1954 as Manhunt in the African Jungles	15	Jungle	Spencer Gordon Bennet	Rod Cameron	
31	The Masked Marvel	1943	12	Superhero	Spencer Gordon Bennet	David Bacon	
32	Captain America	1944, reissued in 1953 as Return of Captain America	15	Superhero	Elmer Clifton and John English	Dick Purcell	Very loosely based on the Timely Comics character Captain America; the script had been intended for Fawcett character, Mr. Scarlet.
33	The Tiger Woman	1944, reissued in 1951 as Perils of the Darkest Jungle	12	Jungle	Spencer Gordon Bennet	Linda Stirling	
34	Haunted Harbor	1944, reissued in 1951 as Pirates' Harbor	15	Maritime; Fantasy	Spencer Gordon Bennet	Kane Richmond and Kay Aldridge	Based on the novel by Ewart Adamson.
35	Zorro's Black Whip	1944, reissued in 1957	12	Western, Superhero	Spencer Gordon Bennet	Linda Stirling	Based on "Zorro" created by Johnston McCulley
36	Manhunt of Mystery Island	1945, reissued in 1956	15	Pirate, Science fiction	Spencer Gordon Bennet	Linda Stirling	
37	Federal Operator 99	1945, reissued in 1956	12	Crime	Spencer Gordon Bennet, Yakima Canutt, and Wallace Grissell	Marten Lamont	
38	The Purple Monster Strikes	1945, reissued in 1957	15	Science fiction	Spencer Gordon Bennet and Fred C. Brannon	Dennis Moore and Linda Stirling	
39	The Phantom Rider	1946, reissued in 1954 as Ghost Riders of the West	12	Western	Spencer Gordon Bennet and Fred C. Brannon	Robert Kent and Peggy Stewart	
40	King of the Forest Rangers	1946	12	Adventure	Spencer Gordon Bennet and Fred C. Brannon		
41	Daughter of Don Q	1946	12	Crime	Spencer Gordon Bennet and Fred C. Brannon	Kirk Alyn	
42	The Crimson Ghost	1946	12	Science fiction	William Witney and Fred C. Brannon	Clayton Moore and Linda Stirling	
43	Son of Zorro	1947, reissued in 1957	13	Western, Superhero	Spencer Gordon Bennet and Fred C. Brannon		Based on "Zorro" created by Johnston McCulley
44	Jesse James Rides Again	1947, reissued in 1955	13	Western	Fred C. Brannon	Clayton Moore and Linda Stirling	
45	The Black Widow	1947	13	Science fiction Fantasy	Spencer Gordon Bennet and Fred C. Brannon	Carol Forman	
46	G-Men Never Forget	1948	12	Crime	Fred C. Brannon	Clayton Moore and Ramsay Ames	
47	Dangers of the Canadian Mounted	1948, reissued in 1956	12	Northern	Fred C. Brannon	Jim Bannon	
48	Adventures of Frank and Jesse James	1948, reissued in 1956	13	Western	Fred C. Brannon	Clayton Moore	
49	Federal Agents vs. Underworld, Inc.	1949	12	Crime	Fred C. Brannon	Kirk Alyn	
50	Ghost of Zorro	1949	12	Western, Superhero	Fred C. Brannon	Clayton Moore	Based on "Zorro" created by Johnston McCulley
51	King of the Rocket Men	1949, reissued in 1956	12	Science fiction	Fred C. Brannon	Tristram Coffin	First of the "Rocket Man" serials
52	The James Brothers of Missouri	1949	12	Western	Fred C. Brannon	Keith Richards	
53	Radar Patrol vs. Spy King	1949	12	Spy	Fred C. Brannon	Kirk Alyn	
54	The Invisible Monster	1950	12	Science fiction	Fred C. Brannon	Richard Webb	
55	Desperadoes of the West	1950	12	Western	Fred C. Brannon	Tom Keene	
56	Flying Disc Man from Mars	1950	12	Science fiction	Fred C. Brannon	Walter Reed	
57	Don Daredevil Rides Again	1951	12	Western	Fred C. Brannon	Ken Curtis	Loosely based on "Zorro" created by Johnston McCulley
58	Government Agents vs. Phantom Legion	1951	12	Spy	Fred C. Brannon	Walter Reed	
59	Radar Men from the Moon	1952, reissued in 1957	12	Science fiction	Fred C. Brannon	George Wallace, Clayton Moore	
60	Zombies of the Stratosphere	1952	12	Science fiction	Fred C. Brannon	Judd Holdren, Leonard Nimoy	
61	Jungle Drums of Africa	1953	12	Jungle	Fred C. Brannon	Clayton Moore (as "Clay Moore"), Phyllis Coates	
N/A	Commando Cody: Sky Marshal of the Universe	1953	12	Science fiction	Harry Keller, Fred C. Brannon and Franklin Adreon	Judd Holdren, Aline Towne, Richard Crane	A syndicated TV series of self-contained episodes (no cliffhangers) relying mostly on footage recycled from the three earlier (1949–1952) "Rocket Man" theatrical chapterplays. For contractual reasons, it was initially given a brief theatrical release as a feature before going to TV in 12 episodes.
62	Canadian Mounties vs. Atomic Invaders	1953	12	Northern, Spy	Franklin Adreon	Bill Henry	
63	Trader Tom of the China Seas	1954	12	Maritime	Franklin Adreon	Harry Lauter, Aline Towne	
64	Man with the Steel Whip	1954	12	Western	Franklin Adreon	Richard Simmons	Loosely based on "Zorro" created by Johnston McCulley
65	Panther Girl of the Kongo	1955	12	Jungle, Science fiction	Franklin Adreon	Phyllis Coates	
66	King of the Carnival	1955	12	Crime, Spy	Franklin Adreon	Harry Lauter	

=== Universal Pictures ===
Universal produced more serials (137) than any other company.

Number (All)	Number (Sound Only)	Serial title	Year	Chapters	Genre	Director	Cast	Notes
Silent Serials
1		Lucille Love, Girl of Mystery	1914	15		Francis Ford		Produced as Universal Film Manufacturing Co.
2		The Master Key	1914	15		Robert Z. Leonard		Produced as Universal Film Manufacturing Co.
3		The Trey o' Hearts	1914	15		Wilfred Lucas and Henry MacRae		Produced as Universal Film Manufacturing Co.
4		The Black Box	1915	15		Otis Turner		Produced as Universal Film Manufacturing Co.
5		The Broken Coin	1915	22	Mystery	Francis Ford		Produced as Universal Film Manufacturing Co.
6		Graft	1915	20		George Lessey and Richard Stanton		Produced as Universal Film Manufacturing Co.
7		Under the Crescent	1915	6		Burton L. King		Produced as Universal Film Manufacturing Co.
8		The Adventures of Peg o' the Ring	1916	15		Francis Ford and Jacques Jaccard		Produced as Universal Film Manufacturing Co.
9		Liberty, A Daughter of the USA	1916	20	Western	Henry MacRae		Produced as Universal Film Manufacturing Co.
10		The Mystery Ship	1917	18		Henry MacRae		Produced as Universal Film Manufacturing Co.
11		The Red Ace	1917	16		Jacques Jaccard		Produced as Universal Film Manufacturing Co.
12		The Gray Ghost	1917	16		Stuart Paton		Produced as Universal Film Manufacturing Co.
13		Voice on the Wire	1917	15		Stuart Paton		Produced as Universal Film Manufacturing Co.
14		The Brass Bullet	1918	18		Ben F. Wilson		Produced as Universal Film Manufacturing Co.
15		Bull's Eye	1918	18		James W. Horne		Produced as Universal Film Manufacturing Co.
16		The Lion's Claws	1918	18		Harry Harvey and Jacques Jaccard		Produced as Universal Film Manufacturing Co.
17		Lure of the Circus	1918	18		J.P. McGowan		Produced as Universal Film Manufacturing Co.
18		The Red Glove	1918	18		J.P. McGowan		Produced as Universal Film Manufacturing Co.
19		The Great Radium Mystery	1919	18	Mystery	Robert Broadwell and Robert F. Hill		Produced as Universal Film Manufacturing Co.
20		The Lion Man	1919	18	Jungle	Albert Russell and Jack Wells		Produced as Universal Film Manufacturing Co.
21		The Midnight Man	1919	18		James W. Horne		Produced as Universal Film Manufacturing Co.
22		The Flaming Disc	1920			Robert F. Hill		
23		The Moon Riders	1920	18	Western	B. Reeves Eason and Theodore Wharton		
24		King of the Circus	1920	18		J.P. McGowan		
25		The Vanishing Dagger	1920	18		Edward A. Kull, John F. Magowan and Eddie Polo		
26		The Dragon's Net	1920	12		Henry MacRae		
27		The Diamond Queen	1921	18		Edward A. Kull		
28		Do or Die	1921	18		J.P. McGowan		
29		The Secret Four	1921	15		Albert Russell and Perry N. Vekroff		
30		Terror Trail	1921	18	Western	Edward A. Kull		
31		The White Horseman	1921	18	Western	Albert Russell		
32		Winners of the West	1921	13	Western	Edward Laemmle		
33		The Adventures of Robinson Crusoe	1922	18	Maritime	Robert F. Hill		
34		In the Days of Buffalo Bill	1922	18	Maritime	Edward Laemmle		
35		Perils of the Yukon	1922	15	Northern	Jay Marchant, J.P. McGowan and Perry N. Vekroff		
36		The Radio King	1922	10		Robert F. Hill		
37		With Stanley in Africa	1922	18	Jungle	William James Craft and Edward A. Kull		
38		Around the World in Eighteen Days	1923	12		Robert F. Hill and B. Reeves Eason		
39		Beasts of Paradise	1923	15		William James Craft		
40		The Eagle's Talons	1923	15		Duke Worne		
41		The Ghost City	1923	15	Western	Jay Marchant		
42		In the Days of Daniel Boone	1923	15	Western	William James Craft		
43		The Oregon Trail	1923	18	Western	Edward Laemmle		
44		The Phantom Fortune	1923	12		Robert F. Hill		
45		The Social Buccaneer	1923	10	Maritime	Robert F. Hill		
46		The Steel Trail	1923	15		William Duncan		
47		The Fast Express	1924	15		William Duncan		
48		The Fighting Ranger	1924	18	Western	Jay Marchant		
49		The Iron Man	1924	15		Jay Marchant		
50		The Riddle Rider	1924	15	Western	William James Craft		
51		Wolves of the North	1924	10	Western	William Duncan		
52		Ace of Spades	1925	15	Western	Henry MacRae		
53		The Great Circus Mystery	1925	15		Jay Marchant		
54		The Scarlet Streak	1926	10		Henry MacRae		
55		Fighting With Buffalo Bill	1926	10	Western	Ray Taylor		
56		Strings of Steel	1926	10		Henry MacRae		
57		The Winking Idol	1926	10	Western	Francis Ford		
58		Blake of Scotland Yard	1927	12		Robert F. Hill		
59		The Fire Fighters	1927	10		Jacques Jaccard		
60		The Return of the Riddle Rider	1927	10		Robert F. Hill		
61		The Trail of the Tiger	1927	10		Henry MacRae		
62		Whispering Smith Rides	1927	10	Western	Ray Taylor		
63		Haunted Island	1928	10	Fantasy	Robert F. Hill		
64		Tarzan the Mighty	1928	15	Jungle; Fantasy	Ray Taylor and Jack Nelson		
65		The Vanishing Rider	1928	12	Western	Ray Taylor		
66		The Diamond Master	1929	10		Jack Nelson		
67		A Final Reckoning	1929	12	Western	Ray Taylor		
68		The Pirate of Panama	1929	12	Maritime	Ray Taylor		
Partial Sound Serials
69	1	The Ace of Scotland Yard	1929	10	Mystery	Ray Taylor		
70	2	Tarzan the Tiger	1929	15	Jungle; Fantasy	Henry MacRae		
71	3	The Jade Box	1930	10	Mystery; Fantasy	Ray Taylor		
72	4	The Lightning Express	1930	10	Western	Henry MacRae		
73	5	Terry of the Times	1930	10		Henry MacRae		
All Sound Serials
74	6	The Indians are Coming!	1930	12	Western	Henry MacRae	Tim McCoy	
75	7	Finger Prints	1931	10		Ray Taylor		
76	8	Heroes of the Flames	1931	12	Tim McCoy	Robert F. Hill		
77	9	Danger Island	1931	12	Jungle	Ray Taylor		
78	10	Battling with Buffalo Bill	1931	12	Western	Ray Taylor		
79	11	The Spell of the Circus	1931	12		Robert F. Hill		
80	12	Detective Lloyd	1932	12	Crime	Ray Taylor and Henry MacRae	Jack Lloyd	
81	13	The Airmail Mystery	1932	12	Aviation	Ray Taylor	James Flavin	
82	14	Heroes of the West	1932	12	Western	Ray Taylor	Noah Beery Jr.	
83	15	Jungle Mystery	1932	12	Jungle	Ray Taylor		
84	16	The Lost Special	1932	12	Western	Henry MacRae		
85	17	Clancy of the Mounted	1933	12	Northern	Ray Taylor		
86	18	The Phantom of the Air	1933	12	Aviation	Ray Taylor		
87	19	Gordon of Ghost City	1933	12	Western	Ray Taylor	Buck Jones	
88	20	The Perils of Pauline	1933	12	Damsel in distress	Ray Taylor	Evalyn Knapp	
89	21	Pirate Treasure	1934	12	Maritime	Ray Taylor	Richard Talmadge	
90	22	The Vanishing Shadow	1934	12	Science fiction	Louis Friedlander	Onslow Stevens	
91	23	The Red Rider	1934	15	Western	Louis Friedlander	Buck Jones	
92	24	Tailspin Tommy	1934	12	Aviation	Louis Friedlander	Maurice Murphy	
93	25	Rustlers of Red Dog	1935	12	Western	Louis Friedlander	Johnny Mack Brown	
94	26	The Call of the Savage	1935	12	Jungle; Fantasy	Louis Friedlander	Noah Beery Jr.	
95	27	The Roaring West	1935	15	Western	Ray Taylor	Buck Jones	
96	28	Tailspin Tommy in the Great Air Mystery	1935	12	Aviation	Ray Taylor	Clark Williams	
97	29	The Adventures of Frank Merriwell	1936	12	Sports	Ford Beebe and Clifford Smith	Don Briggs	
98	30	Flash Gordon	1936	13	Superhero\Science fiction	Frederick Stephani	Buster Crabbe	Landmark serial, exceptionally popular in theaters and revived for years thereafter
99	31	The Phantom Rider	1936	15	Western	Ray Taylor	Buck Jones	
100	32	Ace Drummond	1936	15	Aviation	Ford Beebe and Clifford Smith	John King	
101	33	Jungle Jim	1937	12	Jungle	Ford Beebe and Clifford Smith	Grant Withers, Evelyn Brent	
102	34	Secret Agent X-9	1937	12	Superhero/Spy	Ford Beebe and Clifford Smith	Scott Kolk	
103	35	Wild West Days	1937	13	Western	Ford Beebe and Clifford Smith	Johnny Mack Brown	
104	36	Radio Patrol	1937	12	Crime	Ford Beebe and Clifford Smith	Grant Withers	
105	37	Tim Tyler's Luck	1937	12	Superhero/Jungle	Ford Beebe and Wyndham Gittens	Frankie Thomas	
106	38	Flash Gordon's Trip to Mars	1938	15	Superhero/Science fiction	Frederick Stephani	Buster Crabbe	
107	39	Flaming Frontiers	1938	15	Western	Alan James and Ray Taylor	Johnny Mack Brown	
108	40	Red Barry	1938	13		Alan James	Buster Crabbe	
109	41	Scouts to the Rescue	1939	12	Juvenile	Alan James and Ray Taylor	Jackie Cooper	
110	42	Buck Rogers	1939	12	Superhero/Science fiction	Ford Beebe and Saul A. Goodkind	Buster Crabbe	
111	43	The Oregon Trail	1939	15	Western	Ford Beebe and Saul A. Goodkind	Johnny Mack Brown	
112	44	The Phantom Creeps	1939	12	Science fiction	Ford Beebe and Saul A. Goodkind	Bela Lugosi	
113	45	The Green Hornet	1940	13	Crime/Superhero	Ray Taylor and Ford Beebe	Gordon Jones	
114	46	Flash Gordon Conquers the Universe	1940	12	Superhero/Science fiction	Ray Taylor and Ford Beebe	Buster Crabbe	
115	47	Winners of the West	1940	13	Western	Ray Taylor and Ford Beebe	Dick Foran, Anne Nagel	
116	48	Junior G-Men	1940	12	Crime	John Rawlins and Ford Beebe	The Dead End Kids	
117	49	The Green Hornet Strikes Again!	1941	15	Crime/Superhero	John Rawlins and Ford Beebe	Warren Hull	
118	50	Sky Raiders	1941	12	Aviation	Ray Taylor and Ford Beebe	Billy Halop, Donald Woods	
119	51	Riders of Death Valley	1941	15	Western	Ray Taylor and Ford Beebe	Dick Foran, Buck Jones	
120	52	Sea Raiders	1941	12	Maritime	Ray Taylor and Ford Beebe	The Dead End Kids	
121	53	Don Winslow of the Navy	1942	12	Maritime	Ray Taylor and Ford Beebe	Don Terry	
122	54	Gang Busters	1942	13	Crime	Ray Taylor and Noel M. Smith	Kent Taylor, Ralph Morgan	
123	55	Junior G-Men of the Air	1942	12	Aviation	Ray Taylor and Lewis D. Collins	The Dead End Kids	
124	56	Overland Mail	1942	15	Western	John Rawlins and Ford Beebe	Lon Chaney Jr.	
125	57	The Adventures of Smilin' Jack	1943	13	Aviation	Ray Taylor and Lewis D. Collins	Tom Brown, Keye Luke	
126	58	Don Winslow of the Coast Guard	1943	13	Maritime	Ray Taylor and Lewis D. Collins	Don Terry	
127	59	Adventures of the Flying Cadets	1943	13	Aviation	Ray Taylor and Lewis D. Collins	Johnny Downs, Billy Benedict	Intended for the Dead End Kids.
128	60	The Great Alaskan Mystery	1944	13		Ray Taylor and Lewis D. Collins	Milburn Stone	
129	61	Raiders of Ghost City	1944	13	Western	Ray Taylor and Lewis D. Collins	Dennis Moore	
130	62	Mystery of the River Boat	1944	13		Ray Taylor and Lewis D. Collins	Robert Lowery, Eddie Quillan	
131	63	Jungle Queen	1945	13	Jungle	Ray Taylor and Lewis D. Collins	Edward Norris, Eddie Quillan	
132	64	The Master Key	1945	13		Ray Taylor and Lewis D. Collins	Milburn Stone, Dennis Moore	
133	65	Secret Agent X-9	1945	13	Spy	Ray Taylor and Lewis D. Collins	Lloyd Bridges	
134	66	The Royal Mounted Rides Again	1945	13	Northern	Ray Taylor and Lewis D. Collins	Bill Kennedy, Milburn Stone	
135	67	The Scarlet Horseman	1946	13	Western	Ray Taylor and Lewis D. Collins	Paul Guilfoyle	
136	68	Lost City of the Jungle	1946	13	Jungle	Ray Taylor and Lewis D. Collins	Lionel Atwill, Keye Luke	
137	69	The Mysterious Mr. M	1946	13	Science fiction	Lewis D. Collins and Vernon Keays	Dennis Moore	

== Minor studios ==
These studios produced only small numbers of serials. They were either small, independent studios themselves or major studios not interested in the serial market.

Serial title	Year	Chapters	Genre	Director	Cast	Notes
Adventure Pictures
Perils of the Wild	1925	15	Maritime	Francis Ford		
Allgood Pictures Corporation
The Whirlwind	1920	15		Joseph A. Golden		
American Film Company
The Diamond from the Sky	1915	30		Jacques Jaccard and William Desmond Taylor		
The Sequel to the Diamond From the Sky	1916	4		Edward Sloman		
The Secret of the Submarine	1916	15		George L. Sargent		
The Scarlet Runner	1916	12		William P.S. Earle and Wally Van		
Arrow Film Corporation
The Fatal Sign	1920	14		Stuart Paton		
The Blue Fox	1921	15		Duke Worne		
Nan of the North	1921	15	Northern	Duke Worne		
The Fighting Skipper	1923	15	Maritime	Francis Ford		
The Santa Fe Trail	1923	15	Western	Ashton Dearholt and Robert Dillon		
Riders of the Plains	1924	15	Western	Jacques Jaccard		
Astra Film Corporation with Pathé Exchange
Pearl of the Army	1916	15	Damsel in distress	Edward José	Pearl White	Also listed under Pathé Exchange
The Shielding Shadow	1916	15		Louis J. Gasnier and Donald MacKenzie		Also listed under Pathé Exchange
The Fatal Ring	1917	20		George B. Seitz	Pearl White	Also listed under Pathé Exchange
The Hidden Hand	1917	15				Also listed under Pathé Exchange
The Mystery of the Double Cross	1917	15		Louis J. Gasnier and William Parke	Mollie King	Also listed under Pathé Exchange
The Seven Pearls	1917	15		Louis J. Gasnier and Donald MacKenzie		Also listed under Pathé Exchange
Hands Up!	1918	15	Jungle	Louis J. Gasnier and James W. Horne	Ruth Roland	Also listed under Pathé Exchange
The House of Hate	1918	20	Mystery	George B. Seitz	Pearl White	Also listed under Pathé Exchange
The Adventures of Ruth	1919	15		George Marshall	Ruth Roland	Also listed under Pathé Exchange
Bound and Gagged	1919	10		George B. Seitz		Also listed under Pathé Exchange
The Lightning Raider	1919	15		George B. Seitz	Pearl White	Also listed under Pathé Exchange
Terror of the Range	1919	7	Western	Stuart Paton		Also listed under Pathé Exchange
The Tiger's Trail	1919			Robert Ellis, Louis J. Gasnier, and Paul Hurst	Ruth Roland	Also listed under Pathé Exchange
Daredevil Jack	1920	15		W.S. Van Dyke		Also listed under Pathé Exchange
The Phantom Foe	1920	15		Bertram Millhauser		Also listed under Pathé Exchange
Pirate Gold	1920	10	Maritime	George B. Seitz		Also listed under Pathé Exchange
The Third Eye	1920	15		James W. Horne		Also listed under Pathé Exchange
Trailed By Three	1920	15	Western	Perry N. Vekroff		Also listed under Pathé Exchange
Balboa Amusement Producing Company
Neal of the Navy	1915	14	Maritime	William Bertram and W.M. Harvey		
The Red Circle	1915	14		Sherwood MacDonald	Ruth Roland	
The Neglected Wife	1917	15		William Bertram	Ruth Roland	
Ben Wilson Productions
The Voice from the Sky	1930	10	Science fiction	Ben F. Wilson		Sound Serial
Berwilla Film Corporation
Thunderbolt Jack	1920	10	Western	Francis Ford and Murdock MacQuarrie		
Burroughs-Tarzan Enterprises
The New Adventures of Tarzan	1935	12	Jungle; Fantasy	Edward A. Kull	Herman Brix	Sound Serial
Burston Films Inc.
The Silent Mystery	1918	15		Francis Ford		
The Mystery of 13	1919	15		Francis Ford		
The Hawk's Trail	1920	15		W.S. Van Dyke		
The Great Reward	1921	15		Francis Ford		
Canyon Pictures Corporation
Vanishing Trails	1920	15	Western	Leon De La Mothe		
Decla Bioscop AG
Die Spinnen	1919	2	Fantasy; Adventure	Fritz Lang		
Deutsche Bioscop
Homunculus	1916	6	Science fiction	Otto Rippert		
Deutsche Vitaskop GmbH
Arsene Lupin Contra Sherlock Holmes	1910	5	Mystery		Paul Otto (Lupin) and Viggo Larsen (Holmes)	
Edison Studios
What Happened to Mary?	1912	12		Charles Brabin	Mary Fuller	
Dolly of the Dailies	1914	12		Walter Edwin	Mary Fuller	
The Man Who Disappeared	1914	10		Charles Brabin		
Who Will Marry Mary?	1913	6			Mary Fuller	
Erbograph/Consolidated Film Corporation
The Crimson Stain Mystery	1916	16	Horror	T. Hayes Hunter		
Essanay Film Manufacturing Company
The Strange Case of Mary Page	1916	15		J. Charles Haydon		
Films Diamant
Les Trois Mousquetaires	1921			Henri Diamant-Berger		
Fox Film Corporation
Fantômas	1920	20	Mystery; Crime	Edward Sedgwick		
Bride 13	1920	15		Richard Stanton		
Frohman Amusement Corporation
The Invisible Ray	1920	15	Science fiction	Harry A. Pollard		
Société des Etablissements L. Gaumont
Fantômas	1913		Mystery; Crime	Louis Feuillade		
Les Vampires	1915	10	Mystery	Louis Feuillade		
L'X Noir	1915					
Judex	1916	12	Crime	Louis Feuillade		
Tih Minh	1918			Louis Feuillade		
Barrabas	1919			Louis Feuillade		
Parisette	1921			Louis Feuillade		
George B. Seitz Productions
The Black Secret	1919	15		George B. Seitz	Pearl White	
Velvet Fingers	1920	15		George B. Seitz		
Hurricane Hutch	1921	15	Charles Hutchison	George B. Seitz		
The Sky Ranger	1921	15		George B. Seitz		
Go Get 'Em Hutch	1922	15	Charles Hutchison	George B. Seitz		
Speed	1923	15		George B. Seitz		
Plunder	1923	15		George B. Seitz	Pearl White	
Goodart
Pirates of the Pines	1928	10	Maritime	J.C. Cook		
Goodwill Pictures
Officer 444	1926	10		Francis Ford and Ben F. Wilson	Ben Wilson	
The Radio Detective	1926	10		William James Craft and William A. Crinley		
Great Britain Instructional
The Mystery of the Snakeskin Belt	1950			Frank Cadman		
Great Western Film Producing Corporation
Elmo the Mighty	1919	18	Western	Henry MacRae	Elmo Lincoln	
Elmo the Fearless	1920	18	Western	J.P. McGowan	Elmo Lincoln	
Grossman Pictures
The $1,000,000 Reward	1920	15		Harry Grossman and George Lessey		
Hal Roach Studios Inc.
The Timber Queen	1922	15		Fred Jackman	Ruth Roland	With, and also listed under, Ruth Roland Serials
White Eagle	1922	15		Fred Jackman and W.S. Van Dyke	Ruth Roland	With, and also listed under, Ruth Roland Serials
Her Dangerous Path	1923	10		Roy Clements		
Hallmark Pictures Corporation
The Trail of the Octopus	1919	15	Mystery, Yellow peril	Duke Worne		
The Evil Eye	1920	15		J. Gordon Cooper and Wally Van		
The Screaming Shadow	1920	15		Ben F. Wilson and Duke Worne		
Hercules Film Productions
King of the Jungle	1927	10	Jungle	Webster Cullison		
Holmes Producing Corporation
The Tiger Band	1920	15		Gilbert P. Hamilton		
Lightning Hutch	1926	10		Charles Hutchison	Charles Hutchison	
The Mystery Pilot	1926	10				
International Film Service Inc.
Patria	1917	15		Jacques Jaccard, Leopold Wharton and Theodore Wharton		
J. Charles Davis Productions
The Mystery Box	1925	10		Alvin J, Neitz		
The Power God	1925	15	Science fiction	Francis Ford and Ben F. Wilson	Ben Wilson	
Jaxon Film Corporation
A Daughter of Uncle Sam	1918	12		James C. Morton		
Kalem Company
The Hazards of Helen	1914	119	Damsel in distress	J.P. McGowan and James D. Davis	Helen Holmes and Helen Gibson	
The Ventures of Marguerite	1915	16	Damsel in distress	Robert Ellis, John Mackin and Hamilton Smith		
Kleine Productions Inc.
Gloria's Romance	1916	20	Damsel in distress	Colin Campbell and Walter Edwin		
Kosmik
The Hope Diamond Mystery	1921	15		Stuart Paton		
Lubin Studios
The Beloved Adventurer	1914	15		Arthur V. Johnson		
The Road o' Strife	1915	15		Howell Hansel and John Ince		
Metro Pictures Corporation
The Great Secret	1916	18		Christy Cabanne		
Metropolitan Pictures
The Sign of the Wolf	1931	10	Western	Forrest Sheldon and Harry S. Webb		Sound Serial
Monmouth Film Corporation
Jimmie Dale, Alias the Grey Seal	1917	16	Mystery	Harry McRae Webster		
National Film Corporation of America
Lightning Bryce	1919	15	Western, Horror	Paul Hurst		
The Son of Tarzan	1920	15	Jungle; Fantasy	Arthur J. Flaven and Harry Revier		
New-Cal Film Corporation
The Scarlet Brand	1927	10		Neal Hart		
Niagara Film Studios
Perils of Our Girl Reporters	1916	15	Damsel in distress	George Terwilliger		
Oliver Films Inc.
The Carter Case	1919	15		William F. Haddock and Donald MacKenzie		
Paramount Pictures
Who Is Number One?	1917	15	Mystery	William Bertram		
Photoplay Serial Company
Mysterious Pearl	1921	15		Ben F. Wilson		
Power Picture Plays
The Mysterious Lady Baffles and Detective Duck	1915		Comedy	Allen Curtis		
Principal Pictures
Tarzan the Fearless	1933	12	Jungle; Fantasy	Robert F. Hill	Buster Crabbe	Sound Serial
The Return of Chandu	1933	12	Fantasy	Ray Taylor	Bela Lugosi	Sound Serial
Rayart Pictures Corporation
Battling Brewster	1924	15		Dell Henderson		
The Flame Fighter	1925	10		Robert Dillon		
Secret Service Sanders	1925	15		Duke Worne		
The Phantom Police	1926	10		Robert Dillon		
Scotty of the Scouts	1926	10		Duke Worne		
Trooper 77	1926	10		Duke Worne		
Fighting For Fame	1927	10		Duke Worne		
Reliance Film Company
Our Mutual Girl	1914	52		John W. Noble	Norma Phillips	
Runaway June	1915	15		Oscar Eagle		
Van Beuren Productions
The Last Frontier	1932	12	Western	Spencer Gordon Bennet	Creighton Chaney	Sound Serial
Robert J. Horner
The Mystery Rider	1928	10	Western	Robert J. Horner		
The Scarlet Arrow	1928	10				
Rolfe Photoplays
The Master Mystery	1918	15	Mystery, Science fiction	Harry Grossman and Burton L. King	Harry Houdini	Rolfe Photoplays' last production
Romance Productions Incorporated
Young Eagles	1934	12		Spencer Gordon Bennet		Sound Serial
Ruth Roland Serials
Ruth of the Rockies	1920	15	Western	George Marshall	Ruth Roland	With, and also listed under, Pathé Exchange
The Timber Queen	1922	15		Fred Jackman	Ruth Roland	With, and also listed under, Hal Roach Studios
White Eagle	1922	15		Fred Jackman and W.S. Van Dyke	Ruth Roland	With, and also listed under, Hal Roach Studios
Haunted Valley	1923	15	Mystery	George Marshall	Ruth Roland	
Ruth of the Range	1923	15		Ernest C. Ward, Frank Leon Smith and W.S. Van Dyke	Ruth Roland	
Screen Attractions
Queen of the Jungle	1935	12	Jungle	Robert F. Hill	Mary Kornman	Sound serial, with almost all of the action footage taken from the 1922 silent serial The Jungle Goddess
Select Pictures Corporation
The Branded Four	1920	15		Duke Worne		
Selig Polyscope Company
The Adventures of Kathlyn	1913	13		Francis J. Grandon	Kathlyn Williams	
Serial Film Corporation
The Yellow Menace	1916	16		William Steiner		
Serico Producing Co. Inc.
A Woman in Grey	1919	15	Mystery	James Vincent	Arline Pretty, Henry G. Sell	Filmed in Wilkes-Barre, Pennsylvania
Shamrock Photoplay Corporation
The Masked Rider	1919	15	Western	Aubrey M. Kennedy		
Sierra Pictures
Vanishing Millions	1926	15		Alan James		
Signal Film Corporation
Lass of the Lumberlands	1916	15	Western	J.P. McGowan		
The Girl and the Game	1915	15	Damsel in distress	J.P. McGowan		
The Lost Express	1917	15		J.P. McGowan		
The Railroad Raiders	1917	15		J.P. McGowan		
SLK Serial Corporation
The Fatal Fortune	1919	15	Jungle	Donald MacKenzie and Frank Wunderlee		
Société des Cinéromans
Surcouf	1925	8	Maritime	Luitz-Morat	Jean Angelo	
Belphégor	1927			Henri Desfontaines		
Star Serial Corporation
Captain Kidd	1922	15	Maritime	Burton L. King and J.P. McGowan		
Super Serial Productions Inc.
The Lost City	1935	12	Fantasy; Jungle	Harry Revier	William "Stage" Boyd	Sound Serial
Supreme Pictures Corporation
The Mystery Mind	1920	15		Will S. Davis and Fred Sittenham		
Syndicate Pictures
The Chinatown Mystery	1928	10		J.P. McGowan		
The Mystery Trooper	1931	10	Western	Stuart Paton and Harry S. Webb	Robert Walker	Sound serial, reissued in 1947 as Trail of the Royal Mounted
Talking Picture Epics Inc.
Across the World with Mr. & Mrs. Martin Johnson	1930		Documentary	James Leo Meehan		Sound Serial
Hunting Tigers in India	1930		Documentary	James Leo Meehan		Sound Serial
Thanhouser Company
The Million Dollar Mystery	1914	23		Howell Hansel		
Zudora	1914	20		Howell Hansel		
The American Lifeograph Company
A Nugget in the Rough	1917		Drama	Ruth Wieland and Harold Grady	Louis H. Moomaw	6 reels, for Starlight Film Company. First full-length motion picture made in Portland, OR.
Perils of Thunder Mountain	1919	15		Robert N. Bradbury and W.J. Burman		
Wharton, Inc.
The Perils of Pauline	1914	20	Damsel in distress	Louis J. Gasnier and Donald MacKenzie	Pearl White	With, and also listed under, Pathé Exchange
The Exploits of Elaine	1914	14	Damsel in distress	George B. Seitz		With, and also listed under, Pathé Exchange
The New Exploits of Elaine	1915	10	Damsel in distress	Louis J. Gasnier, Leopold Wharton and Theodore Wharton	Pearl White	With, and also listed under, Pathé Exchange
The Romance of Elaine	1915	12	Damsel in distress	George B. Seitz	Pearl White	With, and also listed under, Pathé Exchange
The Mysteries of Myra	1916	15		Leopold Wharton and Theodore Wharton		
The Grip of Evil	1916	14		W.A.S. Douglas and Harry Harvey		
The Iron Claw	1916	20		George B. Seitz	Pearl White	
Beatrice Fairfax	1916	15		Leopold Wharton and Theodore Wharton		
The Eagle's Eye	1918	20		George Lessey, Wellington A. Playter, Leopold Wharton and Theodore Wharton		
Torquay & Paignton Photoplay Productions
The Great London Mystery	1920		Mystery	Charles Raymond		
UFA
Peter Voss, Thief of Millions	1921	6		Georg Jacoby	Harry Liedtke	
Victory Pictures
Shadow of Chinatown	1936	15	Mystery, Yellow peril	Robert F. Hill	Bela Lugosi	Sound Serial
Blake of Scotland Yard	1937	15	Crime	Robert F. Hill	Ralph Byrd	Sound Serial
Vitagraph Studios
Fates and Flora Fourflush	1915	3		Wally Van		
The Goddess	1915	15		Ralph Ince		
The Purple Mask	1916	16		Francis Ford and Grace Cunard		
The Fighting Trail	1917	15	Western	William Duncan		
The Secret Kingdom	1917	15	Fantasy	Charles Brabin		
Vengeance and the Woman	1917	15		William Duncan and Laurence Trimble		
A Fight for Millions	1918	15		William Duncan		
The Iron Test	1918	15		Robert N. Bradbury and Paul Hurst		
A Woman in the Web	1918	15		Paul Hurst and David Smith		
Man of Might	1919	15		William Duncan and Clifford Smith		
Smashing Barriers	1919	15		William Duncan		
Hidden Dangers	1920	15		William Bertram		
The Invisible Hand	1920	15	Western	William Bowman		
The Silent Avenger	1920	15		William Duncan		
The Veiled Mystery	1920	15	Western	William Bowman, Webster Cullison, Francis J. Grandon and Antonio Moreno		
Breaking Through	1921	15		Robert Ensminger		
Fighting Fate	1921	15		William Duncan		
The Purple Riders	1921	15	Western	William Bertram		
Warner Bros.
The Lost City	1920	15	Jungle	E.A. Martin		
Miracles of the Jungle	1921	15	Jungle	James Conway and E.A. Martin		
A Dangerous Adventure	1922	15	Jungle	Jack L. Warner and Sam Warner		
Weiss Brothers Artclass Pictures Corporation
The Adventures of Tarzan	1921	15	Jungle; Fantasy	Robert F. Hill and Scott Sidney		
Perils of the Jungle	1927	10	Jungle	Ray Taylor and Jack Nelson		
The Mysterious Airman	1928	10	Aviation	Harry Revier	Walter Miller	
Police Reporter	1929	10		Jack Nelson		
Weiss Productions
Custer's Last Stand	1936	15	Western	Elmer Clifton	Rex Lease	Sound Serial
The Clutching Hand	1936	15		Albert Herman	Jack Mulhall	Sound Serial
The Black Coin	1936	15	Ralph Graves	Albert Herman		Sound Serial
Western Photoplays Inc.
The Wolves of Kultur	1918	15		Joseph A. Golden		
The Great Gamble	1919	15		Joseph A. Golden		
Wild West Productions
Days of '49	1925	15	Western			
William I. Pizor Productions
The Mansion of Mystery	1927	10	Mystery	Robert J. Horner		
William N. Selig Productions
The Jungle Goddess	1922	15	Jungle	James Conway		
Wisteria Productions
The Lurking Peril	1919	15		George Morgan		

== See also ==
- Movie serial
- List of film serials
