= Lists of silent films =

This is a list of silent films.

== Lost silent films ==
- List of lost films
- List of lost silent films (1910–1914)
- List of lost silent films (1915–1919)
- List of lost silent films (1920–1924)
- List of lost silent films (1925–1929)
- List of incomplete or partially lost films
- List of lost or unfinished animated films
- List of rediscovered films
- List of rediscovered film footage

== By region ==
- List of silent Bengali films
- List of silent films from South India

== Others ==
- List of silent films released on 8 mm or Super 8 mm film

== See also ==
- Lists of films
