= The Black Book (serial) =

1929 film

- Directed by: Spencer Gordon Bennet; Thomas Storey
- Written by: Joseph Anthony Roach
- Starring: Allene Ray; Walter Miller
- Cinematography: Edward Snyder
- Distributed by: Pathé Exchange
- Release date: July 21, 1929
- Running time: 10 episodes
- Country: United States
- Language: Silent with English intertitles

The Black Book is a 1929 American silent crime film serial directed by Spencer Gordon Bennet and Thomas Storey, starring Allene Ray, Walter Miller and Frank Lackteen. A partial print exists in the Library of Congress, but it is missing Chapters 2 and 4.

Dora Drake is seeking a supposedly valuable Black Book that belongs to her uncle Tony LeBec. The book holds the key to a fortune in platinum owned by her uncle, and a group of criminals are trying to get possession of it. She is aided by her boyfriend Ted and his Chinese cab driver companion named Tin Lung. Frank Lackteen plays the villainous Valdez.

== Cast ==
- Allene Ray as Dora Drake
- Walter Miller as Ted Bradley
- Frank Lackteen as Valdez
- Paul Panzer as The Hawk
- Marie Mosquini as Sally
- Edith London as Mrs. Valdez
- Willie Fung as Tin Lung, a cab driver
- Edward Cecil as Limpy Lambert
- John Webb Dillion as Uncle Tony LeBec
- Fred Malatesta as Sudro
- Floyd Adams as Michael
- Olga Vanna as The Maid
- Jock Fraser as Crook
- Evan Pearson as Crook
- Clay De Roy as Crook

== Chapter Titles ==
[1] “The Secret of the Vault,” [2] “The Death Rail,” [3] “A Shot in the Night,” [4] “The Danger Sign,” [5] “The Flaming Trap,” [6] “The Black Van,” [7] “The Fatal Hour,” [8] “The Mystery Mill,” [9] “The Assassin Strikes,” [10] “Out of the Shadows,”

== See also ==
- List of film serials
- List of film serials by studio
