= The Fortieth Door =

1924 film

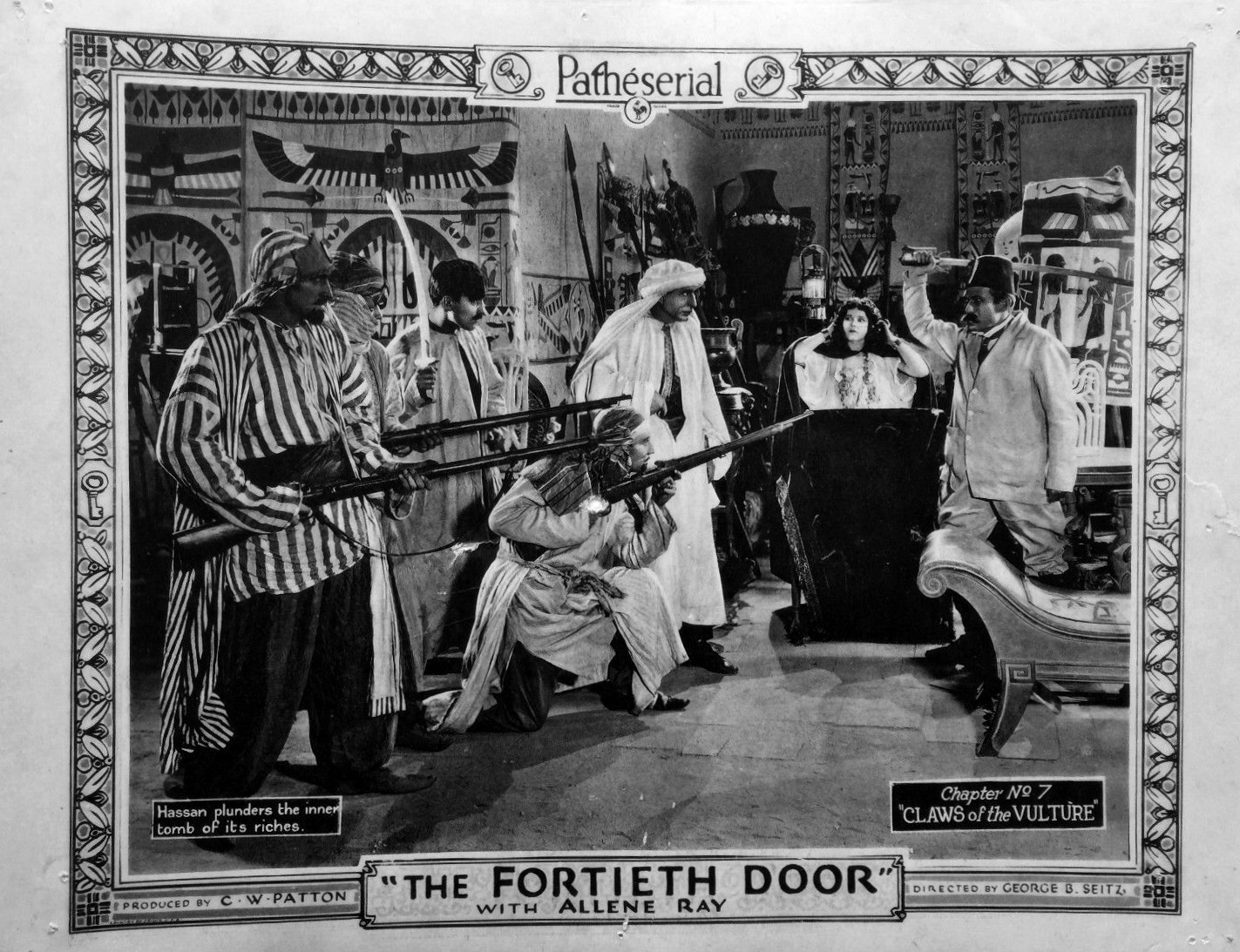
- Lobby card
- Directed by: George B. Seitz
- Written by: Frank Leon Smith
- Based on: The Fortieth Door by Mary Hastings Bradley
- Produced by: C. W. Patton
- Starring: Allene Ray; Bruce Gordon
- Cinematography: Vernon L. Walker
- Distributed by: Pathé Exchange
- Release date: May 25, 1924
- Running time: 10 episodes
- Country: United States
- Language: Silent (English intertitles)

The Fortieth Door is a 1924 American adventure film serial directed by George B. Seitz and starring Allene Ray and Bruce Gordon. The film is considered to be lost. The Library of Congress includes the film among the National Film Preservation Board's updated 2019 list of "7,200 Lost U.S. Silent Feature Films" produced between 1912 and 1929.

== Plot ==
As described in a film magazine review, this desert story concerns Jack Ryder, an American archeologist in Egypt, and Aimee, who is believed to be a Mohammedan. Jack falls in love with Aimee at a dance in a Cairo hotel. Her father agrees to betroth her to a swindling nobleman to keep from being arrested for trading in narcotics. In the ruins of the Egyptian tombs, Jack finds proof that Aimee is a young French woman whose parents had been captured by bandits and had then fallen into the hands of an Egyptian nobleman. All ends well, however, and everyone lives happily thereafter.

== Cast ==
- Allene Ray as Aimee
- Bruce Gordon as Jack Ryder
- David Dunbar as Andy McLean
- Anna May Wong as Zira
- Frankie Mann as Jimmy Jeffries (credited as Frances Mann)
- Frank Lackteen as Hamid Bey
- Lillian Gale as Miriam
- Bernard Siegel as Tew Fick Pasha
- Whitehorse as Sheik Hassan
- Omar Whitehead as Paul Delcarte
- Scott McKee as Commissioner of Police (credited as Scott McGee)
- Eli Stanton as Ali

== Reception ==
While the serial consisted mainly of adventures and escapes in the Egyptian desert, its plot also involved archaeological excavations. A contemporary archaeological journal, noting how producers had recently promoted historical accuracy as a feature of their films, stated that The Fortieth Door attempted to bring an overall ancient Egyptian look to scenes with the exterior of a tomb, but the interior lacked any authenticity in its furnishings or jewelry. The article recommended that films employ an Egyptologist for accuracy.

== Chapter titles ==
1. The Secret Portal
2. Two Lockets
3. The Wedding
4. Buried Alive
5. Desert Trails
6. Tomb of the King
7. Claws of the Vulture
8. Held for Hostage
9. The Rack
10. The Temple of the Forty Doors

== See also ==
- List of film serials
- List of film serials by studio
- List of lost films
