= Melting Millions (1927 serial) =

1927 film

- Directed by: Spencer Gordon Bennet
- Written by: Joseph Anthony Roach
- Starring: Allene Ray; Walter Miller
- Distributed by: Pathé Exchange
- Release date: April 10, 1927
- Running time: 10 episodes
- Country: United States
- Language: Silent with English intertitles

Melting Millions is a 1927 American adventure film serial directed by Spencer Gordon Bennet. It is considered to be lost.

== Cast ==
- Allene Ray as Judy Winslow
- Walter Miller as Lieutenant Palmer
- E. H. Calvert
- William Norton Bailey
- Eugenia Gilbert
- Frank Lackteen
- John J. Richardson
- George Kuwa
- Albert Roccardi
- Bob Burns (as Robert Burns)
- John Cossar
- Ernie Adams
- Richard Travers (as Richard C. Travers)

== See also ==
- List of film serials
- List of film serials by studio
