= The Phantom (1931 film) =

1931 film

- Film poster
- Directed by: Alan James
- Story by: Alan James
- Starring: Big Boy Williams, Sheldon Lewis
- Cinematography: Lauren Draper
- Edited by: Ethel Davey
- Release date: December 1, 1931
- Running time: 70 minutes
- Country: United States
- Language: English

The Phantom is a 1931 American pre-Code mystery film directed by Alan James.

== Plot ==
A reporter goes in search of a deranged masked killer hiding in an insane asylum.

== Cast ==
Cast list adapted from Poverty Row Studios, 1929-1940.

- Guinn Williams as Dick Mallory
- Allene Ray as Ruth Hampton
- Niles Welch as Sam Crandall
- Tom O'Brien as Pat Collins
- Sheldon Lewis as The Phantom
- Wilfred Lucas as John Hampton
- Violet Knight as Lucy
- William Gould as Dr. Weldon
- Bobby Dunn as Shorty
- William Jackie as Oscar
- Horace Murphy as Police Chief Murphy

== Release ==
The Phantom was released on December 1, 1931.

== Reception ==
In his book on Poverty Row studio films of the 1930s, Michael R. Pitts commented that The Phantom is "a plodding affair with typical character types" noting that the casting of Guinn "Big Boy" Williams as the ace reporter and Allene Ray as the innocent heroine was "unlikely to say the least". Pitts concluded that the film was "far from a classic, The Phantom is worth seeing if only to witness the performances of its two unlikely leads."
