= The Valley of Vanishing Men =

- Theatrical release poster
- Directed by: Spencer Gordon Bennet
- Written by: Harry Fraser; Lewis Clay; George Gray; Original screenplay
- Produced by: Larry Darmour
- Starring: Bill Elliott; Slim Summerville; Carmen Morales
- Narrated by: Knox Manning
- Cinematography: James S. Brown Jr. Black and white
- Edited by: Dwight Caldwell; Earl Turner
- Music by: Lee Zahler
- Distributed by: Columbia Pictures
- Release date: December 12, 1942
- Running time: 15 episodes 280 minutes
- Country: United States
- Language: English

The Valley of Vanishing Men is a 1942 American Western film serial. It was the 20th of 57 released by Columbia Pictures. Directed by Spencer Gordon Bennet, it stars Bill Elliott, Slim Summerville, and Carmen Morales.

== Plot ==
In this serial, Wild Bill Tolliver and Missouri Benson are a pair of adventurers who ride into the vast New Mexico Territory in search of Bill's father, Henry Tolliver, who mysteriously disappeared while prospecting for gold. They soon discover that a ruthless outlaw leader, Jonathan Kincaid, owns an immense mine of gold in which he uses captured Mexican patriots, among others, to work as slaves in the mine. They also learn that Kincaid has joined forces with Colonel Carl Engler, a renegade eastern European soldier, to carry out his cruel intentions. Then Bill and Missouri meet with Consuelo Ramírez, a diligent Mexican agent, who informs them that Bill's father is among the prisoners in the mine. After that, the heroes find themselves in a conflict with the outlaws in the middle of incessant fights, chases and action.

== Cast ==
- Bill Elliott as Wild Bill Tolliver
- Slim Summerville as Missouri Benson
- Carmen Morales as Consuelo Ramírez
- Kenneth MacDonald
- Jack Ingram
- George Chesebro
- John Shay
- Tom London
- Arno Frey
- Julian Rivero

== Production ==
Writing about the film's atmosphere, Cline says that this serial was a "grim tale...[with a] mood of ominous dread." MissouriBenson was added to the cast because a normal comic relief character would have not have worked.

== Chapter titles ==
1. Trouble in Canyon City
2. The Mystery of Ghost Town
3. Danger Walks by night
4. Hillside Horror
5. Guns in the Night
6. The Bottomless Well
7. The Man in the Gold Mask
8. When the Devil Drives
9. The Traitor's Shroud
10. Death Strikes at Seven
11. Satan in the Saddle
12. The Mine of Missing Men
13. Danger on Dome Rock
14. The Door that Has No Key
15. Empire's End

_{Source:}

== See also ==
- List of film serials by year
- List of film serials by studio

Preceded by The Secret Code (1942)	Columbia Serial; The Valley of Vanishing Men (1942)	Succeeded by Batman (1943)
