= Ten Scars Make a Man =

1924 film

- Directed by: William Parke
- Written by: Phillip Barry
- Produced by: C. W. Patton
- Starring: Allene Ray; Jack Mower
- Distributed by: Pathé Exchange
- Release date: October 12, 1924
- Running time: 10 episodes
- Country: United States
- Language: Silent with English intertitles

Ten Scars Make a Man is a 1924 American adventure film serial written by Phillip Barry and directed by William Parke. The film is considered to be lost.

== Cast ==
- Allene Ray as Jean Morell
- Jack Mower as Jack O'Day
- Rose Burdick as Rita Morell
- Frank Whitson as Henry O'Day
- Larry Steers as Edgar Venable
- Leon De La Mothe as Luther Candle (as Leon Kent)
- Harry Woods as Buck Simpson
- Frank Lanning as Aztinca

== See also ==
- List of film serials
- List of film serials by studio
- List of lost films
