= Snowed In (serial) =

1926 film

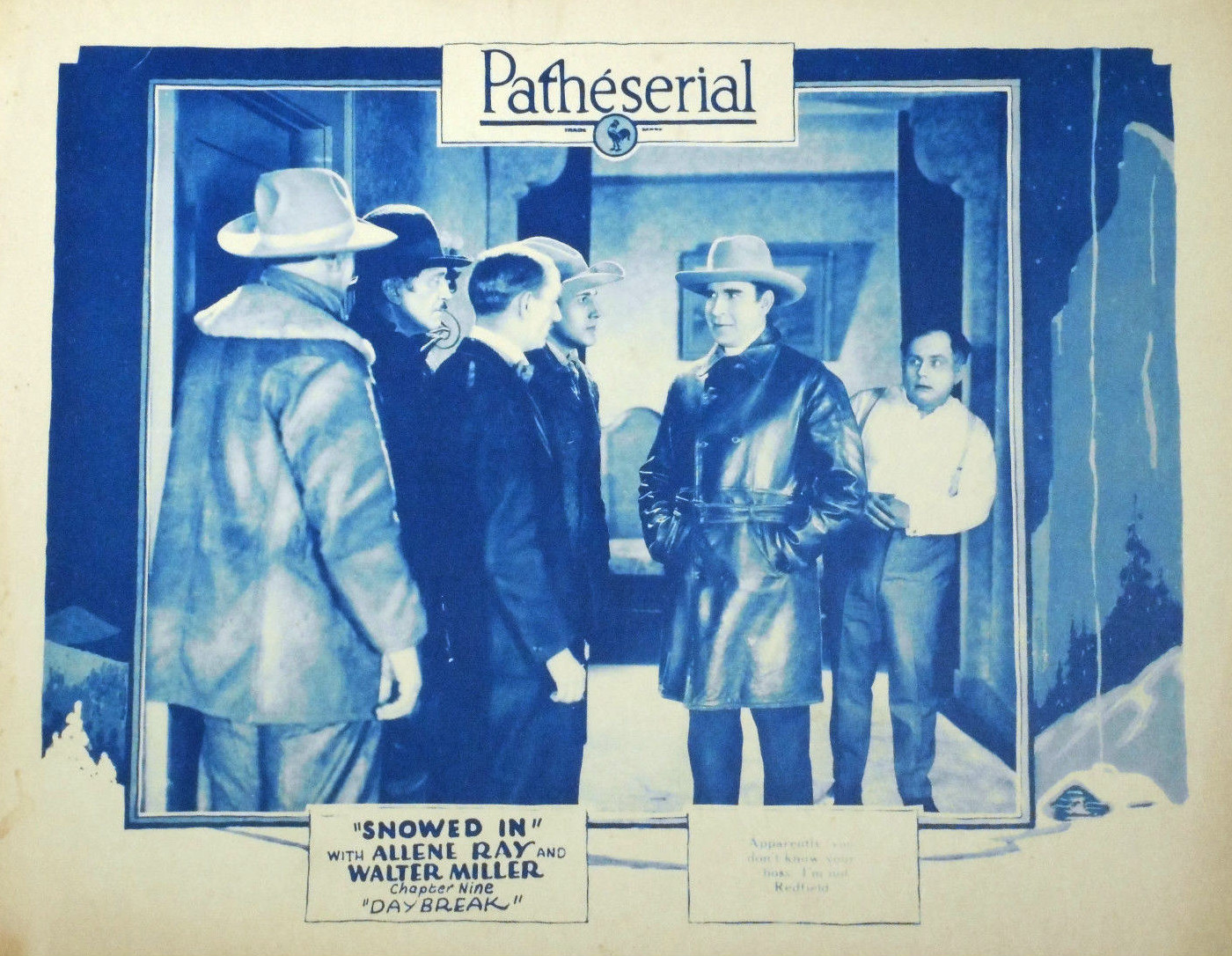
- Lobby card for Chapter 9
- Directed by: Spencer Gordon Bennet (credited as Spencer G. Bennet)
- Written by: Frank Leon Smith (story, scenario)
- Starring: Allene Ray; Walter Miller
- Cinematography: Linwood G. Dunn
- Production company: Pathé Exchange
- Distributed by: Pathé Exchange Inc.
- Release date: July 4, 1926
- Running time: 10 episodes
- Country: United States
- Language: Silent (English intertitles)

Snowed In is a 1926 American silent drama film serial in 10 episodes/chapters. Directed by Spencer Gordon Bennet, the film stars Allene Ray and Walter Miller. Aviation film historian James H. Farmer considered Snowed In as an "above average serial of the period."

== Plot ==
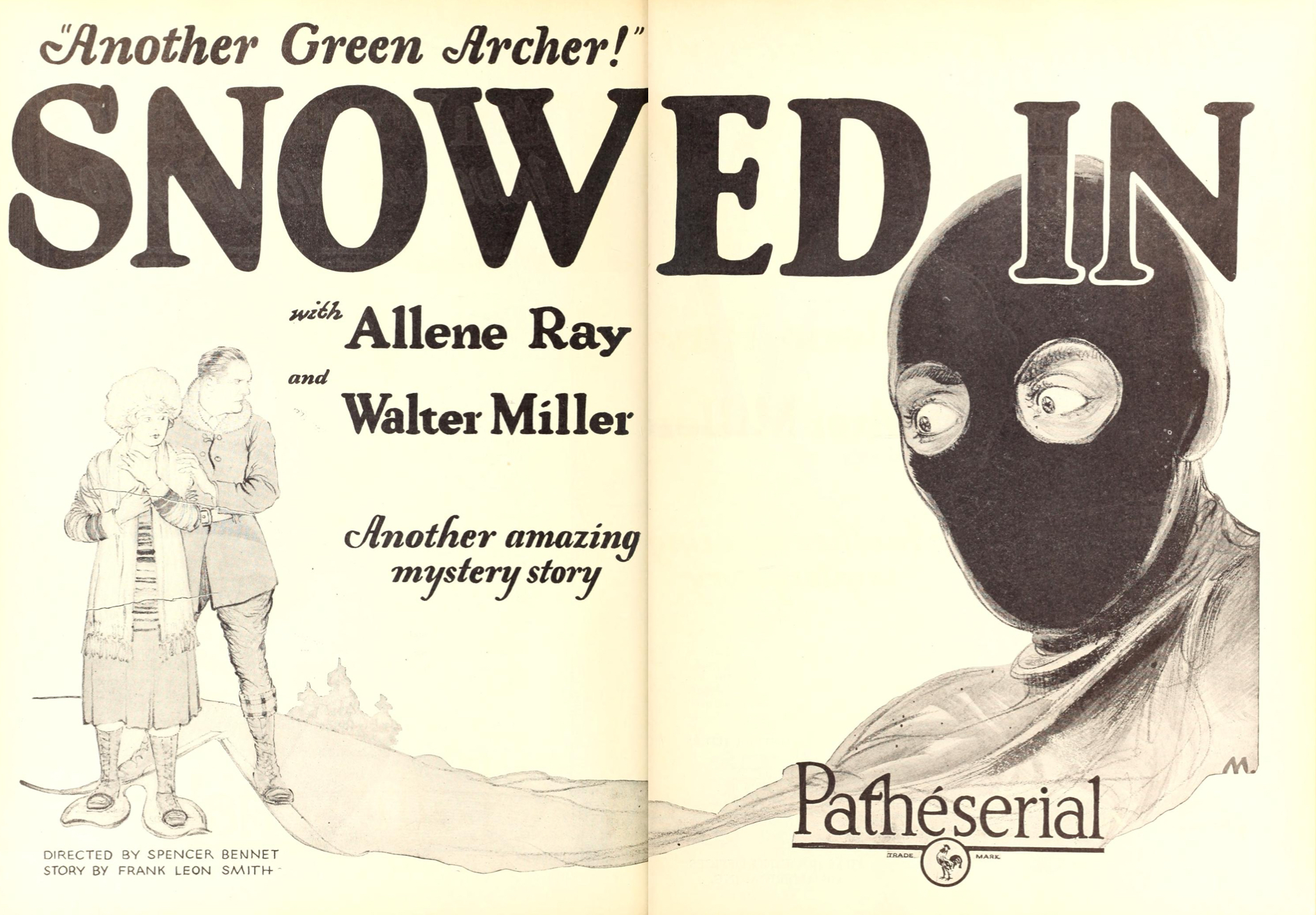
Snowed In ad in Motion Picture News, July 10, 1926

David Sheridan, a forest ranger who teams up with Shirley Kane, an adventuress to go up against a gang of bandits. The gang is controlled by the mysterious Charles Redfield, whom none of the bandits have ever actually seen.

A number of airmail robberies has taken place, and J.B. Swinnerton, an airmail pilot is being blamed. Forest ranger Sheridan is out to prove who is really behind the series of spectacular armed robberies.

When all the protagonists are cut off from the outside world by a blizzard, the immense forces of nature force everyone to find a way to survive.

== Chapter titles ==
1. Storm Warnings
2. The Storm Starts
3. The Coming of Redfield
4. Redfield Strikes
5. Buried
6. The Enemy's Stronghold
7. The Trap
8. Thieves' Honor
9. Daybreak
10. The End of Redfield

== Cast ==
- Allene Ray as Shirley Kane
- Walter Miller as David Sheridan
- Frank Austin as J.B. Swinnerton
- Tom London as U.S. Marshal Thayer (credited as Leonard Clapham)
- Harry Martell as Dr. Byrd (credited as Harrison Martell)
- Charles West as Harron
- J.F. McCullough as Howard Kane
- Wally Oettel
- John Webb Dillion
- Natalie Warfield
- Ben Walker
- Bert Appling
- George Magrill
- Albert Kingsley

== Production ==
Filming for Snowed In took place in and around McCall, Idaho, in the Payette National Forest. Aircraft were staged out of McCall Municipal Airport in Valley County, Idaho.

== Reception ==
Aviation film historian Michael Paris in From the Wright Brothers to Top Gun: Aviation, Nationalism, and Popular Cinema compared Snowed In to other films that dealt with the airmail pilots who operated in Western United States. He listed The Air Mail (1925) and Flying High (1926),The Flying Mail (1926), Wolves of the Air (1927), and Pirates of the Sky (1927) that were also examples of the sub-genre of the "modern western adventure" that often had heroes mounted on aircraft, not horses. (Note: Pathé Exchange's Snowed In was a "profitable" serial.)

== Preservation status ==
Snowed In is now considered to be a lost film.

== See also ==
- List of film serials
- List of film serials by studio
