= The Fire Detective =

1929 film

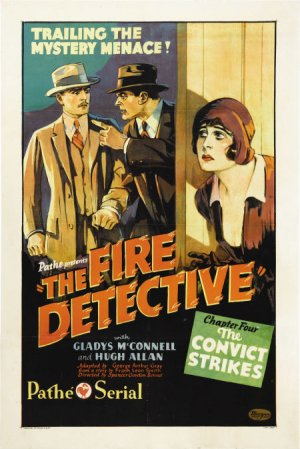
- Poster of chapter four
- Directed by: Spencer Gordon Bennet; Thomas Storey
- Written by: George Arthur Gray; Frank Leon Smith
- Starring: Gladys McConnell; Hugh Allan
- Distributed by: Pathé Exchange
- Release date: March 3, 1929
- Running time: 10 episodes
- Country: United States
- Language: Silent with English intertitles

The Fire Detective is a 1929 American adventure film serial directed by Spencer Gordon Bennet and Thomas Storey. The film is considered to be lost.

== Cast ==
- Gladys McConnell as Gladys Samuels
- Hugh Allan as Capt. Jeff Tarrant
- Leo D. Maloney as Chief Carson
- Frank Lackteen as Mr. Tarrant
- John Cossar as Dist. Atty. Samuels
- Larry Steers as Charles Lewis
- Bruce Gordon

== Chapter titles ==
1. The Arson Trail
2. The Pit of Darkness
3. The Hidden Hand
4. The Convict Strikes
5. On Flaming Waters
6. The Man of Mystery
7. The Ape Man
8. Back from Death
9. Menace of the Past
10. The Flame of Love

== See also ==
- List of film serials
- List of film serials by studio
