= Frank Lackteen =

American actor (1897–1968)

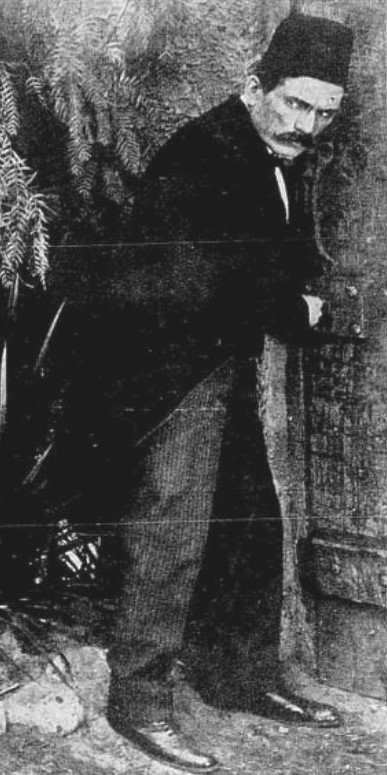
- From The Fortieth Door (1924)
- Born: August 29, 1897; Kab-Elias, Lebanon
- Died: July 8, 1968 (aged 70); Woodland Hills, Los Angeles, California, U.S.
- Occupation: Actor
- Years active: 1915–1965

Frank Lackteen (born Mohammed Hassan Lackteen August 29, 1897 – July 8, 1968) was an American film actor best known for his antagonistic roles. He appeared in nearly 200 films between 1915 and 1965, including several Three Stooges shorts.

== Biography ==
Lackteen was born in Kab-Elias, Lebanon, and attended an American school in Lebanon. He spent most of his childhood in Lawrence, Massachusetts.

Lackteen made his first American film in 1915 and was often seen as a villain in silent films. Many of his film appearances came in Westerns and serials.

He died from a respiratory failure on July 8, 1968, aged 70, in Woodland Hills, Los Angeles.

== Selected filmography ==
Film
| Year | Film | Role | Notes |
|---|---|---|---|
| 1921 | The Avenging Arrow | Pablo | |
| 1922 | White Eagle | Crouching More | |
| 1922 | The Timber Queen | Vance | |
| 1923 | Her Dangerous Path | Malay George | |
| 1924 | Leatherstocking | Briarthorn | |
| 1924 | The Fortieth Door | Hamid Bey | |
| 1924 | Into the Net | Dr. Vining | |
| 1925 | Idaho | Tex Osborne | |
| 1925 | Sunken Silver | Rodney Hade | |
| 1925 | The Green Archer | Julius Savini | |
| 1926 | The House Without a Key | Kaohla | |
| 1926 | Desert Gold | Yaqui | |
| 1926 | The Last Frontier | Pawnee Killer | |
| 1927 | Melting Millions | | |
| 1927 | The Warning | Tso Lin | |
| 1928 | Mark of the Frog | | |
| 1928 | Court Martial | 'Devil' Dawson | |
| 1928 | The Tiger's Shadow | Dr. Sandro | |
| 1929 | Hawk of the Hills | The Hawk | |
| 1929 | The Fire Detective | Mr. Tarrant | |
| 1929 | Queen of the Northwoods | Jacques De Brun | |
| 1929 | The Black Book | Valdez | |
| 1930 | The Jade Box | Cultist | Uncredited |
| 1930 | The Lash | a cabellero | |
| 1932 | Heroes of the West | Buckskin Joe | |
| 1932 | Come on Danger! | Piute | |
| 1933 | Treason | Chet Dawson | |
| 1936 | Isle of Fury | Old Native Lanar | |
| 1937 | I Cover the War | Mustapha the Beggar | |
| 1938 | Suez | Swami | Uncredited |
| 1939 | The Kansas Terrors | Captain Gonzalez | |
| 1940 | Strange Cargo | Convict | Uncredited |
| 1941 | Jungle Girl | Shamba | |
| 1942 | Arabian Nights | Bidder | Uncredited |
| 1943 | Chetniks! The Fighting Guerrillas | Major Danilov | |
| 1943 | For Whom the Bell Tolls | Elias' man | Uncredited |
| 1943 | Frontier Badmen | Cherokee | |
| 1943 | Sahara | Sheik Ali | Uncredited |
| 1944 | The Desert Hawk | Faud, the Chief Chamberlain | |
| 1945 | Can't Help Singing | Man with Gunfighter | Uncredited |
| 1946 | A Bird in the Head | Nikko | |
| 1947 | Trail of the Mounties | Pierre | |
| 1948 | Shivering Sherlocks | Red Watkins | |
| 1949 | Malice in the Palace | Affa Dolla | |
| 1950 | Kim | Chunder's Shadow | Uncredited |
| 1953 | Northern Patrol | Dancing Horse | |
| 1955 | Of Cash and Hash | Red Watkins | Reuse of scenes from Shivering Sherlocks |
| 1956 | The Ten Commandments | Old slave praying | Uncredited |
| 1957 | Flesh and the Spur | Havasupi Warrior Leader | |
Television
| Year | Title | Role | Notes |
| 1953 | Hopalong Cassidy | King Lasho | 1 episode |
| 1955 | GE True | Tom-Tom | 1 episode |
| 1958 | The Adventures of Wild Bill Hickok | Silver Horse | 1 episode |
| 1958 | Casey Jones | Chief | 1 episode |
| 1958 | The Adventures of Rin Tin Tin | Chieftain | 1 episode |
