= Sunken Silver =

1925 film

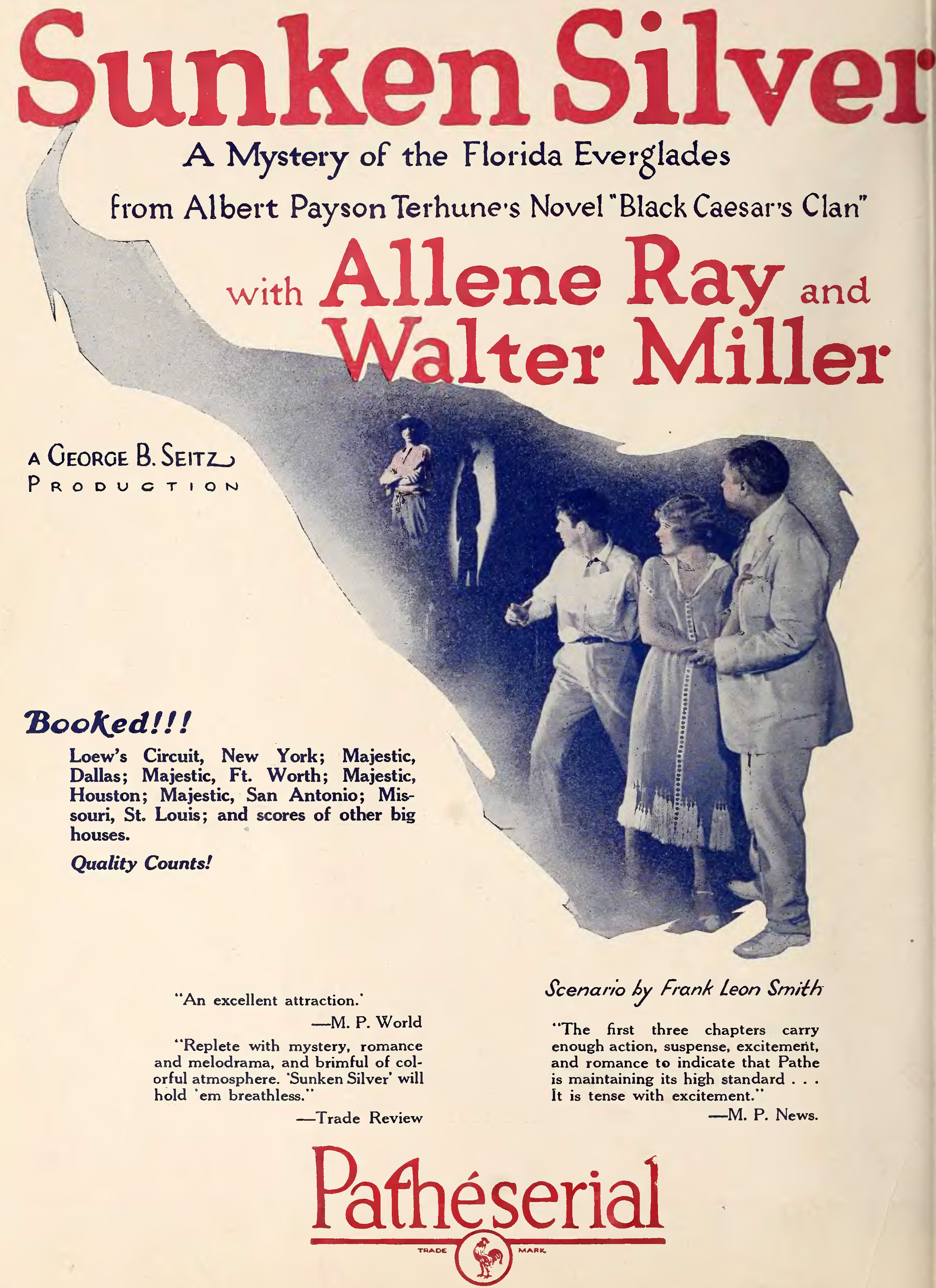
- Film poster
- Directed by: Spencer Gordon Bennet; George B. Seitz
- Written by: Frank Leon Smith
- Based on: Black Caesar's Clan by Albert Payson Terhune
- Starring: Allene Ray; Walter Miller
- Distributed by: Pathé Exchange
- Release date: May 10, 1925
- Running time: 10 episodes
- Country: United States
- Language: Silent (English intertitles)

Sunken Silver is a 1925 American silent film serial directed by Spencer Gordon Bennet and George B. Seitz. The serial is preserved at the UCLA Film & Television Archive.

== Plot ==
As described in a film magazine review, Brice, a secret service agent, seeks information regarding stolen silver which disappeared from the government in 1804. Hade and Milo seek the fortune for themselves, as do the "Conches," natives of Florida since the time the loot was buried. Claire, half-sister of Milo, falls in love with Brice. Brice is captured by Milo and Hade and taken to an island where he is to be killed. He is rescued by another secret service agent. Despite being thrown into a sea full of sharks, he escapes the island. Claire and Brice are captured by Conches, but then escape their camp. After they have returned to Claire's home, Milo advances on Brice just as the Conches attack the house using a secret tunnel. They are repulsed by a steam of boiling water poured into the tunnel. Hade is arrested, but escapes only to meet his death wandering in the Everglades. The government takes possession of the money and Brice takes possession of his new wife, Claire.

== Cast ==
- Allene Ray as Claire Standish
- Walter Miller as Gavin Brice
- Frank Lackteen as Rodney Hade
- Albert Roccardi as Conch Leader
- Jean Bronte as Bobby Burns
- Spencer Gordon Bennet as Doug (credited as Gordon Bennett)
- Charles Fang as Sato
- Ivan Linow as Rako
- Frank Wunderlee as Milo Standish

== Production ==
Sunken Silver was at least partially shot on location in Miami, and interiors were taken at Tilford Studios, also in Miami.

== See also ==
- List of film serials
- List of film serials by studio
