= The Yellow Cameo =

1928 film

- Directed by: Spencer Gordon Bennet
- Written by: George Arthur Gray
- Starring: Allene Ray; Edward Hearn
- Distributed by: Pathé Exchange
- Release date: June 3, 1928
- Running time: 10 episodes
- Country: United States
- Language: Silent with English intertitles

The Yellow Cameo is a 1928 American adventure film serial directed by Spencer Gordon Bennet. The film is now considered to be lost.

== Cast ==
- Allene Ray as Kay Cottrell
- Edward Hearn as Terry Lawton
- Cyclone the Dog as Cyclone, the Dog
- Noble Johnson as Smoke Dawson
- Tom London as Spraker
- Harry Semels as Black Gavin
- Frederick Dana as Sheriff
- Walter Shumway as Deputy Sheriff
- Frances Wilbur Winseman as Train Station Manager

== See also ==
- List of film serials
- List of film serials by studio
