= Play Ball (serial) =

1925 film

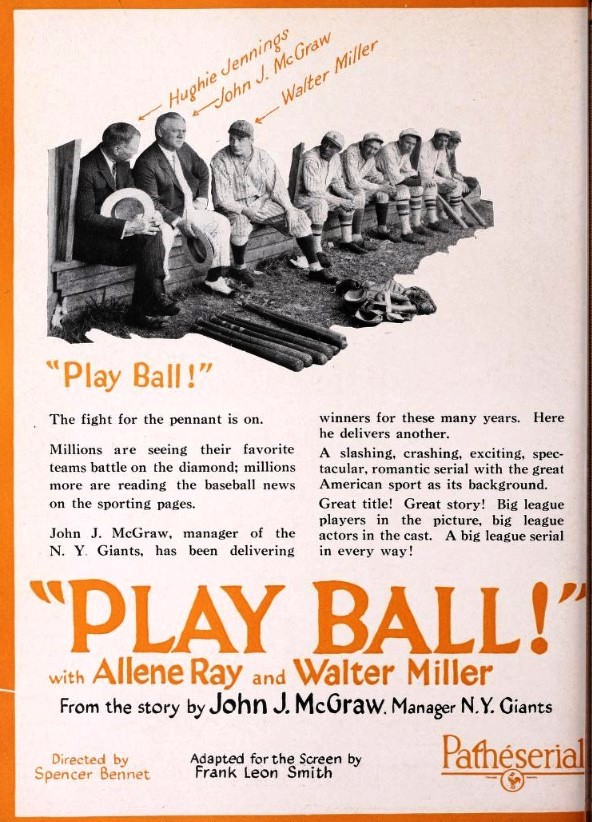
- Advertisement
- Directed by: Spencer Gordon Bennet
- Written by: Frank Leon Smith
- Produced by: Spencer Gordon Bennet
- Starring: Walter Miller; Allene Ray
- Cinematography: Horace G. Plympton
- Distributed by: Pathé Exchange
- Release date: July 19, 1925
- Running time: 10 episodes 2 reels each
- Country: United States
- Language: Silent (English intertitles)

Play Ball is a 1925 American drama film serial directed by Spencer Gordon Bennet and starring Walter Miller and Allene Ray. The film is now considered to be lost. Another 1925 film, a comedy short starring Chester Conklin and Milburn Morante, also used the title Play Ball.

== Cast ==
- Walter Miller as Jack Rollins
- Allene Ray as Doris Sutton
- Harry Semels as Count Segundo
- J. Barney Sherry as Thomas W. Sutton
- Mary Milnor as Maybelle Pratt
- Wally Oettel as Rutger Farnsworth
- Franklyn Hanna as Senator Hornell
- John McGraw as self
- New York Giants baseball team

== Chapter titles ==
1. "To the Rescue"
2. "The Flaming Float"
3. "Betrayed"
4. "The Decoy Wire"
5. "Face to Face"
6. "The Showdown"
7. "A Mission of Hate"
8. "Double Peril"
9. "Into Segundo’s Hands"
10. "A Home Plate Wedding"

== See also ==
- List of film serials
- List of film serials by studio
- List of lost films
