= The Fire Fighters (1927 film) =

1927 film

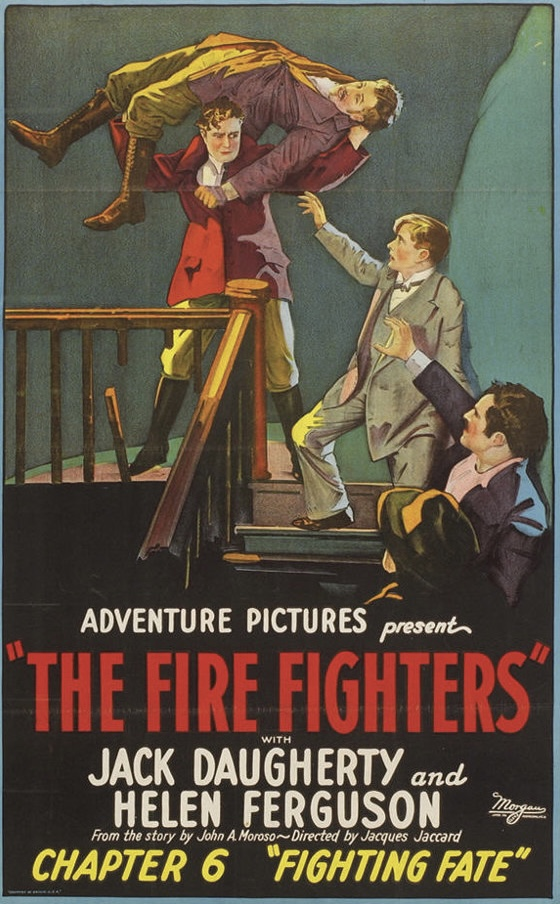
- Directed by: Jacques Jaccard
- Written by: John A. Moroso
- Starring: Jack Dougherty; Helen Ferguson
- Distributed by: Universal Pictures
- Release date: January 17, 1927
- Country: United States
- Languages: Silent; English intertitles

The Fire Fighters is a 1927 American action film serial directed by Jacques Jaccard. The film is considered to be lost.

== Plot ==
In this ten-chapter serial, Jack Dougherty plays a fire fighter who stands up to a villainous crime boss who caused his father's death.

== Cast ==
- Jack Dougherty as Jimmie Powers
- Helen Ferguson as Mary Kent
- Wilbur McGaugh
- Lafe McKee
- Al Hart (as Albert Hart)
- Florence Allen
- Robert Irwin
- Milton Brown (as Milt Brown)
- George German

== See also ==
- List of American films of 1927
- List of film serials
- List of film serials by studio
