= List of Bengali films =

List of Bengali films as a name may refer to:

- List of Bangladeshi films
- Lists of Indian Bengali films
