= Pirates of the Pines =

1928 film

- Directed by: J.C. Cook
- Starring: George O'Hara; Rita Roma
- Release date: September 1928
- Running time: 10 episodes
- Country: United States
- Language: Silent with English intertitles

Pirates of the Pines is a 1928 American drama film serial directed by J.C. Cook. The film is considered to be lost.

== Cast ==
- George O'Hara as John Markham
- Rita Roma
- Jack Mower
- Charles Middleton
- Sumner Getchell
- King Zany

== See also ==
- List of film serials
- List of film serials by studio
