= The Way of a Man =

1924 film

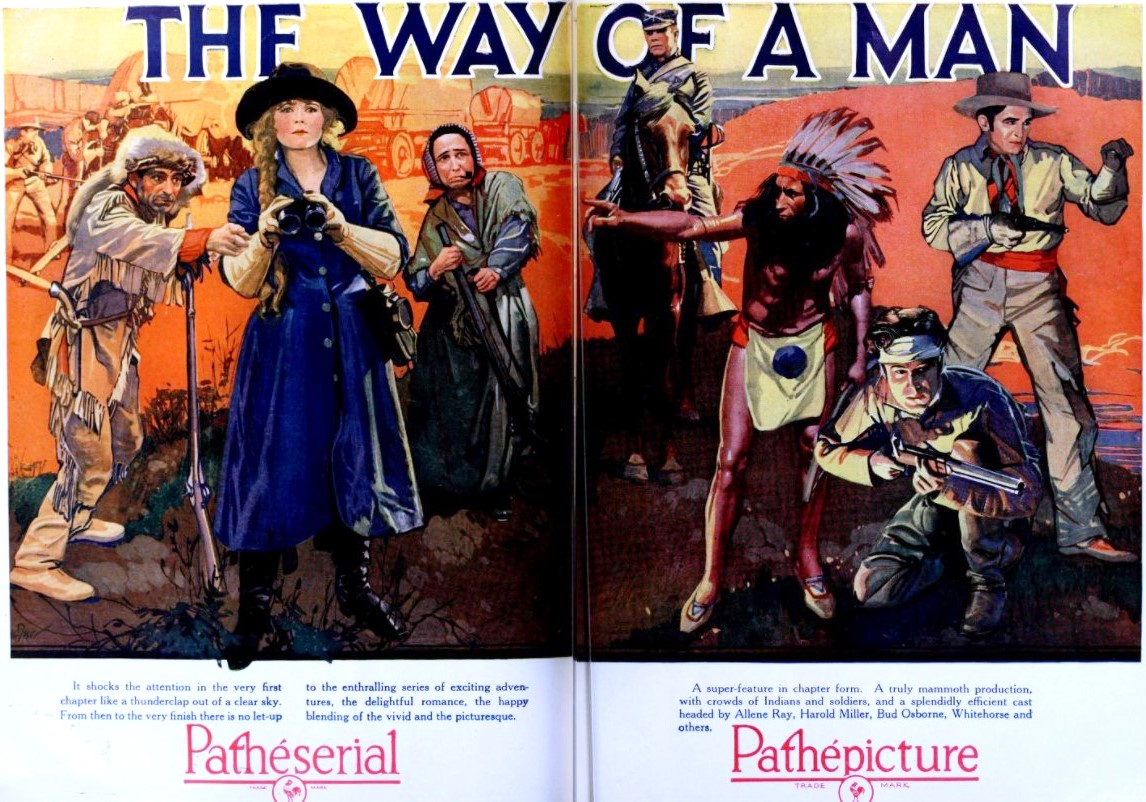
- Advertisement
- Directed by: George B. Seitz
- Based on: The Way of a Man by Emerson Hough
- Produced by: C. W. Patton
- Starring: Allene Ray; Harold Miller
- Distributed by: Pathé Exchange
- Release date: January 20, 1924
- Running time: 10 episodes
- Country: United States
- Language: Silent (English intertitles)

The Way of a Man is a 1924 American silent Western film serial directed by George B. Seitz. Pathé Exchange also released it as a 9-reel film later in 1924. Both the serial and the film version are considered to be lost.

== Plot ==
As described in a film magazine review, on his father's death, John Cowles goes West and meets and falls in love with Ellen Meriwether, daughter of Colonel Meriwether. Through the treachery of Gordon Orme, their convoy is nearly destroyed in an Indian attack. Later, John and his mother join the California Gold Rush. The gold camp is attacked by outlaws led by Gordon Orme, but the bandits are defeated. John wins the affections of Ellen. The plot given is that of the serial, but this differs drastically from that of the book, very little takes place in the West and none in California.

== Cast ==
- Allene Ray as Ellen Meriwether
- Harold Miller as John Cowles
- Bud Osborne as Gordon Orme
- Lillian Gale as Mandy McGovern
- White Horse as Auberry
- Kathryn Appleton as Grace Sheraton
- Chet Ryan as Andy
- Lillian Adrian as Carmencita
- Florence Lee as Mrs. Cowles

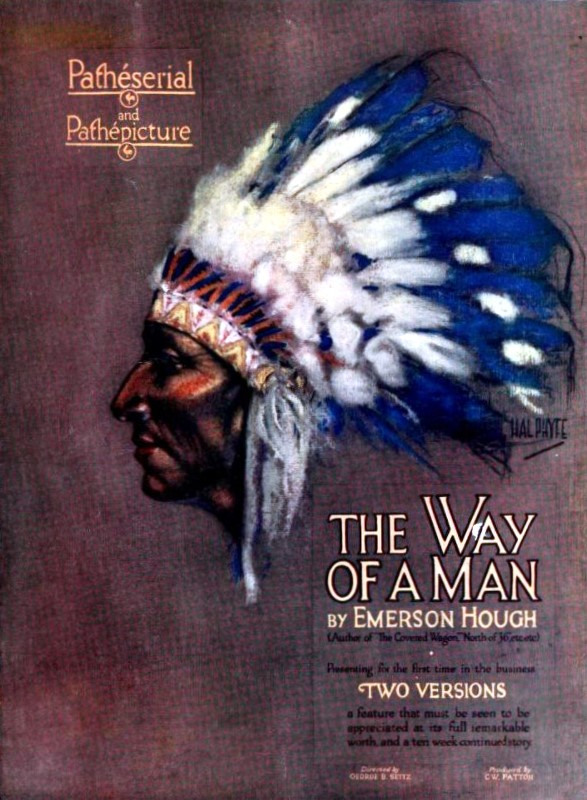
Advertisement

== Chapter titles ==
1. Into the Unknown
2. Redskin and White
3. In the Toils of the Torrent
4. Lost in the Wilds
5. White Medicine
6. The Firing Squad
7. Gold! Gold!
8. The Fugitive
9. California
10. Trail's End

== See also ==
- List of film serials
- List of film serials by studio
- List of lost films
