= Walter Miller (actor) =

American actor

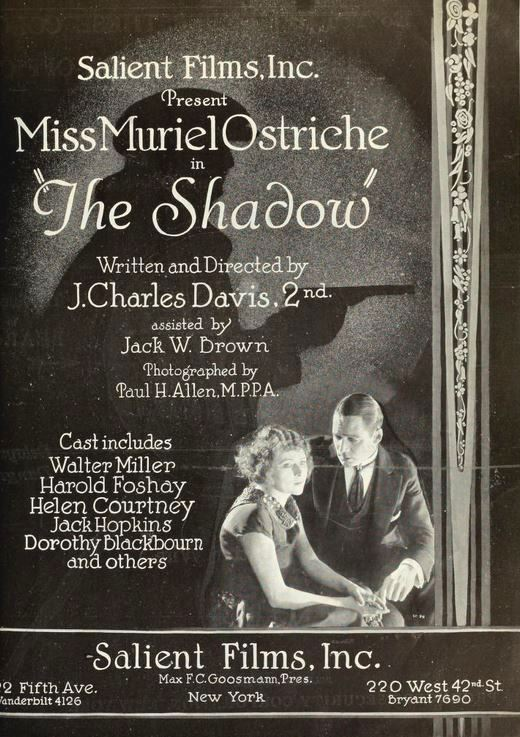
- Miller with Muriel Ostriche in ad for The Shadow, 1921
- Born: March 9, 1892; Dayton, Ohio, U.S.
- Died: March 30, 1940 (aged 48); Hollywood, California, U.S.
- Burial place: Calvary Cemetery
- Occupation: Actor
- Years active: 1911–1940

Walter Miller (March 9, 1892 – March 30, 1940) was an American actor of the silent era and the early sound era. He appeared in nearly 250 films between 1911 and 1940.

Born William Corwin Miller in Dayton, Ohio, the young man developed an interest in the theater. Like some young actors whose lack of experience gave them fewer opportunities on the stage, the 19-year-old Miller entered the pioneering motion picture industry and joined the Biograph Company in 1911, where he worked with D. W. Griffith.

Miller established himself as an expressive character actor, with a muscular frame and rock-jawed features, and received starring, co-starring, or featured roles in action pictures. He worked with many leading actresses of the silent screen, including Mary Pickford, Blanche Sweet, Lillian Gish, and Betty Compson. By the late 1920s he was a popular lead in serials, often opposite Allene Ray in such titles as The Way of a Man (1924), Sunken Silver (1925), Hawk of the Hills, and The Black Book (1929). The Miller-Ray partnership came to a sudden end in 1929, when the new talking-picture technology revealed that Ray's high, squeaky voice didn't fit her adventurous screen personality. Miller, whose speaking voice had matured into a hearty baritone, made the transition from silent to sound pictures successfully. He was equally at ease playing heroes and villains. Miller was especially valuable to low-budget producers like John Freuler, Aubrey Kennedy, and Nat Levine, who could rely on Miller's stage presence and efficiency with dialogue to keep their productions on schedule.

He returned briefly to leading roles in 1931 when Spencer Gordon Bennet, one of his serial directors, cast him in two-reel short subjects, which Bennet produced and directed for RKO release. Miller played real-life detective Nick Harris in the "True Detective Stories of Celebrated Cases" series.

In the 1930s Walter Miller became a fixture at Universal Pictures, appearing in eight serials and numerous features. His most prominent appearance of the sound era was one of his last. In the 1938 Weiss Bros. serial The Secret of Treasure Island, released by Columbia Pictures, Miller was a last-minute replacement for Bela Lugosi. Miller, as the stern, domineering master of an island, was determined to locate long-lost pirate treasure. The actor turned in a bravura performance in the final chapter, where he actually finds the treasure but plunges into mania when he cannot escape.

Miller kept working in features and serials until 1940, when he suffered a fatal heart attack during the filming of the Gene Autry western Gaucho Serenade. He was 48. He is buried at Calvary Cemetery in Evanston, Illinois.

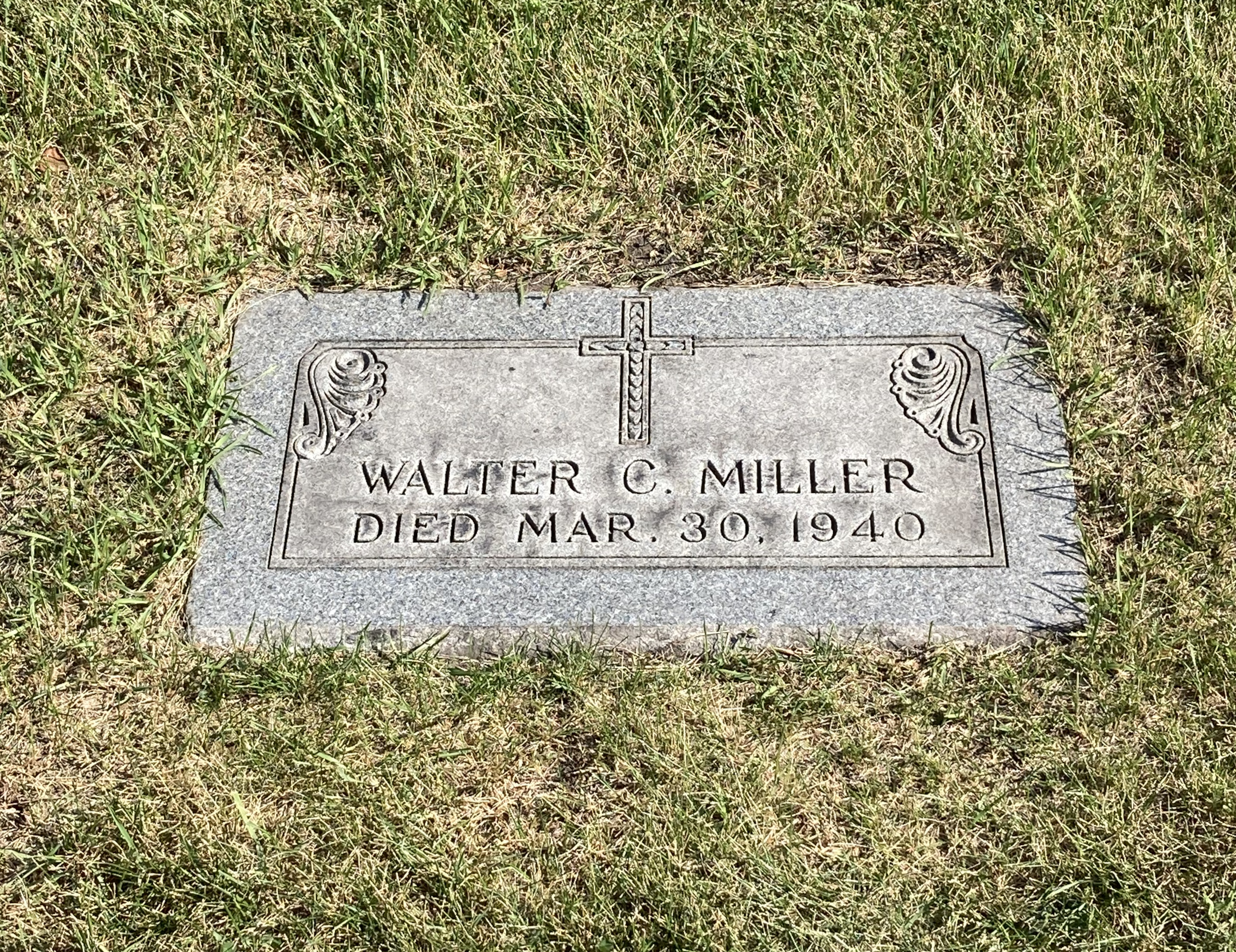
Miller's grave at Calvary Cemetery

== Selected filmography ==
- A Change of Spirit (1912, short)
- An Unseen Enemy (1912, short)
- Two Daughters of Eve (1912, short)
- So Near, Yet So Far (1912, short)
- A Feud in the Kentucky Hills (1912, short)
- The Painted Lady (1912, short)
- The Musketeers of Pig Alley (1912, short)
- My Baby (1912, short)
- The Informer (1912, short)
- Brutality (1912, short)
- A Cry for Help (1912, short)
- An Adventure in the Autumn Woods (1913, short)
- Oil and Water (1913, short)
- Love in an Apartment Hotel (1913, short)
- The Wrong Bottle (1913, short)
- Broken Ways (1913, short)
- Near to Earth (1913, short)
- The Hero of Little Italy (1913, short)
- The Little Tease (1913, short)
- A Frightful Blunder (1913, short)
- The Wanderer (1913, short)
- The House of Darkness (1913, short)
- The Yaqui Cur (1913, short)
- Red Hicks Defies the World (1913, short)
- Death's Marathon (1913, short)
- The Mothering Heart (1913, short)
- In Diplomatic Circles (1913, short)
- A Gamble with Death (1913, short)
- Under the Shadow of the Law (1913, short)
- Two Men of the Desert (1913, short)
- A Modest Hero (1913, short)
- Lord Chumley (1914, short)
- Tangled Lives (1917)
- Miss Robinson Crusoe (1917)
- Draft 258 (1917)
- The Eleventh Commandment (1918)
- With Neatness and Dispatch (1918)
- Thin Ice (1919)
- A Girl at Bay (1919)
- The Revenge of Tarzan (1920)
- The Invisible Divorce (1920)
- The Way Women Love (1920)
- Luxury (1921)
- The Bootleggers (1922)
- Unconquered Woman (1922)
- The Rapids (1922)
- The Woman Who Believed (1922)
- Till We Meet Again (1922)
- The Tie That Binds (1923)
- Unseeing Eyes (1923)
- Those Who Judge (1924)
- Playthings of Desire (1924)
- Sunken Silver (1925)
- The Sky Raider (1925)
- Play Ball (1925, serial)
- The Green Archer (1925, serial)
- Snowed In (1926, serial)
- The Unfair Sex (1926)
- The Fighting Marine (1926)
- The House Without a Key (1926, serial)
- Melting Millions (1927)
- Hawk of the Hills (1927, serial)
- The Man Without a Face (1928, serial)
- The Terrible People (1928)
- The Mysterious Airman (1928, serial)
- Manhattan Knights (1928)
- Queen of the Northwoods (1929)
- The Black Book (1929, serial)
- The King of the Kongo (1929, serial)
- Rogue of the Rio Grande (1930)
- The Lone Defender (1930, serial)
- The Utah Kid (1930)
- King of the Wild (1931, serial)
- Hell's Valley (1931)
- Swanee River (1931)
- The Hurricane Horseman (1931)
- Sky Raiders (1931)
- The Galloping Ghost (1931, serial)
- The Shadow of the Eagle (1932, serial)
- The Last of the Mohicans (1932, serial)
- The Face on the Barroom Floor (1932)
- Ridin' for Justice (1932)
- Behind Jury Doors (1932)
- Ghost City (1932)
- Maizie (1933)
- Night Cargo (1936)
- The Unknown Ranger (1936)
- The Fugitive Sheriff (1936)
- Ranger Courage (1936)
- China Clipper (1936) as Instructor (uncredited)
- Saturday's Heroes (1937)
- Danger Patrol (1937)
- Wild Horse Rodeo (1937)
- The Secret of Treasure Island (1938, serial)
- Come On, Leathernecks! (1938)
- Crime Ring (1938)
- Lawless Valley (1938)
- Dick Tracy's G-Men (1939, serial)
- Gaucho Serenade (1940)
