= On Guard (serial) =

1927 film

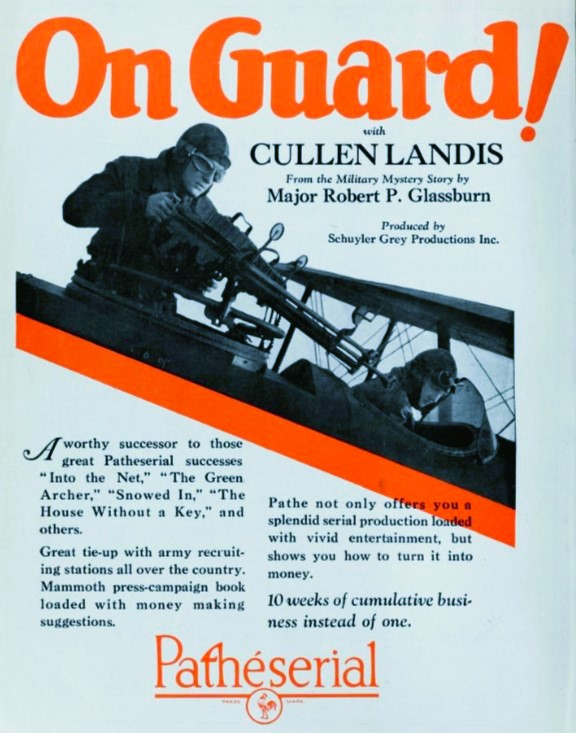
- Advertisement
- Directed by: Arch Heath
- Written by: Paul Fairfax Fuller; Robert Glassburn
- Starring: Cullen Landis; Muriel Kingston
- Distributed by: Pathé Exchange
- Release date: January 30, 1927
- Running time: 10 episodes
- Country: United States
- Language: Silent (English intertitles)

On Guard, also listed as On Guard!, is a 1927 American drama film serial directed by Arch Heath. It is considered to be lost.

== Cast ==
- Cullen Landis as Bob Adams
- Muriel Kingston as Betty Lee
- Louise Du Pre as Catherine Nevens
- Walter P. Lewis as James Stagg
- Tom Blake as Sergeant Major Murphy
- Charles Martin as Colonel King
- Edward Burns as Jackson
- Jack Bardette
- Gus De Weil
- Tom Poland
- Harry Semels
- George F. Kelley
- Hal Forde

== Chapter titles ==
1. Enemies Within
2. Deception
3. Silent Evidence
4. The Sinister Warning
5. False Orders
6. Stolen Papers
7. Hidden Watchers
8. The Counterplot
9. The Air Battle
10. Foiled

== Production ==
The serial was partially shot on location at Fort Hoyle and at an unnamed studio on Long Island.

== See also ==
- List of film serials
- List of film serials by studio
