= Allene Ray =

American actress

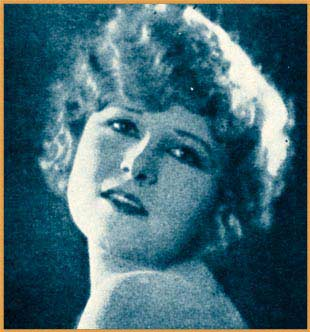
- Allene Ray from Famous Film Folk: A Gallery of Life Portraits and Biographies, 1925
- Born: January 2, 1901; Devine, Texas, U.S.
- Died: May 5, 1979 (aged 78); Temple City, California, U.S.
- Occupation: Actress
- Spouse: William "Larry" Wheeler (1925-1958, his death)

Allene Ray (born Allene Ray Burch; January 2, 1901 – May 5, 1979) was an American film actress.

== Early years ==
Born in Devine, Texas, Ray grew up on her father's ranch with her four sisters and two brothers. She was learning to ride by age 3, and by age 20 she had become "an accomplished horsewoman."

Her first job related to films was selling tickets at a movie theater, and her first appearance on film came when Harry Myers arrived in Texas. He shot two reels of film with Ray before he left. Her next opportunity in film came in 1920 when she won a publishing company's beauty contest after her sister submitted her picture as an entry.

== Career ==
Winning the contest led to her signing with a talent agency, which dropped her last name for professional purposes. She made two films in Texas for the Sawyer and Lubin agency before Metro-Goldwyn-Mayer bought her contract.

Ray became a serial heroine for Pathe Pictures, acting and performing stunts that included riding her horse, "teetering on the roofs of buildings and jumping into lakes". She explained during an interview in 1978 that the company did not hire stunt people; each actor and actress had to do his or her stunts.

Her screen credits include Honeymoon Ranch (1920), West of the Rio Grande (1921) and Partners of the Sunset (1922). The latter she made for the Lubin Corporation. In making The Fortieth Door (1924), Ray decided to wear a brunette wig as the film featured an Egyptian heroine. She was teamed with action star Walter Miller for a long string of serials, including The Way of a Man (1924), Sunken Silver (1925), Hawk of the Hills (1927), and The Black Book (1929). The Miller-Ray partnership ended abruptly in 1929, when the new talking-picture technology revealed that Ray's high, piping voice didn't fit her adventurous screen personality.

Allene Ray did make a few talking pictures, playing undemanding ingenue roles in only five more films: the first talking B-Western feature Overland Bound (1929), the first talking Western serial The Indians Are Coming (1930), Westward Bound (1930), Gun Cargo (filmed in 1930, unreleased until 1949), and The Phantom (1931).

== Personal life ==
On July 20, 1925, Ray married film producer Larry Wheeler in Tijuana, Mexico. After she left the film business in 1931, Ray worked as a seamstress and a fitter in Temple City, California, after which she enrolled in a real-estate school and passed a test to become a broker. She worked with her husband, who had also left motion pictures for a career in real estate.

In 1940, they moved to Temple City, California, and remained married until his death in 1958. She continued as a realtor until she retired in 1965.She died from cancer in 1979, aged 78, in Temple City.

== Partial filmography ==
- Your Friend and Mine (1923)
- Times Have Changed (1923)
- The Way of a Man (1924)
- The Fortieth Door (1924)
- Ten Scars Make a Man (1924)
- Galloping Hoofs (1924)
- Sunken Silver (1925)
- Play Ball (1925)
- The Green Archer (1925)
- Snowed In (1926)
- The House Without a Key (1926)
- Melting Millions (1927)
- Hawk of the Hills (1927)
- The Man Without a Face (1928)
- The Yellow Cameo (1928)
- The Terrible People (1928)
- Overland Bound (1929)
- The Black Book (1929)
- The Indians Are Coming (1930)
- Westward Bound (1930)
- The Phantom (1931)
