= Spencer Gordon Bennet =

American film director (1893–1987)

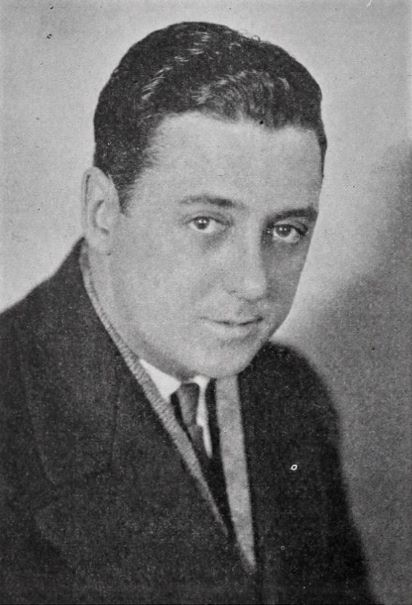
- From a 1925 magazine
- Born: January 5, 1893; Brooklyn, New York City, US
- Died: October 8, 1987 (aged 94); Santa Monica, California, US
- Other names: Spencer Bennet, Spencer G. Bennet
- Occupations: Film director, film producer
- Years active: 1921–1974

Spencer Gordon Bennet (January 5, 1893 – October 8, 1987) was an American film producer and director. Known as the "King of Serial Directors", he directed more film serials than any other director.

== Biography ==
Born in Brooklyn, New York, Bennet first entered show business as a stunt man, when he answered a newspaper ad to jump from the Palisades of the Hudson River while wearing a suit for the serial film Hurricane Hutch (1921). The gig at that time paid $1 per foot he had to fall.

Bennet made his directorial debut in 1921's Behold the Man but made his serial directorial debut in 1925 with Sunken Silver. Many of his silent serials starred Walter Miller. When the advent of talking pictures ended the Miller series, Bennet began freelancing for various studios. In 1931 Bennet produced and directed a series of two-reel detective mysteries, "True Detective Stories of Celebrated Cases", for RKO release. Bennet recruited Walter Miller to star as real-life detective Nick Harris.

During the 1930s, Bennet directed action features and westerns, often at Mayfair Pictures, Weiss Bros., and Columbia Pictures. While regarded as a serial specialist, he directed only two serials during the decade, The Last Frontier (1932, for Van Beuren) and Young Eagles (1934, for Romance Productions).

In 1942, Bennet returned to Columbia, where he directed two serials, The Valley of Vanishing Men (1942) and The Secret Code (1943). Bennet then moved to Republic Pictures, where he directed many successful serials and features, including two entries in the Red Ryder series, featuring Wild Bill Elliott or Allan "Rocky" Lane.

== Later career ==
In 1947, Bennet interviewed with producer Sam Katzman, then producing serials for Columbia. Katzman, notoriously stingy, thought Bennet's salary demand was much too expensive and ended the interview abruptly. Bennet said he could have saved Katzman lots of money on laboratory expenses, because he knew how to get his scenes in the fewest possible takes without wasting film. That remark changed Katzman's mind, and Bennet joined Columbia's serial staff. He demonstrated his efficiency to Katzman, who put Bennet in charge of all the serials through the end of 1955. His last two serials were Perils of the Wilderness (filmed in June 1955) and Blazing the Overland Trail (filmed in late 1955 and released in 1956).

Bennet also worked briefly in television, directing eight episodes of the Ramar of the Jungle series. In the same vein, Bennet had already begun directing features in the Jungle Jim series with Johnny Weissmuller.

After the serials ended, Bennet directed a handful of features, his final directorial credit being 1965's The Bounty Killer, which was also the final film to feature pioneering cowboy star Broncho Billy Anderson. When he died in 1987, he was buried at the Forest Lawn, Hollywood Hills Cemetery in Los Angeles, his tombstone was engraved "His Final Chapter".

== Legacy ==
Over his career, Bennet directed more than 100 serials, including the two Superman serials Superman and Atom Man vs. Superman both starring Kirk Alyn; and the second Batman serial Batman and Robin. He also directed or co-directed The Masked Marvel; G-Men vs. the Black Dragon and Secret Service in Darkest Africa both starring Rod Cameron as federal agent Rex Bennett; Zorro's Black Whip; The Purple Monster Strikes; the Adventures of Sir Galahad; The Tiger Woman; Captain Video: Master of the Stratosphere; and numerous western serials.

== Preservation ==
The Academy Film Archive preserved two of Spencer Gordon Bennet's films, Hawk of the Hills and Snowed In.

== Partial filmography ==
- Sunken Silver (1925)
- The Green Archer (1925)
- The House Without a Key (1926)
- Marked Money (1928)
- Queen of the Northwoods (1929)
- Rogue of the Rio Grande (1930)
- The Last Frontier (1932)
- Badge of Honor (1934)
- Rescue Squad (1935)
- Western Courage (1935)
- Ranger Courage (1936)
- Rio Grande Ranger (1936)
- The Fugitive Sheriff (1936)
- The Unknown Ranger (1936)
- The Mysterious Pilot (1937)
- Oklahoma Terror (1939)
- The Secret Code (1942)
- The Valley of Vanishing Men (1942)
- G-Men vs. the Black Dragon (1943)
- Secret Service in Darkest Africa (1943)
- The Masked Marvel (1943)
- Canyon City (1943)
- The Tiger Woman (1944)
- Haunted Harbor (1944)
- Zorro's Black Whip (1944)
- Manhunt on Mystery Island (1945)
- Federal Operator 99 (1945)
- The Purple Monster Strikes (1945)
- The Phantom Rider (1946)
- King of the Forest Rangers (1946)
- Daughter of Don Q (1946)
- Son of Zorro (1947)
- The Black Widow (1947)
- Brick Bradford (1947)
- Superman (1948)
- Congo Bill (1948)
- Bruce Gentry – Daredevil of the Skies (1948)
- Batman and Robin (1949)
- Adventures of Sir Galahad (1949)
- Cody of the Pony Express (1950)
- Atom Man vs. Superman (1950)
- Pirates of the High Seas (1950)
- Roar of the Iron Horse (1951)
- Mysterious Island (1951)
- King of the Congo (1952)
- Brave Warrior (1952)
- The Miraculous Blackhawk: Freedom's Champion (1952)
- Son of Geronimo (1952)
- Voodoo Tiger (1952)
- The Lost Planet (1953)
- Killer Ape (1953)
- Gunfighters of the Northwest (1954)
- Riding with Buffalo Bill (1954)
- Adventures of Captain Africa Mighty Jungle Avenger! (1955)
- Devil Goddess (1955)
- Perils of the Wilderness (1956)
- Blazing the Overland Trail (1956)
- The Atomic Submarine (1959)
