= List of adventure films before 1920 =

A list of adventure films released before the 1920s.

Title	Director	Cast	Country	Notes
1900
Attack on a China Mission	James Williamson		United Kingdom	Short film
Cyrano de Bergerac	Clément Maurice	Benoît-Constant Coquelin	France	Short film
1907
Fanfan la Tulipe	Alice Guy-Blaché		France	Short film
The Fencing Master			United States	Short film
Løvejagten	Viggo Larsen	Viggo Larsen, Knud Lumbye	Denmark	Short film
1908
The Pirate's Gold	D. W. Griffith	George Gebhardt, Linda Arvidson	United States	Short film, pirate film
1909
I tre moschettieri	Mario Caserini	Maria Caserini	Italy	Short film
1911
L'Odissea	Francesco Bertolini, Adolfo Padovan	Giuseppe de Liguoro	Italy	
1912
Robin Hood	Étienne Arnaud, Herbert Blaché	Robert Frazer, Barbara Tennant, Alec B. Francis	United States	
Les Trois Mousquetaires	André Calmettes, Henri Pouctal	Émile Dehelly, Marcel Vibert, Nelly Cormon, Jean Peyrière	France	
1913
The Adventures of Kathlyn	Francis J. Grandon	Kathlyn Williams, Tom Santschi, Charles Clary	United States	Serial
Le avventure straordinarissime di Saturnino Farandola	Marcel Fabre	Marcel Fabre	Italy	Science fiction adventure, adventure comedy
Hussein il pirata	Gennaro Righelli	Gennaro Righelli	Italy	
Ivanhoe	Herbert Brenon	King Baggot, Leah Baird, Herbert Brenon	United States	
Ivanhoe	Leedham Bantock	Lauderdale Maitland	United Kingdom	
The Prisoner of Zenda	Edwin S. Porter, Hugh Ford	James K. Hackett, Beatrice Beckley, David Torrence	United States	
The Sea Wolf	Hobart Bosworth	Hobart Bosworth, Herbert Rawlinson, Viola Barry	United States	Sea adventure
Thor, Lord of the Jungle	Colin Campbell	Kathlyn Williams, Tom Santschi, Charles Clary	United States	
1914
Cabiria	Giovanni Pastrone	Lidia Quaranta, Umberto Mozzato, Bartolomeo Pagano, Italia Almirante Manzini	Italy	Epic adventure
The Hazards of Helen	J.P. McGowan, James Davis	Helen Holmes, Helen Gibson	United States	Railroad adventure. (serial - continued until 1917).
The Last Chapter	William Desmond Taylor	Carlyle Blackwell	United States	
McVeagh of the South Seas	Cyril Bruce, Harry Carey	Harry Carey, Fern Foster	United States	South sea adventure
The Pride of Jennico	J. Searle Dawley	House Peters	United States	
Soldiers of Fortune	William F. Haddock	Dustin Farnum	United States	
The Spoilers	Colin Campbell	William Farnum	United States	
Zapata's Gang	Urban Gad	Asta Nielsen	German Empire	Adventure comedy
1915
Brigadier Gerard	Bert Haldane	Lewis Waller	United Kingdom	
Captain Macklin	John B. O'Brien	Jack Conway, Lillian Gish	United States	
The Dictator	Oscar Eagle	John Barrymore	United States	Adventure comedy
The Explorer	George Melford	Lou Tellegen	United States	
Filibus	Mario Roncoroni	Cristina Ruspoli	Italy	
Hearts and the Highway	Wilfrid North	Lillian Walker	United States	
Peer Gynt	Oscar Apfel, Raoul Walsh	Cyril Maude	United States	
Under the Crescent	Burton L. King	Ola Humphrey, William C. Dowlan, Edward Sloman	United States	Serial, romantic adventure
Under the Red Robe	Wilfred Noy	Owen Roughwood	United Kingdom	
1916
20,000 Leagues Under The Sea	Stuart Paton	Lois Alexander, Curtis Benton, Wallace Clarke	United States	
American Aristocracy	Lloyd Ingraham	Douglas Fairbanks	United States	
Beau Brocade	Thomas Bentley	Mercy Hatton, Charles Rock, Austin Leigh	United Kingdom	
The Beggar of Cawnpore	Charles Swickard	H. B. Warner, Lola May	United States	
Bullets and Brown Eyes	Scott Sidney	William Desmond, Bessie Barriscale	United States	
Daphne and the Pirate	Christy Cabanne	Lillian Gish	United States	Pirate film
The Three Musketeers	Charles Swickard	Orrin Johnson	United States	
To Have and to Hold	George Melford	Mae Murray, Wallace Reid	United States	
Under Two Flags	J. Gordon Edwards	Theda Bara, Herbert Heyes	United States	
Unter heißer Zone	Harry Piel	Mogens Enger, Martha Novelly, Preben J. Rist, Victor Janson	German Empire	
1917
The Lad and the Lion	Alfred E. Green	Vivian Reed, Will Machin, Charles Le Moyne	United States	
The Laughing Cavalier	A. V. Bramble, Eliot Stannard	Mercy Hatton, George Bellamy, Edward O'Neill, A.V. Bramble	United Kingdom	
The Man Without a Country	Ernest C. Warde	Florence La Badie, Holmes Herbert, J.H. Gilmour	United States	
The Mystery Ship	Harry Harvey, Henry MacRae	Ben F. Wilson, Neva Gerber, Kingsley Benedict	United States	Serial
Tom Sawyer	William Desmond Taylor	Jack Pickford, Edythe Chapman, Helen Gilmore, Carl Goetz	United States	
When a Man Sees Red	Frank Lloyd	William Farnum	United States	Sea adventure
The White Terror	Harry Piel	Tilly Bébé, Bruno Eichgrün, Preben J. Rist	German Empire	
1918
Bound in Morocco	Allan Dwan	Douglas Fairbanks	United States	
The Claw	Robert G. Vignola	Clara Kimball Young, Milton Sills, Jack Holt	United States	
Eye for Eye	Albert Capellani	Alla Nazimova	United States	
The Lion's Claws	Harry Harvey, Jacques Jaccard	Marie Walcamp	United States	Serial
The Mystery of Bangalore	Alexander Antalffy, Paul Leni	Conrad Veidt, Harry Liedtke, Gilda Langer	German Empire	
The Romance of Tarzan	Wilfred Lucas	Elmo Lincoln, Enid Markey	United States	
Tarzan of the Apes	Scott Sidney	Elmo Lincoln, Enid Markey	United States	First Tarzan film
The White Man's Law	James Young	Sessue Hayakawa, Jack Holt, Florence Vidor	United States	
1919
Around the World in Eighty Days	Richard Oswald	Conrad Veidt, Anita Berber, Reinhold Schünzel	Germany	
The Elusive Pimpernel	Maurice Elvey	Cecil Humphreys, Marie Blanche, Norman Page	United Kingdom	
The Jungle Trail	Richard Stanton	William Farnum	United States	
The Mistress of the World	Joe May	Mia May, Michael Bohnen, Henry Sze, Paul Hansen, Hans Mierendorff	Germany	Serial
The Perils of Thunder Mountain	Robert N. Bradbury, W. J. Burman	Antonio Moreno, Carol Holloway	United States	Serial
Soldiers of Fortune	Allan Dwan	Norman Kerry, Pauline Starke, Anna Q. Nilsson, Wallace Beery	United States	
Spiders, Part 1: The Golden Lake	Fritz Lang	Lil Dagover, Carl de Vogt, Georg John, Ressel Orla	Germany	
Vendetta	Georg Jacoby	Pola Negri, Emil Jannings, Harry Liedtke	Germany	
Victory	Maurice Tourneur	Jack Holt, Seena Owen, Lon Chaney, Wallace Beery	United States	
