= Marcelo Pérez =

Marcelo Pérez may refer to:

- Marcelo Pérez (priest) (1974–2024), murdered Mexican priest
- Marcelo Pérez (footballer, born 1994), Chilean football left-back
- Marcelo Pérez (footballer, born 2001), Paraguayan football striker for Huracán

== See also ==
- Marcel Perez (1884-1929), Spanish silent film actor
