= For Freedom =

For Freedom may refer to:

- For Freedom (1918 film), silent film
- For Freedom (1940 film), British film
- For Freedom, EP by Avalon
- For Frihed ("For Freedom"), Danish organisation
