= Brocade (disambiguation) =

Brocade is a class of richly decorative shuttle-woven fabrics.

It may also refer to:

- Brocade (horse) (1981–2003), British Thoroughbred racehorse
- Beau Brocade, a fictional masked highway man
- Brocade Communications Systems, a telecommunications company

== See also ==
- Dusky Brocade
