= Romeo and Juliet (1900 film) =

1900 film by Clément Maurice

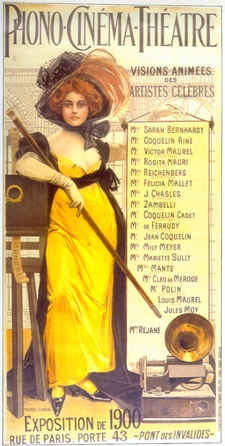
- Poster, designed by François Flameng, featuring Sarah Bernhardt and giving the names of eighteen other "famous artists" shown in "living visions" at the 1900 Paris Exposition using the Gratioulet-Lioret system of sound film . Phono-Cinéma-Théâtre, rue de Paris, Exposition Universelle 1900, Paris.
- Directed by: Clément Maurice
- Based on: Romeo and Juliet; 1597 play by William Shakespeare
- Produced by: Phono-Cinéma-Théâtre
- Starring: Emilio Cossira
- Music by: Charles Gounod
- Release date: 1900
- Running time: 1 minute, 59 seconds
- Country: France
- Language: Silent

Roméo et Juliette is a 1900 French film adaptation of the classic and famous William Shakespeare play, Romeo and Juliet.

== Cast ==
- Emilio Cossira as Romeo

== Production ==
This film version was directed by Clément Maurice and featured Emilio Cossira singing a tenor aria from Charles Gounod's Roméo et Juliette. It is believed to be the earliest film adaptation of the Shakespeare classic.

The film was produced by "Phono-Cinéma-Théâtre", which premiered one of the first synchronized sound film systems at the Paris exhibition of 1900, with this film being one of the earliest to use the sound technique. The sound was recorded first using a Lioretograph onto a cellophane cylinder. This was then played back, and the actors filmed lip-syncing to the recording. To view the film, the sound was played back and the projectionist altered the speed of the hand-cranked projector to try to match the playback.

Cossira was among 18 celebrities featured in Phono-Cinéma-Théâtre works at the Exposition Universelle in Paris in 1900. Another Shakespearean adaptation was Sarah Bernhardt as Hamlet in Le Duel d'Hamlet, the earliest film adaptation of Hamlet. Among the better known of these is a film adaptation of Edmond Rostand's play Cyrano de Bergerac, also directed by Maurice.

== See also ==
- List of lost films

== Sources ==
- Abel, Richard (2005). Encyclopedia of Early Cinema. Taylor & Francis. ISBN 9780415234405.
- Ball, Robert Hamilton (2013). "The Beginnings of Shakespeare Film 1899–1907". Shakespeare on Silent Film: A Strange Eventful History. Routledge Library Editions: Film and Literature. Vol. 1. Routledge. pp. 21–37. ISBN 9781134980840.
