= The Auction Block (1926 film) =

1926 film

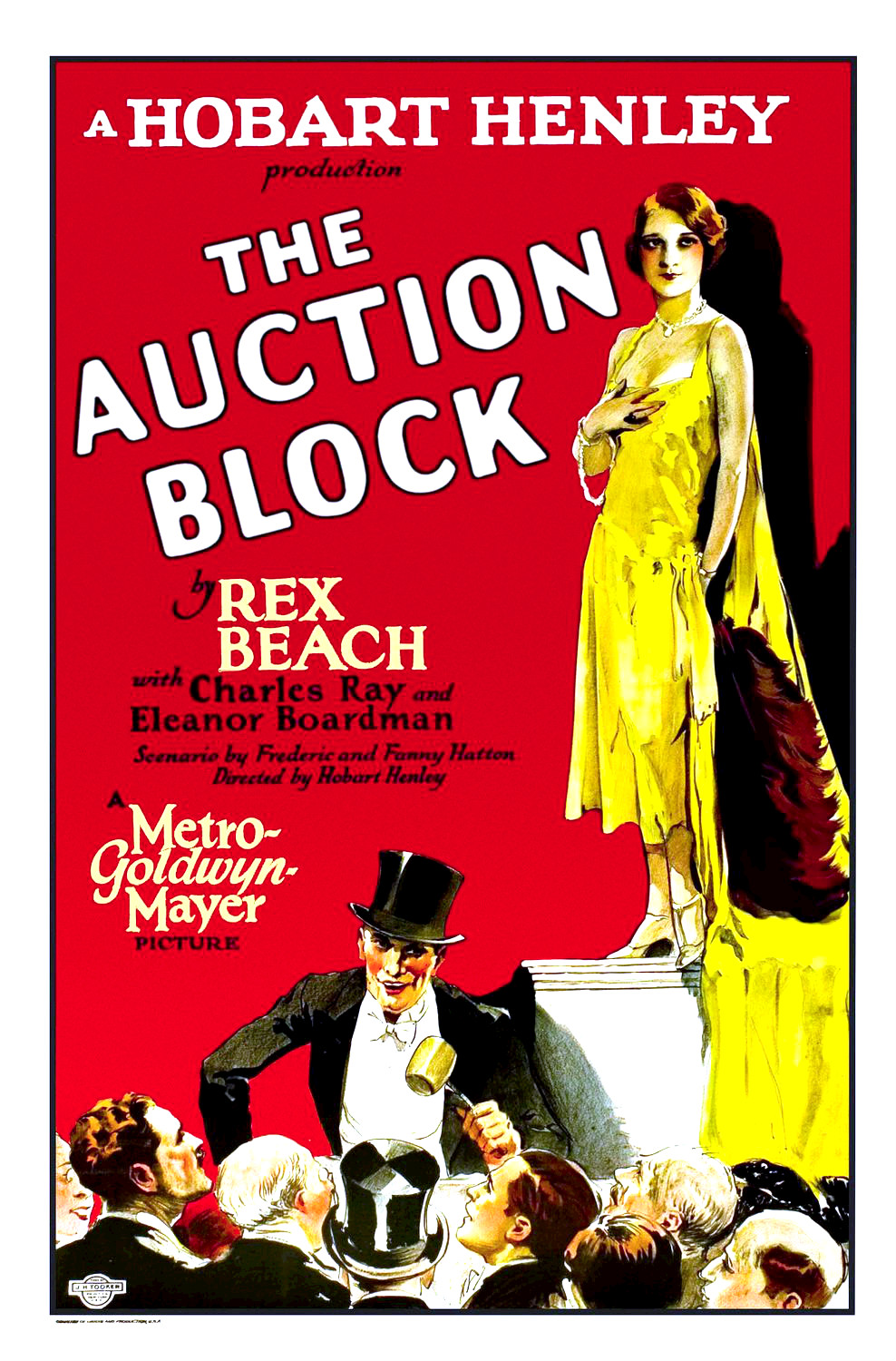
- Directed by: Hobart Henley
- Written by: Fanny Hatton; Frederic Hatton
- Based on: The Auction Block: A Novel of New York Life by Rex Beach
- Starring: Charles Ray; Eleanor Boardman; Sally O'Neil
- Cinematography: John Arnold, (Italian)
- Distributed by: Metro-Goldwyn-Mayer
- Release date: February 1, 1926
- Running time: 70 minutes
- Country: United States
- Language: Silent (English intertitles)

The Auction Block is a 1926 American silent comedy film directed by Hobart Henley. The film stars Charles Ray and Eleanor Boardman. It is written by Fanny and Frederic Hatton and is based on the novel of the same name by Rex Beach.

The film is a remake of the 1917 film of the same name, released by Goldwyn production starring Rubye De Remer and Tom Powers.

== Plot ==
As described in a film magazine review, Bob Wharton, spendthrift son of a millionaire, weds beauty contest winner Lory Knight. She repents her marriage to a man who has never worked, abandons Bob, and goes home to Palmdale, South Carolina, where she is wooed by Carter Lane. Bob arrives in town and goes to work in a shoe store and scores a big hit as a salesman. He is vamped by Bernice, the sister of Carter, who compromises him. The Lane family swears that he must marry Bernice or die. However, Bernice confesses her trick, allowing Bob to escape the family. Bob gets his opportunity to win his wife back at a charity auction, and Bob and Lory are reunited.

== Cast ==
- Charles Ray as Bob Wharton
- Eleanor Boardman as Lorelei Knight
- Sally O'Neil as Bernice Lane
- Donald Reed as Carter Lane (credited as Ernest Gillen)
- Charles Clary as Homer Lane
- David Torrence as Robert Wharton Sr
- James Corrigan as Mr. Knight
- Forrest Seabury as Edward Blake
- Ned Sparks as Nat Saluson

== Preservation ==
The Auction Block is considered to be a lost film.
