= The Crimson Stain Mystery =

1916 film

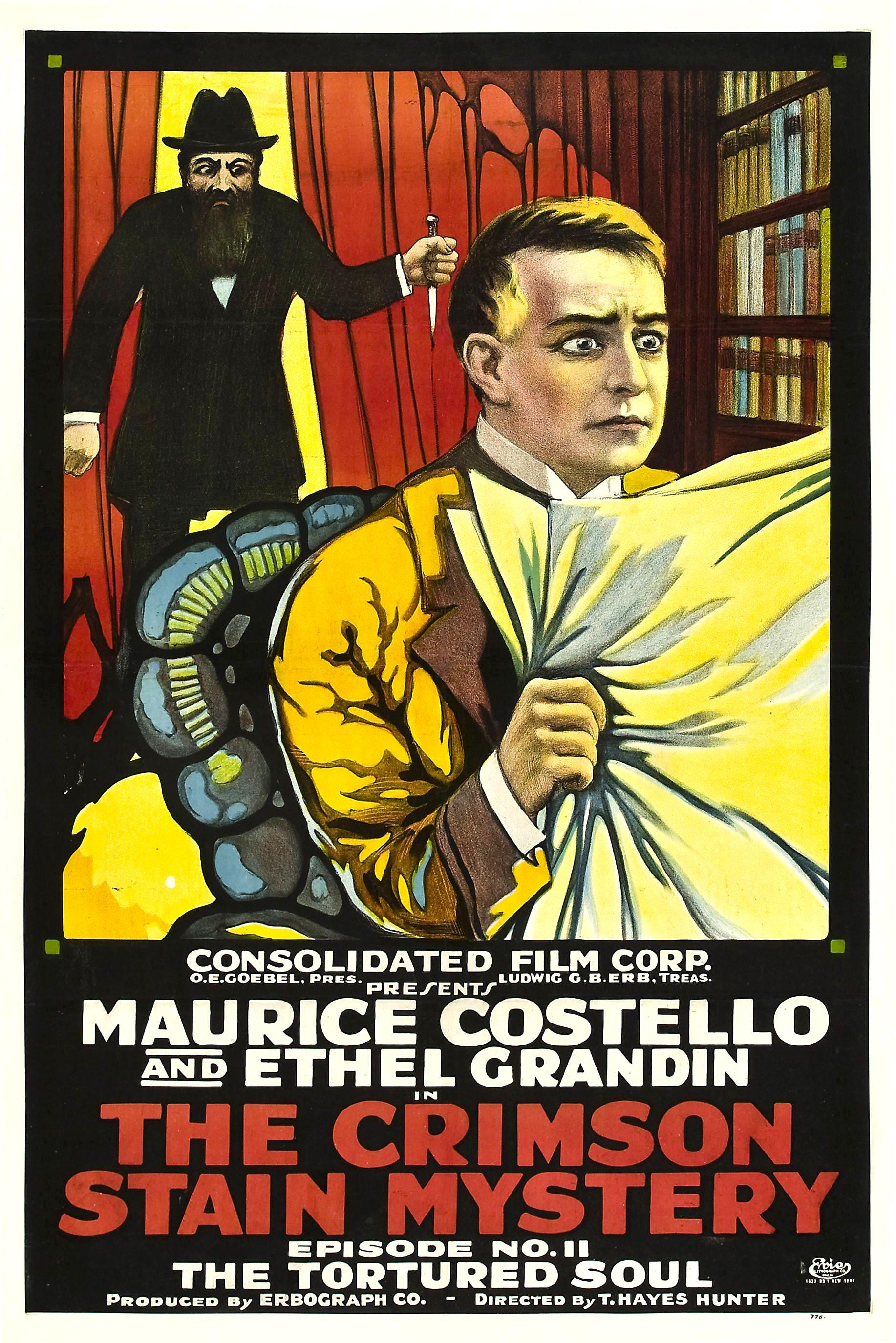
- Film poster; chapter #11
- Directed by: T. Hayes Hunter
- Written by: Albert Payson Terhune and Doty Hobart
- Starring: Maurice Costello; Ethel Grandin
- Distributed by: Metro Pictures
- Release date: August 21, 1916
- Running time: 16 episodes
- Country: United States
- Language: Silent with English intertitles

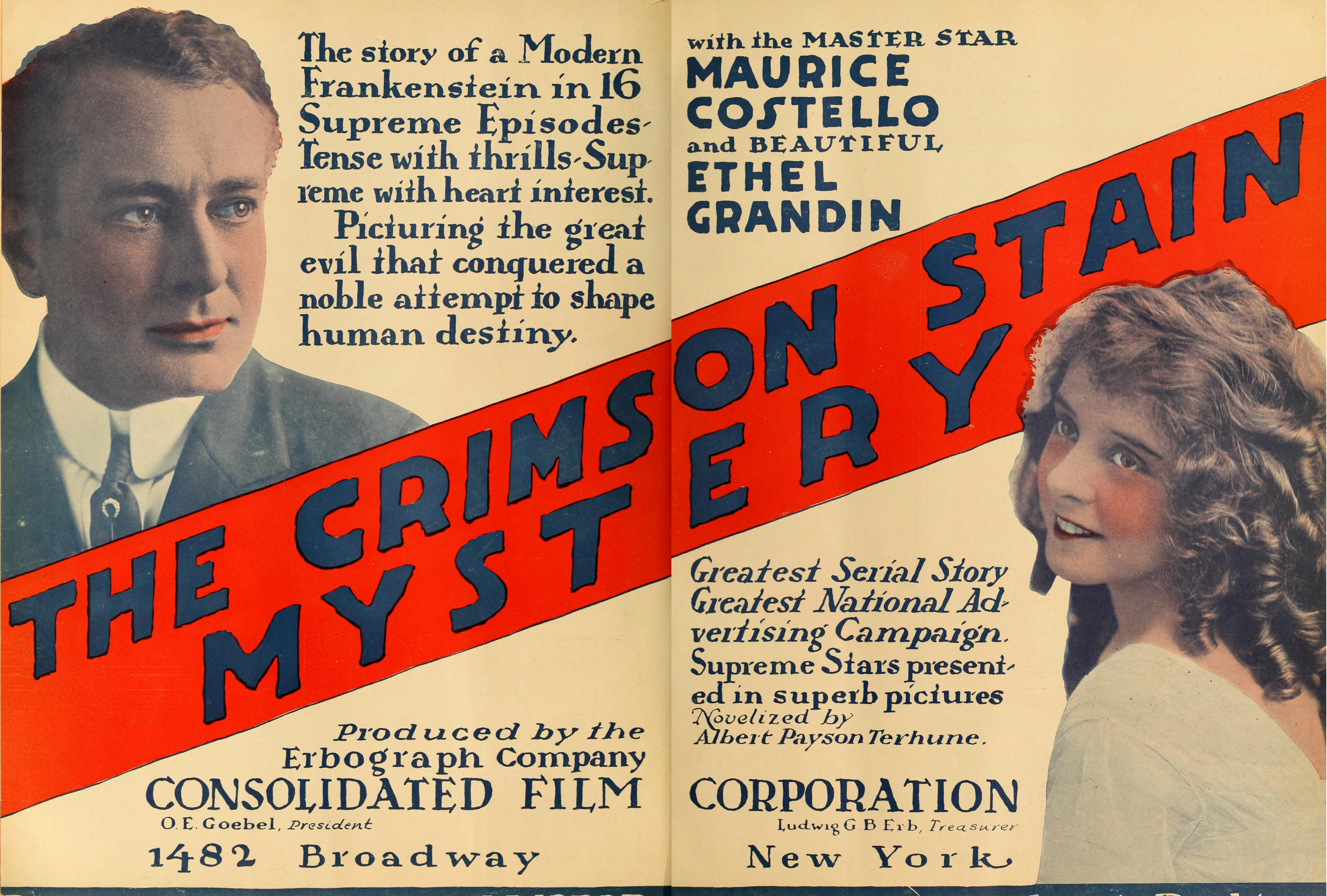
Advertisement (1916)

The Crimson Stain Mystery is a 1916 American horror film serial directed by T. Hayes Hunter. 11 reels were found in the Dawson Film Find in 1978.

== Plot ==
In this serial, Dr. Burton Montrose, a scientist, has developed a formula which he believes will make ordinary people into geniuses. He tests the drug on four subjects and, to his horror, finds that it turns them into compulsive criminals. The resulting band of thieves and murderers is led by the fiendish Pierre La Rue, known as the Crimson Stain for his luminous, red-rimmed eyes. He and his gang terrorize New York City, selecting wealthy victims as targets. They are pursued by Harold Stanley, editor of the Examiner newspaper, who has vowed vengeance for his father's murder. Aiding Stanley are his friend, Robert Clayton, his sweetheart, Dr. Montrose's daughter Florence, and a detective, Layton Parrish. Neither Florence nor anyone else knows the mysterious Crimson Stain to be none other than the doctor himself, driven insane by his own experiments.

The serial was restored by Eric Stedman of the Serial Squadron in 2023, accompanied by the first book publication of the 1916 newspaper novelization.

== Cast ==
- Maurice Costello as Harold Stanley
- Ethel Grandin as Florence Montrose
- Thomas J. McGrane as Dr. Burton Montrose
- Olga Olonova as Vanya Tosca
- John Milton as Layton Parrish
- N.J. Thompson as Jim Tanner
- Eugene Strong as Robert Clayton
- ? as Pierre LaRue

== Chapter titles ==
1. The Brand of Satan
2. In The Demon's Spell
3. The Broken Spell
4. The Mysterious Disappearance
5. The Figure In Black
6. The Phantom Image
7. The Devil's Symphony
8. In The Shadow of Death
9. The Haunting Spectre
10. The Infernal Fiend
11. The Tortured Soul
12. The Restless Spirit
13. Despoiling Brutes
14. The Bloodhound
15. The Human Tiger
16. The Unmasking

== See also ==
- List of American films of 1916
- List of film serials
- List of film serials by studio
