= Life's Greatest Problem =

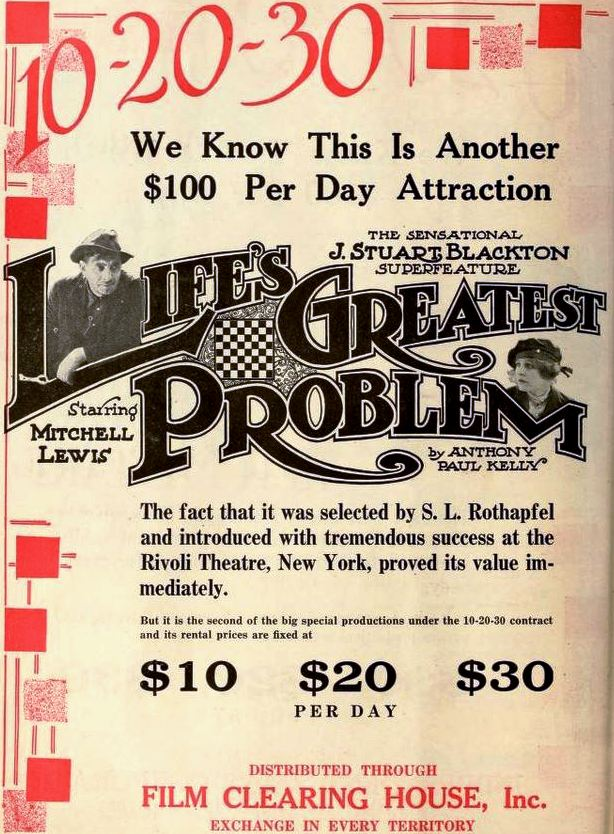
- Advertisement for film
- Directed by: J. Stuart Blackton
- Written by: Anthony Paul Kelly (story, scenario)
- Produced by: J. Stuart Blackton
- Starring: Mitchell Lewis; Rubye De Remer
- Cinematography: Otto Brautigan (some sources credit George Brauitgan)
- Production company: J. Stuart Blackton Feature Pictures
- Distributed by: Independent Sales Corporation
- Release date: November 3, 1918
- Running time: 6 reels
- Country: United States
- Language: Silent (English intertitles)

Life's Greatest Problem is a 1918 American silent war drama film directed and produced by J. Stuart Blackton.

The film exists today, preserved in the Library of Congress collection.

== Cast ==
- Mitchell Lewis as Big Steve Reardon
- Rubye De Remer as Alice Webster
- Gus Alexander as Little Lefty
- Ida Darling as Mrs. Craig
- Helen Ferguson as Miriam Craig
- John P. Wade as John Craig
- Eugene Strong as Dick Craig
- John Goldsworthy as Frank Craig
- John W. Martin as Shipyard Superintendent
- Sidney D'Albrook as An Agitator
- Bernard Randall as Craig's Secretary
- Aubrey Beattie as Wilkins

== Production ==
Filming began under the working title Safe for Democracy.
