= Luxury (film) =

1921 American silent film

- Directed by: Marcel Perez
- Written by: Marcel Perez
- Starring: Rubye De Remer; Walter Miller; Fred Kalgren
- Production company: Lyric Films
- Distributed by: Arrow Film Corporation
- Release date: January 1921
- Running time: 50 minutes
- Country: United States
- Languages: Silent; English intertitles

Luxury is a 1921 American silent drama film directed by Marcel Perez and starring Rubye De Remer, Walter Miller and Fred Kalgren.

== Cast ==
- Rubye De Remer as Blanche Young
- Walter Miller as Harry Morton
- Fred Kalgren as Joseph Burns
- Henry W. Pemberton as John Morton, Harry's stepbrother
- Grace Parker as Morton's Wife
- Rose Mintz as Olga Pompom
- Tom Magrane as Detective Healy

== Preservation ==
Luxury is currently presumed lost. In February of 2021, the film was cited by the National Film Preservation Board on their Lost U.S. Silent Feature Films list.

== Bibliography ==
- Armitage, John. Luxury and Visual Culture. Bloomsbury Publishing, 2019.
- Munden, Kenneth White. The American Film Institute Catalog of Motion Pictures Produced in the United States, Part 1. University of California Press, 1997.
