= Bungles =

- Directed by: Marcel Perez; Oliver Hardy
- Produced by: Louis Burstein
- Starring: Marcel Perez; Elsie MacLeod; Oliver Hardy
- Release date: 1916
- Country: United States
- Languages: Silent film English intertitles

Bungles is a series of four American black-and-white short silent comedy films produced by Louis Burstein for Jacksonville's Vim Comedy Company in 1916. While the series featured Oliver Hardy, Marcel Perez (sometimes referred to as Fernandez Perez) acted in the leading role. Perez played Bungles, billed on his debut in February as "the leading and most popular comedian in Europe". Perez also directed the four films. Elsie MacLeod was the only other credited actor in the series.

== Films ==
=== Bungles' Rainy Day ===
Bungles' Rainy Day was released on February 10, 1916.

=== Bungles Enforces the Law ===
Bungles Enforces the Law was released on February 24, 1916.

=== Bungles' Elopement ===
Bungles' Elopement was released on March 9, 1916.

=== Bungles Lands a Job ===
Bungles Lands a Job was released on March 23, 1916.

== Cast ==
- Marcel Perez as Bungles (credited as Fernandea Perez)
- Elsie MacLeod
- Oliver Hardy (credited as Babe Hardy)

== See also ==
- List of American films of 1916
