= The Way Women Love =

1920 film

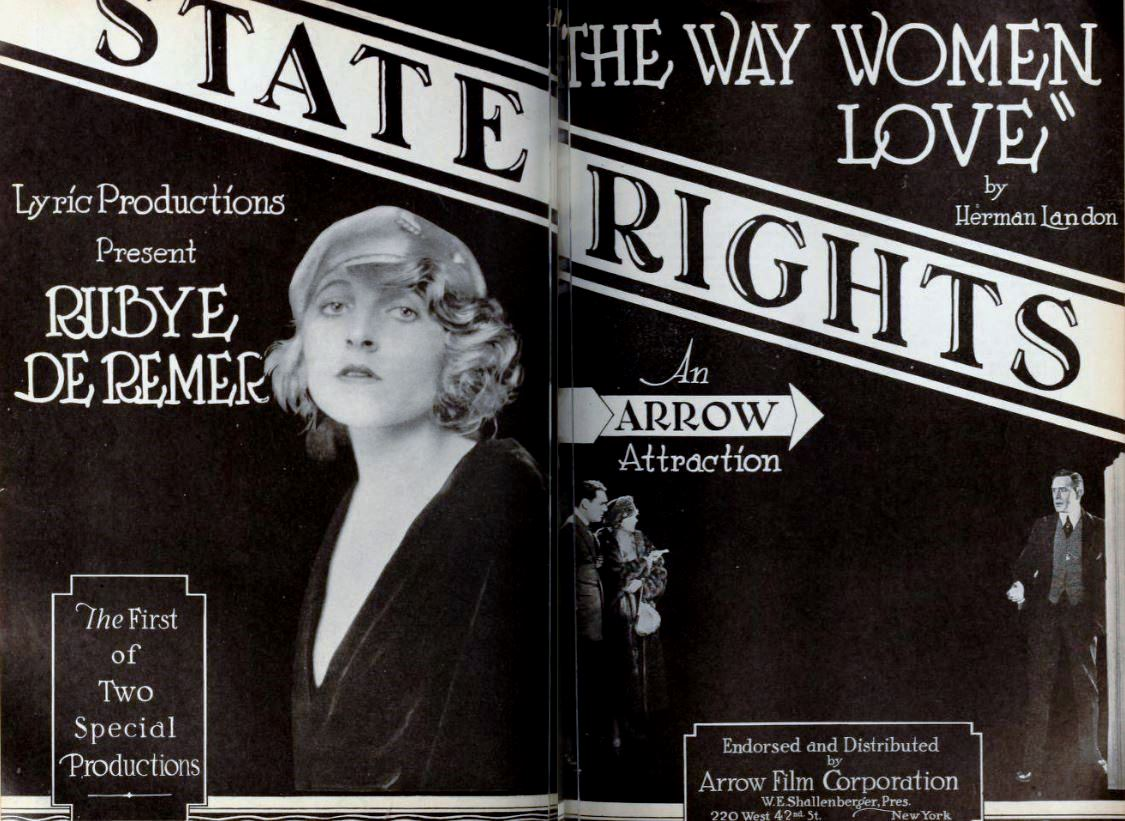
- Directed by: Marcel Perez
- Written by: Marcel Perez
- Based on: Behind the Green Portieres by Herman Landon
- Produced by: William Steiner
- Starring: Rubye De Remer; Walter Miller; Tom Magrane
- Cinematography: William S. Cooper
- Production company: Lyric Films
- Distributed by: Arrow Film Corporation
- Release date: December 15, 1920
- Running time: 50 minutes
- Country: United States
- Languages: Silent; English intertitles

The Way Women Love is a 1920 American silent mystery film directed by Marcel Perez and starring Rubye De Remer, Walter Miller and Tom Magrane.

== Cast ==
- Rubye De Remer as Judith Reytnard
- Walter Miller as Ralph Barr
- Tom Magrane as Schedd
- Henry W. Pemberton as Trent
- Edward Elkas as The Butler
- Walter Greene as A Detective

== Bibliography ==
- Munden, Kenneth White. The American Film Institute Catalog of Motion Pictures Produced in the United States, Part 1. University of California Press, 1997.
- Wlaschin, Ken. Silent Mystery and Detective Movies: A Comprehensive Filmography. McFarland, 2009.
