= Elsie MacLeod =

American film actress

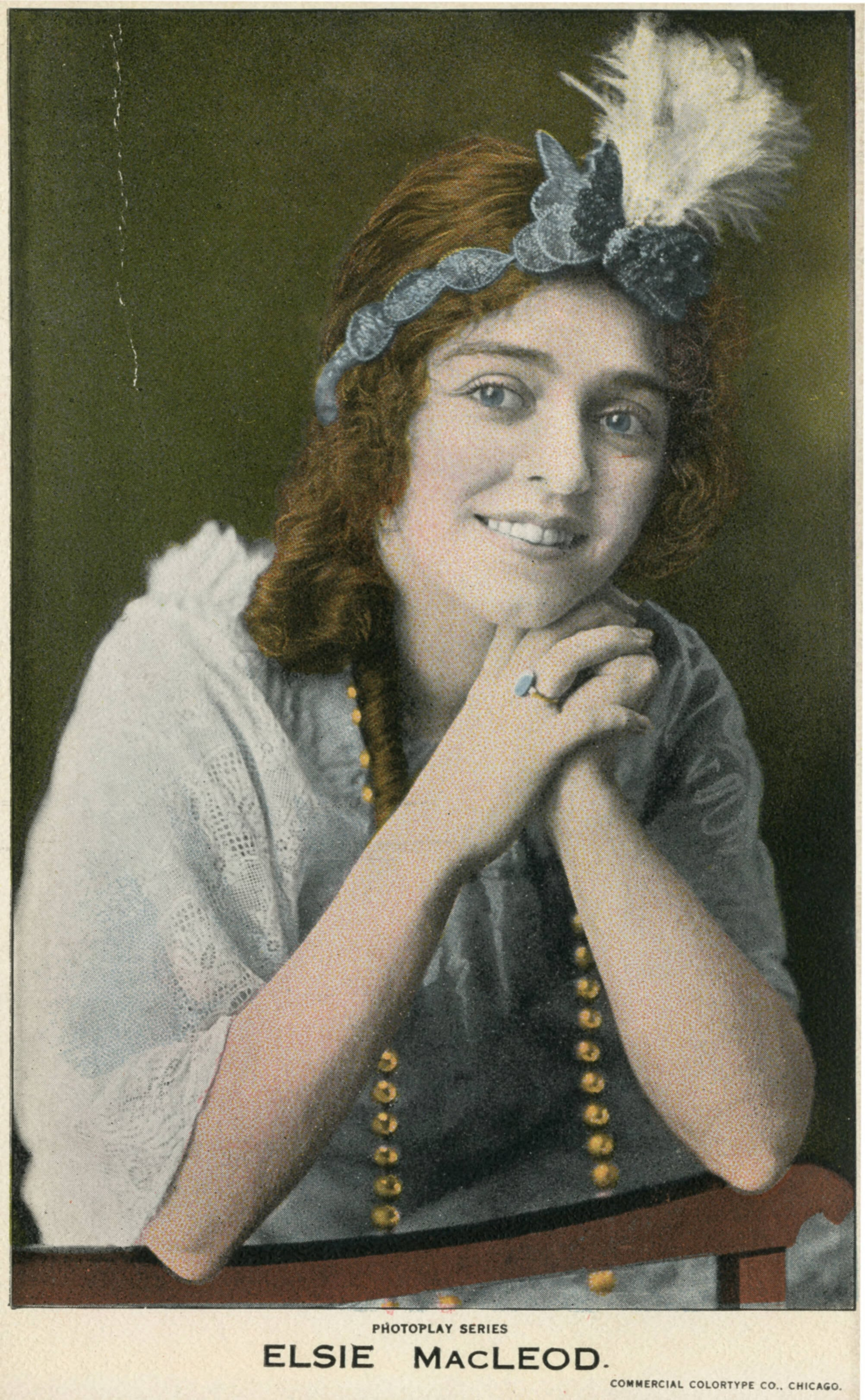
- Born: 1890 or 1894
- Other name: Elsie McLeod
- Occupation: Film actress

Elsie MacLeod (1890 or 1894 – date of death unknown), also noted as Elsie McLeod, was an American film actress who worked in Hollywood in the 1910s and early 1920s. She was primarily known for her starring roles in short Edison comedies, as a co-star in the Bungles Vim Comedy Company series, and for her roles in some of the Hazards of Helen film series episodes.

== Biography ==
According to contemporaneous reporters, Elsie began acting at the age of 5 before going to drama school and honing her craft. She then began performing in vaudeville. She signed with Edison around 1910 and began acting in the studio's short films.

She was in the Bungles film series.

== Selected filmography ==
- The Right Way (1921)
- The Gold Cure (1919)
- Opportunity (1918)
- Social Quicksands (1918)
- Madame Jealousy (1918)
- Aladdin's Other Lamp (1917)
- The Beautiful Lie (1917)
- Carmen (1915)
- The Hazards of Helen (1914)
- A Reluctant Cinderella (1913)
