= The Right Way (1921 film) =

1921 film

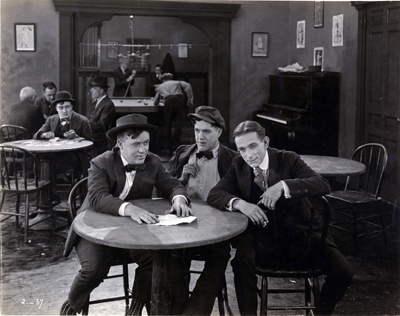
- Film still
- Directed by: Sidney Olcott
- Written by: Thomas Mott Osborne; Basil Dickey
- Based on: Thomas Mott Osborne (story)
- Produced by: Thomas Mott Osborne; Edouard MacManus
- Starring: Joseph Marquis; Edwards Davis
- Distributed by: Producers Security Corp
- Release date: February 28, 1921
- Running time: 7 reels
- Country: United States
- Language: Silent (English intertitles)

The Right Way is a 1921 American silent drama film distributed by Producers Security. It was directed by Sidney Olcott and starred Joseph Marquis and Edwards Davis. It was sponsored by Thomas Mott Osborne, former warden in Sing Sing prison and a leading advocate in America for prison reform and defender of the Mutual League.

== Plot ==
As described in a film magazine, a rich boy (Marquis) follows the path of gilded vice and on the day of his marriage to his sweetheart (Osborne), he uses his skill as a copyist and forges his father's name to obtain funds to satisfy the demands of a woman of the underworld. With its inevitable discovery, his Spartan father (Davis) allows the law to take its course and the rich boy is sent to prison. There he meets the poor boy (D'Albrook) serving time for burglary, and the two spend time under traditional prison system solitary confinement, ball and chain, and lockstep. The poor boy is released when his sentence expires, but is soon returned after a new crime. In the meantime a new warden (Brooks) has introduced reforms promoted by Osborne. With the establishment of an honor system and other changes, the two boys are soon transferred from sullen convicts to workers waiting for the expiration of their sentences. The two boys learn that a man is to be executed for a crime of which he is innocent, so they escape from prison, capture the Chinaman who committed the murder, and bring him to the prison. However, they are too late and the man was executed minutes prior to their arrival. At the end of their sentences, the two boys return to their mothers and sweethearts.

== Cast ==
- Joseph Marquis as the rich boy
- Sidney D'Albrook as the poor boy
- Edwards Davis as the rich boy's father
- Helen Lindroth as the rich boy's mother
- Vivienne Osborne as the rich boy's sweetheart
- Anniez Ecleston as the poor boy's mother
- Helen Ferguson as the poor boy's sweetheart
- Elsie MacLeod as the poor boy's sister
- Tammany Young as the smiler
- Thomas Brooks as the new warden

== Production notes ==
Working title of the film was The Gray Brother. Sidney Olcott was a member of Mutual league for prisoners.
