= Unconquered Woman =

1922 American silent drama film

- Directed by: Marcel Perez
- Written by: John B. Clymer
- Starring: Rubye De Remer; Walter Miller; Fred C. Jones
- Cinematography: William S. Cooper
- Production company: Pasha Film Corporation
- Distributed by: Lee-Bradford Corporation
- Release date: May 1922
- Running time: 50 minutes
- Country: United States
- Languages: Silent; English intertitles

Unconquered Woman is a 1922 American silent drama film directed by Marcel Perez and starring Rubye De Remer, Walter Miller and Fred C. Jones.

== Cast ==
- Rubye De Remer as Helen Chapelle
- Walter Miller as Bruce Devereux
- Fred C. Jones as Serge Ronoff
- Frankie Mann as Millicent
- Nick Thompson as Antonio

== Bibliography ==
- Nash, Jay Robert. The Motion Picture Guide 1988 Annual. Cinebooks, 1997.
