= Eugene Strong =

American actor (1893–1962)

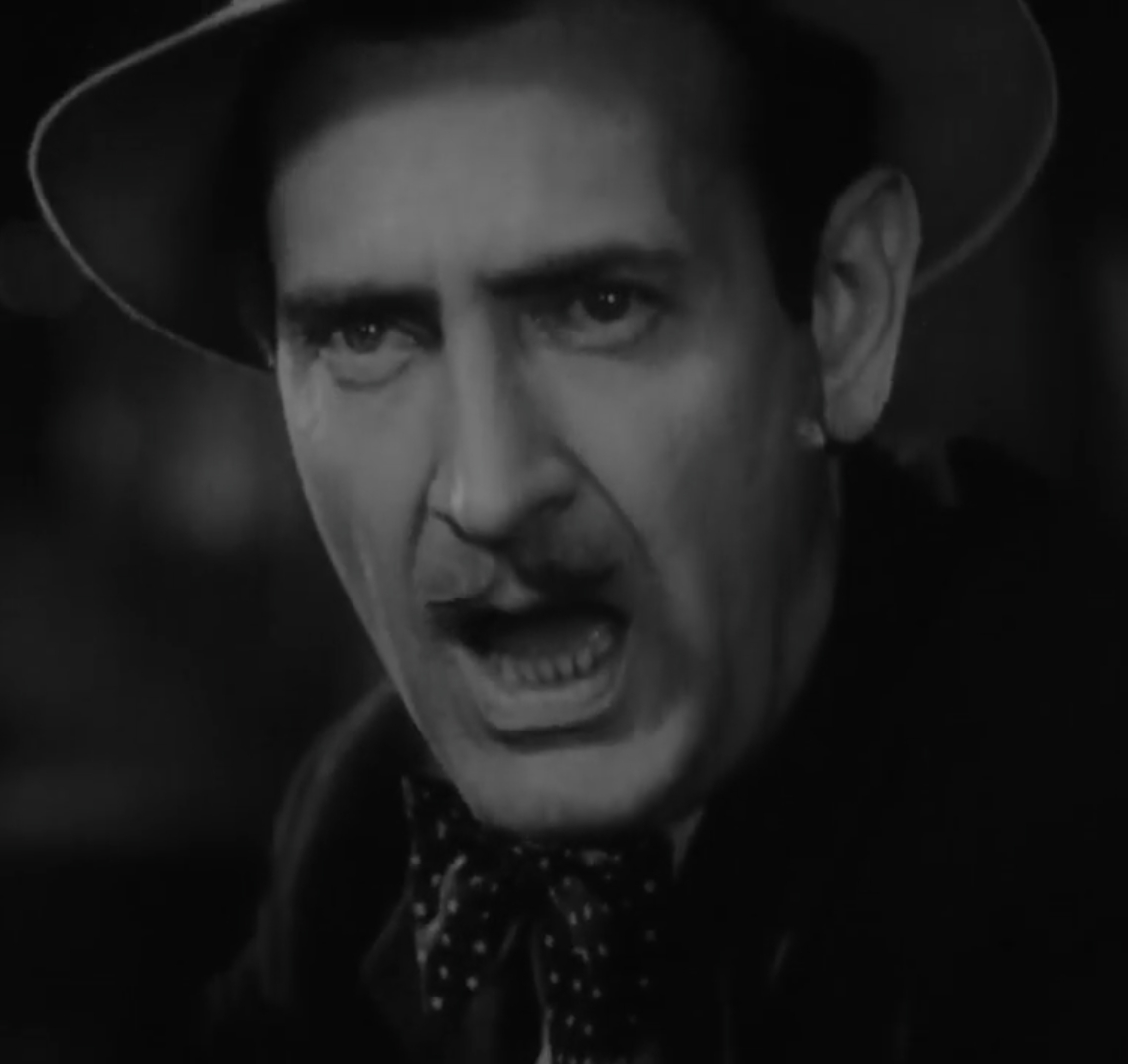
- Strong in The Front Page (1931)
- Born: August 9, 1893; Wisconsin, U.S.
- Died: June 25, 1962 (aged 68); Los Angeles, California, U.S.
- Resting place: Hollywood Forever Cemetery
- Occupation: Actor
- Years active: 1916–1938
- Spouses: Gladys Webster (div. 1919) Maryland Morne (m. 1934, died)

Eugene Strong (August 9, 1893 – June 25, 1962) was an American film actor and vaudevillian.

== Career ==
Eugene Strong oscillated between stage and film work throughout his acting career. He played the lead role in the stage production of The Virginian for two years. He was working in vaudeville in 1915.

Strong's first film was The Crimson Stain Mystery (1916); he received positive notice for his role as a man seduced by a vampire.

Strong returned to vaudeville in the 1920s. Strong worked with Valeska Surrat and supported Surrat in a lawsuit brought against her by Walter Percival in 1920. He was part of the vaudeville act Mann and Strong, with singer Hazel Mann. A Variety review of the play Garage Love states, "Strong, as always, is the personified matinee hero who gets the flappers on sight... Strong is a romantic 'hero' who has few equals. With any kind of luck he should be a 'name' in the native legitimate drama. He has proven it. Even in vaudeville he has done worth-while and outstanding things". A 1925 Billboard review of the act at The Palace Theatre in Cincinnati noted, "Eugene Strong has a likable easy-going manner that does much to put the act over."

He was signed to a five-year motion picture contract with Edward Small in 1926. One of his final films as an actor was The Front Page (1931).

== Personal life ==
Strong's marriage to Gladys Webster ended in divorce in 1919 on the grounds of his adultery.

Strong was married to Maryland Morne, an actress, from December 1934 until her death in 1935.

== Death ==
On June 25, 1962, Strong died in Los Angeles, California, aged 68. He was buried in Abbey of the Psalms of Hollywood.

== Partial filmography ==
=== As actor ===
- The Crimson Stain Mystery (1916), a serial, as Robert Clayton
- Infidelity (1917) as Ford Maillard
- In the Hands of the Law (1917)
- The Trail of the Shadow (1917) as Henry Hilliard
- Her Mistake (1918) as Ralph Van Cort
- The Border Legion (1918) as Jim Cleve
- Life's Greatest Problem (1918) as Dick Craig
- The Divorcee (1919) as Young Lord Mereston
- A Stitch in Time (1919) as Worthington Bryce
- The Vengeance of Durand (1919) as Captain St. Croix Trouvier
- His Temporary Wife (1920) as Arthur Eliot
- Miss 139 (1921) as Capt. Marlowe
- Damaged Hearts (1924) as David
- The Better Way (1926) as The Boss
- Not for Publication (1927) as Eli Barker
- The Drop Kick (1927) as Brad Hathaway
- Web of Fate (1927) as Don Eddington
- The Warning (1927) as No. 24
- Coney Island (1928) as Tammany Burke
- Crooks Can't Win (1928) as Alfred Dayton Jr
- The Front Page (1931) as Endicott (as Gene Strong)
- Men of America (1932) as Bugs – Henchman
- Let 'em Have It (1935) as 'Dude'

=== Production ===
- Hopalong Cassidy Returns (1936) – Producer
- Trail Dust (1936) – Producer
- Borderland (1937) – Producer
- Ramrod (1947) (as Gene Strong) – Producer
- The Barrier (1937) – Location manager
- Partners of the Plains (1938) – Production manager
