= Fires of Faith =

1919 film by Edward José

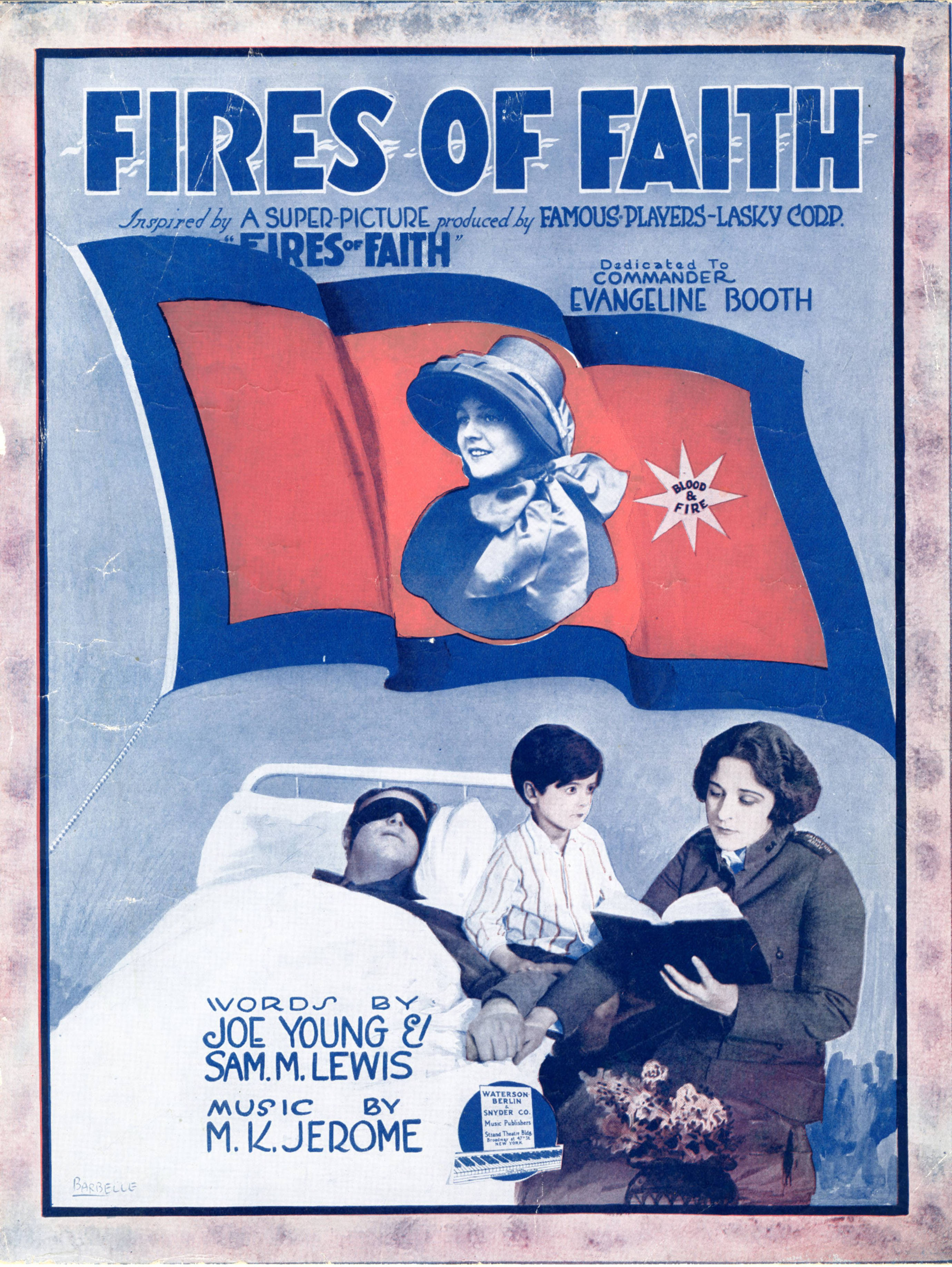
- Film still on sheet music cover
- Directed by: Edward José
- Screenplay by: Beulah Marie Dix; Charles E. Whittaker
- Produced by: Jesse L. Lasky
- Starring: Catherine Calvert; Eugene O'Brien; Rubye De Remer; Helen Dunbar; Theodore Roberts; Charles Ogle; Clarence Geldart
- Cinematography: Charles Edgar Schoenbaum; Alvin Wyckoff; Hal Young
- Production company: Famous Players–Lasky Corporation
- Distributed by: Paramount Pictures
- Release date: August 3, 1919
- Running time: 60 minutes
- Country: United States
- Language: Silent (English intertitles)

Fires of Faith is a 1919 American silent drama film directed by Edward José and written by Beulah Marie Dix and Charles E. Whittaker. The film stars Catherine Calvert, Eugene O'Brien, Rubye De Remer, Helen Dunbar, Theodore Roberts, Charles Ogle, and Clarence Geldart. The film with a plot concerning The Salvation Army and World War I was released on August 3, 1919, by Paramount Pictures.

== Plot ==
As described in a film magazine, Elizabeth Blake, who has been reared in the country since she was a foundling, is lured to her ruin by an unscrupulous landlord's agent. She runs away to the city and, after many adventures, is rescued by The Salvation Army and made a member of their order. When her county lover Luke finds her, she is about to embark for France, so he enlists in the army in the hope of meeting her in Europe. Harry Hammond, a son of wealth who has scorned The Salvation Army, is shanghaied and taken to London, where a representative of the order persuades him to enlist in the aviation corps. His fiancé Agnes Traverse, learning of his whereabouts, also dons the scarlet ribboned bonnet and arrives in France. Harry is wounded and Elizabeth, who has learned to love him, remains behind with him when the Allies retreat. Luke arrives and casts his lot with them, and the three hide in the cellar of a deserted chateau taken by the Germans. They resist capture until rescued by the American forces. A military wedding ceremony unites Harry and Agnes and Luke and Elizabeth.

== Cast ==
- Catherine Calvert as Elizabeth Blake
- Eugene O'Brien as Harry Hammond
- Rubye De Remer as Agnes Traverse
- Helen Dunbar as Mrs. Traverse
- Theodore Roberts as Salvationist
- Charles Ogle as William Booth
- Clarence Geldart as Railton
- James Neill as Booth's Secretary
- Edythe Chapman as Mrs. Booth
- Pat Moore as Jules, Pierre's Grandson
- Fred Huntley as Joe Lee
- Lucille Ward as Mrs. Lee
- Mowbray Berkeley as Mark Southard
- Robert Anderson as Luke Barlow
- Evangeline Booth as herself
