= His Temporary Wife =

1920 film by Joseph Levering

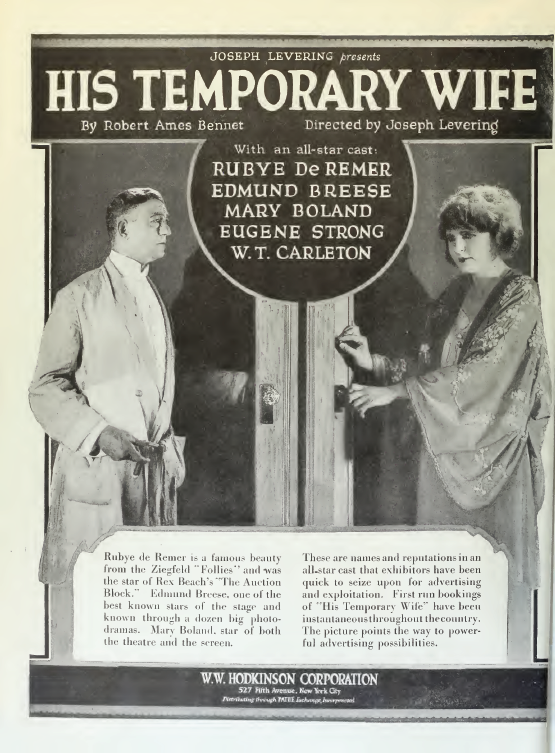
- Advertisement
- Directed by: Joseph Levering
- Based on: short story, His Temporary Wife, by Robert Ames Bennet
- Produced by: Joseph Levering
- Starring: Rubye De Remer; Edmund Breese; Mary Boland
- Cinematography: Walter Pritchard
- Production company: Joseph Levering Productions
- Distributed by: W. W. Hodkinson Corporation
- Release date: February 1920
- Running time: 6 reels
- Country: United States
- Language: Silent (English intertitles)

His Temporary Wife is a lost 1920 American silent comedy film directed by Joseph Levering. It was released by W. W. Hodkinson.

== Plot ==
As described in a film magazine, Annabelle Rose is employed as a nurse by aged millionaire Howard Eliot, who desires beauty in the person who cares for him. He grows fond of her and asks her to marry him so that he can leave his millions to her instead of his son Arthur. She refuses, so he makes a new will and places an envelope in her hands that she is to open sixty days after his death. Howard dies and Annabelle is considered responsible. She finds it impossible to obtain work and after suffering and close to starvation she answers an advertisement for a temporary wife. It turns out that it was placed by Arthur who, by the terms of his father's will, must marry some other woman than Verna Devore, a fortune seeker whom his father opposed. Annabelle consents to the temporary arrangement after opening the letter after sixty days and discovering that she has inherited the Eliot fortune. Through the influence of Judge Laton, Verna is cast aside and Arthur's temporary wife becomes permanent.

== Cast ==
- Rubye De Remer as Annabelle Rose
- Edmund Breese as Judge Laton
- Eugene Strong as Arthur Eliot
- Mary Boland as Verna Devore
- William T. Carleton as Howard Eliot (credited as W. T. Carleton)
- Armand Cortes as Leonard Devore
