= The Auction Block (1917 film) =

1917 film

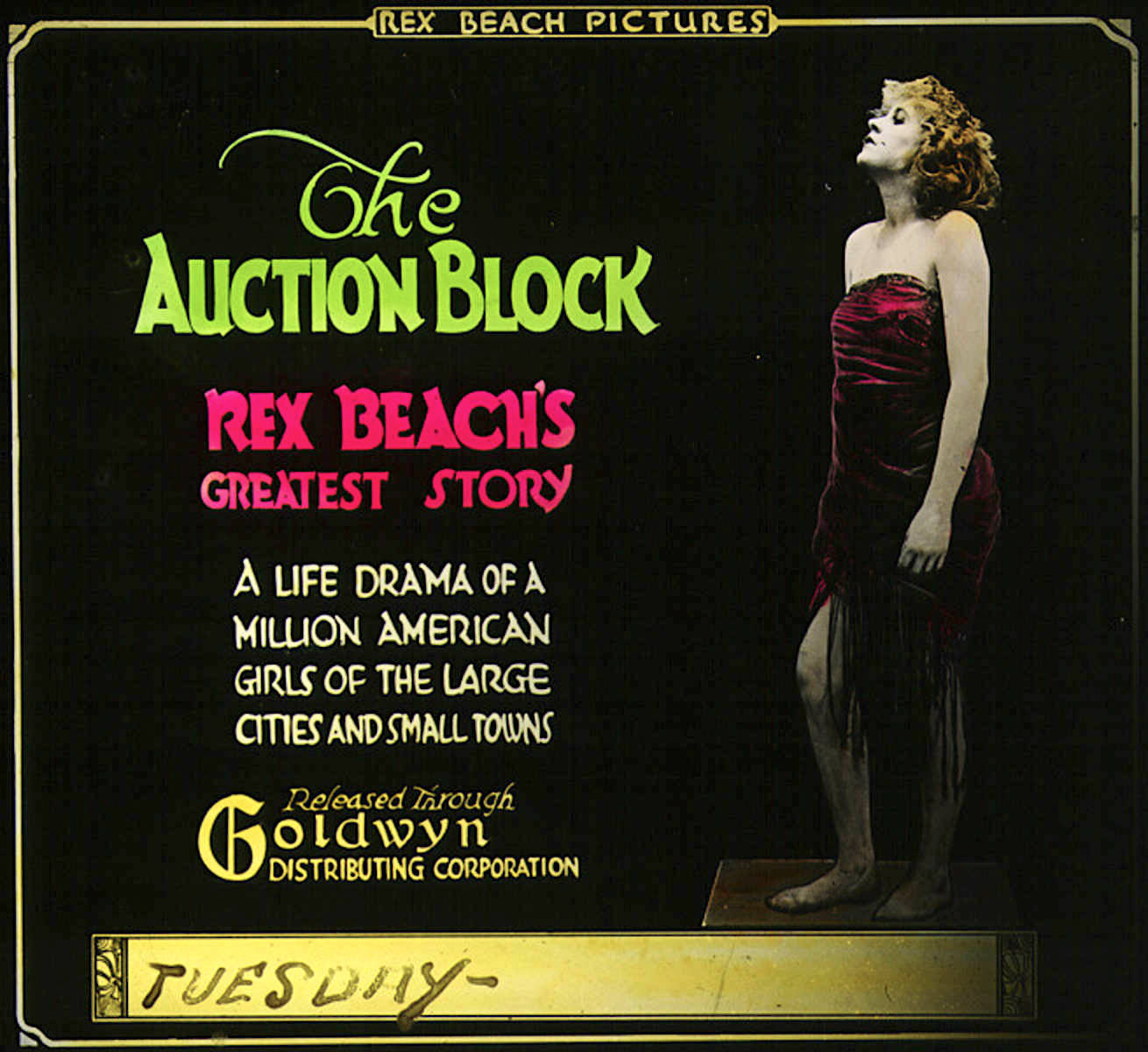
- Lantern slide
- Directed by: Laurence Trimble
- Written by: Gil Spear (scenario)
- Based on: The Auction Block by Rex Beach
- Produced by: Rex Beach
- Starring: Rubye De Remer
- Cinematography: David Calcagni
- Production company: Rex Beach Pictures Company
- Distributed by: Goldwyn Pictures
- Release date: December 2, 1917
- Running time: 70 minutes
- Country: United States
- Language: Silent (English intertitles)

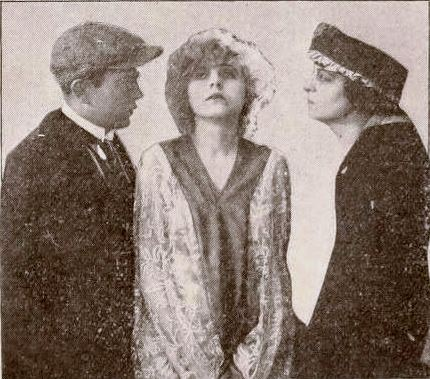
Still with Tom Powers, Rubye De Remer, and Florence Deshon

The Auction Block is a lost 1917 American silent drama film directed by Laurence Trimble and starring Rubye De Remer. The film was produced by Rex Beach, upon whose novel, The Auction Block, the film is based. The film was remade as a comedy in 1926 by Metro-Goldwyn-Mayer starring Charles Ray and Eleanor Boardman.

== Plot ==
As described in a film magazine, The parents of Lorelei Knight are anxious to make a small fortune off of her beauty. They send her to New York to become a member of a "girl show". Bob Wharton, the dissolute son of a millionaire, falls in love with the girl. When Lorelei learns that her father is ill and money is needed, she marries Bob although she does not love him. Bob's father cuts off his allowance and Bob is forced to go to work. The wholesomeness of Lorelei kindles a desire in Bob to become a better man. He is getting along well when Lorelei's worthless brother leads Bob back to his old life. Lorelei is about to leave him when she is persuaded by Adoree Demorest, known as the wickedest woman in New York, and Campbell Pope, a critic in love with Adoree, to stay. When Bob learns that he is going to be a father, he conquers his desire for drink. With the birth of their son, pleasant relations resume among Bob and Lorelei.

== Cast ==
- Rubye De Remer as Lorelei Knight
- Florence Deshon as Lilas Lynn
- Dorothy Wheeler as Mrs. Peter Knight
- Florence Johns as Adoree Demorest
- Tom Powers as Bob Wharton
- Walter Hitchcock as Jarvis Hammon
- Ned Burton as Hannibal Wharton
- Charles E. Graham as Max Melcher
- George Cooper as Jimmy Knight
- Alec B. Francis as John Merkle
- Francis Joyner as Campbell Pope
- Bernard Randall as Noble Bergman
- Peter Lang as Peter Knight

== Reception ==
Like many American films of the time, The Auction Block was subject to cuts by city and state film censorship boards. For example, the Chicago Board of Censors required, in Reel 1, a cut of a long gambling scene, the two intertitles "Since you want to go on the stage, Melcher will want to see more of you" and "True to Mercher's prediction, he did want to see more of Lilas", and all indications of the young woman posing including where she is shown undressing behind screens, her handing a man a kimono and his handing it back to her, view of nude painting in the background, and the incident of maid opening secret panel admitting man to buffet flat; Reel 2, two views of nude painting, the entire incident of second young woman posing before man, the intertitle "Animated by revenge, Lilas permitted Hammon to install her in the Elegancia Apartments", and man putting had suggestively on woman's bare shoulder; Reel 3, two views of man kissing woman on neck and the intertitle "Take him to Clover roadhouse" etc.; Reel 4, five intertitles "The little flashlight will cost you $20,000" etc., "Melcher accepted a check keeping the plate as security", "In the apartments below Lilas rejoices in Hammon's absence", "Here is hoping he stays away a month", and "Fill him up with booze and we will take him to New Jersey to get married", and closeup of roulette wheel; Reel 5, the three intertitles "Hammon returns unexpectedly", "Who has been here with her", and "You can't buy me off with a string of pearls", and the shooting of the man; the three intertitles "When you redeem yourself I'll be a real wife to you", "Tell him he better pay again or his baby will be born in jail", and "As the months roll by, Bob still lives apart from his wife"; Reel 7, passionate love scene between couple to where woman leaves man at door the first time, striking man with chair over his head, and policeman striking black man on head; and Reel 8, to flash the long gambling scene.

== Preservation ==
With no holdings located in archives, The Auction Block is considered a lost film.
