= For Freedom (1918 film) =

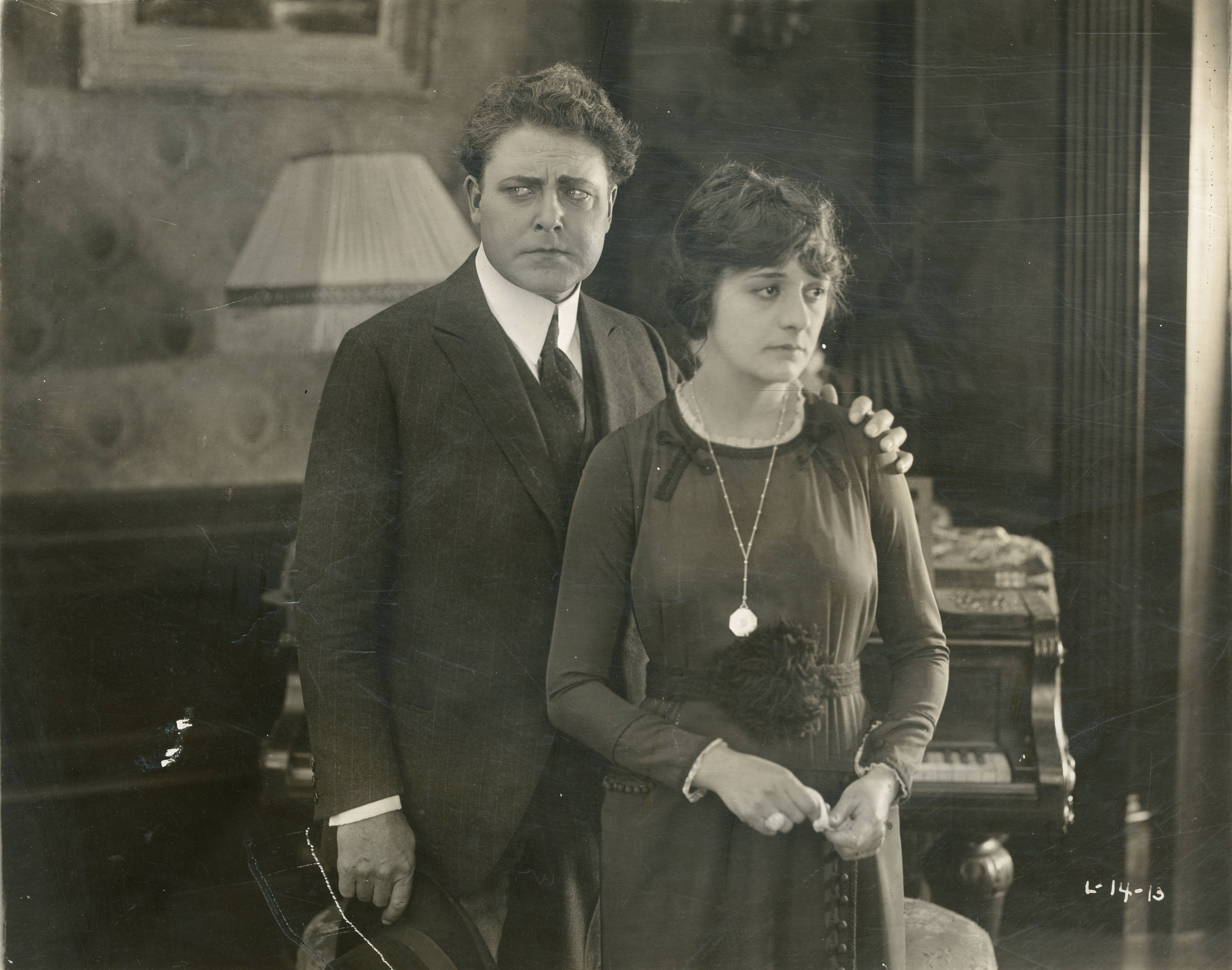
- Film still
- Directed by: Frank Lloyd
- Written by: E. Lloyd Sheldon; Florence Margolies
- Produced by: William Fox
- Starring: William Farnum; Coit Albertson; Rubye De Remer
- Cinematography: William C. Foster
- Production company: Fox Film
- Distributed by: Fox Film
- Release date: December 29, 1918
- Running time: 60 minutes
- Country: United States
- Language: Silent (English intertitles)

For Freedom is a 1918 American silent drama film directed by Frank Lloyd and starring William Farnum, Coit Albertson, and Rubye De Remer.

== Cast ==
- William Farnum as Robert Wayne
- Coit Albertson as Herbert Osborne
- Rubye De Remer as Mary Fenton
- Anna Lehr as Edith Osborne
- J. Herbert Frank as Howard Stratton
- G. Raymond Nye as Bill Harris
- John Slavin as The Weazel
- Marc B. Robbins as David Sterling

== Bibliography ==
- Solomon, Aubrey. The Fox Film Corporation, 1915-1935: A History and Filmography. McFarland, 2011.
