= Hamlet (1900 film) =

1900 short film by Clément Maurice

- Directed by: Clément Maurice
- Based on: Excerpt from Hamlet by William Shakespeare
- Produced by: Paul Decauville; Clément Maurice
- Starring: Sarah Bernhardt
- Release date: 1900
- Running time: 2 minutes
- Country: France
- Language: French (intertitles)

Hamlet, also known as Le Duel d'Hamlet, is a 1900 French film adaptation of an excerpt from the William Shakespeare play Hamlet. It is believed to have been the earliest film adaptation of the play, and starred actress Sarah Bernhardt in the lead role. It was directed by Clément Maurice.

The film is two minutes in length; it features the duel scene between Hamlet and Laertes (Act V).

Hamlet was one of the first films to employ the newly discovered art of pre-recording the actors' voices, then playing the recording simultaneous to the playing of the film. The film was synchronized to a wax cylinder recording, providing the sound, which is now lost.

Hamlet was shown for first time in The Exposition Universelle on October 1, 1900 in Paris, France.

== Cast ==
- Sarah Bernhardt as Hamlet
- Pierre Magnier as Laertes
- Suzanne Seylor as A page
