= Austin Leigh =

British actor

Austin Leigh (born 1860) was a British stage and film actor.

== Actor-manager ==
Anthony Austin-Leigh was born in north London in 1860, the son of a solicitor. He was educated at Bruce Castle School and attended King's College, London. A clerk in the Civil Service, he was an amateur actor in the 1880s. After some coaching from Mrs. Chippendale and Miss Glyn, he went for a few weeks to the School of Dramatic Art on Argyle Street that had opened in 1882.

Austin-Leigh's professional debut was at the original Theatre Royal, Windsor. He appeared in a theatrical directory listing in 1888, at an address on Highbury New Park, moving the following year to Belsize Park Gardens. In 1888 he married Emmie O'Reilly, also on the stage, with a similar background, coached by Mrs. Chippendale and Horace Wigan, and a student at the School of Dramatic Art. She had a long run at the Lyceum Theatre, London with Mary Anderson, and was a leading lady with Augustus Harris.

In 1909, Austin-Leigh was the subject of bankruptcy proceedings, as an actor and theatrical manager, living in Pimlico. His stage career continued until at least 1917, when he appeared in The Little Damozel at the Palace Pier, Brighton.

== Selected filmography ==
- Brigadier Gerard (1915)
- Beau Brocade (1916)
- The Temptress (1920)
- Desire (1920)
- Adventures of Captain Kettle (1922)
- Old Bill Through the Ages (1924)
- Bulldog Drummond's Third Round (1925)
