= Beau Brocade (film) =

1916 British film by Thomas Bentley

- Directed by: Thomas Bentley
- Based on: Beau Brocade by Emmuska Orczy
- Starring: Mercy Hatton; Charles Rock; Austin Leigh
- Release date: 1916
- Country: United Kingdom

Beau Brocade is a 1916 British silent adventure film directed by Thomas Bentley and starring Mercy Hatton, Charles Rock and Austin Leigh. In eighteenth century Britain a disgraced gentleman becomes a highwaymen. It is adapted from the 1907 novel Beau Brocade by Baroness Emmuska Orczy.

== Cast ==
- Mercy Hatton as Lady Patience
- Charles Rock as Sir Humphrey Challoner
- Austin Leigh as Jack Bathurst
- Cecil Mannering as Lord Stretton
- George Foley as John Stitch
- Cecil Morton York as Matterchip
- Frank Harris as Jock Miggs
- Harry Brayne as Duffy
- Kitty Arlington as Betty
