= Cyrano de Bergerac (1900 film) =

- Cyrano de Bergerac (1900)
- Directed by: Clément Maurice
- Based on: Cyrano de Bergerac; 1897 play by Edmond Rostand
- Produced by: Clément Maurice
- Starring: Benoît-Constant Coquelin
- Production company: Phono-Cinéma-Théâtre
- Release date: 1900
- Running time: 2 minutes
- Country: France
- Language: French

Cyrano de Bergerac is a 1900 French short drama film directed by Clément Maurice, featuring Benoit Constant Coquelin as Cyrano. It was shown at the 1900 Paris Universal Exposition. The film, tinted with color and synchronized to a wax cylinder recording, is thought to be the first film made with both color and sound.

== Plot summary ==
The film presents a portion of Act I of Rostand's Cyrano de Bergerac, where Cyrano fights a duel with a Vicomte while extemporizing a ballade. He wins the duel effortlessly.

== Cast ==
- Benoît-Constant Coquelin as Cyrano de Bergerac (as Coquelin ainé)
