= Clément Maurice =

Cyrano de Bergerac (1900)

Clément Maurice (March 22, 1853 – July 15, 1933) was a French photographer, film director, and producer.

== Career ==
First employed in the Lumière factories, where he entered in 1894, he became a portrait photographer in Paris, where he settled in Antoine Lumière's studio at 8 boulevard des Italiens, above the Robert-Houdin Theater, property of the future filmmaker Georges Méliès. This and that allow him to enter the world of cinematography.

From 1898 to 1906, he was the cameraman for surgeon Eugène Doyen for whom he filmed for educational purposes around sixty operations. He worked there with: Ambroise-François Parnaland (1854 - 1913), who founded in 1908 with Charles Jourjon (1876 - 1934) the Éclair Laboratories.

In 1899, the production company Association frères Lumière hired him as a cinematographer collaborator and technician for the shooting of the film Excursion automobile Paris-Meulan. Quickly, he started producing and directing feature films such as Le Duel d'Hamlet or Cyrano de Bergerac.

With Henri Lioret, he developed the Phono-Cinema-Theater, a pioneering system of sound cinema, presented at the Universal Exhibition of 1900.

== Filmography ==
Producer

- 1900: Le Duel d'Hamlet
- 1900: Jules Moy (Clément-Maurice Gratioulet)
- 1900: Little Tich et ses Big Boots (Clément-Maurice Gratioulet)
- 1900: Madame Sans-Gêne
- 1900: Mariette Sully (Clément-Maurice Gratioulet)
- 1900: Mily Mayer (Clément-Maurice Gratioulet)

Director

- 1900: Le Duel d'Hamlet
- 1900: Madame Sans-Gêne
- 1900: Roméo et Juliette
- 1900: Cyrano de Bergerac
- 1911: L'Inutile Sacrifice

Chief camera operator

- 1899: Excursion automobile Paris-Meulan produced by l'Association frères Lumière, opérateur
- 1912: La Dame aux camélias
