= Marcelo Pérez (footballer, born 1994) =

Chilean footballer (born 1994)

Personal information
- Full name: Marcelo Daniel Pérez Maldonado
- Date of birth: 24 June 1994 (age 32)
- Place of birth: Santiago, Chile
- Height: 1.63 m (5 ft 4 in)
- Position: Left-back

Youth career
- 2010–2014: Universidad Católica

Senior career*
Years	Team	Apps	(Gls)
2014–2015	Universidad Católica	0	(0)
2014–2015	→ Coquimbo Unido (loan)	11	(0)
2016	Lautaro de Buin		
2016–2018	Fernández Vial		
2018–2019	Independiente de Cauquenes	49	(6)
- * Club domestic league appearances and goals as of 22 November 2019

Marcelo Daniel Pérez Maldonado (born 24 June 1994) is a Chilean footballer who last played for Chilean Segunda División side Independiente de Cauquenes as a left-back.

== Career ==
Pérez made his debut at Universidad Católica playing against Audax Italiano in Estadio Bicentenario de La Florida in 2012. Later, on 7 August 2014, Pérez was loaned to Coquimbo Unido for a year.
