= Beau Brocade =

1907 novel by Baroness Orczy

- Author: Baroness Orczy
- Language: English
- Genre: Historical novel
- Publisher: Greening & Co
- Publication date: 1907
- Publication place: United Kingdom
- Media type: Print (hardback & paperback)
- Pages: 307 pp

Beau Brocade is a 1907 novel written by Baroness Orczy and was followed by the play of the same name in 1908. It was adapted as a silent film Beau Brocade in 1916. The Ballad of Beau Brocade was an 1892 poem by English Poet Henry Austin Dobson.

== Plot summary ==
After their recent defeat, the hamlets and villages of Derbyshire are no longer ringing with the shouts of Bonny Prince Charlie's Highland Brigade; instead, troops loyal to King George are looking for those accused of high treason and are offering a reward of twenty guineas for the death of any traitor or rebel.

Philip James Gascoyne, eleventh Earl of Stretton, is in hiding, in fear for his life after being wrongly accused by Sir Humphrey Challoner of being a traitor to the King.

For months, Philip had been a fugitive disguised in rough clothes and hiding, trusting no-one. But now, he has been given shelter and a cover by John Stitch, the local blacksmith, and is pretending to be Stitch’s nephew while trying to get a note to his sister, Lady Patience Gascoyne.

John Stich is also friends with the notorious Beau Brocade, a masked highwayman who roams the moors holding up coaches so he can steal from the rich and give to the poor. Beau Brocade is actually Captain Jack Bathurst of His Majesty's White Dragoons, a handsome but tragic figure on whose head the Government has put the price of a hundred guineas.

The blacksmith gets Beau Brocade to deliver a letter from Philip to his sister and a couple of days later she turns up at his forge in her coach. Reunited with his beloved sister, Philip gives Patience a packet of letters which prove his innocence and asks her to take them to London and clear his name.

Just as they are discussing when she can leave, they spot Sir Humphrey's coach in the distance, Philip goes back into hiding while Patience heads towards the inn in Aldwark village to get a couple of hours rest for herself and the horses before starting the journey to London.
