= The Hazards of Helen =

1914 American film serial

- The Hazards of Helen, episode # 44
- Directed by: J.P. McGowan; J. Gunnis Davis (billed as James Davis)
- Written by: W. Scott Darling (screenplay); John Russell Corvell (novel); Denman Thompson (play)
- Starring: Helen Holmes; Helen Gibson
- Distributed by: Kalem Company
- Release dates: November 14, 1914 (to); February 17, 1917
- Running time: 23.8 hours (altogether)

The Hazards of Helen is an American adventure film serial (or possibly a film series) of 119 twelve-minute episodes released over a span of slightly more than two years by the Kalem Company between November 14, 1914, and February 17, 1917. At 23.8 hours, it is one of the longest non-feature-length motion picture series ever filmed, and is believed to be the longest of the film serial format. Based on a novel by John Russell Corvell and the play by Denman Thompson, the series was adapted to the silent screen by W. Scott Darling.

Episodes 1-48 were directed by J.P. McGowan and the remainder by J. Gunnis Davis, who was credited as James Davis. Unlike the cliffhanger serials of the era, The Hazards of Helen is actually a film series made up of near autonomous single reel twelve-minute melodramas. Most episodes of this serial are presumed lost. Others are available online.

== Production ==
Starring an independent, quick-thinking and inventive heroine, the series was filmed on location in the city of Glendale and in various parts of Tuolumne County in California. The film offered repeated dramatic situations for "Helen," a telegrapher, using such props as a moving train, a runaway boxcar, a heroine in distress tied to the railroad tracks, and other dangers. "Helen" did such things as leap off the roof of a building, roar around a sharp mountain curve behind the wheel of her speeding car, or jump onto a moving train from a car or a galloping horse while chasing the bad guy train robbers. Although the plot occasionally called for Helen to be rescued by a handsome male hero, in most episodes it was the dauntless Helen who found an ingenious way out of her dire predicament and single-handedly collared the bad guys, bringing them to justice.

The film series star, Helen Holmes, who began her career at Keystone Studios, did most of her own stunts. The series used several different stuntmen for the male parts, including Leo D. Maloney and the up-and-coming Harold Lloyd. Along with Pearl White, who starred in Pathé's adventure serial The Perils of Pauline, Helen Holmes became a much talked about national celebrity and major box-office draw.

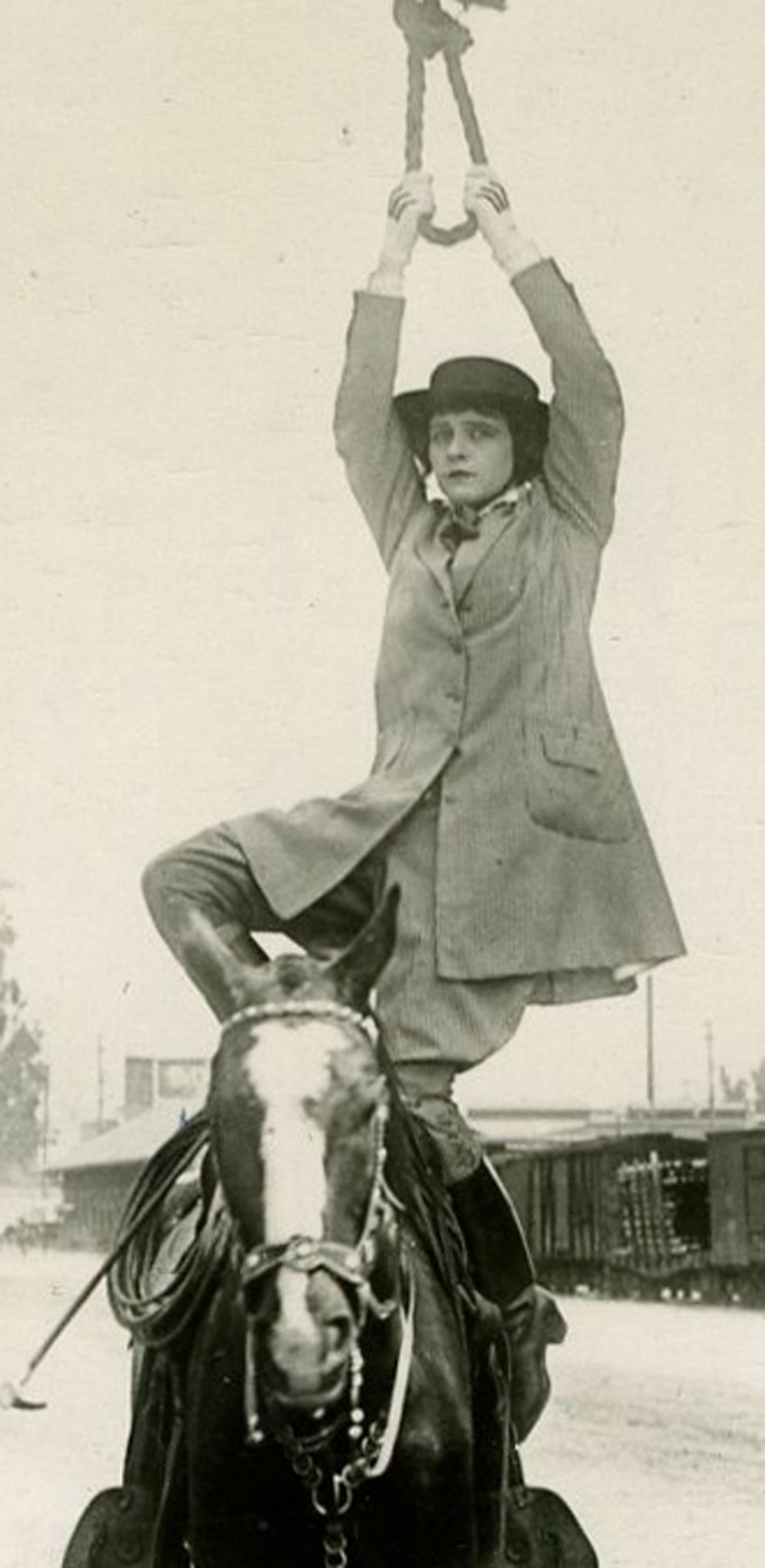
Helen Gibson

Prior to filming the "Night Operator at Buxton" (episode 18), Helen Holmes fell ill and Anna Q. Nilsson replaced her on that one occasion. After 26 episodes, Holmes and director J.P. McGowan left to set up their own film production company. While working on the serial, the two had begun a relationship that led to marriage. Director J. Gunnis Davis took over and Elsie McLeod substituted in episodes 27-49 until a permanent "Helen" could be found.

The heroine for the remainder of the series was played by Rose Wenger Gibson, at the time married to Hoot Gibson. Rechristened "Helen" by the Kalem Company, she rose to a celebrity status equal to that of Helen Holmes.

The Hazards of Helen was credited by the Las Vegas Age as the first great motion picture thrill to come to Las Vegas.

== Preservation ==
Episode 63 of The Hazards of Helen, The Open Track, was preserved by the Academy Film Archive in 2010. Episode 13, The Escape on the Fast Freight, was found in the Dawson Film Find in 1978.

== Episodes ==
- (1) Helen's Sacrifice
- (2) The Plot at the R.R. Cut
- (3) The Girl at the Throttle
- (4) The Stolen Engine
- (5) The Flying Freight's Captive
- (6) The Black Diamond Express
- (7) The Escape on the Limited
- (8) The Girl Telegrapher's Peril
- (9) The Leap from the Water Tower - available for free download from Internet Archive
- (10) The Broken Circuit
- (11) The Fast Mail's Danger
- (12) The Little Engineer
- (13) The Escape on the Fast Freight
- (14) The Red Signal
- (15) The Engineer's Peril
- (16) The Open Drawbridge
- (17) The Death Train
- (18) Night Operator at Buxton
- (19) Railroad Raiders of '62
- (20) The Girl at Lone Point
- (21) A Life in the Balance
- (22) The Girl on the Trestle
- (23) The Girl Engineer
- (24) A Race for a Crossing
- (25) The Box Car Trap
- (26) The Wild Engine
- (27) A Fiend at the Throttle
- (28) The Broken Train
- (29) A Railroader's Bravery
- (30) The Human Chain
- (31) The Pay Train
- (32) Near Eternity
- (33) In Danger's Path - available for free download at Internet Archive
- (34) The Midnight Limited
- (35) A Wild Ride
- (36) A Deed of Daring
- (37) The Girl on the Engine
- (38) The Fate of #1
- (39) The Substitute Fireman
- (40) The Limited's Peril
- (41) A Perilous Chance
- (42) Train Order #45
- (43) The Broken Rail
- (44) Nerves of Steel
- (45) A Girl's Grit
- (46) A Matter of Seconds
- (47) The Runaway Boxcar
- (48) The Water Tank Plot
- (49) A Test of Courage
- (50) A Mile a Minute
- (51) Rescue of the Brakeman's Children
- (52) Danger Ahead
- (53) The Girl and the Special
- (54) The Girl on the Bridge
- (55) The Dynamite Train
- (56) The Tramp Telegrapher
- (57) Crossed Wires
- (58) The Wrong Train Order
- (59) A Boy at the Throttle
- (60) At the Risk of Her Life
- (61) When Seconds Count
- (62) The Haunted Station
- (63) The Open Track
- (64) Tapped Wires
- (65) The Broken Wire
- (66) Perils of the Rails
- (67) A Perilous Swing
- (68) The Switchman's Story
- (69) A Girl Telegrapher's Nerve
- (70) A Race for a Life
- (71) The Girl Who Dared
- (72) The Detective's Peril
- (73) The Trapping of 'Peeler White'
- (74) The Record Run
- (75) The Race for a Siding
- (76) The Governor's Special - available for free download from Internet Archive
- (77) The Trail of Danger
- (78) The Human Telegram
- (79) The Bridge of Danger
- (80) One Chance in a Hundred
- (81) The Capture of Red Stanley
- (82) Spiked Switch
- (83) Treasure Train
- (84) A Race Through the Air
- (85) The Mysterious Cypher
- (86) The Engineer's Honor
- (87) To Save the Road
- (88) The Broken Brake
- (89) In Death's Pathway
- (90) A Plunge from the Sky
- (91) A Mystery of the Rails
- (92) Hurled Through the Drawbridge
- (93) With the Aid of The Wrecker
- (94) At Danger's Call
- (95) Secret of the Box Car
- (96) Ablaze on the Rails
- (97) The Hoodoo of Division B
- (98) Defying Death
- (99) The Death Swing
- (100) The Blocked Track
- (101) To Save the Special
- (102) A Daring Chance
- (103) The Last Messenger
- (104) The Gate of Death
- (105) The Lone Point Mystery
- (106) The Runaway Sleeper
- (107) The Forgotten Train Order
- (108) The Trial Run
- (109) The Lineman's Peril
- (110) The Midnight Express
- (111) The Vanishing Box Car
- (112) A Race with Death
- (113) The Morgul Mountain Mystery
- (114) The Fireman's Nemesis
- (115) The Wrecked Station
- (116) Railroad Claim Intrigue
- (117) The Death Siding
- (118) The Prima Donna's Special
- (119) The Side Tracked Sleeper

== See also ==
- Hoot Gibson filmography
- List of film serials
- List of film serials by studio
- Treasures from American Film Archives
