= Rubye De Remer =

American film actress and showgirl (1908–1984)

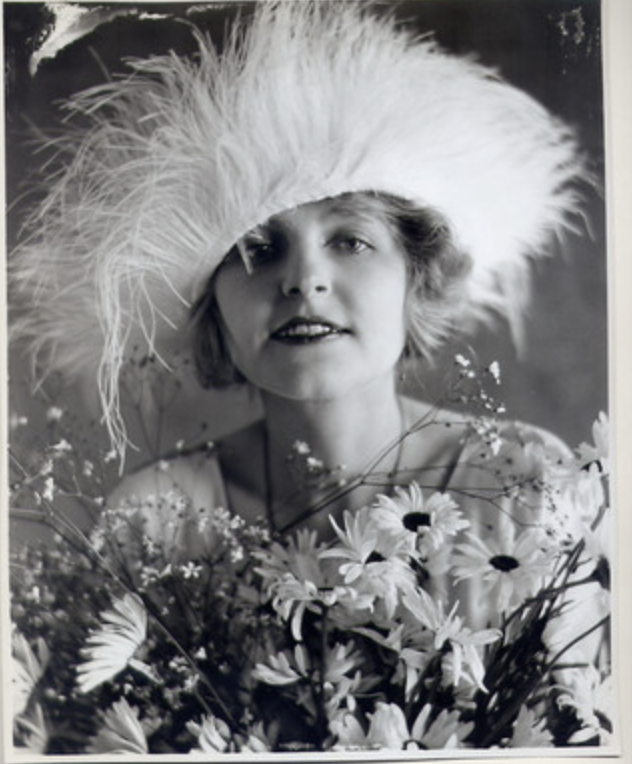
- Ruby De Remer, c. 1919
- Born: Rubye Katherine Burkhardt; January 9, 1892; Denver, Colorado U.S.
- Died: March 18, 1984 (aged 92); Beverley Hills, California, U.S.
- Occupations: Showgirl; Actress
- Years active: 1916–1936
- Spouses: Alan T. De Remer, 6/5/1912-10/29/1919 (Divorce); Benjamin H. Throop, 4/7/1924-5/10/1935 (his death)

Rubye De Remer (January 9, 1898 – March 18, 1984) was an American actress and showgirl known for her appearance in the "Ziegfeld Midnight Frolic" and over twenty films.

== Early life ==
De Remer was born Rubye K. Burkhardt in Denver, Colorado, on January 9, 1892. Her parents were Charles and Nettie Burkhardt. Her father was the owner of a Denver meatpacking company.

== Career ==
A report dated March 17, 1916, states that the "socially prominent" De Remer had left her husband and family to join the theatrical troupe of Gus Edwards in Dayton, Ohio.

Two weeks later, De Remer and a fellow "member of the Denver social set" are reportedly in New York City playing a hurdy-gurdy on Fifth Avenue. They were said to have arrived ten days ago to go on the stage but had no luck.

In May, De Remer was announced as a winner of a "prettiest girl contest" held by the World Film Interest at Grand Central Palace.

In October of the same year, De Remer was cast in the Ziegfeld Midnight Frolic.

In July 1917, De Remer was signed to a motion picture contract and announced as the star of the Laurence Trimble film The Auction Block, in the following month.

De Remer worked steadily and made over a dozen movies until she dropped out of the film business in 1923. She returned with a small role in the 1936 film The Gorgeous Hussy, after which she retired permanently.

== Personal beauty ==
French artist Paul Helleu chose De Remer as his "ideal of American beauty" in 1920.

Press accounts quoted Florenz Ziegfeld, Jr. referring to De Remer as "The most beautiful blonde since Venus."

For her part, De Remer claimed that "beauty is often a handicap." She said that an attractive woman in the theater is often typecast in minor "pretty" roles and does not get the best parts. "I want people to say of my work, 'she is more willing to cover her features with make-up and play strong character parts than she is to be 'dolled-up' in silks and satins and walk on and off a scene like a mannequin in a fashion parade," she said. "People pay for seats in a theater to see acting, not to witness a display of gowns or pulchritude [beauty].”

== Personal life ==
De Remer married Alan T. De Remer in Denver on June 5, 1912. The couple divorced on October 29, 1919.

She had a well-publicized romance with "American Millionaire" Benjamin Throop. In 1923, it was reported that "she had lost the companionship of the man to whom she had practically given her life in recent years." The man's wife allegedly refused a divorce, and his father "hired aid to part his son" from De Remer.

De Remer and Throop married on April 7, 1924, in Paris.

== Death ==
De Remer died in Beverly Hills, California, on March 18, 1984.

== Filmography ==
Year	Title	Role
1917	Enlighten Thy Daughter	Ruth Stevens
1917	Tillie Wakes Up	Mrs. Luella Pipkins
1917	Two Men and a Woman	
1917	The Auction Block	Lorelei Knight
1918	We Should Worry	Miss Ashton
1918	Ashes of Love	Ethel Woodridge
1918	Pals First	Jean Logan
1918	Life's Greatest Problem	Alice Webster
1918	For Freedom	Mary Fenton
1919	The Great Romance	Althea Hanway
1919	Fires of Faith	Agnes Traverse, His Fiancée
1919	Dust of Desire	Beth Vinton
1920	His Temporary Wife	Annabelle Rose
1920	A Fool and His Money	Aline
1920	The Way Women Love	Judith Reytnard
1921	The Passionate Pilgrim	Miriam Calverly
1921	Luxury	Blanche Young
1921	Pilgrims of the Night	Christine
1922	Unconquered Woman	Helen Chapelle
1923	The Glimpses of the Moon	Mrs. Ellie Vanderlyn
1923	Don't Marry for Money	Marion Whitney
1925	A Fool and His Money	
1936	The Gorgeous Hussy	Mrs. Bellamy
