= George Marshall (director) =

American actor, screenwriter, and film director (1891–1975)

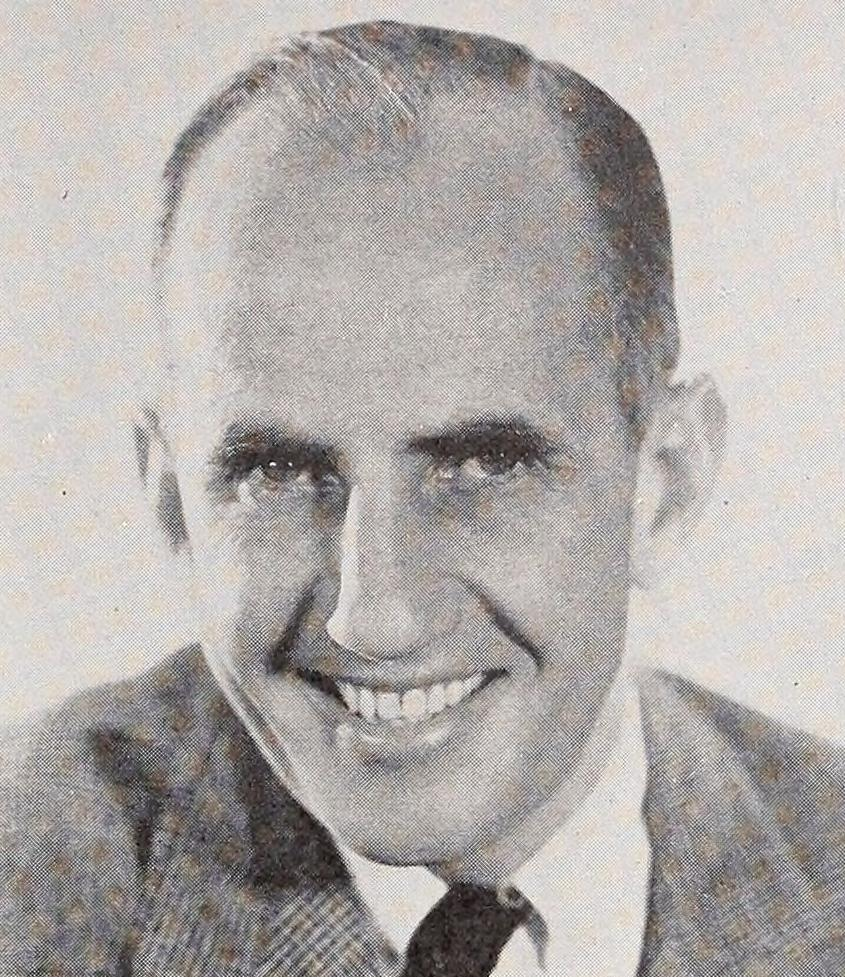
- Marshall circa 1940
- Born: December 29, 1891; Chicago, Illinois, U.S.
- Died: February 17, 1975 (aged 83); Los Angeles, California, U.S.
- Other name: George E. Marshall
- Occupations: Actor, screenwriter, producer, film and television director
- Years active: 1915–1975
- Spouse: Germaine Desiree Minet (m. 1919)
- Children: 2

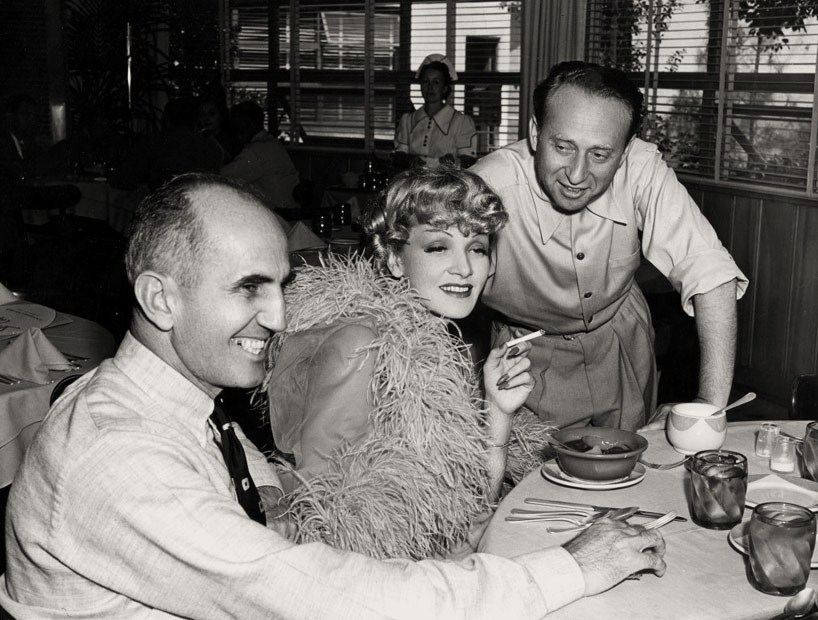
Marshall (left) with Marlene Dietrich and producer Joe Pasternak on the set of the 1939 film Destry Rides Again

George E. Marshall (December 29, 1891 – February 17, 1975) was an American actor, screenwriter, producer, film and television director, active through the first six decades of film history.

Relatively few of Marshall's films are well-known today, with Destry Rides Again (1939), The Ghost Breakers (1940), The Blue Dahlia (1946), The Sheepman (1958), and How the West Was Won (1962) being the biggest exceptions. John Houseman called him "one of the old maestros of Hollywood ... he had never become one of the giants but he held a solid and honorable position in the industry."

In the 1930s, he established a reputation for comedy, directing Laurel and Hardy in three classic films, and also working on a variety of comedies for Fox, though many of his films at Fox were destroyed in a vault fire in 1937. Later in his career he was particularly sought after for comedies. He did around half a dozen films each with Bob Hope and Jerry Lewis, and also worked with W. C. Fields, Jackie Gleason, and Will Rogers.

== Biography ==
=== Early life ===
Marshall dropped out of the University of Chicago and worked a journalist and a mechanic. He was working as a logger in Washington when he decided to go to Los Angeles in 1912 to visit his mother. Marshall served as a combat cinematographer with the U.S. Army Signal Corps in France during World War I.

Marshall decided to return to Hollywood and work in the movies. He initially worked as an extra. He and another extra, future director Frank Lloyd, once pooled their money to buy a suit and get more work. Marshall eventually moved into stunt work, then directing.

=== Harry Carey and Neal Hart ===
Marshall's early directorial work most starred Harry Carey and Neal Hart. He said his first film was the Carey three reeler The Committee on Credentials (1916). He also directed Love's Lariat (1916) and A Woman's Eyes (1917), all with Carey, and The Man from Montana (1917) with Hart. He worked with other actors too, such as Hoot Gibson in The Midnight Flyer (1918) and Ruth Roland in the serials The Adventures of Ruth (1919) and Ruth of the Rockies (1920).

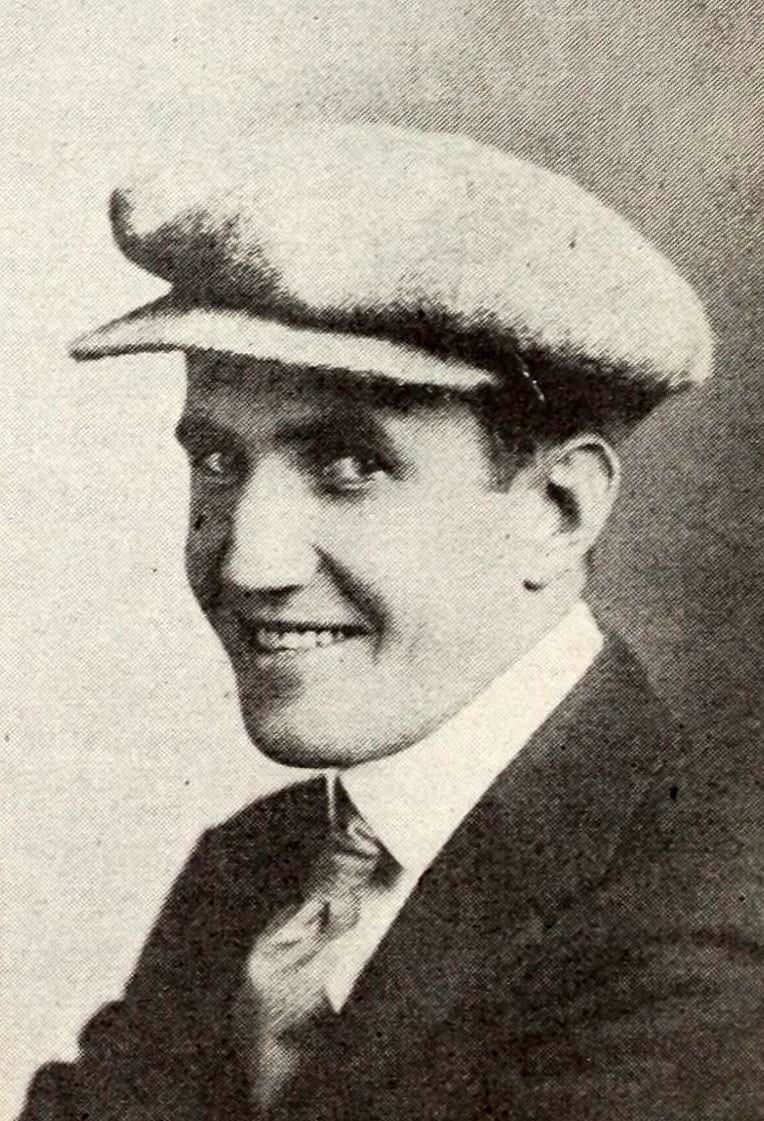
Marshall circa 1921

=== Tom Mix ===
In the early 1920s Marshall directed a series of movies starring Tom Mix including Prairie Trails (1920). For most of the 1920s Marshall directed short films, notably at Fox. In the mid-1920s he was appointed general supervisor of Fox comedy shorts. His credits included A Flaming Affair with Lex Neal.

=== Laurel and Hardy ===
Marshall directed a series of Laurel and Hardy films including Pack Up Your Troubles (1932), Their First Mistake (1932), and Towed in a Hole (1932). He also played a menacing, vengeful chef in Pack Up Your Troubles, and made a brief appearance in Their First Mistake.

=== Fox Films ===
Marshall took a long-term contract at Fox where his films included Wild Gold (1934) and two with Alice Faye, She Learned About Sailors (1934) and 365 Nights in Hollywood (1934).

Fox entrusted him with one of the studio's biggest stars, Will Rogers in Life Begins at 40 (1935). He did a comedy, $10 Raise (1935), and a musical with Faye, Music Is Magic (1935).

Marshall stayed with Fox when it merged with 20th Century to become 20th Century-Fox. He did a crime film, Show Them No Mercy! (1935), a Jane Withers vehicle Can This Be Dixie? (1936), and a war film with Barbara Stanwyck and Wallace Beery, A Message to Garcia (1936).

After another crime film, The Crime of Dr. Forbes (1936) he did Nancy Steele Is Missing! (1937) with Victor McLaglen, Love Under Fire (1937) with Loretta Young and Battle of Broadway (1938) with McLaglen.

=== Universal ===
Sam Goldwyn borrowed Marshall to direct The Goldwyn Follies (1938).

Marshall went to Universal where he directed W. C. Fields in You Can't Cheat an Honest Man (1939). Then he had a huge success with Marlene Dietrich and James Stewart in Destry Rides Again (1939). He did another Western at Universal, When the Daltons Rode (1940).

Marshall went to Paramount, where he directed Bob Hope and Paulette Goddard in a successful horror-comedy The Ghost Breakers (1940).

Marshall, Goddard and Stewart made Pot o' Gold (1941) for United Artists. Then Marshall went to Columbia for Texas (1941) with Glenn Ford and William Holden, and RKO for Valley of the Sun (1942) with Lucille Ball. During the making of the latter he celebrated his 25th year in films. By the early 1940s he was best known as a director of Westerns.

=== Paramount ===
Paramount were delighted with The Ghost Breakers and offered Marshall a long-term contract. He did The Forest Rangers (1942) with Goddard and Fred MacMurray and directed the studio's all-star Star Spangled Rhythm (1942).

Marshall was among the studio's leading directors by now. He worked with Dorothy Lamour and Dick Powell in Riding High (1943), and Mary Martin in True to Life (1943). He did And the Angels Sing (1944) with Lamour, MacMurray and the new star Betty Hutton, then did a comedy with MacMurray Murder, He Says (1945).

Marshall did a biopic of Texas Guinan starring Hutton, Incendiary Blonde (1945), then a comedy with Eddie Bracken and Veronica Lake, Hold That Blonde (1945).

Marshall had a big success with The Blue Dahlia (1946), starring Alan Ladd and Lake, from a script by Raymond Chandler.

Also popular was a comedy he made with Bob Hope, Monsieur Beaucaire (1946), and one with Hutton, The Perils of Pauline (1947), a tribute to the old serials that Marshall himself used to direct; it was produced by Sol Siegel.

Paramount got him to do another revue-style film, Variety Girl (1947).

In 1946 Sight and Sound magazine said Marshall had become:

One of our leading directors of comedy. Not comedy of ideas, however fuzzy or pretentious as with Preston Sturges, the "art" comedy. But showmanship, the Paramount, the Hollywood romantic comedy... of recent years had become so syrupy, plotty and ungay. Marshall has not remodelled the form or made drastic changes. But he has lightened it, sped it up, taken stories that would have remained solemn bores with more literal minded directors and made entertainment out of them, by having a little fun, going just a little wild in the process... With a style that is extroverted, clean, limber, above all natural, casual in its use of slapstick with the effect of making Sturges' slapstick seem almost studied, Marshall, you'll probably find, is the director credit that will explain how many a film with all the external attributes of a stinker... kept you in your seat, interested to the end, as it were, in spite of yourself.

Marshall did a comedy with Goddard and MacDonald Carey, Hazard (1948), then he was borrowed by Walter Wanger for Tap Roots (1948) starring Susan Hayward.

In 1948 he quit Bonanza (which became Lust for Gold) with Glenn Ford and Ida Lupino after four days of filming due to disputes with producer S. Sylvan Simon. However he bounced back with My Friend Irma (1949) which introduced Martin and Lewis.

In 1949 Paramount extended its contract with him for two more years. He was reunited with Ball and Hope in Fancy Pants (1950), then did two with MacMurray, Never a Dull Moment (1950) at RKO and A Millionaire for Christy (1951) at Fox.

In 1950 Marshall and William Holden announced they had formed a company to make half hour TV shows but it appears they were not made.

Back at Paramount he did The Savage (1952) with Charlton Heston, Off Limits (1953) with Hope and Mickey Rooney, and Scared Stiff (1953) with Martin and Lewis (remaking his earlier Ghost Breakers) .

He did a biopic, Houdini (1953) with Tony Curtis, then Money from Home (1954) with Martin and Lewis, and Red Garters (1954) with Rosemary Clooney.

Marshall went to South Africa to make Duel in the Jungle (1954) then back at Paramount remade his own Destry Rides Again as Destry (1954) with Audie Murphy.

=== Freelance ===
Marshall went to Universal to do a musical, The Second Greatest Sex (1955), and a Western, Pillars of the Sky (1956). He returned to Africa to make Beyond Mombassa (1956) with Cornel Wilde for Columbia.

Also at Columbia he made The Guns of Fort Petticoat (1957) with Audie Murphy, produced by Murphy.

He went back to Paramount to make The Sad Sack (1957), Jerry Lewis' second film without Dean Martin.

=== Glenn Ford ===
Marshall then received an offer from MGM, who were then being run by Sol Siegel, to direct Glenn Ford in a Western, The Sheepman (1958). It was a hit, so he stayed at the studio to direct Imitation General (1959), with Ford; The Mating Game (1959) with Debbie Reynolds; and It Started with a Kiss (1959) and The Gazebo (1959), both with Reynolds and Ford. All these films were popular.

Marshall and Ford made Cry for Happy (1961) at Columbia, which featured location filming in Japan. He announced plans to make a biopic of Ruth Roland with Debbie Reynolds but it was not made.

Then Marshall directed Rita Hayworth in The Happy Thieves (1963) and directed the railroad segment of MGM's epic How the West Was Won (1963) in Cinerama.

In 1963 he celebrated his fiftieth year as a director. "You try to keep up with the spirit of the times", he said. ""You go along with it or wonder why they don't call you any more... Some of my friends have let the world go by them. They couldn't understand the changes... I don't think people have basically changed. They still want to be entertained."

Marshall said his credo was "you should see possibilities and they lead you to other things later on. If you're a mechanic you just do it as written. If you're – I wouldn't say an artist – then you try to make more of it. It's easy to be a mechanic."

Marshall did Papa's Delicate Condition (1963) with Jackie Gleason, Dark Purpose (1964) with Shirley Jones and Advance to the Rear (1964) with Ford. He also did the pilot for Daniel Boone.

=== Later career ===
In the late 1960s Marshall moved increasingly into television.

His later feature credits include two with Hope, Boy, Did I Get a Wrong Number! (1966) and Eight on the Lam (1967) and The Wicked Dreams of Paula Schultz (1968) with Elke Sommer.

His last feature that he directed was Hook, Line & Sinker (1969) starring Lewis.

Lucille Ball chose George Marshall to direct eleven episodes of her Here's Lucy television series in 1969, having previously worked in several Marshall comedies herself.

He appeared as an actor in The Crazy World of Julius Vrooder in 1974, his last feature film.

His last professional job was an acting appearance in Police Woman. Three days before he died he was inducted into the Academy of Motion Picture Arts and Sciences Hall of Fame.

== Personal life ==
Marshall married Germaine, who he met in France after World War I. They had two children, a son and a daughter.

Marshall died after a two-week illness. He is buried in Holy Cross Cemetery in Culver City, Los Angeles.

For his contribution to the film industry, George Marshall has a star on the Hollywood Walk of Fame at 7048 Hollywood Boulevard.

== Partial filmography ==
- And the Best Man Won (1915) (short) – story
- Across the Rio Grande (1916) (short) – writer, director – with Neal Hart
- The Committee on Credentials (1916) (short) – director – with Harry Carey
- Liberty (1916) (serial) – assistant director
- Love's Lariat (1916) – writer, director – with Harry Carey, Neal Hart
- A Woman's Eyes (1916) - writer, director – with Harry Carey
- The Devil's Own (1916) – director
- Won by Grit (1917) – director
- The Comeback (1917) (short) – director, producer
- They Were Four (1917) (short) – writer, director – with Joe Rickson
- Border Wolves (1917) (short) – story, director – with Neal Hart
- Roped In (1917) – story, director – with Neal Hart
- The Raid (1917) – writer, director – with Neal Hart
- The Desert Ghost (1917) – director
- Bill Brennan's Claim (1917) – director
- Casey's Border Raid (1917) – story, director – with Neal Hart
- The Honor of Men (1917) – director
- Swede Hearts (1917) – story, director – with Neal Hart
- Meet My Wife (1917) – story, director – with Neal Hart
- Double Suspicion (1917) – story, director – with Neal Hart
- Right of Way Casey (1917) – story, director – with Neal Hart
- Squaring It (1917) – story, director – with Neal Hart
- The Ninth Day (1917) – director
- The Man from Montana (1917) – story, director – with Neal Hart
- Quick Triggers (1918) (short) – director, writer – with Neal Hart
- The Midnight Flyer (1918) (short) – director – with Hoot Gibson
- Naked Fists (1918) (short) – director, writer – with Neal Hart
- Beating the Limited (1918) (short) – director, story – with Neal Hart
- When Paris Saw Green Red (1918) (short) – director
- The Fast Mail (1919) (short) – director
- The Husband Hunter (1919) – director
- The Gun Runners (1919) – director, story
- The Adventures of Ruth (1919) (serial) – director – with Ruth Roland
- Charlot! Charlot! (1919) – director
- Ruth of the Rockies (1920) (serial) – director – with Ruth Roland
- Prairie Trails (1920) – director - with Tom Mix
- Why Trust Your Husband? (1921) – director, story
- Hands Off! (1921) – director – with Tom Mix
- A Ridin' Romeo (1921) – director, story – with Tom Mix
- After Your Own Heart (1921) – director – with Tom Mix
- The Lady from Longacre (1921) – director
- The Jolt (1921) – director, writer – with Edna Murphy
- Smiles Are Trumps (1922) – director
- West Is West (1922) (short) – director
- The Haunted Valley (1923) – director
- Don Quickshot of the Rio Grande (1923) – director
- Where is This West? (1923) – director
- Men in the Raw (1923) – director
- The Back Trail (1924) – director
- The Fight (1924) (short) – director
- The Hunt (1924) (short) – director
- The Race (1924) (short) – director
- Paul Jones Jr (1924) (short) – director
- The Burglar (1924) (short) – director
- All Abroad (1925) (short) – producer
- A Spanish Romeo (1925) (short) – director
- The Big Game Hunter (1925) (short) – director
- The Sky Jumper (1925) (short) – director
- A Parisian Knight (1925) (short) – director
- Neptune's Stepdaughter (1925) (short) – supervisor
- Pawnshop Politics (1926) (short) – producer
- Matrimony Blues (1926) (short) – producer
- A Bankrupt Honeymoon (1926) (short) – supervisor
- From a Cabby's Seat (1926) (short) – director
- Moving Day (1926) (short) – supervisor
- The Steeplechaser (1926) (short) – producer
- King of the Kitchen (1926) (short) – producer
- A1 Society (1926) (short) – supervisor
- The Non-Stop Bride (1926) (short) – supervisor
- The Battling Kangaroo (1926) (short) – supervisor
- Golf Widows (1926) (short) – supervisor
- A Trip to Chinatown (1926) – production supervisor
- Girls (1927) (short) – director
- A Dog's Pal (1927) (short) – production supervisor
- The Kangaroo Detective (1927) (short) – production supervisor
- A Man About Town (1927) (short) – director, producer
- Wine, Women and Sauerkraut (1927) (short) – production supervisor
- Rumors for Rent (1927) (short) – production supervisor
- Suite Homes (1927) (short) – production supervisor
- The Gay Retreat (1927) (short) – production supervisor
- Gentlemen Prefer Scotch (1927) (short) – director
- Slippery Silks (1927) (short) – producer
- The Adventures of Ruth (1927) (short) – director
- Twenty Legs Under the Sea (1927) (short) – supervisor
- Captain Kidd's Kittens (1927) (short) – supervisor
- The Elephant's Elbows (1928) (short) – supervisor
- Bear Knees (1928) (short) – supervisor
- No Picnic (1928) (short) – director
- No Sale Smitty (1928) (short) – director
- Camping Out (1928) (short) – director
- No Vacation (1929) (short) – director
- Circus Time (1929) (short) – director
- No Children (1929) (short) – director
- Watch My Smoke (1929) (short) – director
- Tomato Omlette (1929) (short) – director
- Puckered Success (1929) (short) – director
- Uncle's Visit (1929) (short) – director
- Hey Diddle Diddle (1930) (short) – director, writer – with Nick Basil
- He Loved Her Not (1931) (short) – director
- How I Play Golf (1931) – series of 12 shorts starring Bobby Jones – director
- Big Dame Hunting (1932) (short) – director, story – with Ned Sparks
- Just a Pain in the Parlor (1932) (short) – director
- Strictly Unreliable (1932) (short) – director
- The Old Bull (1932) (short) – director
- Pack Up Your Troubles (1932) (short) – director, actor
- Alum and Eve (1932) (short) – director - with Pitts and Todd
- A Firehouse Honeymoon (1932) (short) – director
- Their First Mistake (1932) (short) – director – with Laurel and Hardy
- Towed in a Hole (1932) (short) – director, idea – with Laurel and Hardy
- Easy on the Eyes (1933) (short) – director
- Calienete Love (1933) (short) – director
- Sweet Cookie (1933) (short) – director
- Knock Out Kisses (1933) (short) – director
- Husbands' Reunion (1933) (short) – director
- The Big Fibber (1933) (short) – director
- How to Break 90 (1933) – a series of 6 shorts starring Bobby Jones – director
- Olsen's Big Moment (1933) – story
- 365 Nights in Hollywood (1934) – director – with Alice Faye
- She Learned About Sailors (1934) – director – with Alice Faye
- Wild Gold (1934) – director
- Call It Luck (1934) – story
- Ever Since Eve (1934) – director
- Life Begins at 40 (1935) – director
- In Old Kentucky (1935) – director
- Show Them No Mercy! (1935) – director
- Music is Magic (1935) – director
- $10 Raise (1935) – director
- A Message to Garcia (1936) – director
- The Crime of Dr. Forbes (1936) – director
- Love Under Fire (1937) – director
- Can This Be Dixie? (1937) – director, story
- Nancy Steele Is Missing! (1937) – director
- Hold That Co-ed (1938) – director
- Battle of Broadway (1938) – director
- The Goldwyn Follies (1938) – director
- You Can't Cheat an Honest Man (1939) – director
- Destry Rides Again (1939) – director
- The Ghost Breakers (1940) – director
- When the Daltons Rode (1940) – director
- Pot o' Gold (1941) – director
- Texas (1941) – director
- Star Spangled Rhythm (1942) – director
- Valley of the Sun (1942) – director
- The Forest Rangers (1942) – director
- True to Life (1943) – director
- Riding High (1943) – director
- And the Angels Sing (1944) – director
- Murder, He Says (1945) – director
- Hold That Blonde (1945) – director
- Incendiary Blonde (1945) – director
- The Blue Dahlia (1946) – director
- Monsieur Beaucaire (1946) – director
- The Perils of Pauline (1947) – director
- Variety Girl (1947) – director, cameo
- Hazard (1948) – director
- Tap Roots (1948) – director
- Lust for Gold (1949) – directed for a few days before leaving film
- My Friend Irma (1949) – director
- Never a Dull Moment (1950) – director
- Fancy Pants (1950) – director
- Ace of Clubs (1951) (short) – director with Bobby Jones
- A Millionaire for Christy (1951) – director
- The Savage (1952) – director
- Off Limits (1952) – director
- Money from Home (1953) – director
- Scared Stiff (1953) – director
- Houdini (1953) – director
- Duel in the Jungle (1954) – director
- Red Garters (1954) – director
- Destry (1954) – director
- The Second Greatest Sex (1955) – director
- Screen Directors Playhouse (1955) (TV series) – director, story – 1 episode "The Silent Partner" with Buster Keaton
- Cavalcade of America (1955) (TV series) – actor episode "How to Raise a Boy"
- Beyond Mombasa (1956) – director
- Pillars of the Sky (1956) – director
- The Guns of Fort Petticoat (1957) – director
- The Sad Sack (1957) – director
- The Sheepman (1958) – director
- Imitation General (1958) – director
- The Mating Game (1959) – director
- It Started with a Kiss (1959) – director
- The Gazebo (1959) – director
- Cry for Happy (1961) – director
- The Happy Thieves (1961) – director
- How the West Was Won (1962) – director (the railroad scenes)
- Papa's Delicate Condition (1963) – director
- Advance to the Rear (1964) – director
- Dark Purpose (1964) – director
- Valentine's Day (1964–65) (TV series) – director 5 episodes
- The Wackiest Ship in the Army (1964) (TV series) – director 1 episode
- Daniel Boone (1964–70) (TV series) – director 10 episodes
- Boy, Did I Get a Wrong Number! (1966) – director
- Tarzan (1966) (TV series) – director 1 episode
- Eight on the Lam (1967) – director
- The Wicked Dreams of Paula Schultz (1968) – director
- Hook, Line & Sinker (1969) – director
- Here's Lucy (1969) (TV series) – director 10 episodes – actor in episode "Lucy Runs the Rapids"
- Cade's County (1972) (TV series) – director 1 episode
- Hec Ramsey (1972) (TV series) – director 1 episode
- The Odd Couple (1972) (TV series) – director 2 episodes
- The Crazy World of Julius Vrooder (1974) – actor
- Police Woman (1975) (TV series) – actor in episode "Blast"

== Awards and nominations ==
Year	Award	Result	Category	Film
1964	Western Heritage Awards	Won	Theatrical Motion Picture	How the West Was Won (shared with John Ford, Henry Hathaway, and James R. Webb)
1967	Laurel Awards	Nominated	Director	-
