= Smashing Through =

Smashing Through may refer to:

- Smashing Through (1929 film), a British silent adventure film
- Smashing Through (1918 film), an American silent Western film
