= Timber Queen =

Timber Queen may refer to:

- The Timber Queen, an American 1922 film serial directed by Fred Jackman
- Timber Queen (1944 film), an American 1944 film directed by Frank McDonald
