= The Timber Queen =

1922 film

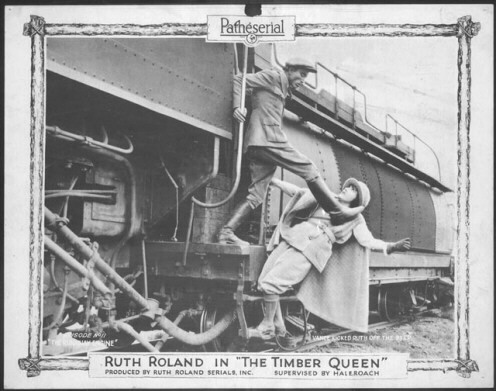
- Lobby card
- Directed by: Fred Jackman
- Screenplay by: Bertram Millhauser
- Story by: Carl Krusada (as Val Cleveland)
- Produced by: Hal Roach (as Hal E. Roach)
- Starring: Ruth Roland; Bruce Gordon
- Edited by: Richard C. Currier
- Production companies: Ruth Roland Serials; United Studios Inc.
- Distributed by: Pathé Exchange
- Release date: July 16, 1922
- Running time: 15 episodes
- Country: United States
- Language: Silent (English intertitles)

The Timber Queen is a 1922 American action silent film serial directed by Fred Jackman. The film serial stars Ruth Roland and Bruce Gordon. Produced by Pathé Exchange, the serial was advertised as "The beautiful scenery! The forest, the train, everything just looks so 'outdoors'! Great cinematography." Next to Pearl White, another of Pathe studio's prominent serial queens, Ruth Roland appears in Western serials like Ruth of the Rockies (1920) and White Eagle (1922). (Note: Ruth Roland was advertised as a "superwoman" who performed her own stunts and was the only woman listed in the "Top 10 Cowboy Stars".)

== Plot ==
After the death of her father, Ruth Reading (Ruth Roland) inherits ownership of a large acreage of forest. Don Mackay (Bruce Gordon) is a neighboring farmer who is in love with Ruth, but is too bashful to tell her.

Ruth's cousin, James Cluxton (Val Paul) receives a letter informing him that if Ruth does not marry by the time of her 21st birthday, then the ownership of the forest will be his. He remembers that in three months, Ruth will turn 21. Cluxton's confidant, "Bull" Joyce (Leo Willis) tells him that Ruth is spending a lot of time with Don Mackay. Joyce is sure if the relationship was to continue, Cluxton can say goodbye to inheriting the forest.

Vance (Frank Lackteen), another lumberjack overhears the conversation. He rides off to warn Don. Back at the sawmill, Vance watches Cluxton and Joyce who are already scheming to get control of the timber lands. The pair see Ruth seated atop a box car precipitating the idea to do away with her. Cluxton "accidentally" throws a piece of lumber onto a rail track which releases the box car into an uncontrollable descent, rushing down the hillside with Ruth helplessly on top of it.

Don comes to her rescue, riding on his horse and reaching out to Ruth. He saves her in the nick of time, swinging from a rope attached to a tree and grabbing her as the boxcar dives off the track and into a creek.

Thanking him for saving her life, Ruth and Don talk of their future together, oblivious they are standing in the path of an oncoming train. The train stops; they laugh and jump onto the front of it... They talk about: "... from out of the abyss and into a bright future".

Cluxton and his men continue to find ways to threaten Ruth and Don. He even fakes his own death from drowning and makes sure that Bull Joyce will implicate Don.

== Chapter titles ==
The serial consisted of 15 two reel episodes:

Lobby card for Chapter 3

1. The Log Jam
2. The Flaming Forest
3. Guilty as Charged
4. Go Get Your Man
5. The Yukon Trail
6. The Hidden Pearl
7. Mutiny!
8. The Smugglers Cave
9. Horned Fury
10. Human Vultures
11. The Runaway Engine
12. The Abyss
13. The Stolen Wedding
14. One Day to Go
15. The Silver Lining

== Cast ==
- Ruth Roland as Ruth Reading
- Bruce Gordon as Don Mackay
- Val Paul as James Cluxton
- Leo Willis as Bull Joyce
- Frank Lackteen as Vance
- Bull Montana
- Al Ferguson
- Al Freez (credited as Otto Freez)
- Chris Lynton (credited as Chris Linton)

== Production ==
Filming of The Timber Queen took place in and around Truckee, California from October 3, 1921 – February 27, 1922. A Curtiss JN-4 "Jenny" was featured in the film.

== Reception ==
Aviation film historian James H. Farmer in Celluloid Wings: The Impact of Movies on Aviation (1984), described The Timber Queen as: "In one of Ruth Roland's finest stunt-suspense series, she vies with a timber trust for control of rich Sierra timberland. Aerial stunting featured in some chapters." A modern appraisal of the serial "Short and sweet, a bit too short in fact! Great outdoors photography, exciting mounted camera footage and a happy ending. I liked it."~ Lord Heath.

== Preservation status ==
The Timber Queen is considered to be lost, although the UCLA Film and Television Archive has episodes one, four, eight and nine, and a cut-down version of episode twelve is in the collection of the Niles Essanay Silent Film Museum and at least one private collection.

== See also ==
- List of film serials
- List of film serials by studio
