= William Wadsworth Hodkinson =

American businessman (1881–1971)

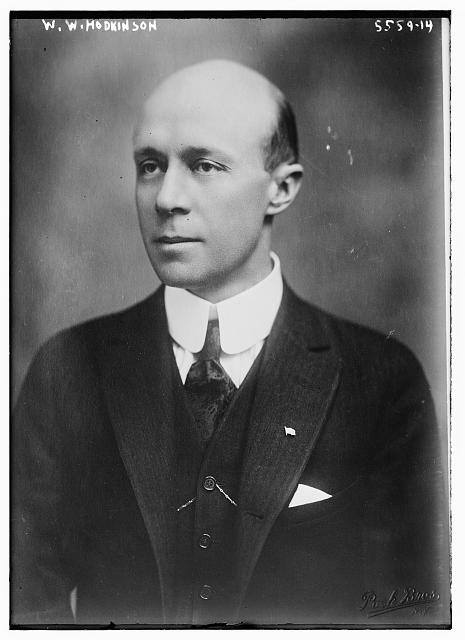
- W. W. Hodkinson
- Born: August 16, 1881; Independence, Kansas
- Died: June 2, 1971 (aged 89); Los Angeles, California
- Occupation: Businessman
- Years active: 1907–1929
- Known for: Founding Paramount Pictures

William Wadsworth Hodkinson (August 16, 1881 – June 2, 1971), known more commonly as W. W. Hodkinson, was an American businessman best known for founding Paramount Pictures. Hodkinson opened one of the first movie theaters in Ogden, Utah in 1907 and within just a few years changed the way movies were produced, distributed, and exhibited.

Hodkinson became a leading West Coast film distributor in the early days of motion pictures and in 1914 he founded and became president of the first nationwide film exchange, Paramount Pictures Corporation. Hodkinson was also responsible for sketching the mountain that became the Paramount logo in 1914. He was referred to as The Man Who Invented Hollywood.

After being driven out of Paramount, Hodkinson established his own independent distribution company, the W. W. Hodkinson Corporation, in 1917, before selling it off in 1924. Hodkinson left the motion picture business completely in 1929 to form Hodkinson Aviation Corporation, and later formed the Central American Aviation Corporation and Companía Nacional de Aviación in Guatemala.

== Career ==
As a young man, Hodkinson was a messenger with the Western Union Telegraph Company, and he worked for other companies as a messenger, callboy, telegrapher, and signal operator. In 1902, he was a trick bicycle rider and later became a salesman with ICS.

=== Film business ===
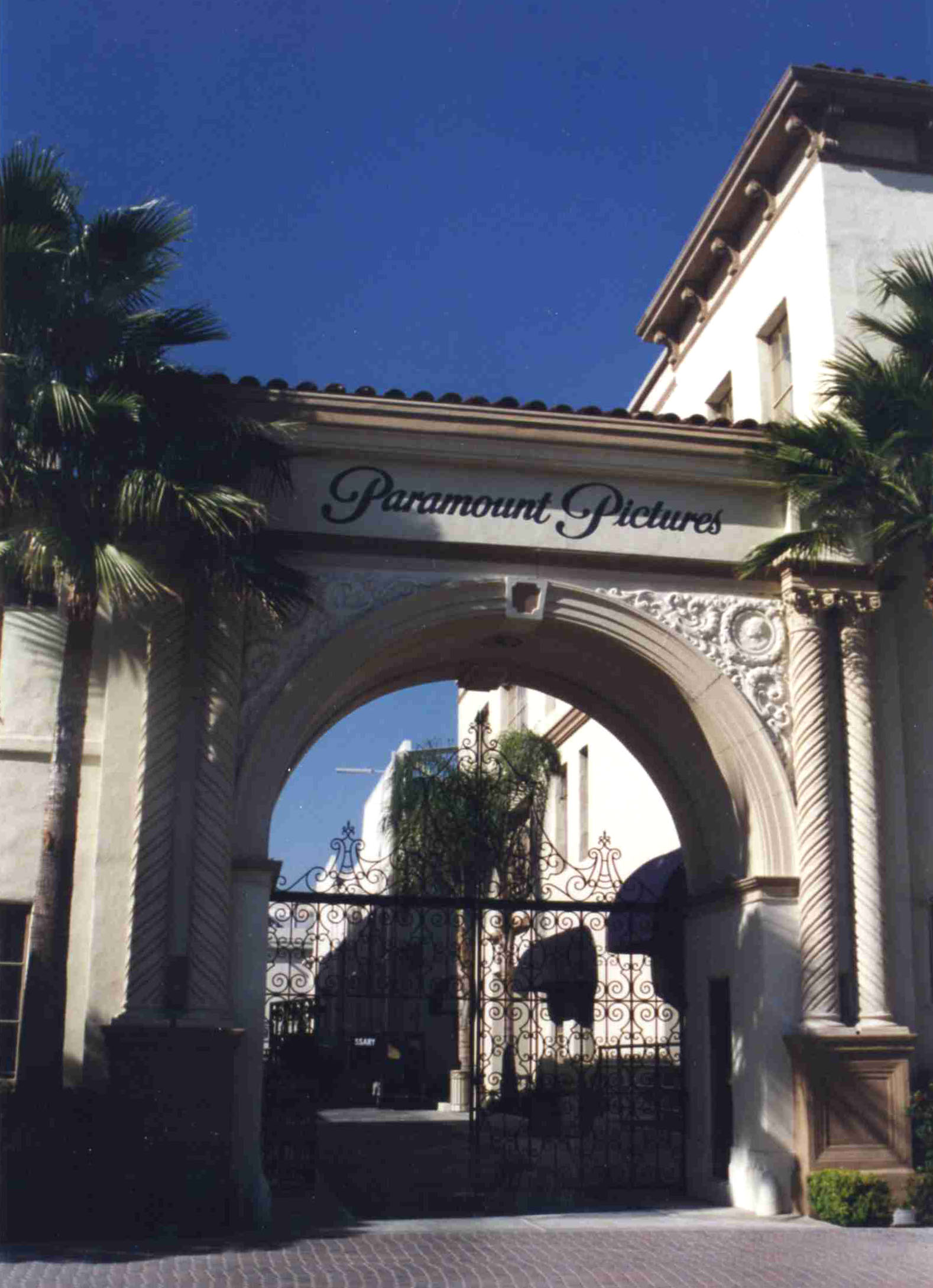

Hodkinson opened one of the first movie theaters in Ogden, Utah in 1907 and charged five-cents a show. Two-years later, he was charging ten-cents admission and changing films twice weekly. With this successful strategy he was able to buy out his only two competitors as he expanded into Salt Lake City, Utah. Hodkinson then joined General Film Company and became one of the leading West Coast film distributors, expanding into Los Angeles and San Francisco.

On May 8, 1914, Hodkinson merged 11 film rental bureaus to create the first U.S.-wide distributor of feature films, Paramount Pictures. In addition to gaining a huge efficiency advantage over the previous regional States' Rights and Road Show systems of film distribution, Paramount introduced the concept of block-booking. This meant that exhibitors who wanted a particular movie had to buy a bundled package containing movies from all of the companies that signed exclusive rights agreements with Paramount, including Adolph Zukor's Famous Players Film Company, the Jesse L. Lasky Feature Play Company, and others. Hodkinson's plan guaranteed exhibitors a steady supply of features because Paramount would help producers finance and advertise their pictures with advance rentals collected by the exchanges. In return, Paramount charged producers a distribution fee of 35 percent of gross to cover operating costs and profit. The 'Hodkinson System' of film distribution existed with few changes for almost a century.

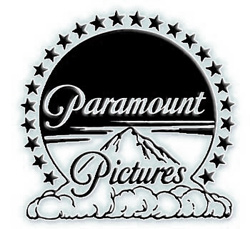
First Paramount Pictures logo

Hodkinson first designed the Paramount logo in 1914. Legend has it that he doodled an image of a star-crested mountain on a napkin, clouds, and 12 stars. During a meeting with Adolph Zukor. It was an image of Utah's Ben Lomond Mountain in Ogden, Utah. According to a plaque in the Paramount Studios Lobby, Hollywood, CA this mountain, Ben Lomond, was inspired from his childhood memories, combined with the scripted word Paramount became the beginnings of the logo we know today.

In 1916, Famous Players–Lasky formed from the merger of Famous Players Film Company and the Jesse L. Lasky Feature Play Company. The newly merged film studios acquired Paramount and became the parent company. Zukor soon fired Hodkinson and took over as president of Paramount and added motion-picture production to the company's film distribution business. Following his ouster, Hodkinson sold his Paramount interest to S.A. Lynch, one of Paramount's distribution franchise holders.

Hodkinson soon joined Raymond Pawley to start Superpictures Incorporated in November 1916, and was the producer for the Leon F. Douglass color feature film Cupid Angling (1918).

Hodkinson also served as president of the Triangle Distributing Company, the distribution arm of the Triangle Film Corporation. Hodkinson owned Triangle Distributing together with Pawley and his Paramount partner Lynch. After leaving Triangle, Hodkinson formed the W. W. Hodkinson Corporation, later reorganized as Producers Distributing Corporation (PDC). PDC lasted until 1929 and played an important role during Cecil B. DeMille's short-lived but ambitious plans as a full-fledged independent filmmaker in the late 1920s.

=== Commercial aviation ===
Hodkinson left the motion picture business in 1929 to form an airplane manufacturing concern, Hodkinson Aviation Corporation. Soon thereafter Hodkinson joined with Roderick Burnham, the son of Frederick Russell Burnham, to form the Central American Aviation Corporation and Companía Nacional de Aviación in Guatemala. Ultimately, a series of accidents forced Hodkinson and his company out of Guatemala in 1936. Grupo TACA later acquired Compañia Nacional de Aviación, S.A. of Guatemala.
