= Kingfisher's Roost =

1921 film

The Kingfisher's Roost
- Directed by: Louis Chaudet; Paul Hurst
- Written by: Louis Chaudet; Paul Hurst
- Starring: Neal Hart; William Quinn; Ben Corbett
- Production company: Pinnacle Productions
- Distributed by: Pinnacle Productions
- Release date: September 1921
- Running time: 50 minutes
- Country: United States
- Languages: Silent; English intertitles

The Kingfisher's Roost is a 1921 American silent Western film directed by Louis Chaudet and Paul Hurst and starring Neal Hart, William Quinn and Ben Corbett. It was made and distributed by the independent Pinnacle Productions.

== Cast ==
- Neal Hart as Barr Messenger
- Yvette Mitchell as Betty Brownlee
- William Quinn as 'Bull' Keeler
- Ben Corbett as 'Red' McGee
- Chet Ryan as Sheriff Breen
- Jane Fosher as Mrs. Brownlee
- Floyd Anderson as Dan McFee
- W.S. Weatherwax as Bill Jackson
- John Judd as Chief of the Rurales
- Earl Simpson as Pete
- Earl Dwire as Dave Butler

== Bibliography ==
- Munden, Kenneth White. The American Film Institute Catalog of Motion Pictures Produced in the United States, Part 1. University of California Press, 1997.
