= Lure of the Gold =

1922 film

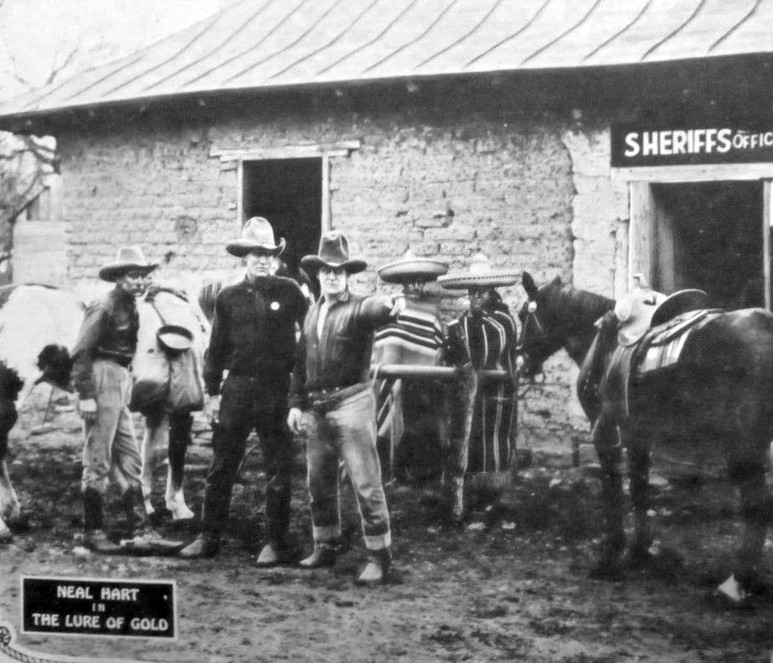
- Lobby card
- Directed by: Neal Hart
- Written by: Neal Hart (story, scenario)
- Produced by: Neal Hart
- Starring: Neal Hart
- Cinematography: Jacob A. Badaracco
- Distributed by: William Steiner Distribution Company
- Release date: March 1922
- Running time: 54 minutes
- Country: United States
- Languages: Silent; English intertitles

Lure of the Gold is a 1922 American silent Western film directed by and starring Neal Hart.

== Cast ==
- Neal Hart as Jack Austin
- Hazel Deane as The Singer
- William Quinn as Chuck Wallace
- Ben Corbett as Latigo Bob

== Preservation ==
The Lure of the Gold survives in the Library of Congress.
