= The Man from Montana =

The Man From Montana
- Directed by: George Marshall
- Starring: Neal Hart
- Distributed by: Universal Film Manufacturing Company
- Release date: November 19, 1917
- Running time: 50 mins.
- Country: United States
- Language: Silent (English intertitles)

The Man From Montana is a 1917 silent black and white film directed by George Marshall. It stars Neal Hart and George Berrell. It is not known whether the film currently survives, which suggests that it is a lost film. The film should not be confused with the 1941 film Man from Montana.

== Plot ==
As described in a film magazine, Warren Summers (Peil) and his wife (Lamb) along with their pretty relative Meta Cooper (Rich) go to the town of Green Water to purchase the Bumble Bee mine, which is owned by Duke Fairley (Hart) and Dad Petzel (Berrell). While Duke is out of town Dad sells the mine, receiving worthless stock for it. Duke then heads east to find the swindlers and to see Meta again. Meanwhile, Dad and the boys work an abandoned mine called "The Worm" and strike it rich. Unable to get in touch with Duke, they head east to give him the good news. They end up at the New York docks where they are shanghaied. Duke accompanies Meta across the state line so that she can deliver some stocks for Summers, and Duke is then arrested for taking a girl out of state. Returning to New York, Duke marries Meta which angers Summers and his gang. They kidnap Meta and tell Duke to meet them at a certain hour on the docks and bring a large sum of money to exchange for Meta. Duke goes to the docks but is shanghaied and put on the same boat as Dad and the boys. When they recover, they tell each other of their troubles, and then convince the seamen to take them back to shore. Duke arrives in time to rescue Meta from her crafty relatives, which are then turned over to the law.

== Cast ==
- Neal Hart as Duke Fairley
- George Berrell as Dad Petzel
- Edward Peil Sr. as Warren Summers
- Betty Lamb as Mrs. Summers
- Willard Wayne as Allen Spencer
- Vivian Rich as Meta Cooper

== Reception ==
Like many American films of the time, The Man from Montana was subject to cuts by city and state film censorship boards. The Chicago Board of Censors required cuts in Reel 1 of the intertitles "We're after men who take girls across the state line" and "Strong, I'm going to force you to make a settlement"; Reel 2, scene of the woman taking money from her sister's purse and two automobile holdup scenes; Reel 3, the intertitles "Ignorant of the fact that Caretown is across the state line" and "Across the state line"; and Reel 5, the letter stating "If you want to see your wife bring $50 to Pier 66", the intertitle "Here's $50 to shanghai him", and the attack on a man, robbing him and carrying him aboard ship, and the closeup of slugging man with fist.
