= Towed in a Hole =

1932 film

- Directed by: George Marshall
- Produced by: Hal Roach
- Starring: Stan Laurel; Oliver Hardy; Billy Gilbert
- Cinematography: Art Lloyd
- Edited by: Richard C. Currier
- Music by: Leroy Shield
- Distributed by: Metro-Goldwyn-Mayer
- Release date: December 31, 1932
- Running time: 21:02
- Country: United States
- Language: English

Towed in a Hole is a 1932 pre-Code comedy film starring Laurel and Hardy. The "two-reeler" short was produced by Hal Roach, directed by George Marshall, and distributed by Metro-Goldwyn-Mayer.

== Plot ==
Stan and Ollie make a modest livelihood selling fish from their truck. During their rounds, Stan proposes that they enhance their earnings by catching the fish themselves. Despite Stan's muddled explanation of the plan, Ollie likes the idea of cutting out the "middleman".

The pair purchase a dilapidated boat for their fishing venture and test it for leaks by filling it with water. Ollie's earnest attempts at repair are marred by Stan's bungling, which includes dropping an anchor through the hull and sawing through the mast, resulting in Stan's imprisonment below deck after a physical altercation that leaves him with a black eye.

Once the repairs are completed, Stan and Ollie endeavor to tow the boat with their car, resulting in a calamitous collision. Despite the wreckage, Stan's discovery of his intact fish horn amidst the debris prompts a semblance of optimism, albeit short-lived, as Ollie chases Stan in frustration.

== Cast ==
- Stan Laurel as Stanley
- Oliver Hardy as Ollie
- Billy Gilbert as Joe, the junkyard owner

== Production notes ==
Towed in a Hole was remade by The Three Stooges in 1945 as Booby Dupes.
