= White Eagle (1922 serial) =

1922 film

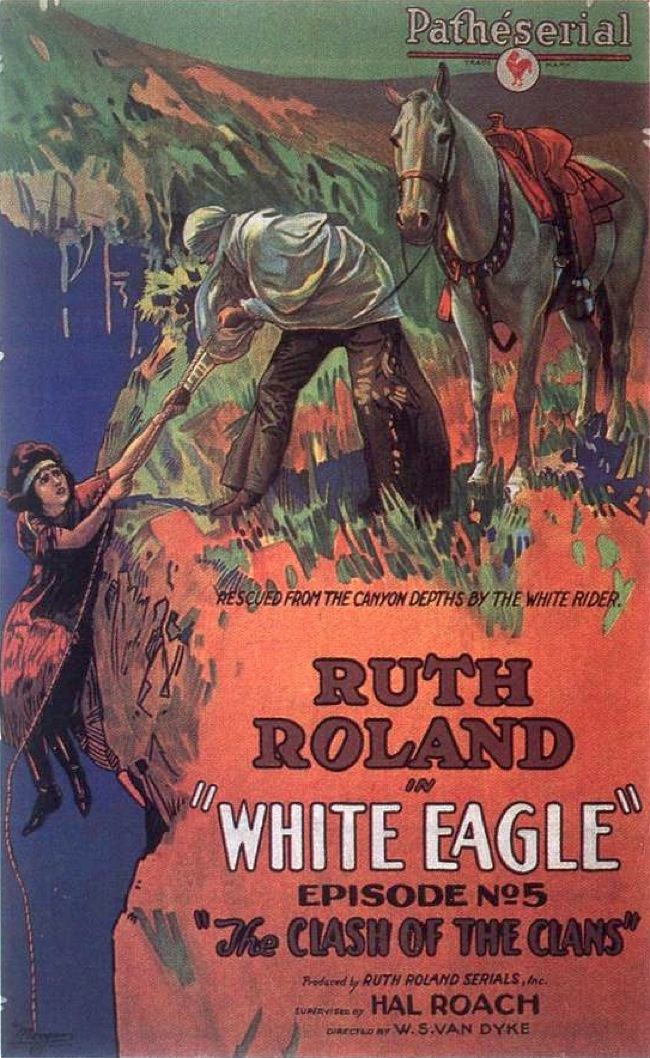
- A poster for episode number 5.
- Directed by: Fred Jackman; W. S. Van Dyke
- Written by: Carl Krusada (as Val Cleveland)
- Story by: Ruth Roland
- Produced by: Hal Roach
- Starring: Ruth Roland; Earl Metcalfe
- Edited by: Richard C. Currier
- Distributed by: Pathé Exchange
- Release date: January 1, 1922
- Running time: 15 episodes
- Country: United States
- Languages: Silent; English intertitles

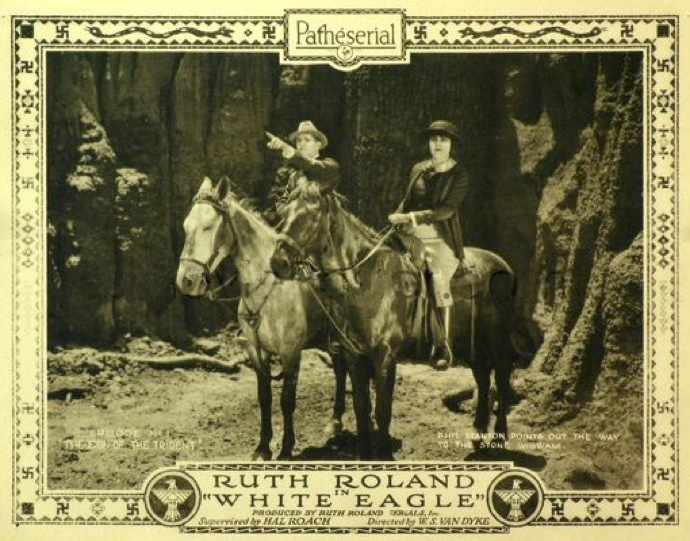
Lobby card.

White Eagle is a 1922 American silent Western film serial directed by Fred Jackman and W. S. Van Dyke. The film is considered to be lost. White Eagle is almost a remake of the earlier Ruth Roland serial Hands Up The serial features a famous scene of Ruth Roland climbing a rope ladder from a moving train to a plane flying overhead.

== Cast ==
- Ruth Roland as Ruth Randolph
- Earl Metcalfe as Phil Stanton
- Harry Girard as Jim Loomis
- Virginia Ainsworth as Julia Wells
- Otto Lederer as Gray Wolf
- Bud Osborne as Standing Bear
- Frank Lackteen as Crouching Mole
- Gertrude Douglas as Moonlight
- Louise Emmons as Stone Ear
- Frank Valrose as Feather Foot
- Chick Morrison as Bill Henley
- Anita Nara

== Episodes ==
The serial consisted of fifteen two reel episodes, two of which were entitled "The Clash of the Clans."

1. The Sign of the Trident
2. The Red Men's Menace
3. A Strange Message
4. The Lost Trail
5. The Clash of the Clans
6. The Trap
7. The Mysterious Voyage
8. The Island of Terror
9. The Flaming Arrow
10. The Cave of Peril
11. Danger Rails
12. Win or Lose
13. The Clash of the Clans
14. The Pivoted Rock
15. The Golden Pool

== See also ==
- List of film serials
- List of film serials by studio
