= Dark Purpose =

1964 film by George Marshall

- Directed by: George Marshall
- Written by: Massimo D'Avak; David P. Harmon; Doris Hume Kilburn
- Produced by: Steve Barclay
- Starring: Shirley Jones; Rossano Brazzi; George Sanders
- Cinematography: Gábor Pogány
- Music by: Angelo Francesco Lavagnino
- Distributed by: Universal Pictures
- Release date: April 3, 1964
- Running time: 97 minutes
- Country: United States
- Language: English

Dark Purpose is a 1964 American drama film directed by George Marshall and starring Shirley Jones, Rossano Brazzi, and George Sanders.

== Plot ==
American secretary Karen Williams travels to Italy with her employer, art appraiser Raymond Fountaine, to assess the valuable collection of Count Paolo Barbarelli at his villa overlooking the sea.

The count lives there with Cora, a young woman suffering from memory loss, whom he claims to have taken in like a daughter after her skiing accident. Karen falls in love with the count, but Cora wants her gone. She later confides to Karen that she is not Paolo's daughter but his wife. He is slowly poisoning her so he ultimately can inherit her family's money, Cora says, but Karen isn't sure whether to believe her story.

Cora is found dead. The police believe it to be a suicide, but evidence at the scene leads Karen to believe that Paolo was indeed responsible for the young woman's death. It leads to a confrontation and violent struggle. A vicious watchdog tries to protect his master, but instead knocks Paolo into a fountain, where he drowns.

== Cast ==
- Shirley Jones as Karen Williams
- Rossano Brazzi as Count Paolo Barbarelli
- George Sanders as Raymond Fountaine
- Giorgia Moll as Cora Barbarelli
- Micheline Presle as Monique Bouvier
- Emma Baron as Gregoria
- Mathilda Calnan as Mrs. Thompson
- Fanfulla as The Florist
- Charles Fawcett as Martin
