= Man from Montana =

1941 film

- Theatrical release poster
- Directed by: Ray Taylor
- Screenplay by: Bennett Cohen
- Produced by: Will Cowan
- Starring: Johnny Mack Brown; Fuzzy Knight; Billy Lenhart; Kenneth Brown; Jean Brooks; Nell O'Day
- Cinematography: Charles Van Enger
- Edited by: Paul Landres
- Production company: Universal Pictures
- Distributed by: Universal Pictures
- Release date: September 5, 1941
- Running time: 59 minutes
- Country: United States
- Language: English

Man from Montana is a 1941 American Western film directed by Ray Taylor and written by Bennett Cohen. The film stars Johnny Mack Brown, Fuzzy Knight, Billy Lenhart, Kenneth Brown, Jean Brooks and Nell O'Day. The film was released on September 5, 1941, by Universal Pictures. This movie should not be confused with the 1917 silent movie called The Man from Montana.

== Cast ==
- Johnny Mack Brown as Bob Dawson
- Fuzzy Knight as Grubby
- Billy Lenhart as Butch
- Kenneth Brown as Buddy
- Jean Brooks as Linda Thompson
- Nell O'Day as Sally Preston
- William Gould as Winchester Thompson
- James Blaine as Sam Dunham
- Richard Alexander as Del Kohler
- Karl Hackett as Flash Watson aka Trig
- Edmund Cobb as Dakota
- Frank Ellis as Decker
- Kermit Maynard as Chris
- Jack Shannon as Tex
- Murdock MacQuarrie as Joel Preston
- Charles McMurphy as Dugan
