= Reno (1930 film) =

1930 film

- Lobby card
- Directed by: George J. Crone
- Written by: Harry Chandlee(adapt./dialogue); Douglas W. Churchill(adapt./dialogue)
- Based on: Reno (1929 novel) by Cornelius Vanderbilt Jr.
- Produced by: George W. Weeks
- Starring: Ruth Roland; Montagu Love
- Distributed by: Sono Art-World Wide Pictures
- Release date: October 1, 1930
- Running time: 65 minutes; 8 reels
- Country: United States
- Languages: Sound (All-Talking); English

Reno is a 1930 American pre-Code all-talking sound drama film directed by George J. Crone and starring silent serial queen Ruth Roland. It was produced and distributed by early sound era production studio Sono Art-World Wide Pictures. Roland's sound film debut, she would follow up with only one more talkie.

== Cast ==
- Ruth Roland as Felecia Brett
- Montague Love as Alexander W. Brett
- Kenneth Thomson as Richard Belden
- Sam Hardy as J. B. Berkley
- Alyce McCormick as Ann Hodge
- Edward Hearn as Tom Hodge
- Doris Lloyd as Lola Fealey
- Judith Vosselli as Rita Rogers
- Virginia Ainsworth as Marie
- Beulah Monroe as Mrs. Martin
- Douglas Scott as Bobby Brett
- Emmett King as Judge Cooper
- Henry Hall as Prosecuting Attorney
- Gayne Whitman as Defending Attorney

== Music ==
The film featured a theme song entitled "As Long As We're Together" with words and music by Ben Bard and Leslie Barton.
