= Prairie Trails =

1920 film

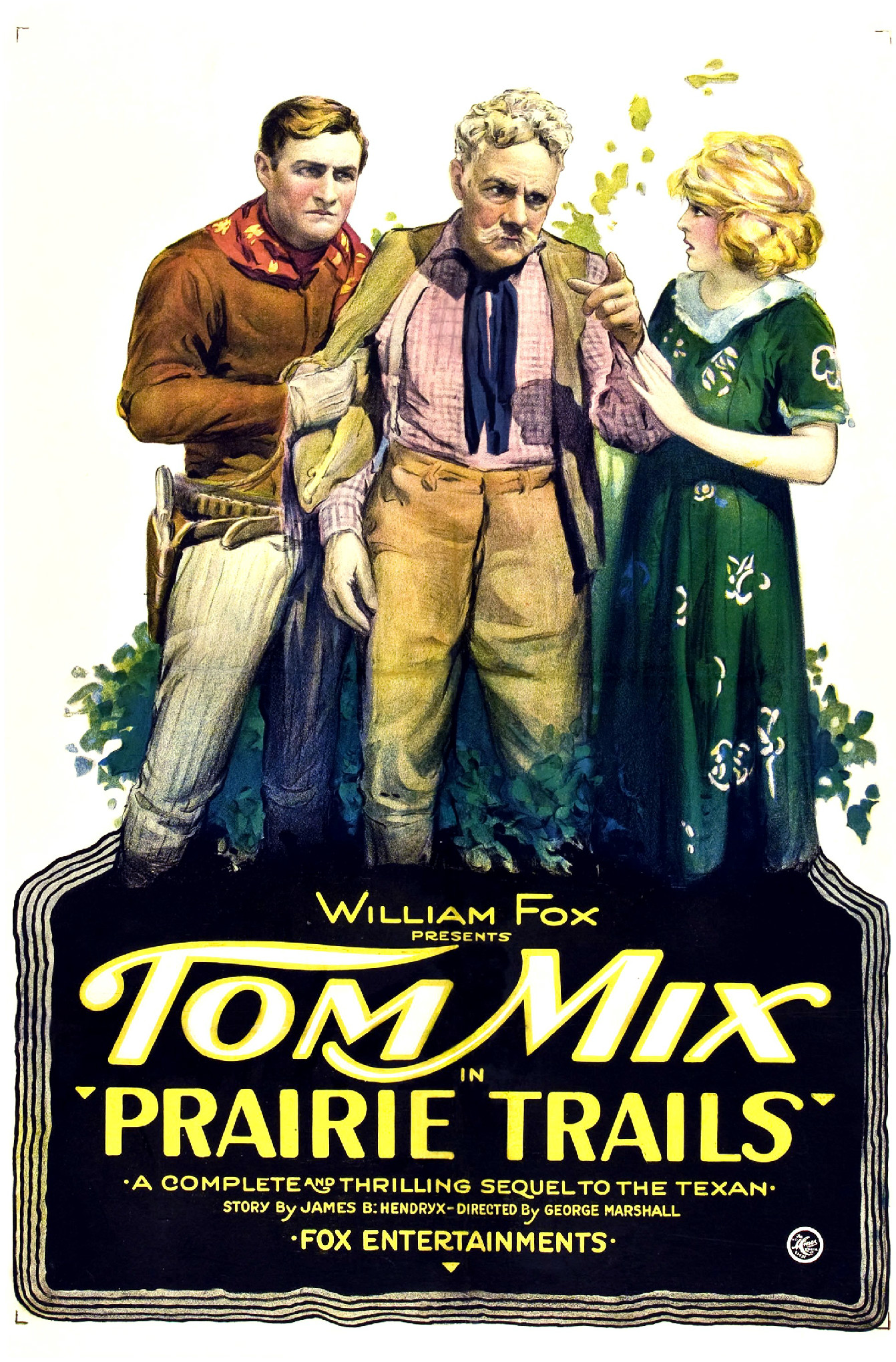
- Theatrical poster
- Directed by: George Marshall; George H. Webster (ass't director)
- Written by: Frank Howard Clark; James B. Hendryx
- Produced by: William Fox
- Starring: Tom Mix
- Cinematography: Frank B. Good
- Distributed by: Fox Films
- Release date: December 26, 1920
- Running time: 5 reels
- Country: United States
- Languages: Silent; English intertitles

Prairie Trails is a lost 1920 American silent comedy Western film directed by George Marshall and starring Tom Mix.

== Cast ==
- Tom Mix as Tex Benton
- Charles K. French as Stephen McWhorter
- Kathleen O'Connor as Janet McWhorter
- Robert Walker as Winthrop Adams Endicott
- Gloria Hope as Alice Endicott
- Sid Jordan as Jack Purdy
- Harry Dunkinson as Ike Stork
- William Elmer as Rod Blake
