= Cupid Angling =

1918 film

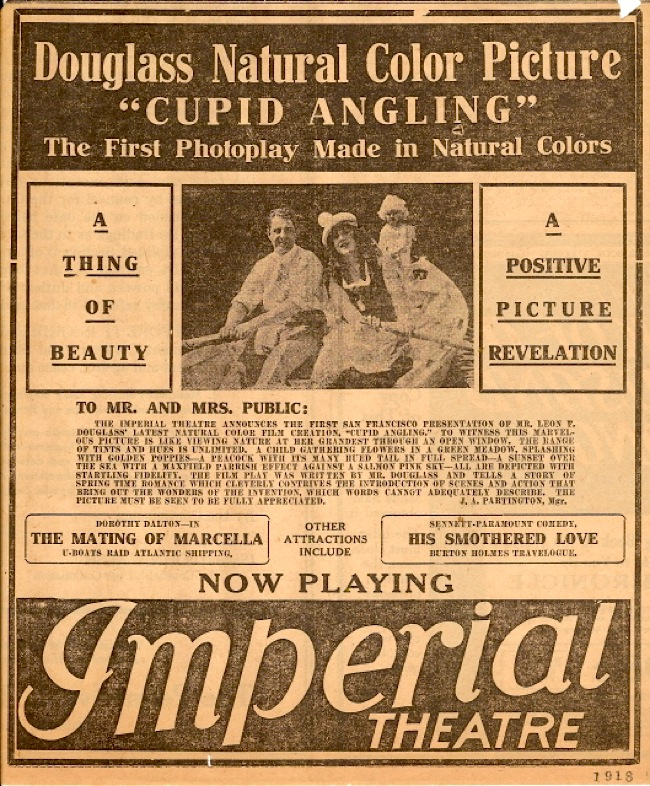
- Advertisement
- Directed by: Louis W. Chaudet
- Written by: Leon Forest Douglass
- Produced by: Leon Forest Douglass
- Starring: Ruth Roland; Albert Morrison
- Cinematography: Robert L. Carson
- Production company: Douglass National Color Film Company
- Distributed by: W. W. Hodkinson
- Release date: September 9, 1918
- Country: United States
- Language: Silent (English Intertitles)

Cupid Angling is a 1918 American silent film starring Ruth Roland, and is the only feature film photographed using the Douglass Natural Color process.

The film was produced by Leon F. Douglass's National Color Film Company in the Lake Lagunitas area of Marin County, California, and was made in the Douglass Natural Color process. Douglass was also a partner in the founding of the Victor Talking Machine Company.

The film stars Ruth Roland and Albert Morrison, and has walk-on appearances by Mary Pickford and Douglas Fairbanks.

This film is now considered a lost film.

== See also ==
- List of early color feature films
