= The Adventures of Ruth =

1919 film

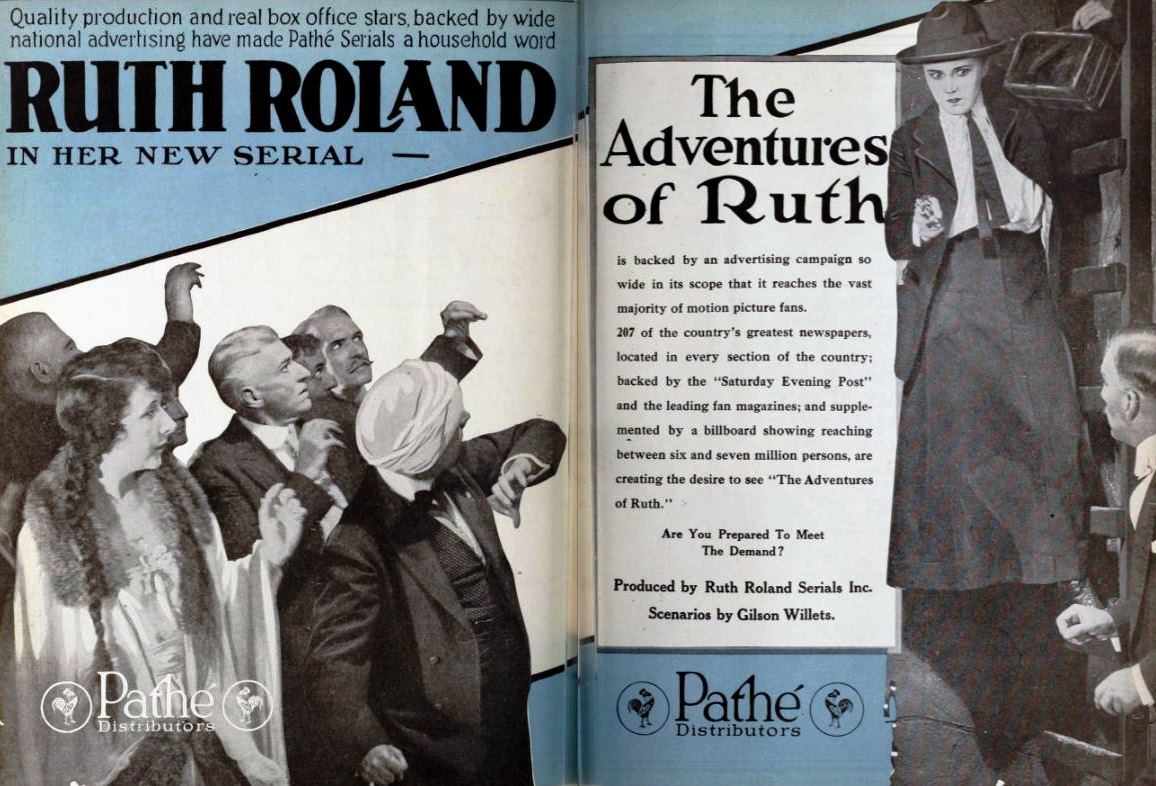
- Advertisement in Exhibitors Herald
- Directed by: George Marshall
- Written by: Gilson Willets
- Story by: Ruth Roland
- Produced by: Ruth Roland
- Starring: Ruth Roland; Herbert Heyes
- Production company: Ruth Roland Serials
- Distributed by: Pathé Exchange; Astra Films
- Release date: December 28, 1919
- Running time: 15 episodes
- Country: United States
- Language: Silent (English intertitles)

The Adventures of Ruth is a 1919 American film serial directed by George Marshall. It is now considered to be a lost film. The serial was advertised as written, produced and directed by Ruth Roland. Roland was the producer, but it was written by Gilson Willets and directed by George Marshall.

== Plot ==
As described in a film magazine, Daniel Robin has become mixed up with a band of criminals known as "the 13," and is shot when he refuses to do their bidding. His daughter Ruth, brought home from boarding school, reaches his bedside before he expires. He tells her that she will be given thirteen keys. Instructions will be provided with each key and, if she follows the instructions, she will eventually fully learn of her birthright. Many adventures then follow as Ruth attempts to solve the puzzle of each key and establish her true birthright.

== Cast ==
- Ruth Roland as Ruth Robin
- Herbert Heyes as Bob Wright (credited as Herbert Hayes)
- Thomas G. Lingham as LaFarge, "The Hound"
- William Human as Paul Brighton
- Charles Bennett as Wayman
- Helen Case as Countess Zirka
- Helen Deliane as Melody Morne
- Charles Belcher
- George Larkin

== Episodes ==
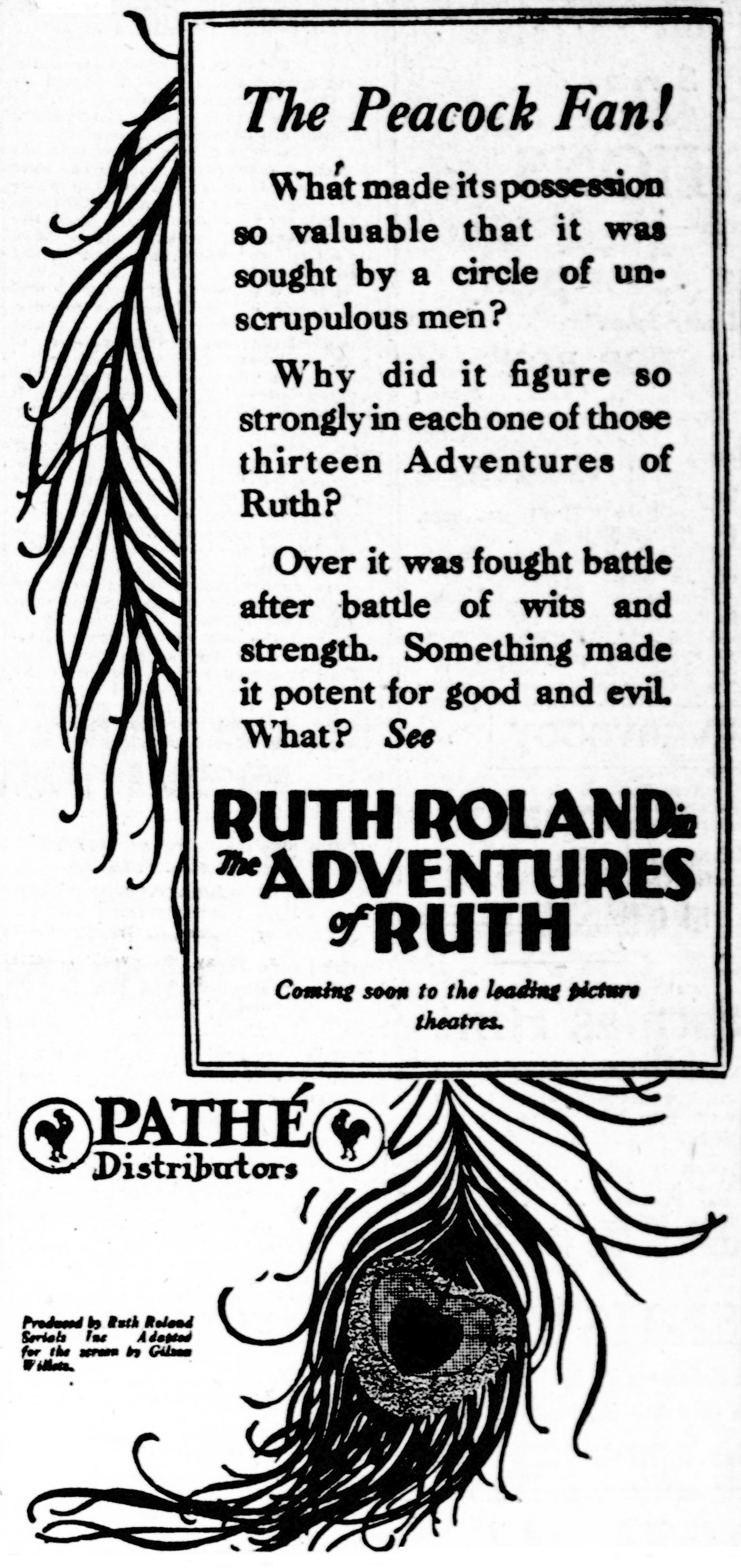
Newspaper advertisement

1. The Wrong Countess
2. The Celestial Maiden
3. The Bewitching Spy
4. The Stolen Picture
5. The Bank Robbery
6. The Border Fury
7. The Substitute Messenger
8. The Harem Model
9. The Cellar Gangsters
10. The Forged Check
11. The Trap
12. The Vault of Terror
13. Within Hollow Walls
14. The Fighting Chance
15. The Key To Victory
