= Ruth Roland =

American actress (1892–1937)

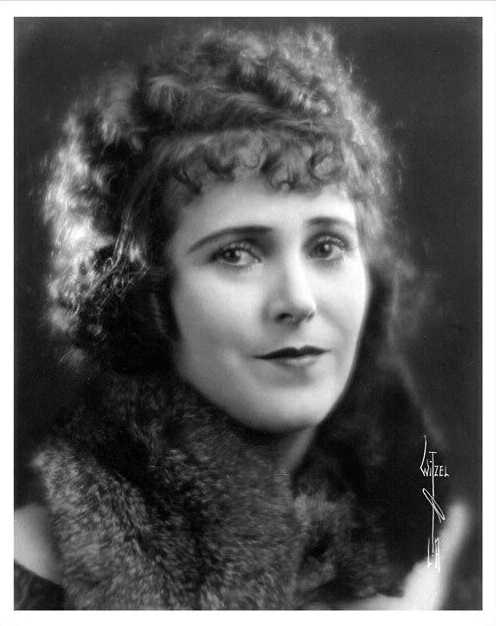
- Photographic portrait, c. 1920
- Born: August 26, 1892; San Francisco, California, U.S.
- Died: September 22, 1937 (aged 45); Hollywood, Los Angeles, California, U.S.
- Occupations: Actress, producer
- Years active: 1911–1936
- Spouses: Lionel T. Kent (m. 1917; div. 1919) Ben Bard (m. 1929)

Ruth Roland (August 26, 1892 – September 22, 1937) was an American stage and film actress and film producer.

== Early life and career ==
Roland was born in San Francisco, California to Elizabeth Lillian Hauser and Jack Roland. Her father managed a theatre, and she became a child actress who went on to work in vaudeville. At age 12, she was the youngest student at Hollywood High School, having attended the school around 1904 or 1905 (there is debate on this date). Roland was Hollywood High School's first homegrown movie star.

She was hired by director Sidney Olcott who had seen her on stage in New York City. She appeared in her first film, A Chance Shot, for Kalem Studios in 1911, becoming the leading actress of their new West Coast studio.

Roland left Kalem and went on to even more fame at Balboa Films, where she was under contract from 1914 to 1917. In 1915 she appeared in a 14-episode adventure film serial titled The Red Circle. A shrewd businessperson, she established her own production company, Ruth Roland Serials, and signed a distribution deal with Pathé to make seven new multi-episode serials that proved very successful.

Between 1909 and 1927, Roland appeared in more than 200 films. She appeared in an early color feature film Cupid Angling (1918) made in the Natural Color process invented by Leon F. Douglass, and filmed in the Lake Lagunitas area of Marin County, California.

Roland worked the film business until 1930 when she made her first talkie. Although her voice worked well enough on screen, now entering her forties she returned to performing in live theatre, making only one more film appearance in 1936.

== Personal life and death ==
Roland was married to Lionel T. Kent on May 16, 1917. The marriage was short-lived: they separated on September 2, 1918, and divorced on April 2, 1919.

On February 14, 1929, she married fellow actor Ben Bard, who also had a stage acting background, and ran a Hollywood acting school after they married. They were together until Roland's death. Ruth Roland died of cancer in 1937, aged 45, in Hollywood and is interred near her husband in the Forest Lawn Memorial Park Cemetery in Glendale, California.

For her contribution to the motion picture industry, Ruth Roland received a star on the Hollywood Walk of Fame at 6220 Hollywood Boulevard on February 8, 1960. In 1979, a concrete box containing Roland's personal film collection was discovered buried in the backyard of Roland's house, and donated to the UCLA Film Archives by her heirs in 1980.

== Selected filmography ==
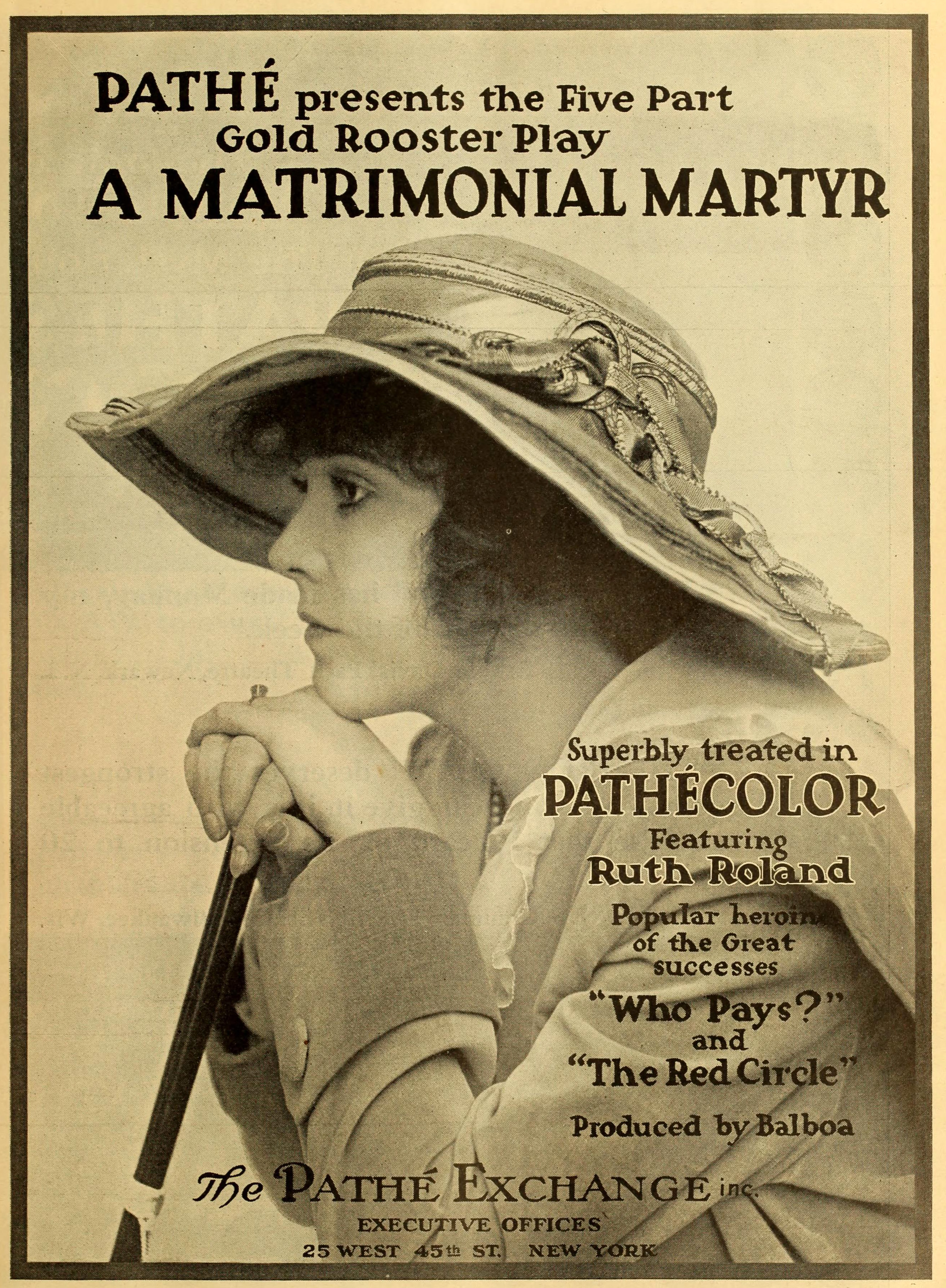
A Matrimonial Martyr (1916)

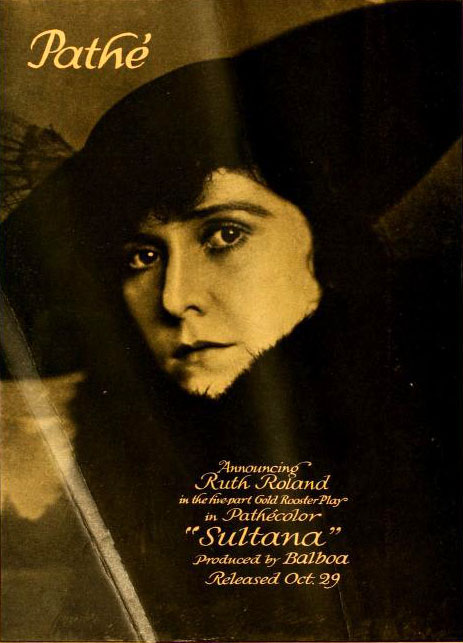
The Sultana (1916)

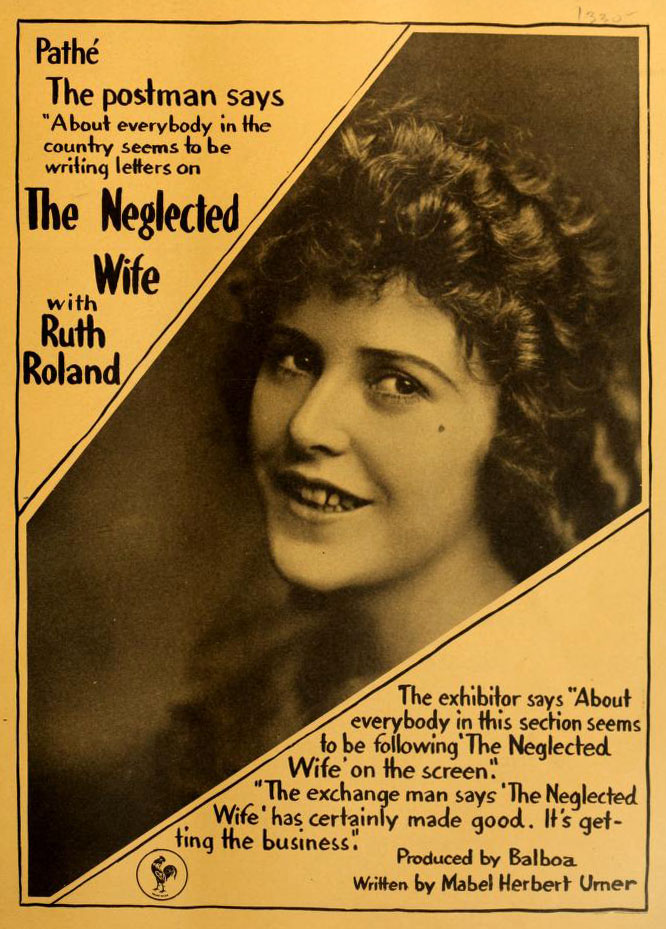
The Neglected Wife (1917)

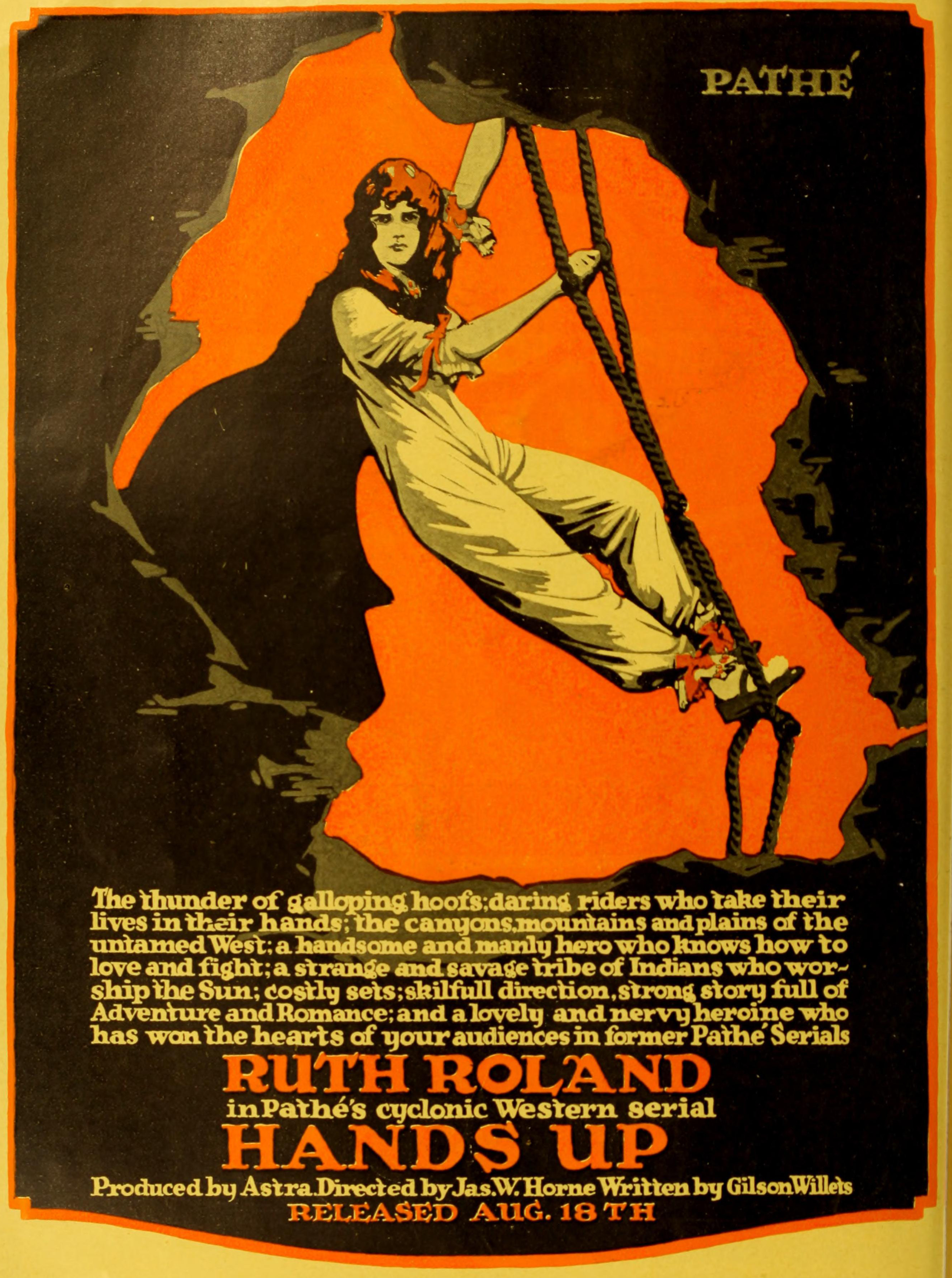
Hands Up (1918)

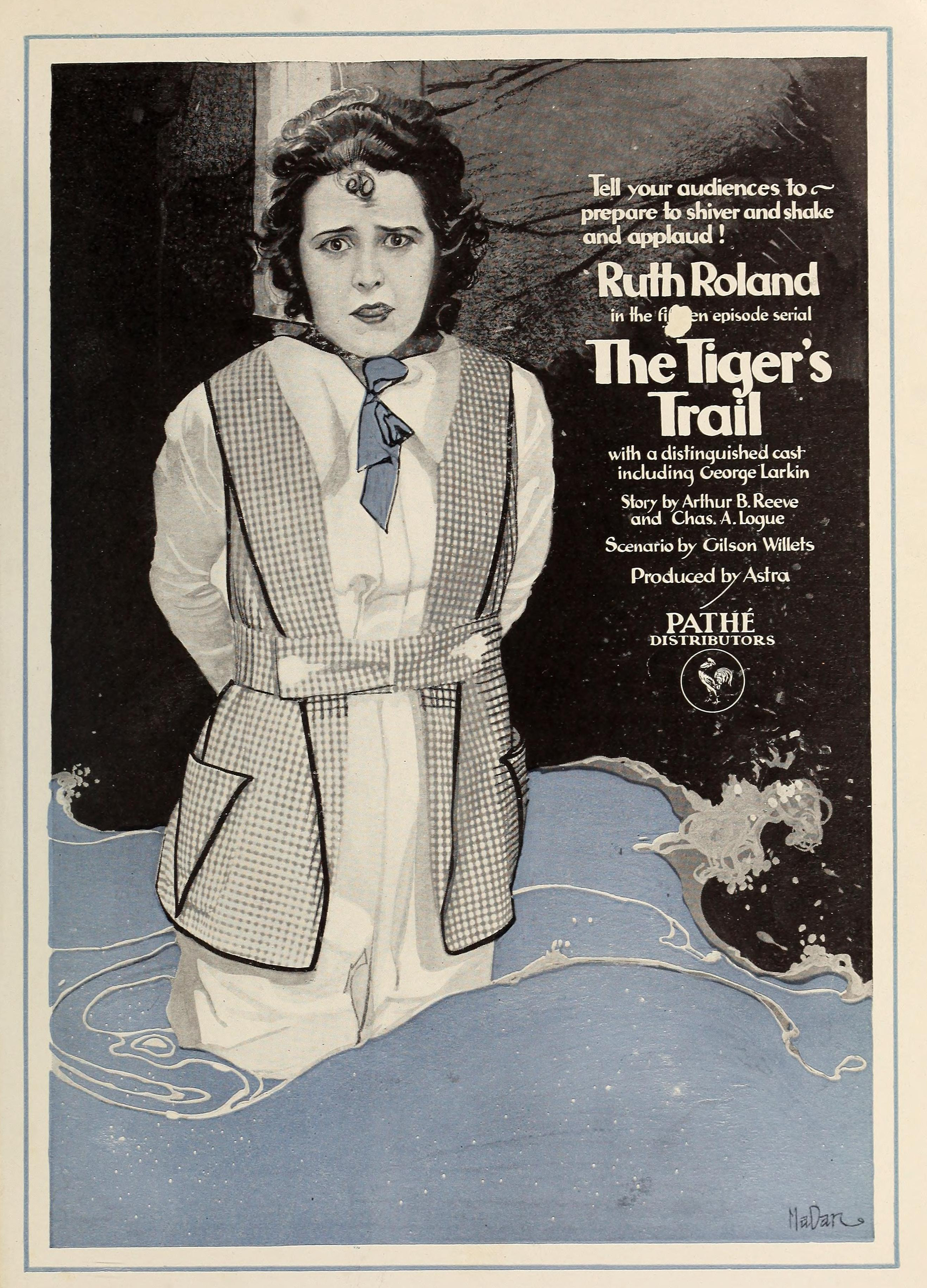
The Tiger's Trail (1919)

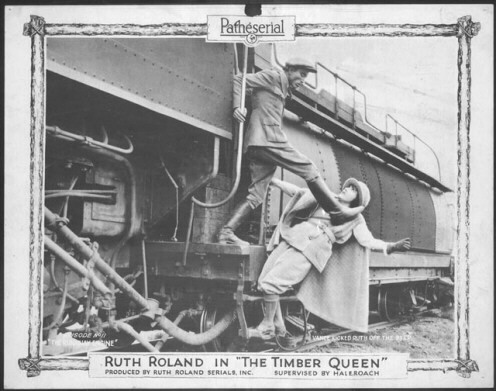
The Timber Queen (1922)

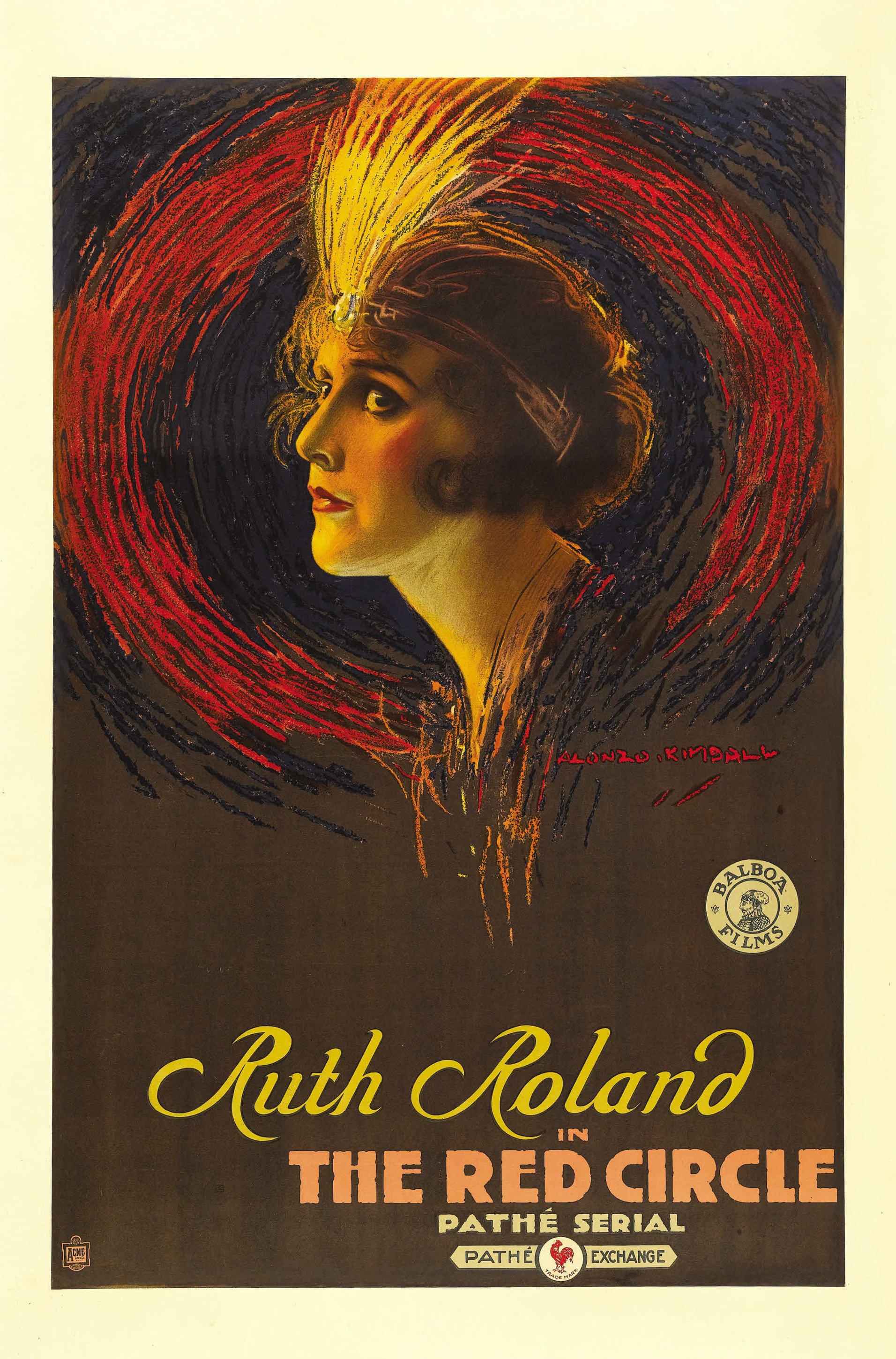
The Red Circle serial (1915), Roland's portrait by Alonzo Myron Kimball

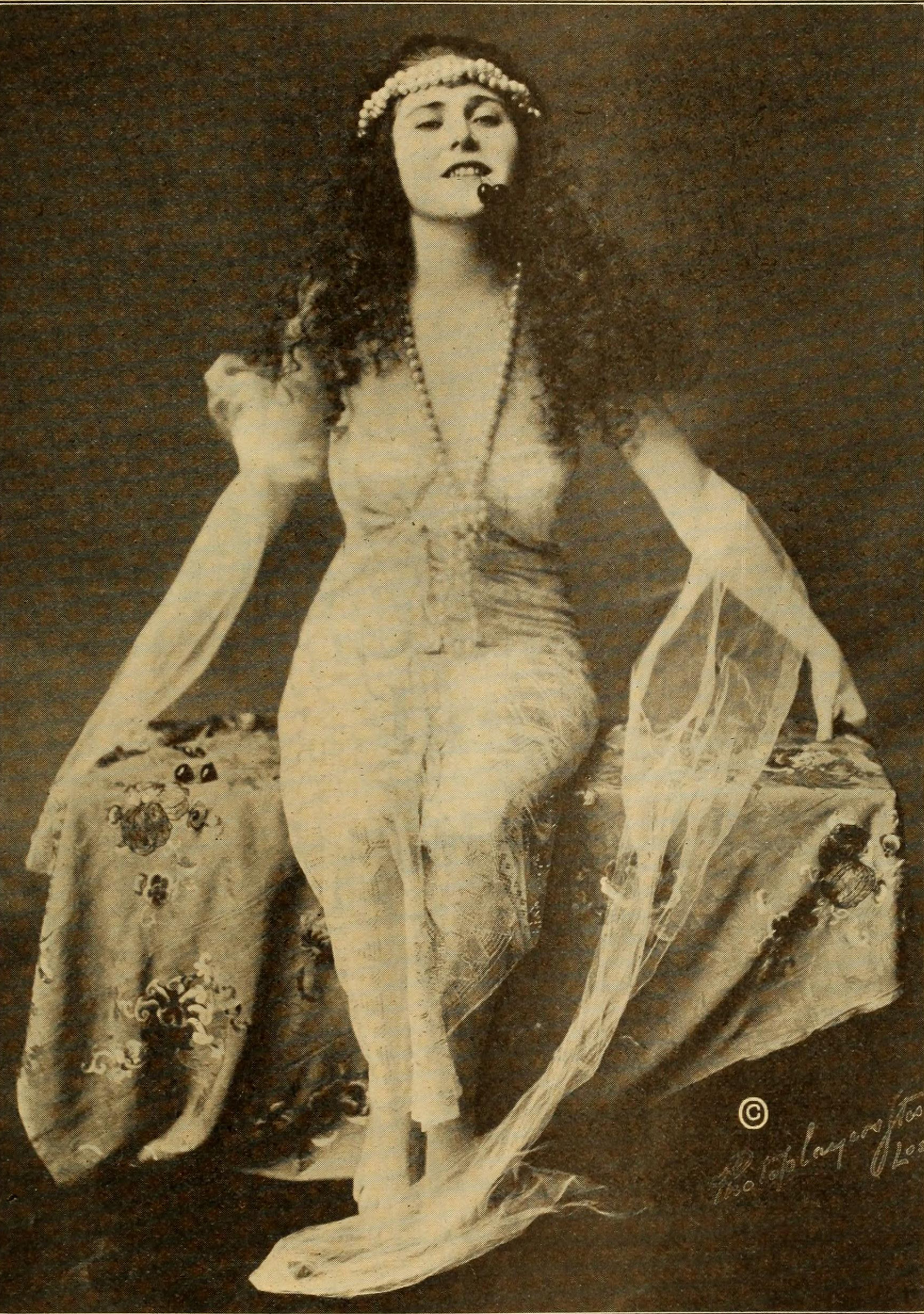
Roland in 1916

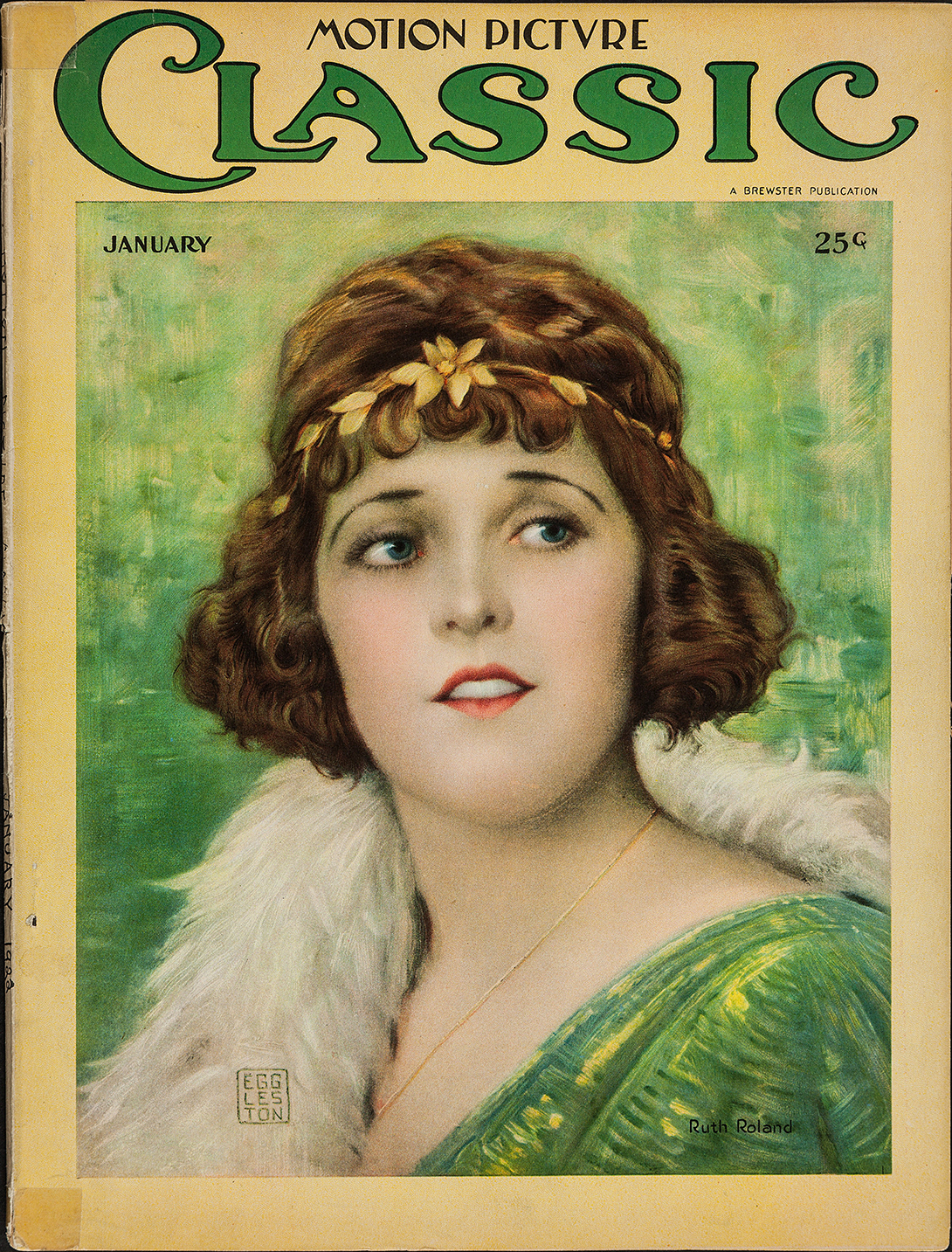
Roland portrait by Benjamin Eggleston, Motion Picture Classic, January 1922

- A Chance Shot (1911)
- He Who Laughs Last (1911)
- Ruth Roland, the Kalem Girl (1912)
- Pulque Pete and the Opera Troupe (1912)
- The Girl Bandits' Hoodoo (1912)
- The Raiders from Double L Ranch (1913)
- The Sheriff of Stone Gulch (1913)
- Gertie Gets the Cash (1914)
- The Deadly Battle at Hicksville (1914)
- The Pursuit of Pleasure (1915)
- The Girl Detective (1915)
- Who Pays? (1915)
- The Red Circle (1915)
- Comrade John (1915)
- A Matrimonial Martyr (1916)
- The Sultana (1916)
- The Devil's Bait (1917)
- The Neglected Wife (1917)
- The Fringe of Society (1917)
- Hands Up (1918)
- Cupid Angling (1918)
- The Tiger's Trail (1919)
- The Adventures of Ruth (1919)
- Ruth of the Rockies (1920)
- The Avenging Arrow (1921)
- White Eagle (1922)
- The Timber Queen (1922)
- Haunted Valley (1923)
- Ruth of the Range (1923)
- Dollar Down (1925)
- Where the Worst Begins (1925)
- The Masked Woman (1927)
- Reno (1930)
- From Nine to Nine (1936)

== Bibliography ==
- Balboa Films – A History and Filmography of the Silent Film Studio ISBN 0-7864-0496-5
