= Neal Hart =

American actor

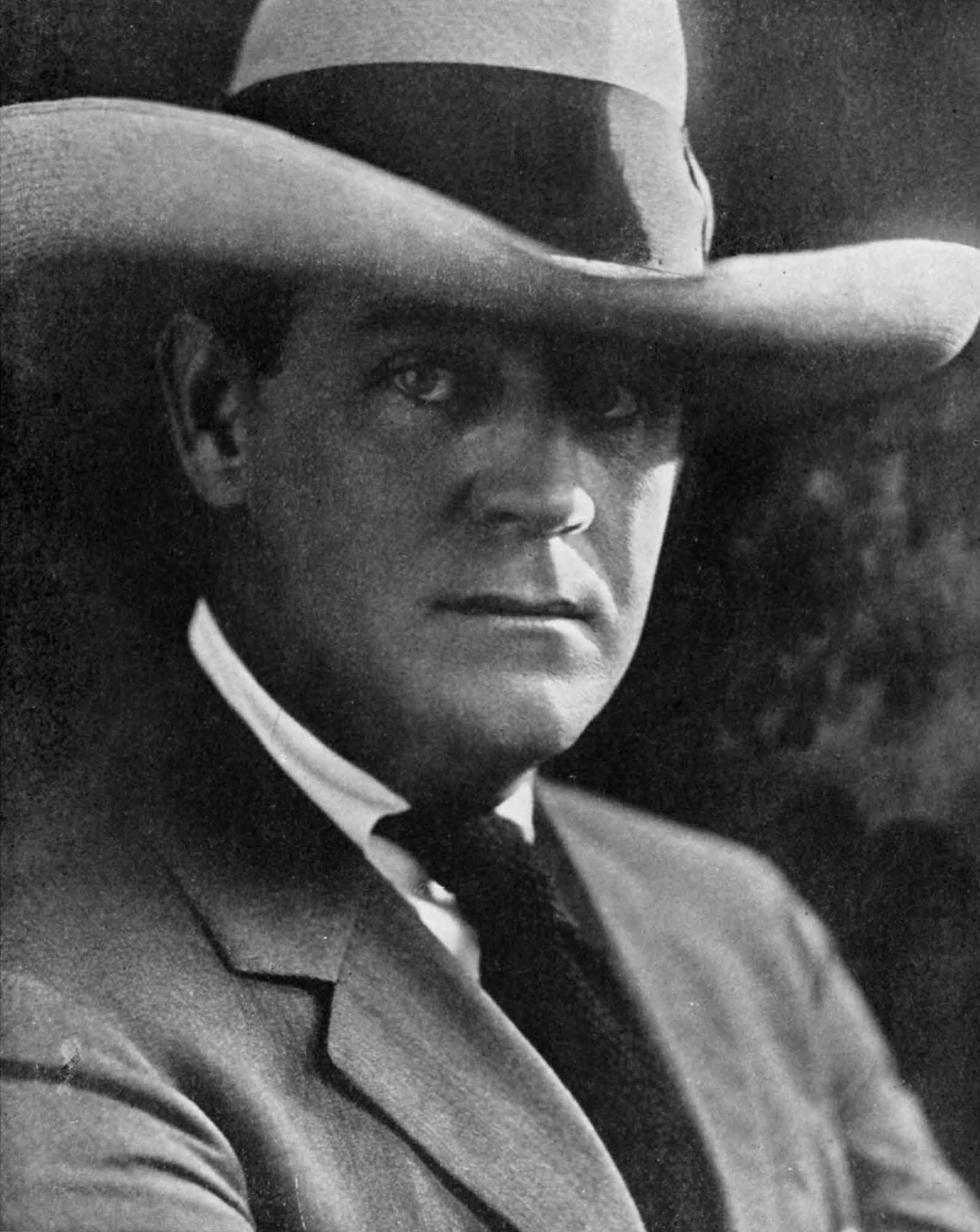
- Hart in 1920
- Born: April 7, 1879; Staten Island, New York, U.S.
- Died: April 2, 1949 (aged 69); Los Angeles, California, U.S.
- Burial place: Holy Cross Cemetery
- Occupations: Actor; Film director
- Years active: 1916-1949

Tangled Trails

Neal Hart (April 7, 1879 – April 2, 1949) was an American actor and director of the silent film era.

== Biography ==
Hart was born in Staten Island, New York. Before he began working in films, he was a city marshal, cowboy, and stage driver. He worked in entertainment as a member of a Wild West show.

Hart appeared in 125 films between 1916 and 1949. He also directed 23 films between 1919 and 1928. Until 1920 he worked at Universal Pictures as an actor, an assistant to director George Marshall, and a scenario writer. He went from Universal to Pinnacle Studios in 1920, adding producing to his writing and acting as he continued to work in Western films through the 1920s.

On April 2, 1949, Hart died at the Motion Picture Country Hospital in Woodland Hills, Los Angeles, and was buried at the Holy Cross Cemetery. He was a distant cousin of western actor William S. Hart, who is buried in Greenwood Cemetery in Brooklyn, New York City.

== Partial filmography ==
- Stampede in the Night (1916 short)
- The Night Riders (1916 short)
- The Passing of Hell's Crown (1916 short)
- The Committee on Credentials (1916 short)
- For the Love of a Girl (1916 short)
- Love's Lariat (1916)
- Liberty (1916 serial)
- The Man from Montana (1917)
- The Mystery Ship (1917)
- The Lion's Claws (1918)
- Smashing Through (1918)
- The Crow (1919)
- Tangled Trails (1921)
- The Kingfisher's Roost (1921)
- Lure of the Gold (1922)
- Trigger Tricks (1930)
- Wild Horse (1931)
- Guns for Hire (1932)
- The Reckless Rider (1932)
- The Dude Bandit (1933)
- The Renegade Ranger (1938)
- Tucson Raiders (1944) (uncredited)
- Marshal of Reno (1944) (uncredited)
- Cheyenne Wildcat (1944) (uncredited)
- Phantom of the Plains (1945) (uncredited)
- Badman's Territory (1946) (uncredited)
