= Leon Douglass =

American inventor and film maker

Leon Forrest Douglass
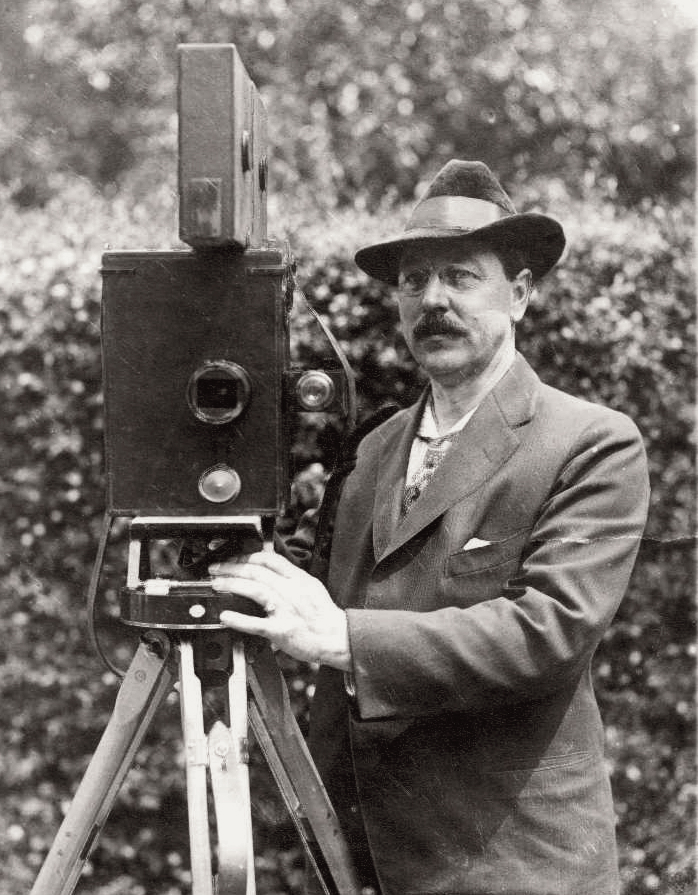
- Born: March 12, 1869; Nebraska, USA
- Died: September 7, 1940 (aged 71); San Francisco, USA
- Occupations: Inventor, Businessman
- Known for: Inventor
- Spouse: Victoria Adams
- Children: Leon Forrest, Dorothy Victoria, Earl Seymour, Eldridge Adams, Ena Lucile, Florence Carol

Leon Forrest Douglass (March 12, 1869 – September 7, 1940) was an American inventor and co-founder of the Victor Talking Machine Company who registered approximately fifty patents, mostly for film and sound recording techniques.

== Life and professional career ==
Douglass was born in rural Nebraska, near present-day Syracuse. His parents were Seymour James Douglass, a millwright and carpenter, and Mate (Fuller) Douglass. He attended grammar school in Lincoln, Nebraska, was apprenticed to a printer, at eleven was working as a telegraph messenger, and by seventeen was telephone exchange manager for the Nebraska Telephone Company in Seward.

=== Phonograph ===
In 1888, Douglass saw a phonograph for the first time and was fascinated. He made his own and took it to Omaha to show it to E.A. Benson, president of the Nebraska Phonograph Co., who hired him as the company’s agent for the western part of the state. In 1889 he invented a nickel-in-the-slot attachment for the phonograph. Benson paid $500 for the patent and promoted Douglass to a job with the Chicago Central Phonograph Company, which he also owned and that was part of the Thomas Edison-affiliated North American Phonograph Company, distributor for the Edison Phonograph. In the early 1890s Douglass invented a machine for duplicating phonograph cylinders and became known as "Duplicate Doug." He sold this patent to Edward Easton, director of the American Graphophone Company and president of the Columbia Phonograph Company, moved to Washington D.C. and worked for Easton briefly before returning to the Chicago Central Phonograph Company as a manager in 1892. He was elected vice president and treasurer, and secured a concession for a hundred slot phonographs at the World's Columbian Exposition, better known as the 1893 Chicago World's Fair. At the fair he also met Peter Bacigalupi of Lima, Peru and San Francisco; he shipped phonographs to Lima for him and later traveled to San Francisco where he met his step-sister Victoria Adams, whom he married in 1897. After the Chicago fair closed, Douglass bought the hundred slot phonographs and secured a concession for the 1894 Midwinter Fair in San Francisco; this concession and the phonographs were ultimately taken over by Bacigalupi, who then used the machines to open a phonograph arcade on Market Street.

One business opportunity that Douglass was unable to bring to fruition was a contract to exhibit Thomas Edison’s kinetoscope at the World’s Fair. This would have been the first public exhibition of moving pictures, but Edison objected to a clause in the fair contract requiring a bond guaranteeing that the exhibit would be ready by the opening of the fair.

=== Victrola ===
In August 1900, after a brief period working in Philadelphia for the Berliner Gramophone Co., which was closed by a legal action, Douglass agreed to go into business with Eldridge R. Johnson, who owned a machine shop in Camden, New Jersey and had supplied machines to Berliner. The company started doing business in September 1900 as The Consolidated Talking Machine Company but changed to using Johnson’s name because of a conflict with a Berliner company name. On October 3, 1901 it incorporated as the Victor Talking Machine Company. Douglass said it was named after his wife, but others think it more likely Johnson chose the name to celebrate his engineering and legal triumphs. As vice president and general manager at Victor, Douglass was totally responsible for publicity and sales at Victor and therefore is responsible for popularizing the image of the dog listening to “His Master’s Voice”. He also developed and patented the cabinet and stand (with a folded horn hidden behind cabinet doors) that became the Victrola. As he wrote in his unpublished autobiography:

I told Mr. Johnson that it was my opinion that ladies did not like mechanical looking things in their parlors Mr. Johnson improved on my cabinet and the result was the Victrola, an instrument fully enclosed in a cabinet which was an attractive piece of furniture. I ordered two hundred. Mr. Johnson was afraid we would not be able to sell so many and I was a little timid myself, as they cost so much that we would have to sell them at two hundred dollars each. We not only sold those but many millions more. We were obliged to use seven thousand men to make the cabinets alone.

This made him the inventor of what was by the 1920s the most popular home entertainment device in America.

In fall 1906, a few months after the birth of his son Eldridge, Douglass had a nervous breakdown followed by other health problems and became unable to work. He moved his family from Philadelphia to San Rafael, California. He wrote in his autobiography:

I urged Mr. Johnson to accept my resignation. He refused and I was then elected to the office of the Chairman of the Board of Directors. I also urged Mr. Johnson to stop my salary of $25,000.00 per year, which they had kept up all during my illness, but Mr. Johnson replied that if the Victor Co. paid me that amount as long as I lived they could not pay for what I had done for them. Twice, in the early days, by my action alone, I had saved the Victor Co. from going out of business.

=== Motion pictures ===
The other large area of Douglass' technical innovations was motion pictures. Inspired by an Ives Kromskop that he bought in 1898, he began experimenting with color in 1912, and in 1916 patented a process for filming in "natural color" (as opposed to hand-tinting), one of the forerunners of Technicolor. He wrote in his autobiography:

My first moving picture camera made twin negatives, one of red value and the other of green. These two negatives were printed on a double coated positive, on one side of which the tone image was green and on the other side red. When the film was projected it gave the natural colors on the screen....The first showing of any pictures taken with this camera was on May 15, 1917.

The April 15, 1918 issue of The Talking Machine World described "Mr. Douglas' [sic] device" as "an inexpensive attachment that may be affixed to any motion picture camera and which permits of the production of a film containing a series of images so colored as to give, when projected, a moving picture in natural colors, without the use of the rotary colored shutter usually required."

In 1918, Douglass produced Cupid Angling, which may be the first American feature-length color film. It starred Ruth Roland, with Mary Pickford and Douglas Fairbanks making guest appearances. In March 1921 The Talking Machine World stated:

Heretofore the best French color motion picture machine could not take pictures faster than one second for each section of film exposed. Mr. Douglass, after twenty years of experimentation and study...has produced a process by which color photographs can be taken with an exposure of 1-100 of a second. This makes regular motion picture features in color possible.

In 1921 Douglass moved his family to Menlo Park, California, where he bought a 52-room reinforced concrete mansion that had been built by Theodore Payne, a San Francisco hardware manufacturer. Douglass named it Victoria Manor, in honor of his wife. He installed a workshop with lathes, milling machines, and drill presses in the basement, movie equipment on the first floor, and his laboratory workshop on the mezzanine. Since 1945 the house (now in Atherton) has been owned by the Menlo School and called Douglass Hall.

Within a year of the move to Menlo Park, Douglass invented a movie camera with a built-in "triple scene dissolve", which facilitated smooth transitions between scenes by making it possible to film multiple scenes on one reel and "melt" them together. During his years there, he also patented zoom lenses; the first anamorphic lens for undistorted wide-angle film photography; and devices for special effects such as appearing and disappearing ghosts, shrinking one actor in a scene, and the illusion of flames surrounding an actor. By the mid-1920s most of the major movie studios had contracts to rent his special effects cameras for $5,000 a year each.

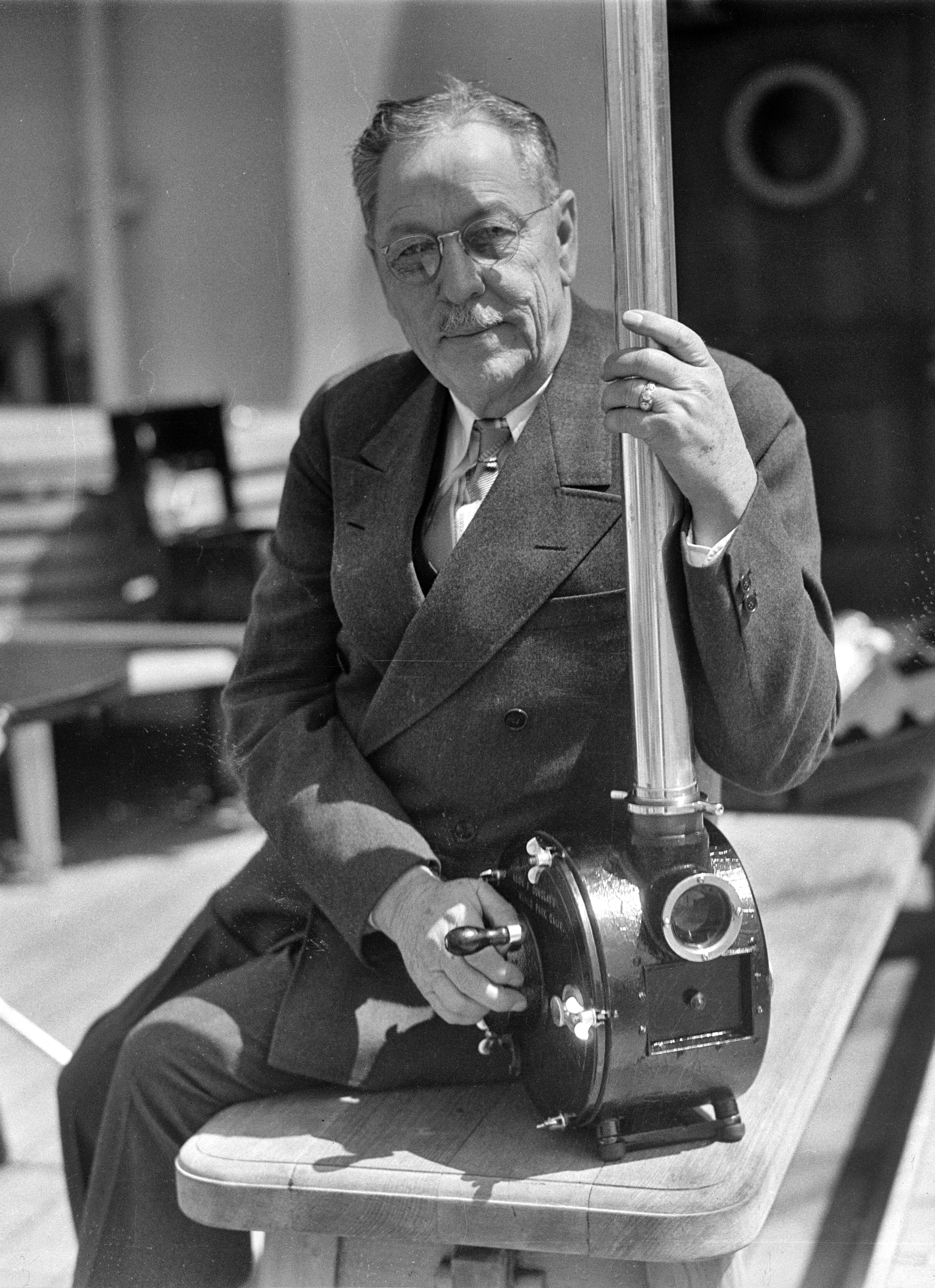
Douglass with his submarine camera

When he sold his holdings in Victor in January 1927, Douglass became very wealthy. Then in 1934, he sued Paramount Pictures, Fox Film Corporation, Technicolor, and the Walt Disney Company for $200 million for infringement of his "natural color" motion picture patents. He won the suit by default when the defendants failed to respond. After lengthy negotiations, a financial settlement was reached. The damages were not made public but believed to be $20 million.

Douglass also invented underwater cameras. He had a window cut in the wall of the pool at Victoria Manor through which he filmed people swimming beneath the surface, usually his daughters Ena and Florence. In one movie they swim with a seal, and in another Florence wrestles an octopus (actually a dead octopus with its appendages wired to her wrists).

In 1932, at the invitation of the Smithsonian Institution, Douglass participated in a scientific expedition off Easter Island, where he filmed at depths up to 1,500 feet using his submarine cameras and also an underwater "flashlight" that he also patented. In the mid-1930s he participated in a classified US Navy operation filming the ocean floor near Pearl Harbor and other strategic sites in Hawaii.

=== Other inventions ===
Douglass also patented inventions in other fields. In 1924 he invented a new type of snap cigarette lighter with a trigger-released spring actuator. One of Douglass' sons left his position with the Victor Talking Machine Company to start the Douglass Lighter Company in San Francisco.

== Later life and death ==
In 1935, two of Douglass’ daughters died, one in a car accident and the other in childbirth, and Douglass retired and he and his wife moved out of Victoria Manor into a small cottage nearby. He died in San Francisco at the age of 71.

== Selected inventions ==
- Slot attachment for phonograph (1889)
- Spring-mounted motor to eliminate storage batteries in Edison phonographs (1891-1893)
- Duplication process for phonograph cylinders (early 1890s)
- Semi-cabinet, stand, record cabinet for phonograph (September 1903-December 1904)
- First successful subtractive color movie process (1916)
- Triple-scene dissolve movie camera (1921-1922)
- Spring-actuated cigarette lighter (1924)
- Zoom lenses
- anamorphic lens for wide-angle filming
- Special-effects movie cameras
- Underwater cameras
- Underwater "flashlight"
