= Hands Up (serial) =

1918 film

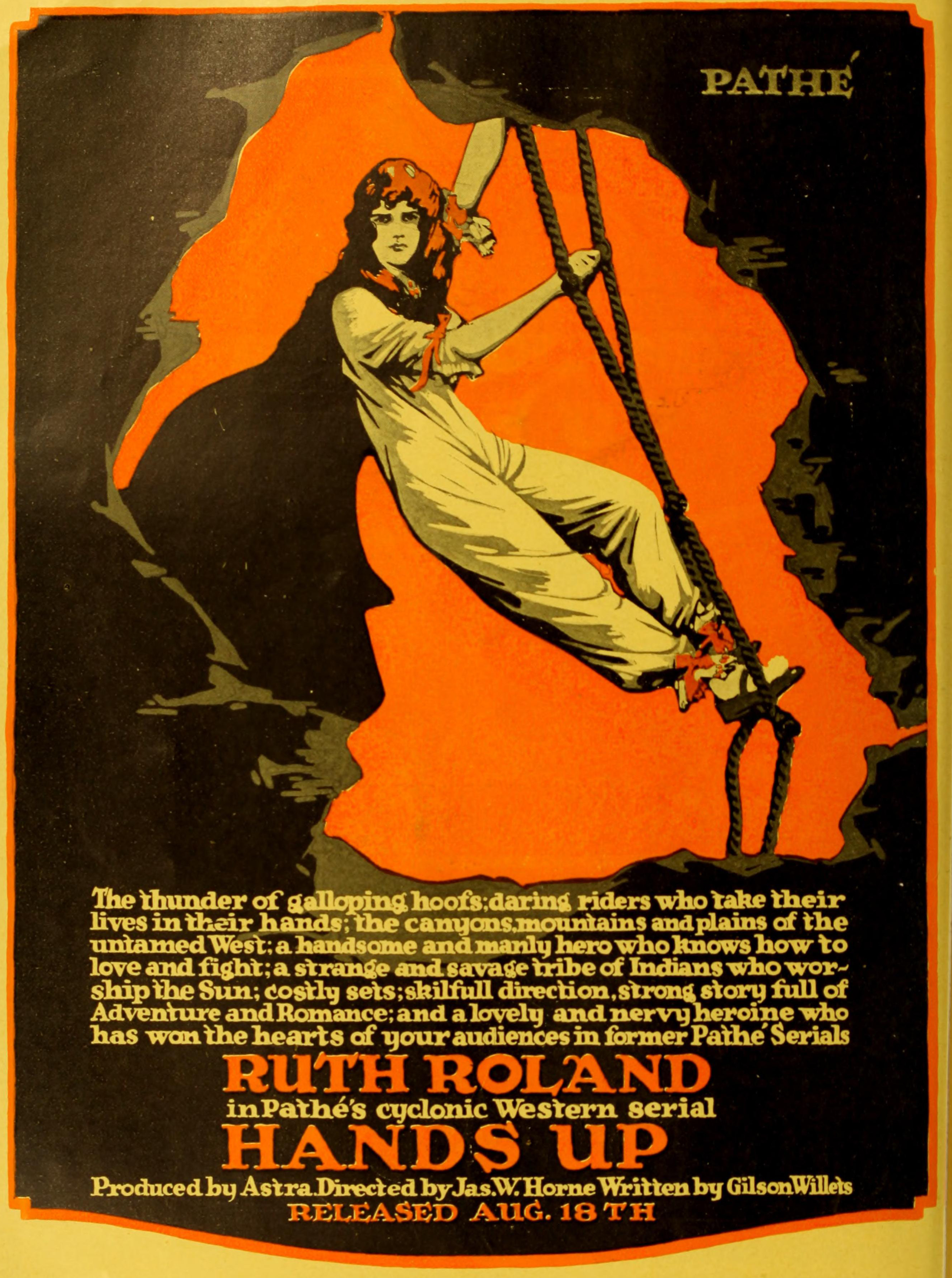
- Film poster
- Directed by: Louis J. Gasnier; James W. Horne
- Written by: Jack Cunningham
- Story by: Gilson Willets
- Starring: Ruth Roland; George Larkin
- Distributed by: Pathé Exchange; Astra Film Company
- Release date: August 18, 1918
- Running time: 15 episodes
- Country: United States
- Language: Silent (English intertitles)

Hands Up is a lost 1918 American adventure film serial directed by Louis J. Gasnier and James W. Horne. The serial was Ruth Roland's breakthrough role.

== Plot ==
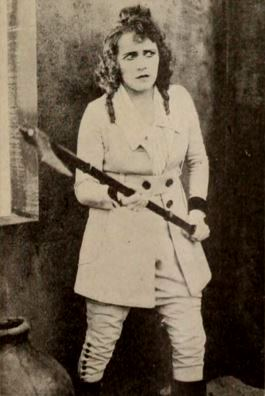
Movie still of Ruth Roland holding an axe

A newspaperwoman finds trouble aplenty when an Inca tribe believes her to be the reincarnation of their long-lost princess.

== Cast ==
- Ruth Roland as Echo Delane.
- George Larkin as Hands Up
- George Chesebro as Hands Up
- Easter Walters as Judith Strange
- William A. Carroll as Sam Killman / Omar the High Priest
- George Gebhardt as The Grand Envoy
- W. E. Lawrence as Prince Pampas (as William E. Lawrence)

Lobby card for episode 1-"The Bride of the Sun"

== Chapter titles ==
The serial consisted of fifteen episodes, released from August 18 to November 24, 1918:

1. Bride of the Sun
2. The Missing Prince
3. The Phantom and the Girl
4. The Phantom's Trail
5. The Runaway Bride
6. Flames of Vengeance
7. Tossed Into the Torrent
8. The Fatal Jewels
9. A Leap Through Space
10. The Sun Message
11. Stranger from the Sea
12. The Silver Book
13. The Last Warning
14. The Oracle's Decree
15. The Celestial Messenger

== Censorship ==
Like many American films of the time, the film serial Hands Up was subject to restrictions and cuts by city and state film censorship boards. The Chicago Board of Censors required a cut in Chapter 1, Reel 3, of the slugging of a man; in Chapter 2, Reel 4, slugging man; in Chapter 3, Reel 1, Indian slugging man, masked man shooting Indian at barred window, Reel 2, shooting scene in which man falls, taking belt from ground, near view of man aiming gun at horseman and his falling off horse; Chapter 5, Reel 1, the two intertitles "I won her fair. She belongs to me now" and "She's mine again", the stabbing of the man, two scenes of Indian bending young woman back on table, Reel 2, slugging the engineer; Chapter 6, Reel 1, binding an Indian woman to telegraph pole and the young woman sitting on a bar; Chapter 8, Reel 1, slugging the man in the cabin, Reel 2, stabbing the man, binding the young woman, two scenes of tying the woman to the horse, and two scenes of dragging the woman; Chapter 9, Reel 1, first hula dance scene, young woman sitting at bar, young woman at table with arm around Mexican man's neck, four saloon fight scenes, Reel 2, first and third scene of man choking woman in bedroom; Chapter 11, Reel 1, the shooting of the old man and, Reel 2, binding of the young woman and old man; Chapter 12, Reel 2, two scenes of shooting and men falling; Chapter 13, Reel 1, the slugging of the guard at the door, and, Reel 2, the slugging of the man on the coach; and, Chapter 14, Reel 2, the shooting by Killman, the shooting of Killman, and the closeup of a choking scene.
