= Ruth of the Rockies =

1920 film

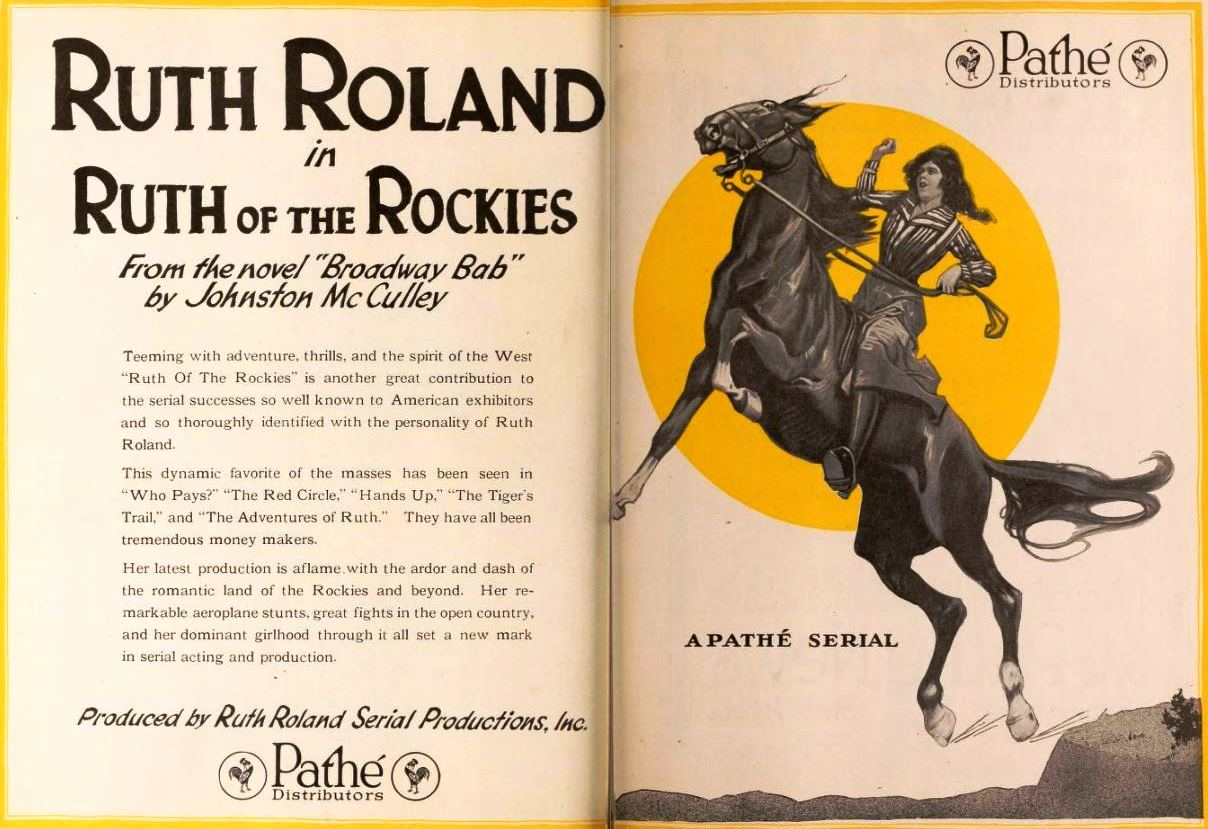
- Advertisement
- Directed by: George Marshall
- Written by: Frances Guihan
- Based on: "Broadway Bab" by Johnston McCulley
- Produced by: Ruth Roland
- Starring: Ruth Roland; Herbert Heyes
- Cinematography: Al Cawood
- Production company: Ruth Roland Serials
- Distributed by: Pathé Exchange
- Release date: August 29, 1920
- Running time: 15 episodes
- Country: United States
- Languages: Silent; English intertitles

Ruth of the Rockies is a 1920 American silent Western film serial directed by George Marshall. Two of the 15 episodes survive in the UCLA Film & Television Archive.

== Plot ==
As described in a film magazine, in New York City breezy Bab Murphy comes into possession of a trunk with the insignia of the Inner Circle, a gang of crooks, who have their headquarters in Dusty Bend along the Mexican border but also operate in New York. The gang trails the trunk to ownership by Bab and, for it and a jade ring that is mysteriously sent to her, a series of adventures begin as she heads for the Bend.

Members of the gang throw the trunk off a train into the California desert where it is picked up by two accomplices in an automobile, only to have an aviator who flies low enough to overpower them and intercept the trunk by taking their place at the wheel. This birdman of mystery will later save Bab from the enforced marriage to a member of the gang, and by the third episode saves her from being imprisoned on the narrow balcony of a high tower.

== Cast ==
- Ruth Roland as Bab Murphy
- Herbert Heyes as Justin Garret
- Thomas G. Lingham as Edward Dugan
- Jack Rollens as Sam Wilkes
- Fred Burns as Burton
- William Gillis as Pendleton Pete
- Gilbert Holmes as Shorty (credited as Pee Wee Holmes)
- Norma Bichole
- Harry Maynard
- S.J. Bingham
- Al Hoxie (Extra / stunts) (uncredited)

== Chapter titles ==
1. The Mysterious Trunk
2. The Inner Circle
3. The Tower of Danger
4. Between Two Fires
5. Double Crossed
6. The Eagle's Nest
7. Troubled Waters
8. Danger Trails
9. The Perilous Path
10. Outlawed
11. The Fatal Diamond
12. The Secret Order
13. The Surprise Attack
14. The Secret of Regina Island
15. The Hidden Treasure

== See also ==
- List of film serials
- List of film serials by studio
