= Smashing Through (1918 film) =

1918 film

- Directed by: Elmer Clifton
- Written by: Walter Woods
- Starring: Herbert Rawlinson; Neal Hart; Sam De Grasse
- Cinematography: Virgil Miller
- Production company: Universal Pictures
- Distributed by: Universal Pictures
- Release date: June 9, 1918
- Running time: 50 minutes
- Country: United States
- Languages: Silent; English intertitles

Smashing Through is a 1918 American silent Western film directed by Elmer Clifton and starring Herbert Rawlinson, Neal Hart and Sam De Grasse.

== Cast ==
- Herbert Rawlinson as Jack Mason
- Neal Hart as Dave Marco
- Sam De Grasse as Earl Foster
- Millard K. Wilson as Ralph Brandon
- Sally Starr as Holly Brandon
- Clarissa Selwynne as Mrs Brandon
- Paul Hurst as Stevens

== Bibliography ==
- James Robert Parish & Michael R. Pitts. Film directors: a guide to their American films. Scarecrow Press, 1974.
