= William Quinn (actor) =

Canadian actor

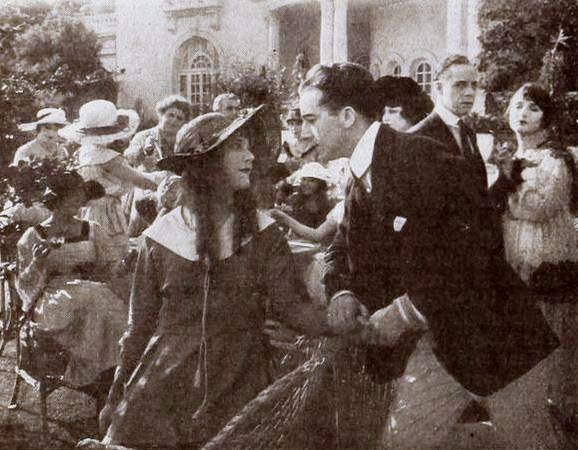
- At background right, William Quinn and Carmel Myers observe Louise Lovely and Jack Mulhall in Sirens of the Sea (1917)
- Years active: 1914–1935

William Quinn was a Canadian actor of stage and film, primarily of the silent era. He appeared in more than 60 films between 1914 and 1935.
