= Wild Justice =

Wild Justice may refer to:

- Wild Justice (novel), a 1979 novel by Wilbur Smith with a 1993 TV miniseries adaptation
- Wild Justice (1925 film), an American silent adventure film
- Wild Justice (TV series), a 2010–2013 American reality series
- "Wild Justice" (The Adventures of Black Beauty), a 1973 TV episode
- "Wild Justice" (Lewis), a 2011 TV episode
- "Wild Justice" (The Professionals), a 1980 TV episode
