= Frank Trenholm Coffyn =

American pioneer aviator

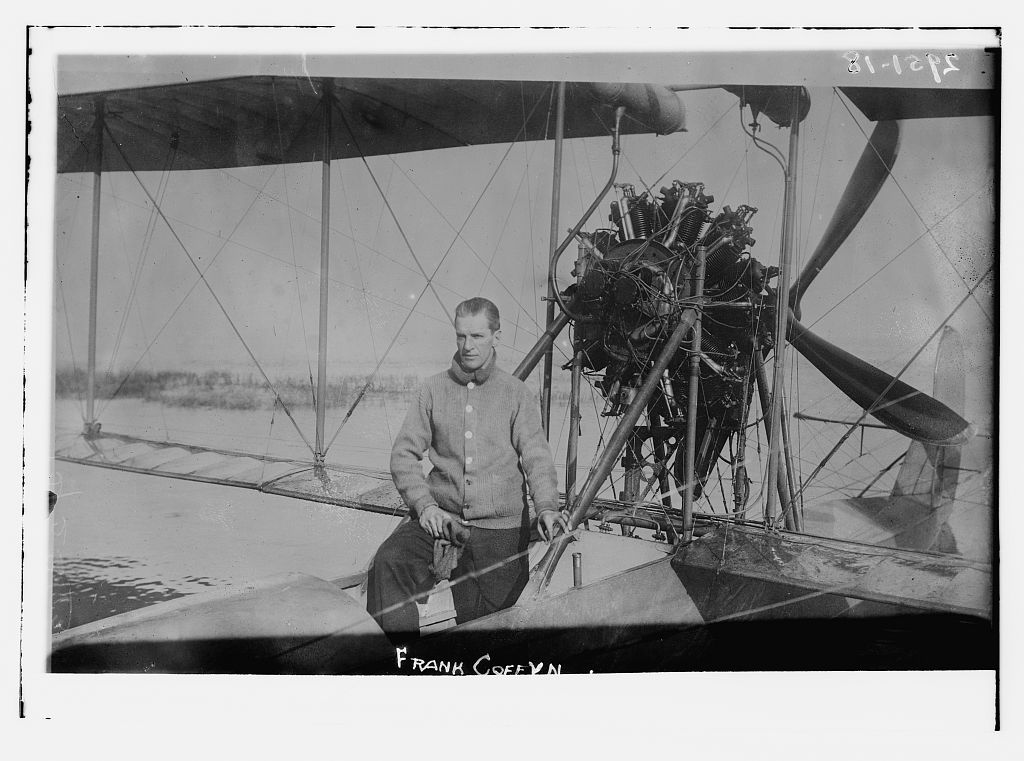
- Frank Coffyn c. 1911
- Born: October 24, 1878; Charleston, South Carolina, U.S.
- Died: December 10, 1960 (aged 82); Palo Alto, California, U.S.
- Occupation: Aviator
- Spouse(s): Louise D. Adams (m. 1902, divorced) Pauline Neff (m. 1919; div. 1928)
- Relatives: William Haskell Coffin, brother

Frank Trenholm Coffyn (October 24, 1878 – December 10, 1960) was a pioneer aviator.

== Biography ==
He was born in Charleston, South Carolina, on October 24, 1878, to Julia (Haskell) and George M. Coffyn, a banker. His brother was William Haskell Coffin, an artist who took his own life in 1941.

He became interested in flight after witnessing a flight by Louis Paulhan in New York City in December 1909. His father knew one of the Wright Company's executives, and arranged a meeting with Wilbur Wright. Wilbur invited Coffyn to Dayton, Ohio, where he began flight instruction in May 1910.

Coffyn flew with the Wright Exhibition Team until December 1910 where he trained pilots in Dayton, Ohio, and he delivered aircraft to the United States Army in Texas.

In 1912 he was hired by Russell A. Alger Jr. (1873–1930) of Detroit, Michigan, to fly a Wright Flyer Model B over New York City. The Vitagraph Film Company had him shoot the first aerial footage of New York City where he flew under the Brooklyn Bridge and Williamsburg Bridge in his Mayea Boat & Aeroplane Works plane. During this period, Coffyn offered plane rides over Manhattan for $5, flying a delicate two-wing aircraft described as looking "as though it were made of tissue paper." His flights gave passengers a rare view of the city from the air, and the events were later documented in photographs preserved at the Library of Congress.

In the mid-1920s Coffyn appeared in several Hollywood silent movies.

He was a United States Army flight instructor in World War I. He sold aircraft for the Burgess Company, and got a helicopter pilot's license. He worked for the Hiller helicopter company until his retirement.

== Personal life and death ==
He married Louise D. Adams in 1902 and had two children: Nancy Lou Coffyn Stralem (1902-1995) and Kingsland A. Coffyn (1904–1983). After they divorced, he married Pauline Louise Neff in 1919. They divorced in 1928. He died on December 10, 1960, in Palo Alto, California.

== In popular culture ==
Frank Trenholm Coffyn is depicted in Jack Finney's 1995 novel From Time to Time, the sequel to Time and Again. In the book, Coffyn is portrayed as an early aviator offering plane rides over Manhattan in 1912, a historical detail that Finney incorporated to lend authenticity to the protagonist Simon Morley’s time-traveling adventures. Finney’s narrative integrates photographs and period research of Coffyn’s flights, allowing readers to experience the city from the perspective of one of its pioneering pilots.

== Selected filmography ==
- Her Husband's Secret (1925)
- Private Affairs (1925)
- Ranson's Folly (1926)
