= The Trail of the Tiger =

1927 film

- Directed by: Henry MacRae
- Written by: Courtney Ryley Cooper; Carl Krusada
- Starring: Jack Dougherty; Frances Teague
- Distributed by: Universal Pictures
- Release date: November 7, 1927
- Country: United States
- Languages: Silent; English intertitles

The Trail of the Tiger is a 1927 American film serial directed by Henry MacRae. The film is considered to be lost.

== Cast ==
- Jack Dougherty as Jack Stewart (as Jack Daugherty)
- Frances Teague as Trixie Hemingway
- Jack Mower as Tiger Jordan
- John Webb Dillion as John Hemingway
- Charles Murphy as Rube Murphy
- Billy Platt as Babs, the Dwarf (as William Platt)
- Jack Richardson as Ned Calvert

== See also ==
- List of film serials
- List of film serials by studio
