= Let's Get Married (1926 film) =

1926 film

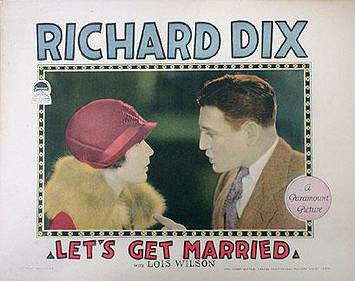
- Lobby card
- Directed by: Gregory La Cava
- Written by: Luther Reed (adaptation); J. Clarkson Miller (writer); John Bishop (intertitles)
- Based on: The Man from Mexico by Henry A. Du Souchet
- Produced by: Adolph Zukor; Jesse L. Lasky; William LeBaron (associate producer)
- Starring: Richard Dix; Lois Wilson
- Cinematography: Edward Cronjager
- Distributed by: Paramount Pictures
- Release date: March 1, 1926
- Running time: 70 minutes 7 reels (6,700 feet)
- Country: United States
- Language: Silent (English intertitles)

Let's Get Married is a 1926 American silent comedy film produced by Famous Players–Lasky and distributed by Paramount Pictures. It was directed by Gregory La Cava and stars Richard Dix and Lois Wilson. The film is based on an 1897 play The Man from Mexico by Henry A. Du Souchet performed by William Collier, Sr. This film is a remake of a 1914 film, The Man from Mexico starring John Barrymore which is now considered a lost film.

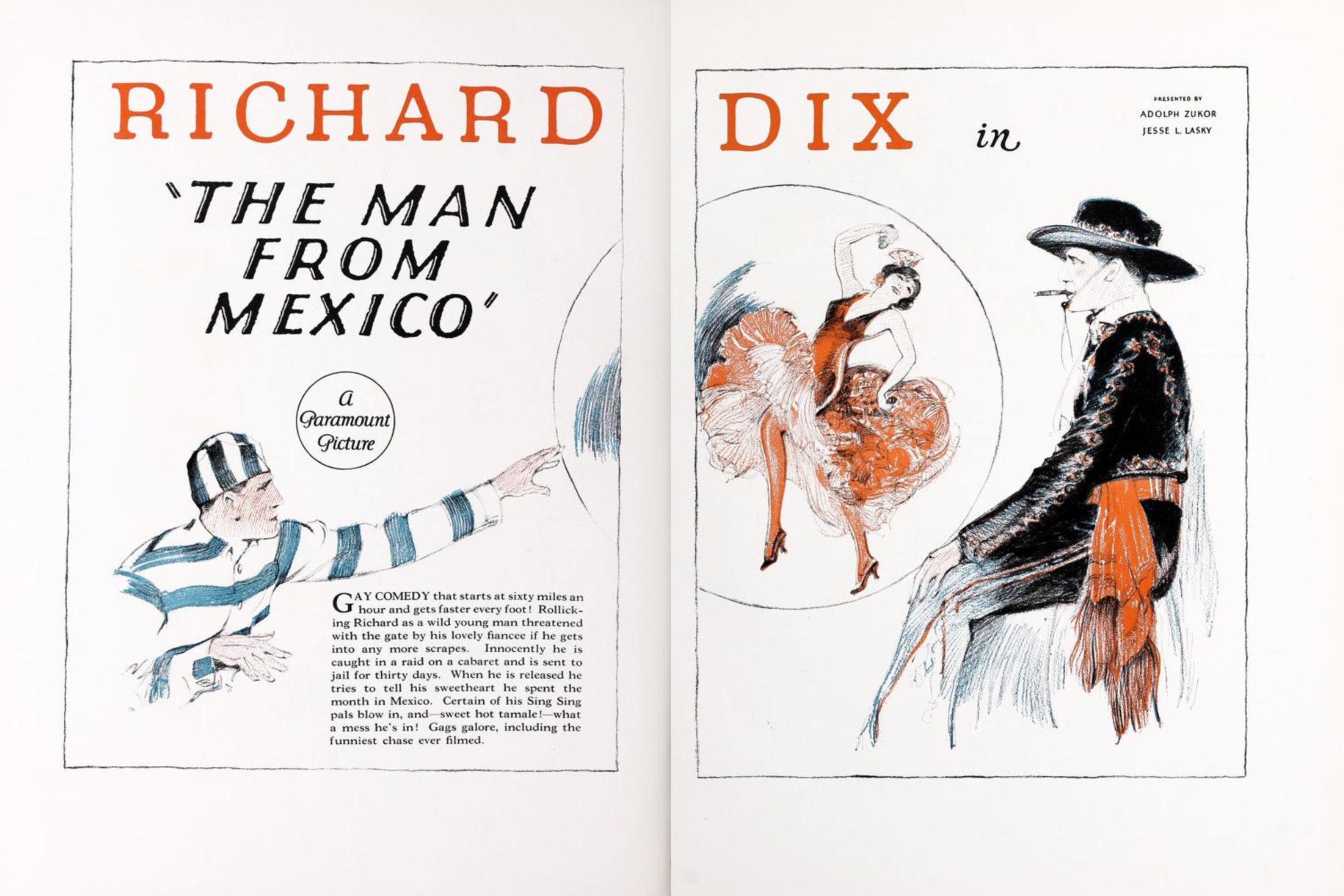
1925 advertisement for this film before the name change

== Plot ==
As described in a film magazine review, Billy Dexter, pinched while celebrating a college football game victory, is released. He promises his sweetheart Mary that he will reform and starts selling hymnbooks. However, fate tangles him in a nightclub scrap; he is rearrested and sent to jail. With the aid of a friendly detective, he deceives Mary by telling her that he is on a missionary tour of the South Sea Islands. He escapes and persuades her to wed him right away. The marriage ceremony is constantly interrupted by detectives trailing Billy, but he avoids them until the nuptial knot is tied. An officer then hands him his discharge papers.

== Cast ==
- Richard Dix as Billy Dexter
- Lois Wilson as Mary Corbin
- Nat Pendleton as Jimmy
- Douglas MacPherson as Tommy
- Gunboat Smith as Slattery
- Joseph Kilgour as Billy's Father
- Thomas Findley as Mary's Father
- Edna May Oliver as J.W. Smith

== Preservation ==
A print of Let's Get Married is preserved at the Library of Congress.
