= The Great Lover (1931 film) =

1931 film

- Directed by: Harry Beaumont
- Written by: Gene Markey; Edgar Allan Woolf
- Based on: The Great Lover; 1915 play by Leo Ditrichstein; Fanny Hatton; Frederick Hatton
- Starring: Adolphe Menjou; Irene Dunne; Ernest Torrence
- Cinematography: Merritt B. Gerstad
- Edited by: Helene Warne
- Music by: Charles-François Gounod
- Production company: Metro-Goldwyn-Mayer
- Distributed by: Metro-Goldwyn-Mayer
- Release date: July 18, 1931
- Running time: 71 minutes
- Country: United States
- Language: English

The Great Lover is a 1931 American pre-Code romantic drama film directed by Harry Beaumont and starring Adolphe Menjou and Irene Dunne. The supporting cast includes Ernest Torrence, Neil Hamilton and Olga Baclanova. It as produced and distributed by Metro-Goldwyn-Mayer and based on the 1915 The Great Lover by Leo Ditrichstein. Dunne was loaned from RKO for the film.

== Plot ==
Jean Paurel is a famous opera star, who agrees to help Diana Page her career, in order to take advantage of her. But instead he finds himself falling in love with her.

== Cast ==
- Adolphe Menjou as Jean Paurel
- Irene Dunne as Diana Page
- Ernest Torrence as Potter
- Neil Hamilton as Carlo
- Olga Baclanova as Savarova
- Cliff Edwards as Finney
- Hale Hamilton as Stapleton
- Roscoe Ates as Rosco
- Herman Bing as Losseck
- Elsa Janssen as Madam Neumann Baumbach
- Lilian Bond as Mrs. Loring

== Production ==
An earlier version, also based on the 1915 play, was The Great Lover (1920), starring John Sainpolis and Claire Adams.

The 1949 film The Great Lover starring Bob Hope was similar in title only.

== Bibliography ==
- Gehring, Wes D. Irene Dunne: First Lady of Hollywood. Scarecrow Press, 2006.
- Goble, Alan. The Complete Index to Literary Sources in Film. Walter de Gruyter, 1999.
