= Paris Bound =

1929 film

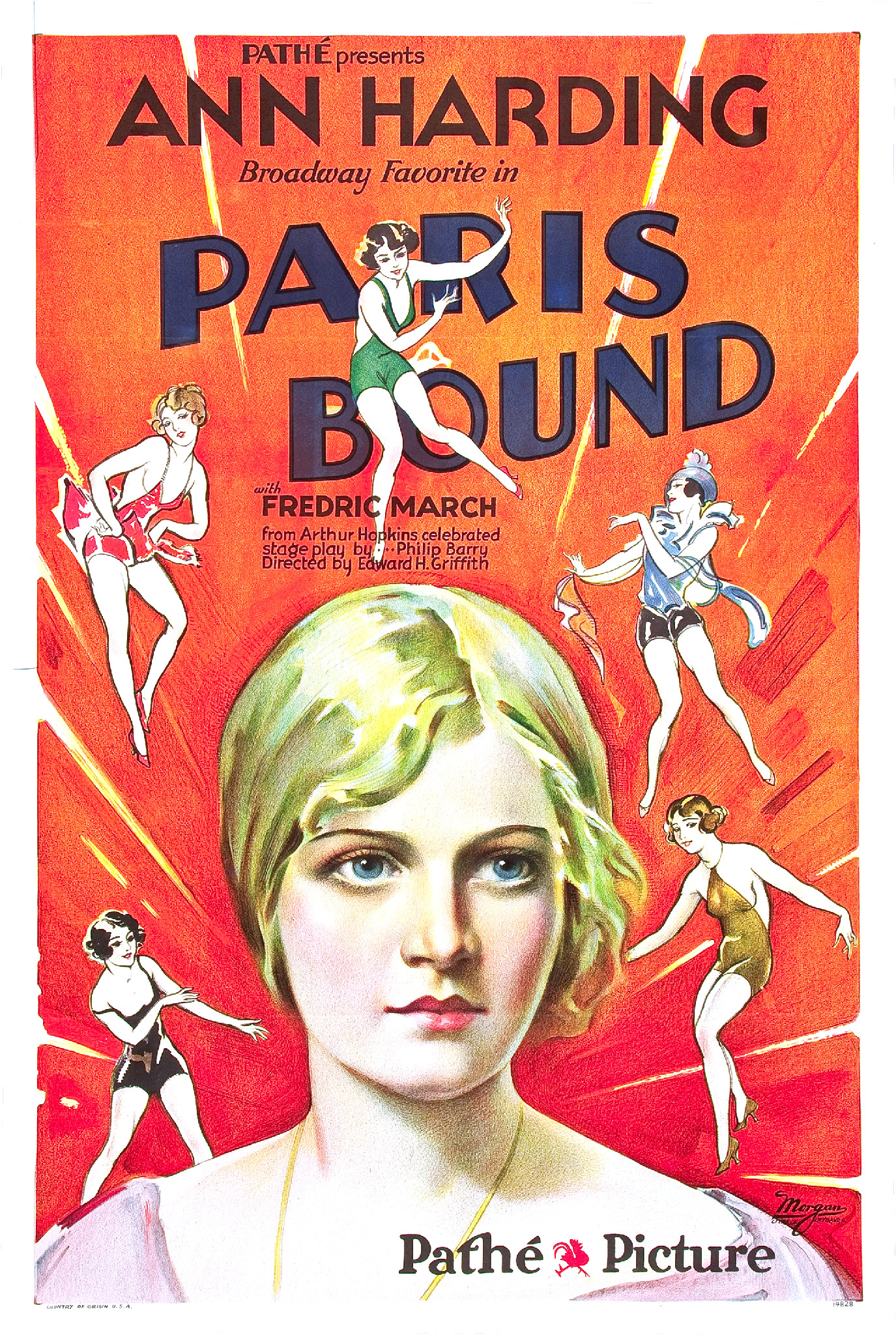
- Film poster
- Directed by: Edward H. Griffith
- Written by: Horace Jackson (adaptation); Frank Reicher (dialogue)
- Based on: Paris Bound; 1927 play by Philip Barry
- Produced by: Arthur Hopkins
- Starring: Ann Harding
- Cinematography: Norbert Brodine
- Edited by: Helene Warne
- Music by: Arthur Alexander; Josiah Zuro
- Distributed by: Pathé Exchange
- Release date: August 3, 1929
- Running time: 73 minutes; 8 reels
- Country: United States
- Language: English

(For a similar sounding film of the same year see Paris (1929 film))

Paris Bound is a 1929 American pre-Code romantic drama film directed by Edward H. Griffith and starring Ann Harding and Fredric March. It is based on the 1927 play of the same name by Philip Barry.

== Plot ==
Paris Bound (1929)

Jim Hutton and Mary Archer are liberal-minded lovers content to remain faithful to each other in spirit only without need of a marriage certificate. However, they eventually do wed. Among the wedding guests is the young composer Richard Parrish, hardly disguising his admiration for the bride, and Noel Farley, whose passion is exceeded only by the pain of losing Jim to another woman. A child is born to them. When Jim goes off to Europe on a business trip, Mary declines to accompany him. Noel, who owns a villa at Antibes, lures Jim into a rendezvous. Meanwhile, Mary has an affair with Richard. Learning of Jim's rendezvous, she considers a Paris divorce so as to marry Richard. When Jim unexpectedly returns, he tells Mary of his affair with a French woman. Mary is devastated, for she would never believe that her husband would actually sleep with another woman. In the end their mutual love is confirmed, and they decide to adopt traditional marriage morals and remain monogamous.

== Cast ==
- Ann Harding as Mary Hutton
- Fredric March as Jim Hutton
- Carmelita Geraghty as Noel Farley
- Leslie Fenton as Richard Parrish
- George Irving as James Hutton, Sr.
- Charlotte Walker as Helen White
- Hallam Cooley as Peter
- Juliette Crosby as Nora Cope
- Ilka Chase as Fanny Shipman
- Rose Tapley as Julie

== Play production history ==
- The play ran on Broadway at the Music Box Theatre from December 27, 1927 to July 1928 for 234 performances. The production was directed by Arthur Hopkins. This is the play's only Broadway production to date, according to IBDB.
- In 1929, the play ran at the Lyric Theatre with Herbert Marshall, Edna Best and Laurence Olivier.

== See also ==
- List of early sound feature films (1926–1929)
