= Her Husband's Secret =

1925 film

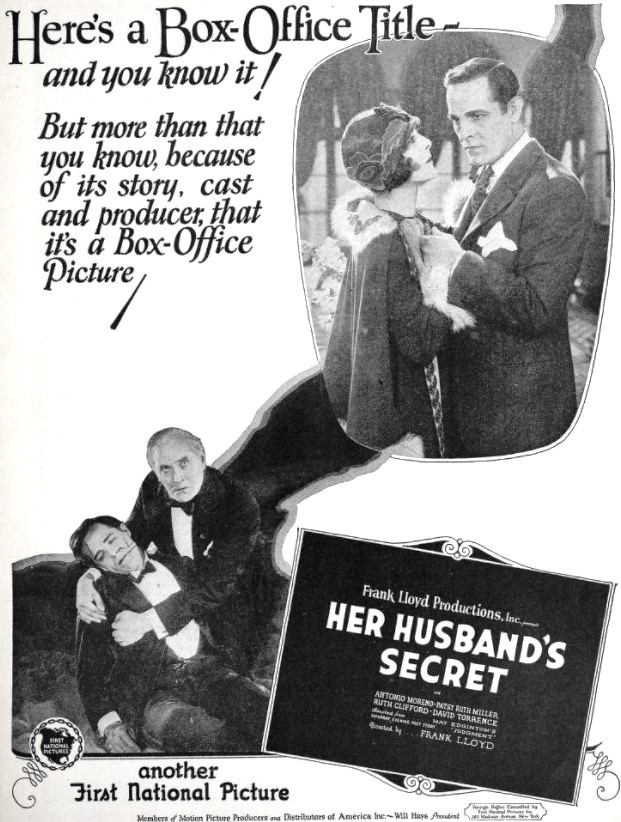
- Advertisement
- Directed by: Frank Lloyd
- Written by: J.G. Hawks; Frank Lloyd
- Based on: "Judgment" by May Edginton
- Produced by: Frank Lloyd
- Starring: Antonio Moreno; Patsy Ruth Miller; Ruth Clifford
- Cinematography: Norbert Brodine
- Production company: Frank Lloyd Productions
- Distributed by: First National Pictures
- Release date: February 22, 1925
- Running time: 70 minutes
- Country: United States
- Language: Silent (English intertitles)

Her Husband's Secret is a 1925 American silent drama film directed by Frank Lloyd and starring Antonio Moreno, Patsy Ruth Miller, and Ruth Clifford.

== Plot ==
As described in a review in a film magazine, tiring of his home life, Leon Kent gives a wild party and his wife leaves with their young son and goes to a neighbor's house. Ross Brewster, a banker, sympathizes with her. Kent becomes enraged and, taking the son, leaves home. Twenty-five years later, Brewster and Mrs. Kent, although they have never married, maintain a beautiful friendship. Brewster's daughter Judy returns home bringing her fiancé Elliot Owen. Brewster's knowledge of men enables him to read Owen's character. Owen confesses that he has already married Judy and demands that Brewster save him from prison and disgrace. When Brewster refuses, Owen discloses that he is Mrs. Kent's son. Brewster suggests that the only way to redeem himself is by walking off a cliff, and, when he refuses, taunts him and calls him a coward. When Judy discloses that she will soon be a mother, Owen sees himself in a new light and takes the plunge. Brewster finds him at the base of the cliff, injured but still alive. Sometime later in the Brewster house, a meeting is held to determine the fate of a dishonest employee. Brewster, pleading important business to attend, leaves to play with the baby, while Owen pleads for leniency for the boy and gives him a second chance.

== Cast ==
- Antonio Moreno as Elliot Owen
- Patsy Ruth Miller as Judy Brewster
- Ruth Clifford as Mrs. Pearce
- David Torrence as Ross Brewster
- Walter McGrail as Leon Kent
- Phyllis Haver as Pansy La Rue
- Pauline Neff as Mrs. Van Tuyler
- Margaret Fielding as Irene Farway
- Edwards Davis as Tony Van Orien
- Frank Coffyn as Broker
- Fred Warren as Broker
- Frankie Darro as Young Elliot Owen
- Frances Teague as Miss Van Tuyler
- Lou Salter as Maid
- Harry Lonsdale as Brewster's Butler

== Preservation ==
With no prints of Her Husband's Secret located in any film archives, it is a lost film.

== Bibliography ==
- Goble, Alan. The Complete Index to Literary Sources in Film. Walter de Gruyter, 1999.
