= The Man from Mexico =

1914 film

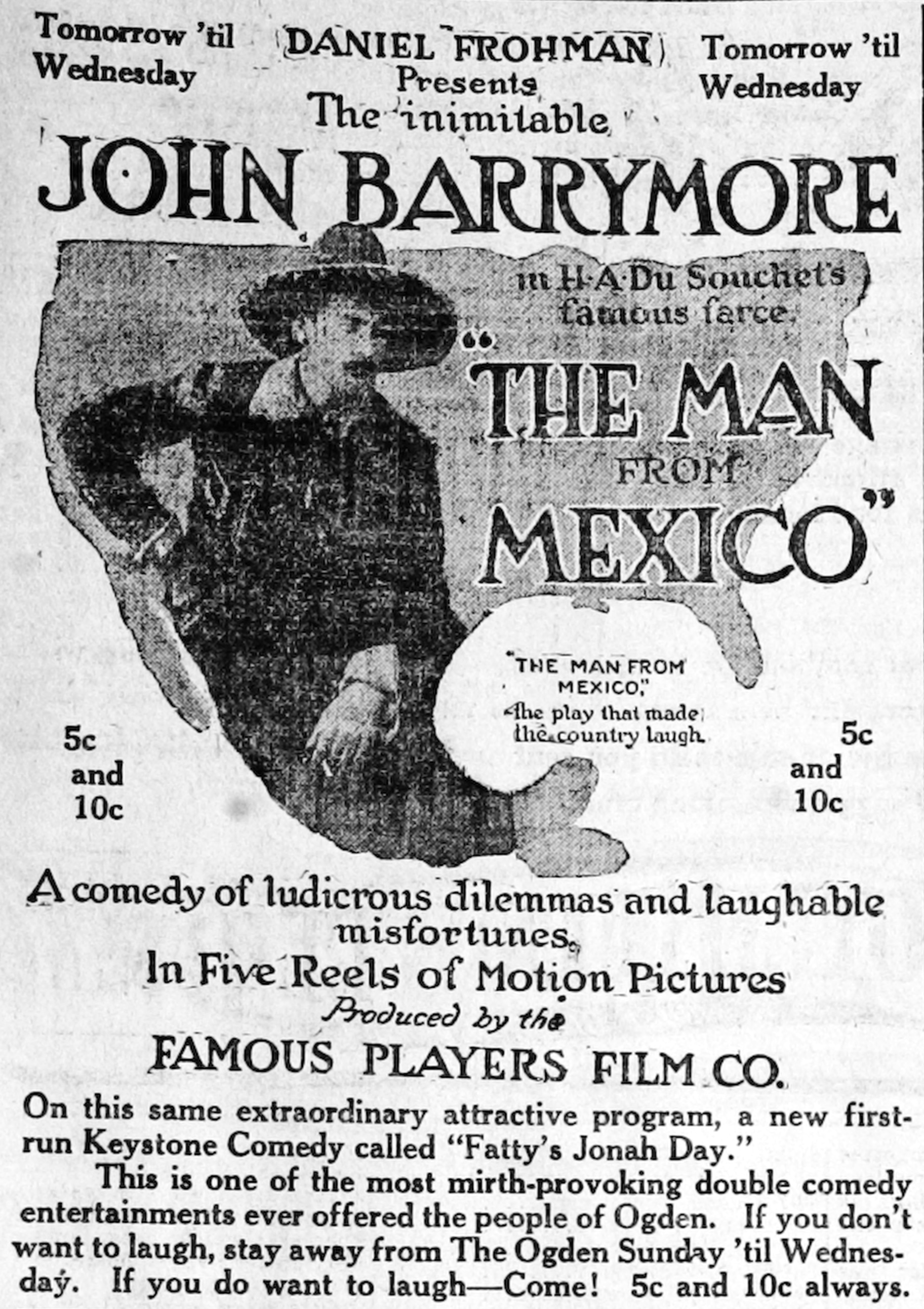
- Newspaper advertisement.
- Directed by: Thomas N. Heffron
- Written by: Henry A. DuSouchet (play: The Man from Mexico); Eve Unsell (scenario)
- Produced by: Adolph Zukor; Daniel Frohman
- Starring: John Barrymore
- Distributed by: Famous Players Film Company
- Release date: November 2, 1914
- Running time: 5 reels (5,145 feet)
- Country: United States
- Language: Silent film (English intertitles)

The Man from Mexico is a 1914 silent film produced by the Famous Players Film Company and Daniel Frohman. It starred John Barrymore in his second feature film and was remade in 1926 as Let's Get Married starring Richard Dix. The film was rereleased by Paramount in 1919 as part of the company's "Success Series" reissue of early successes. The Man from Mexico is now a lost film.

The film is based on a Broadway play by Henry A. DuSouchet and was first performed in 1897 with William Collier Sr. Collier toured the play and it became a staple of his repertoire.

== Cast ==
- John Barrymore - Fitzhugh
- Wellington Playter - Prison Warden
- Harold Lockwood - Danton
- Pauline Neff - Clementia Fitzhew
- Anton Ascher - Schmidt
- Fred Annerly - Louis
- Winona Winter - Sally
- Nathaniel Sack

== See also ==
- John Barrymore filmography
