= Ranson's Folly (1926 film) =

1926 film

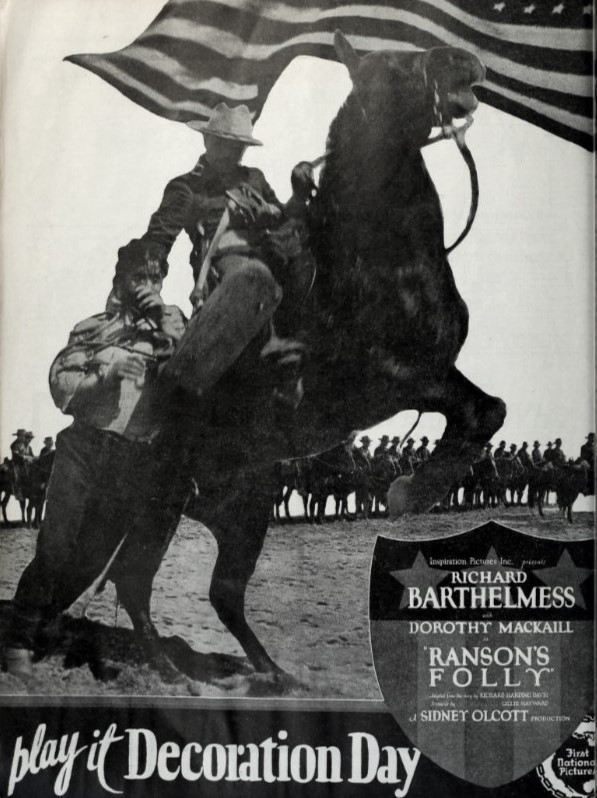
- Advertisement
- Directed by: Sidney Olcott
- Written by: Lillie Hayward (adaptation & scenario)
- Based on: Ranson's Folly by Richard Harding Davis
- Produced by: Richard Barthelmess
- Starring: Richard Barthelmess; Dorothy Mackaill
- Cinematography: David W. Gobbett
- Edited by: Helene Warne
- Distributed by: First National Pictures
- Release date: May 30, 1926
- Running time: 78 minutes; 8 reels (7,322 feet)
- Country: United States
- Languages: Silent; English intertitles

Ranson's Folly is a 1926 American silent Western film produced by and starring Richard Barthelmess and co-starring Dorothy Mackaill. It is based on a Richard Harding Davis novel and 1904 play, Ranson's Folly, and was filmed previously in 1910 and in 1915 by Edison.

== Cast ==
- Richard Barthelmess as Lt. Ranson
- Dorothy Mackaill as Mary Cahill
- Anders Randolf as The Post Trader
- Pat Hartigan as Sgt. Clancy
- William Bailey as Lt. Crosby (credited as William Norton Bailey)
- Brooks Benedict as Lt. Curtis
- C. C. Smith as Col. Bolland (credited as C.C. Smith USA)
- Pauline Neff as Mrs. Bolland
- Billie Bennett as Mrs. Truesdale
- Frank Coffyn as Post Adjutant
- Hans Joby as Judge Advocate (credited as Capt. John S. Peters USN)
- Taylor N. Duncan as Capt. Carr (credited as Taylor Duncan)
- J. C. Fowler as Col. Patten (credited as Jack Fowler)
- Edward W. Bowman as Pop Henderson (credited as E. W. Borman)
- Bud Pope as Abe Fisher
- Forrest Seabury as Drummer
- Chief Eagle Wing as Indian Pete
- Chief John Big Tree as Chief Standing Bear

== Preservation ==
A print of Ranson's Folly is in the UCLA Film & Television Archive.
