= Helene Warne =

British film editor

- Born: Hélène Hilda Warne; November 11, 1894; Claygate, Surrey, England
- Died: March 25, 1993 (aged 98); Baldwin Park, California, USA
- Occupation: Film editor
- Spouse: James Warwick-Huke (div.)

Helene Warne was a British film editor who worked on American films during the 1920s and early 1930s.

== Hollywood career ==
Helene was born in Claygate, England, in 1894. In 1914, after graduating from college, she and her husband, James Warwick-Huke, moved to the United States. The pair soon divorced without children; according to census records, by 1920 Warne was living in Los Angeles and working as a script clerk at a film studio. She eventually moved her way up into working as an editor.

She and Irish director Herbert Brenon were early adopters of editing their silent films to the rhythms of specific external soundtracks. "If only I had music to cut it with," she found herself thinking while working on a film. "I would know how the audience will feel when it appears onscreen. It would also help me with the tempo." Brenon then brought out a collection of phonographs, and the pair found music that seemed to suit the action being depicted onscreen.

== Selected filmography ==
- The Great Lover (1931)
- La Pérè Cèlibataire (1931)
- Paris Bound (1929)
- Ranson's Folly (1926)
- Wild Oats Lane (1926)
- The Spanish Dancer (1923)
