= Pauline Neff =

American actress

- Born: Pauline Louise Neff; April 17, 1885; Altoona, Pennsylvania, U.S.
- Died: July 3, 1951 (aged 66); Los Angeles, California, U.S.
- Other name: Mrs. Frank Coffyn
- Occupation: Actor
- Spouse(s): 1.?__Metzger(1902-05) 2.James Monroe Munyon(1908-14) 3.Frank T. Coffyn(?-1951; her death)

Pauline Neff (1885–1951) was an American stage and screen actress.

The daughter of judge Daniel J. Neff, she was born in Altoona, Pennsylvania, and died in Los Angeles California.

Neff married James P. Munyon, a "multi-millionaire medicine manufacturer" when she was 24 and he was "close to 60".

Her third husband was Frank T. Coffyn an aviator for the Wright brothers, who often appeared in films alongside her.

== Selected filmography ==
- The Man from Mexico (1914)
- Let Not Man Put Asunder (1924)
- Her Husband's Secret (1925)
- The Masked Bride (1925)
- Ranson's Folly (1926)
- Women Love Diamonds (1927)
- The Claw (1927)
