= Frances Teague =

American actress

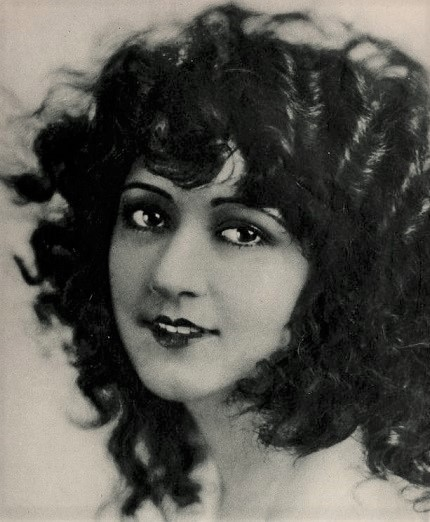
- Teague in 1925
- Born: April 12, 1905; Oakland, California, U. S.
- Died: July 22, 1969 (aged 64); U.S.
- Occupation: Actress
- Spouse: 1922–1927

Frances Teague (April 12, 1905 — July 22, 1969) an American actress who worked in stage and films.

== Early years ==
Teague was born in Oakland, California, but grew up in San Francisco after her family moved there when she was a child. She came from a family of railroad men. Walter E. Teague, her father, worked for the Southern Pacific railroad, Her grandfather, John Francis Teague, was a fireman and later an engineer on the Central Pacific Railroad. Her mother was prominent in civic and social activities in San Francisco. As a child, Teague staged plays for children in her neighborhood. She graduated from Miss Hamlin's School for Girls, a finishing school in San Francisco. She prepared for a film career for four years, studying drama and interpretative dancing. She was "an accomplished dramatic reader and ballroom dancer".

== Career ==
In 1922 Teague performed on stage with the Garret and Garden Players in San Francisco.

Erich von Stroheim noticed Teague when she was 17 years old, and she made screen tests for him. Her visit to on-location filming for The Iron Horse in January 1924 led to her acting in that film. She accompanied her father to the filming site in Nevada because he wanted to see how the film depicted the beginning of the railroad company for which he worked. Director John Ford asked Teague if she wanted a part in the film. When she said that she did, he cast her as a dance hall girl. After a six months' probationary arrangement, she signed a long-term contract with Fox.

Teague had the leading female role in three of her first five films for Fox. Her work in films included portraying a telephone operator in The Last Edition, Miss Van Tuyler in Her Husband's Secret, a bridesmaid in Hearts of Oak, Polly Ann Hadley in Wild Justice, the society girl in Nellie, and Polka Dot in The Iron Horse. In 1928 she co-starred in the 10-episode film serial The Trail of the Tiger, portraying a bareback rider in a traveling circus.

=== Critical response ===
Photoplay magazine described Teague's work in The Iron Horse as "an alluring characterization of Polka Dot". Motion Picture News said, "Frances Teague lends charm and color" to The Last Edition.
