= Wild Oats Lane =

1926 film

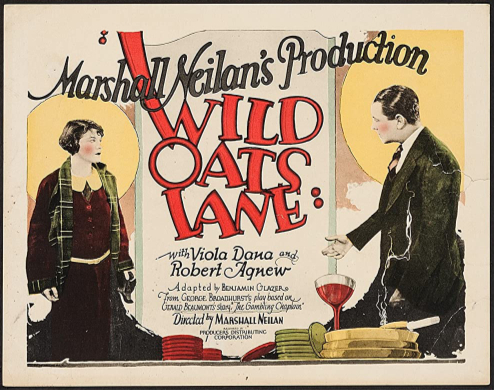
- Lobby card
- Directed by: Marshall Neilan
- Written by: Benjamin Glazer
- Based on: Wild Oats Lane by George Broadhurst
- Produced by: Marshall Neilan
- Starring: Viola Dana; Robert Agnew
- Cinematography: David Kesson; Donald Biddle Keyes
- Edited by: Helene Warne
- Production company: Marshall Neilan Productions
- Distributed by: Producers Distributing Corporation
- Release date: February 28, 1926
- Running time: 7 reels
- Country: United States
- Language: Silent (English intertitles)

Wild Oats Lane is a lost 1926 American silent drama film directed by Marshall Neilan and starring Viola Dana, Robert Agnew, and John MacSweeney.

== Plot ==
As described in a film magazine review, the Boy, leaving the Sing Sing prison embittered with life, meets Marie, a Girl who is honest and whose Father objects to their marrying. The Boy leaves for New York City with the Girl’s promise to meet him there. When she arrives, he fails to meet her as he is being held captive by some criminals. Believing she has been deserted, she turns into an adventuress to support herself and he becomes a dope fiend. Numerous exciting incidents occur before they are reunited and, with the help of the Priest, reclaimed.

== Cast ==
- Viola Dana as Marie, the Girl
- Robert Agnew as The Boy
- John MacSweeney as The Priest
- Margaret Seddon as The Mother
- George Barnum as The Father
- Jerry Miley as The Dude
- Scott Welsh as The Detective
- Robert Brower as The Kleptomaniac
- Eddie James as The Gangster
- Mitchell Lewis as The Bum

== Bibliography ==
- Goble, Alan. The Complete Index to Literary Sources in Film. Walter de Gruyter, 1999. ISBN 3598114923
