= William Haskell Coffin =

American painter

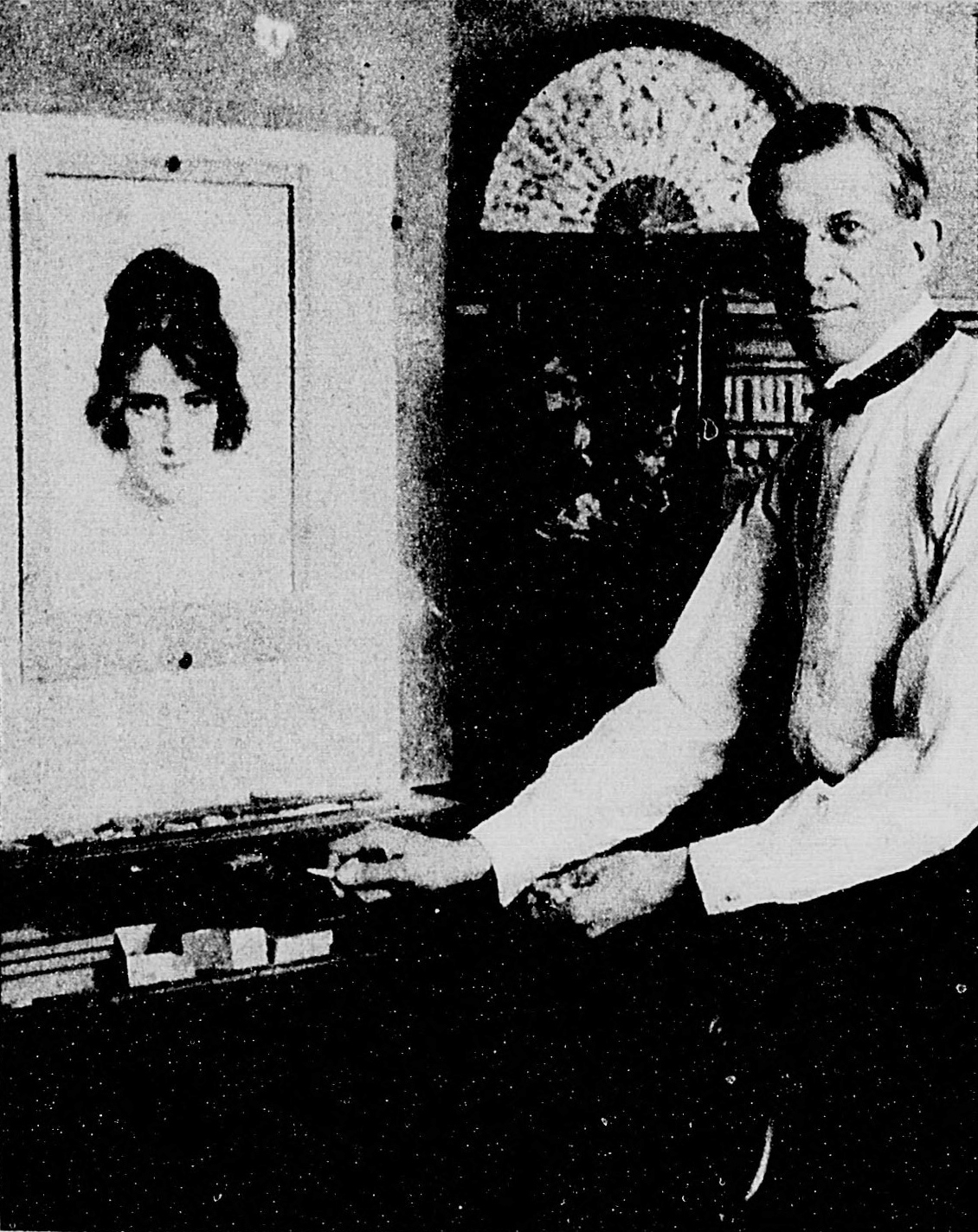
Haskell Coffin with a portrait

William Haskell Coffin (October 21, 1878 – May 12, 1941) was an American painter and commercial artist. He flourished in the early decades of the twentieth century, and his work appeared on the covers of leading magazines in the United States. He also produced posters commissioned by the US government.

== Biography ==
Coffin was born in Charleston, South Carolina, on October 21, 1878, the son of Julia (Haskell) and George Mathewes Coffin. When he was young, his family moved to Washington, DC, where he attended the Corcoran School of Art. After a brief stint back in Charleston, where he painted portraits of society ladies, he went to France in 1902 to complete his training as an artist.

Coffin specialized in images of women, which were reproduced on the covers of popular magazines such as The Saturday Evening Post, The American Magazine, Redbook, McCall's, Leslie's Illustrated, and the Pictorial Review. He was one of the most highly paid illustrators of his era.

Coffin married twice. His second wife was actress Frances Starr, whom he married in 1920; the couple divorced in 1930..

Coffin was being treated for depression in an institution in St. Petersburg, Florida, when he leaped from a third-floor window and died on May 12, 1941.

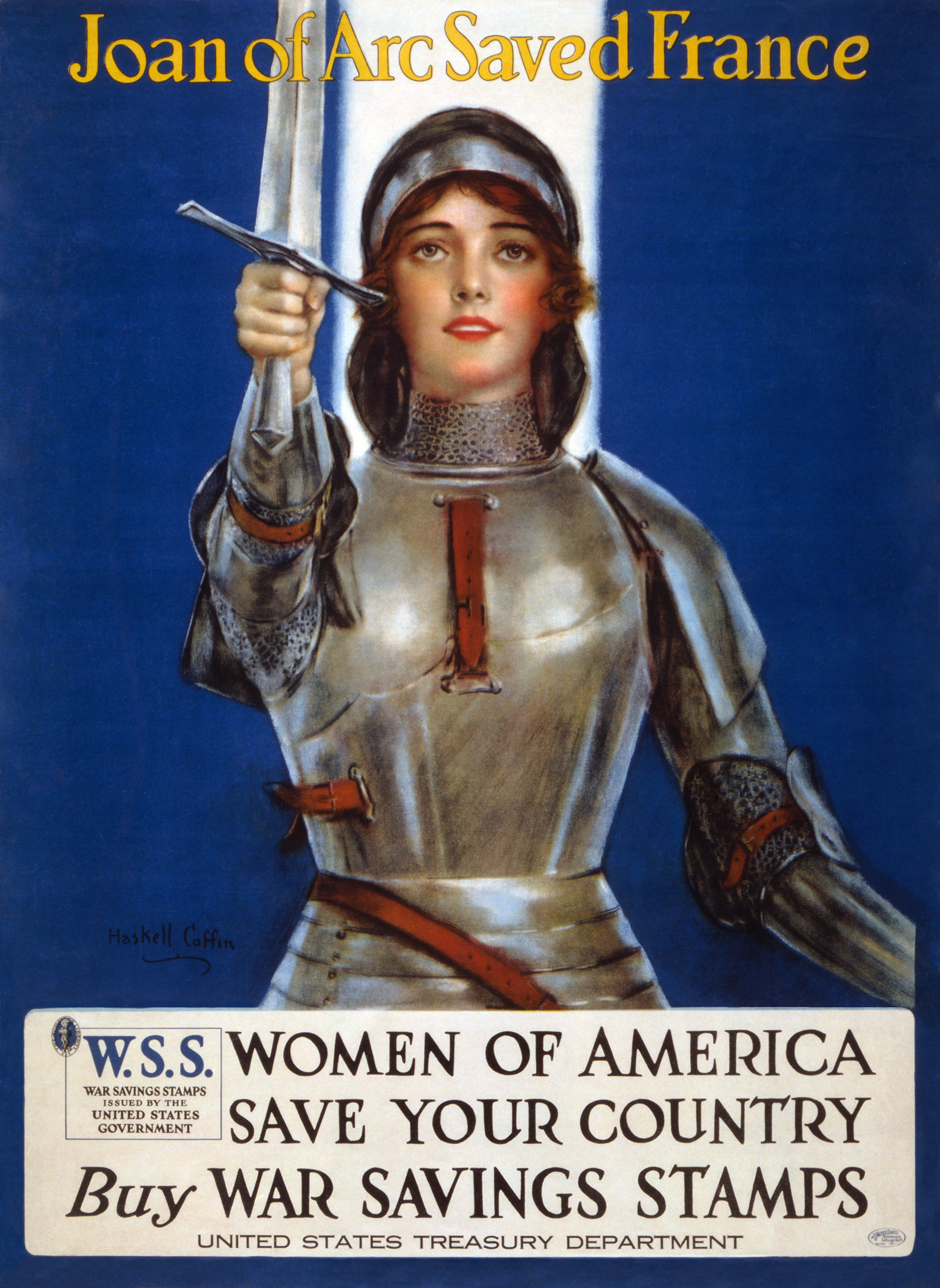
World War I era poster

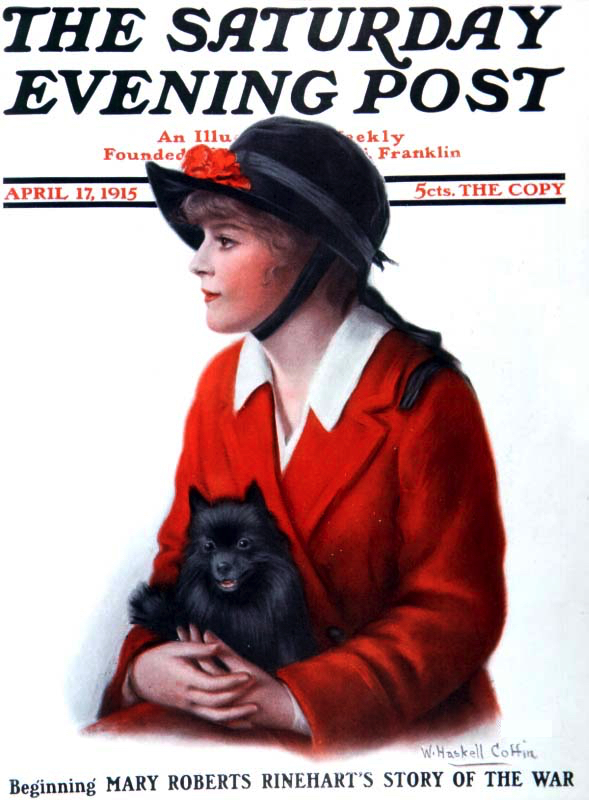
Saturday Evening Post cover, April 17, 1915

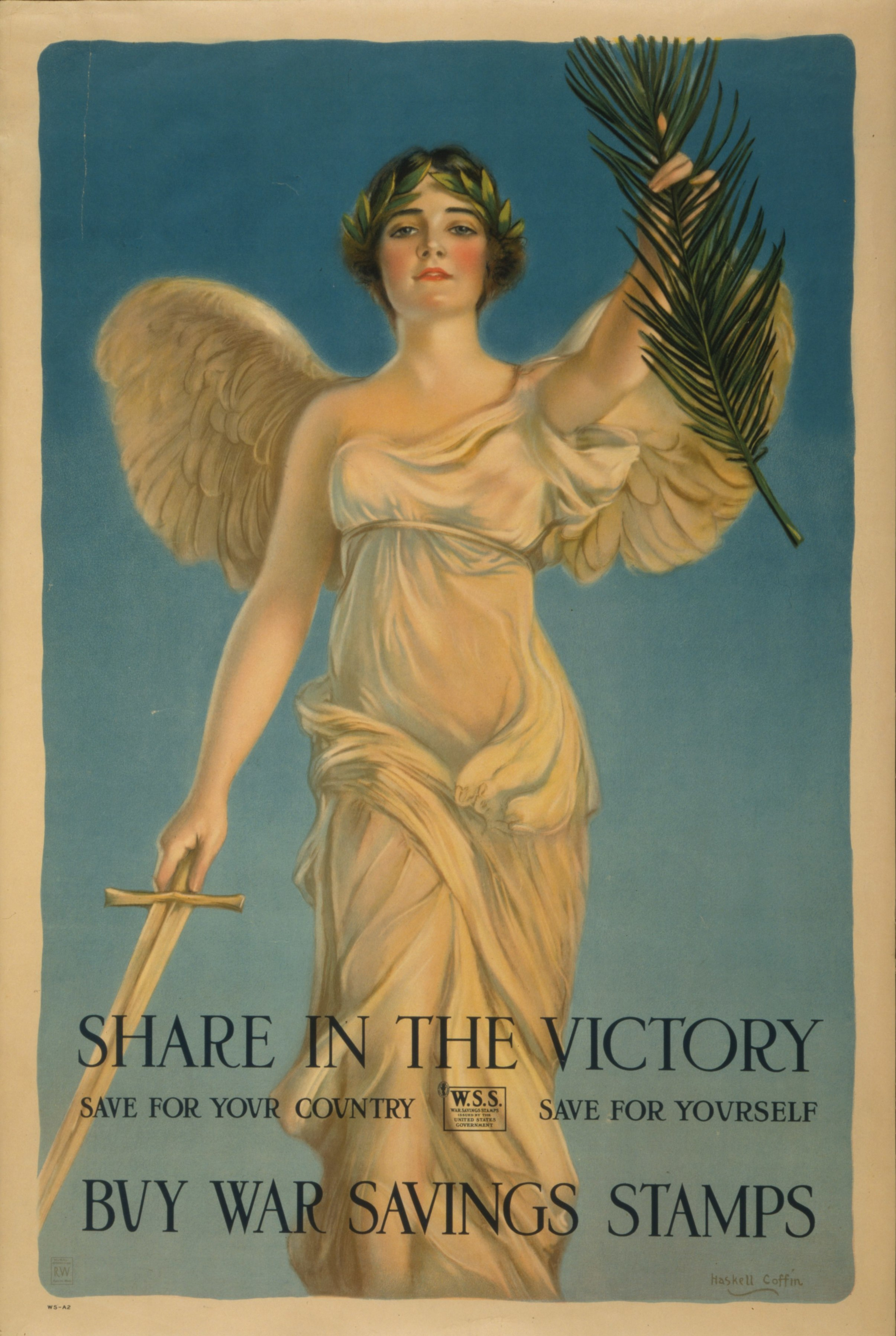
Share in the victory–Save for your country–Save for yourself (1918)

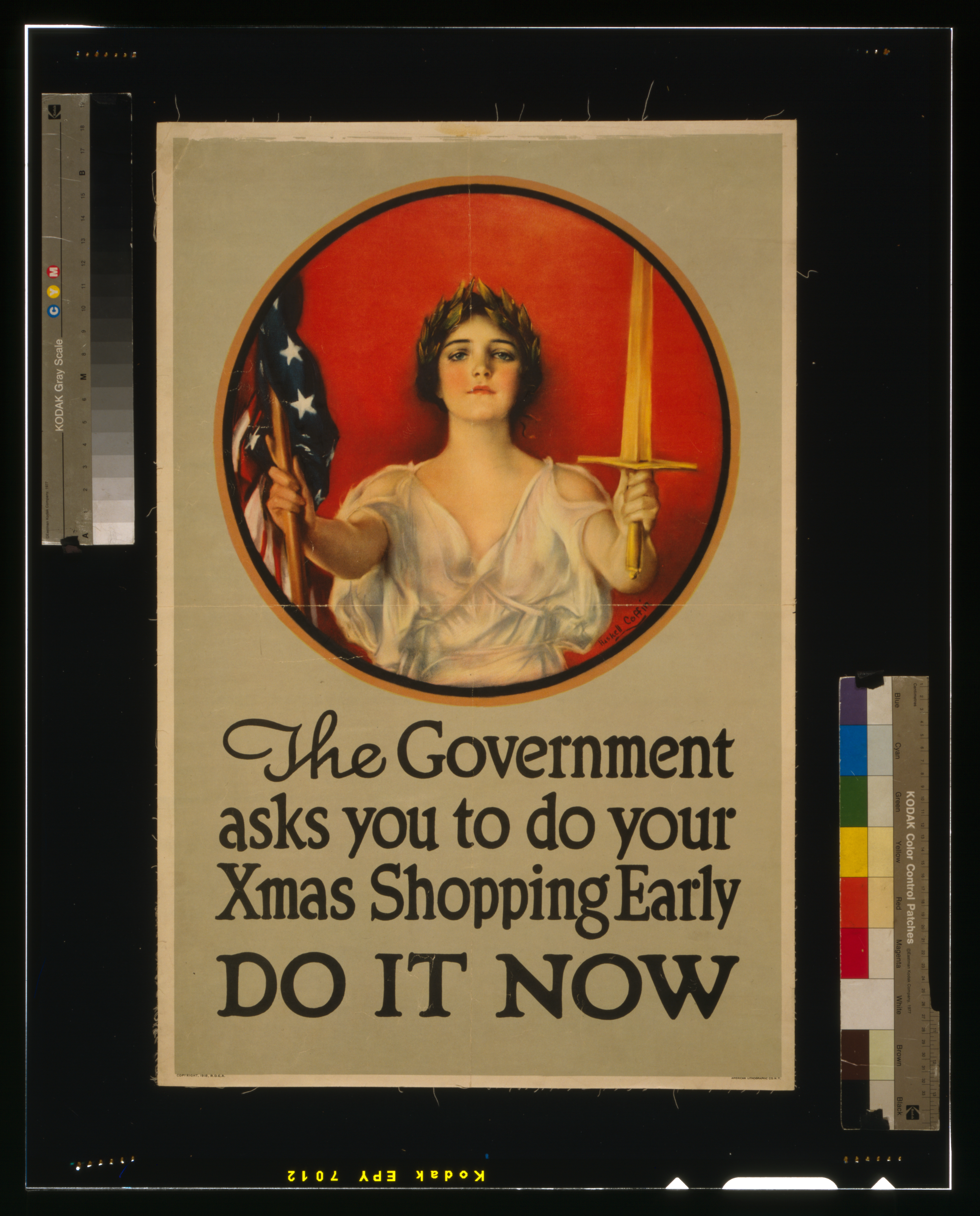
The government asks you to do your Xmas shopping early–Do it now (1918)

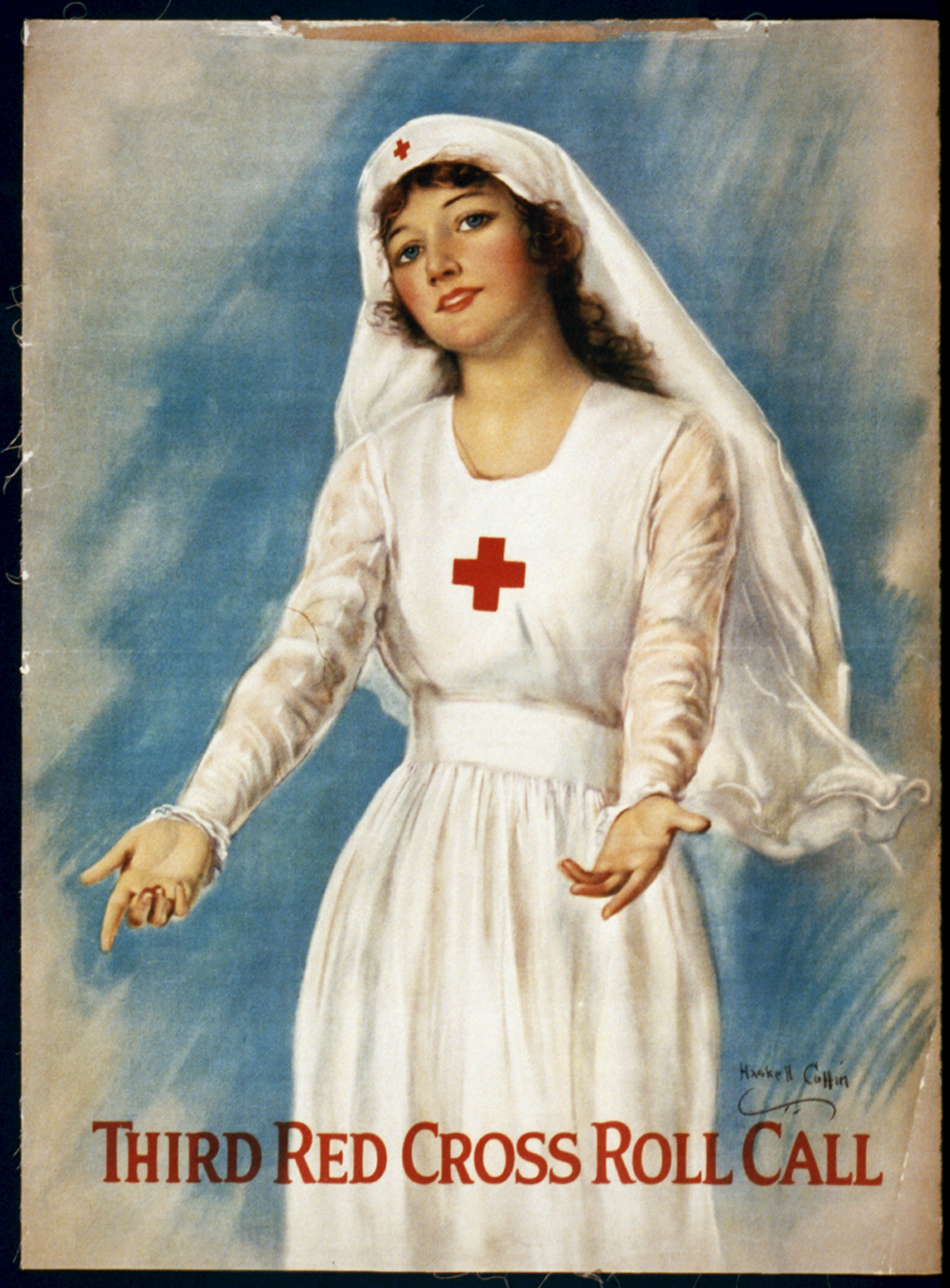
Third Red Cross roll call

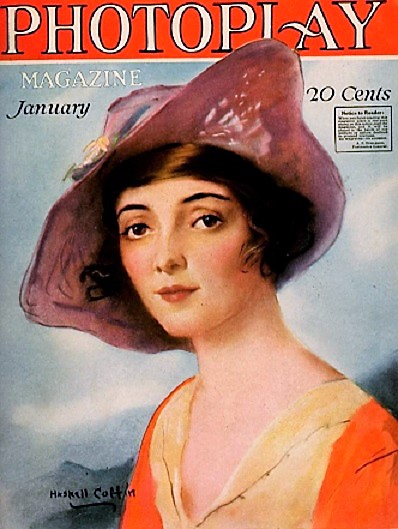

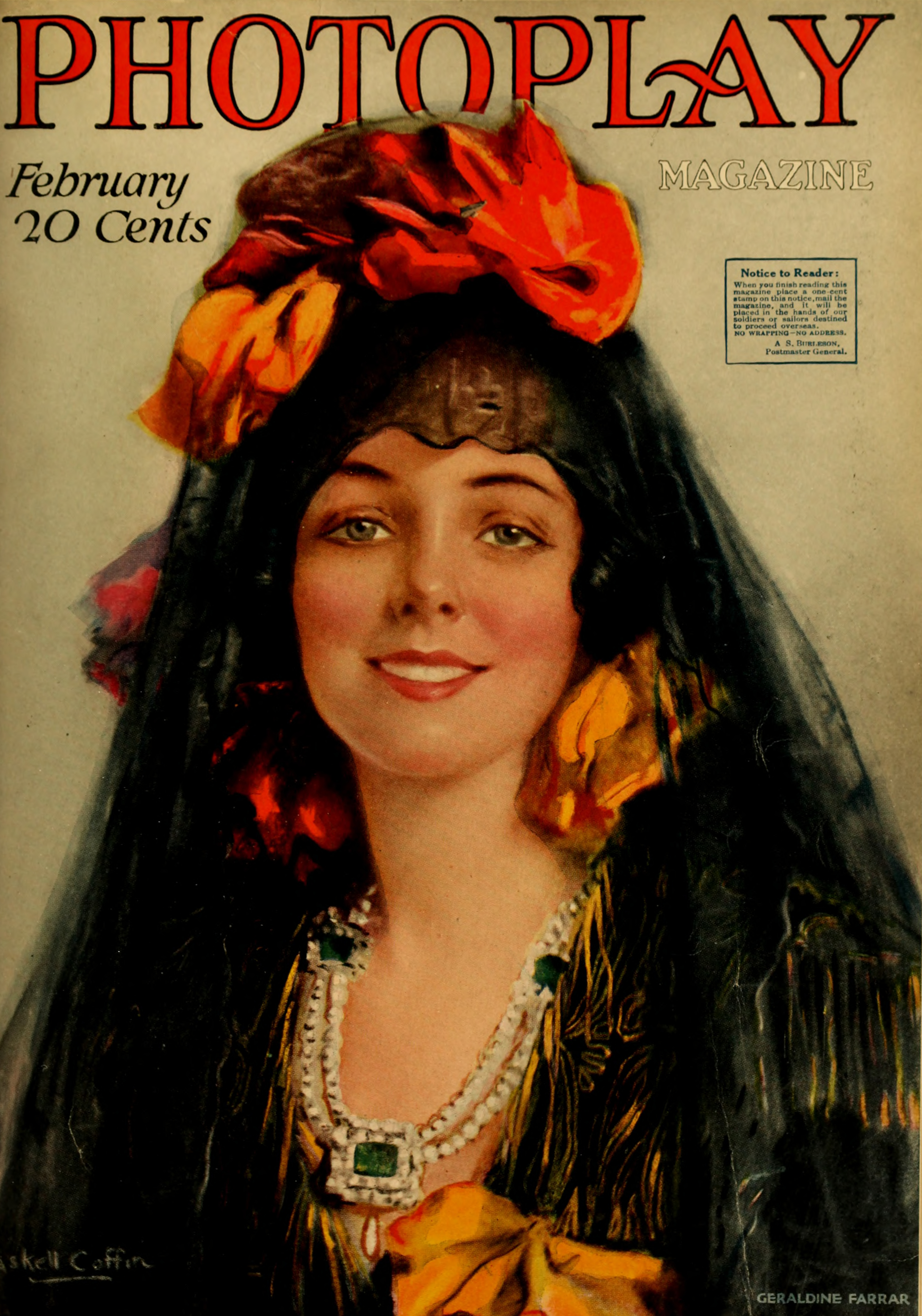

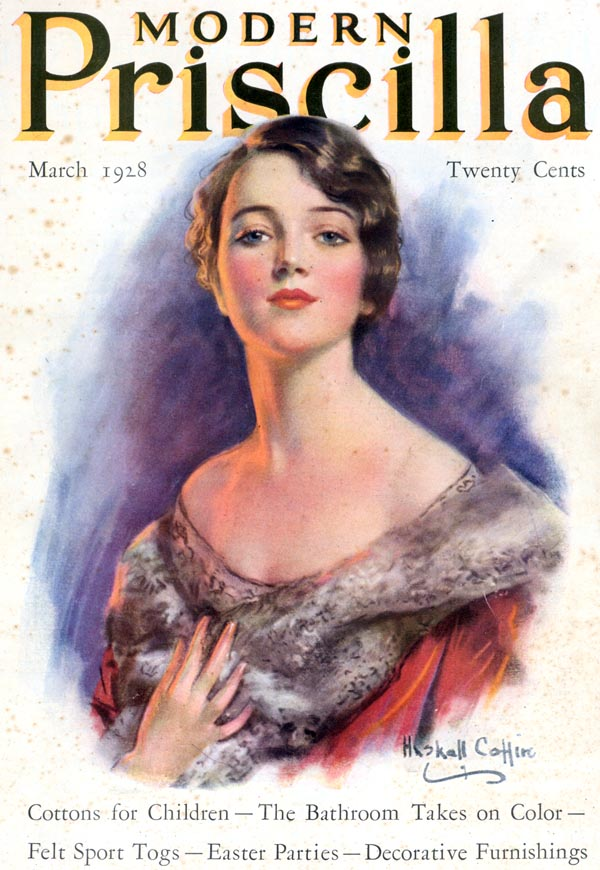

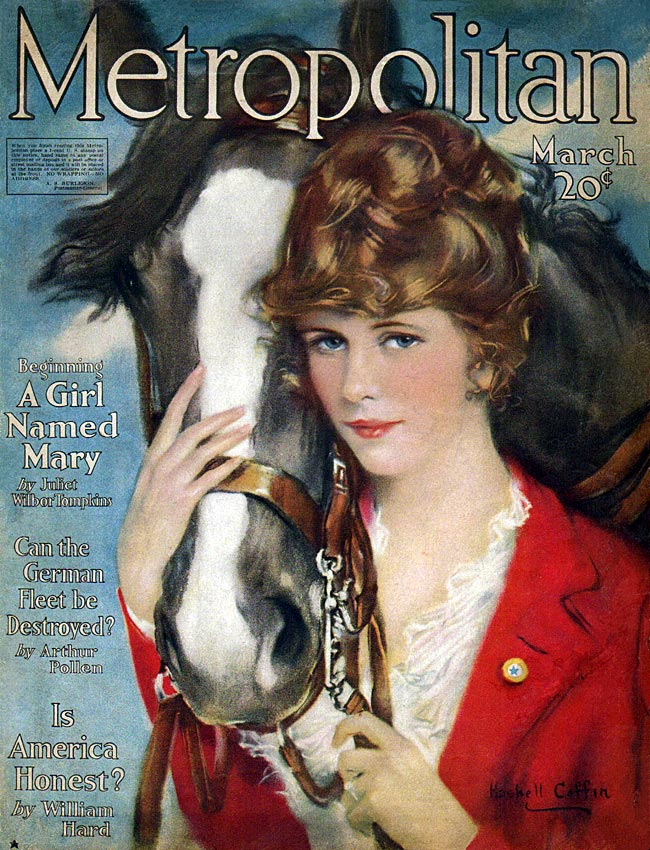

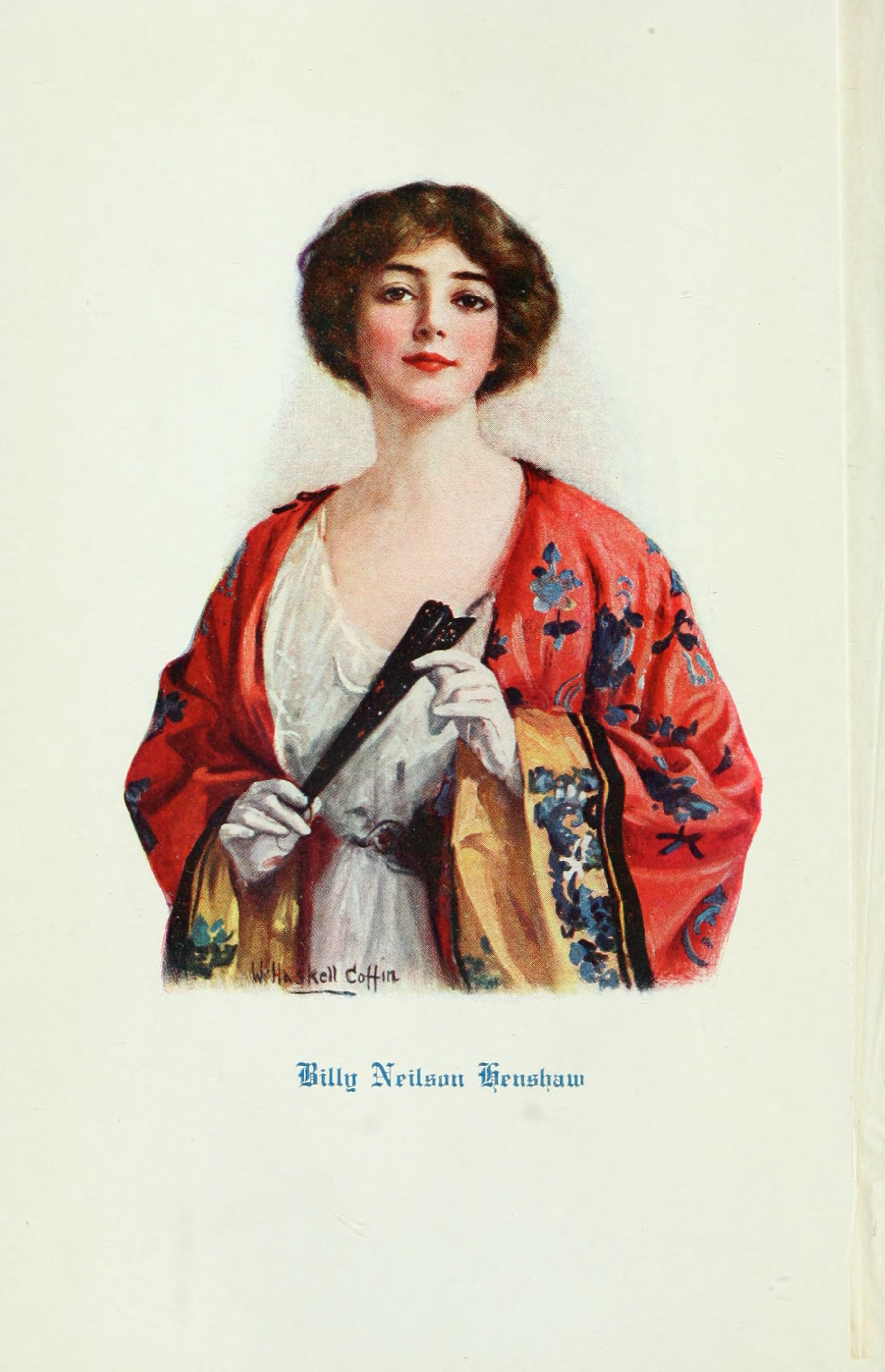

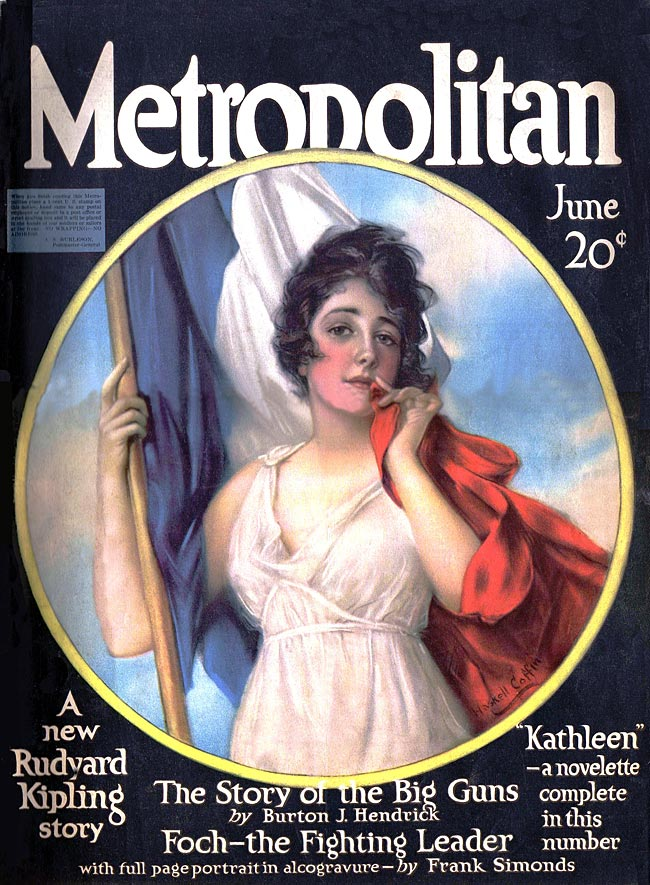

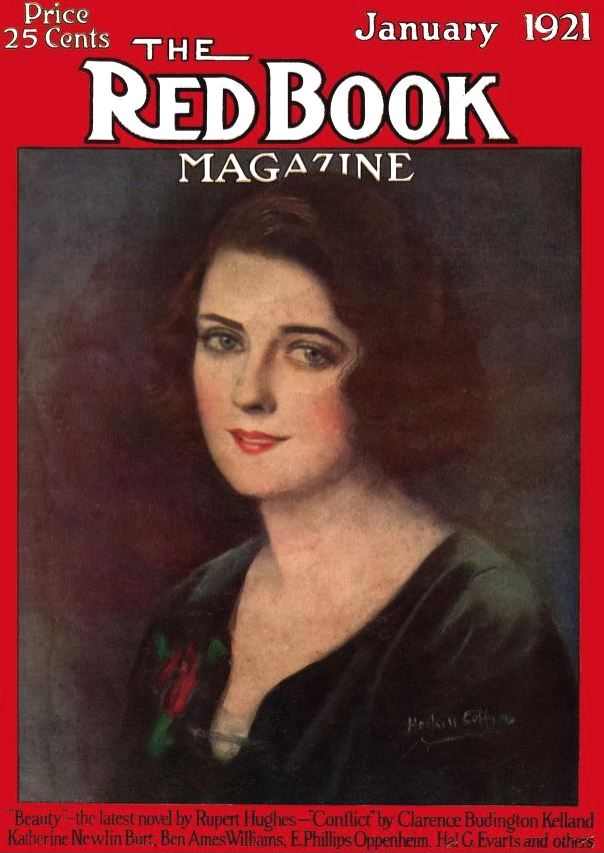

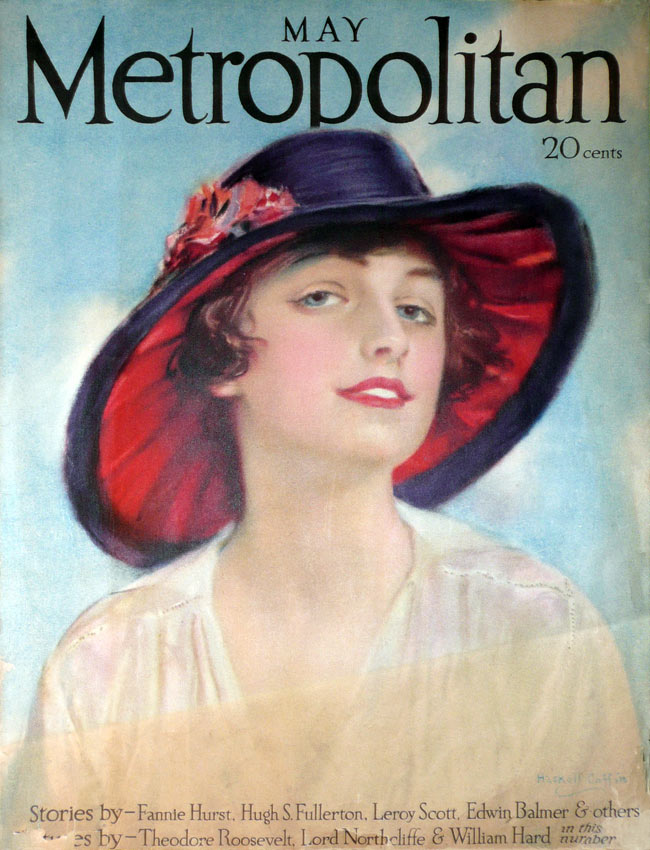

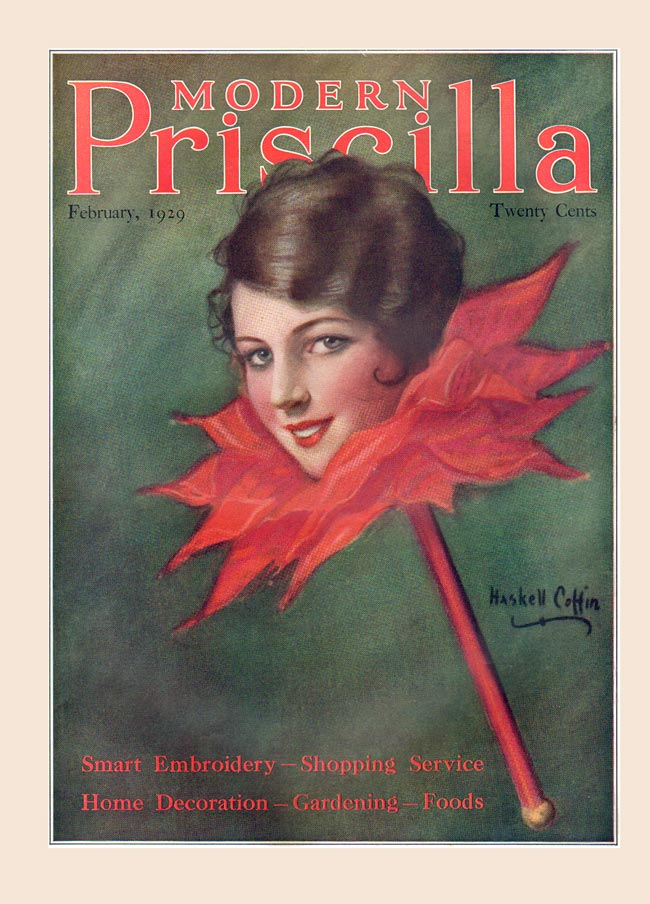

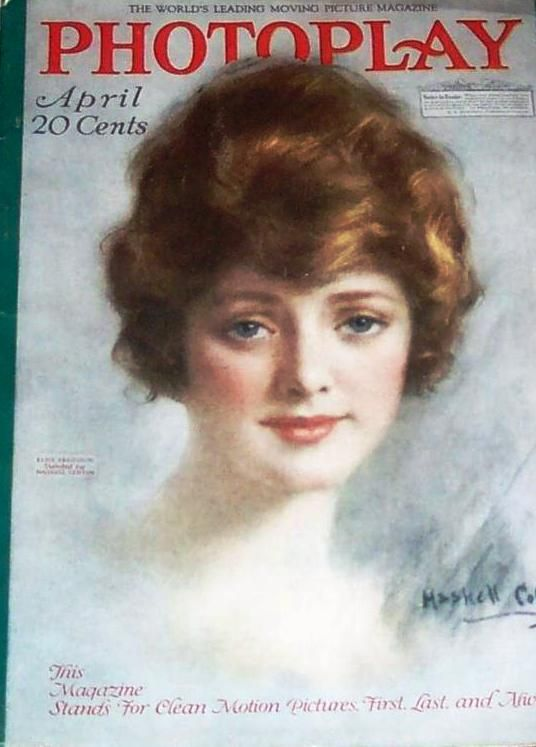

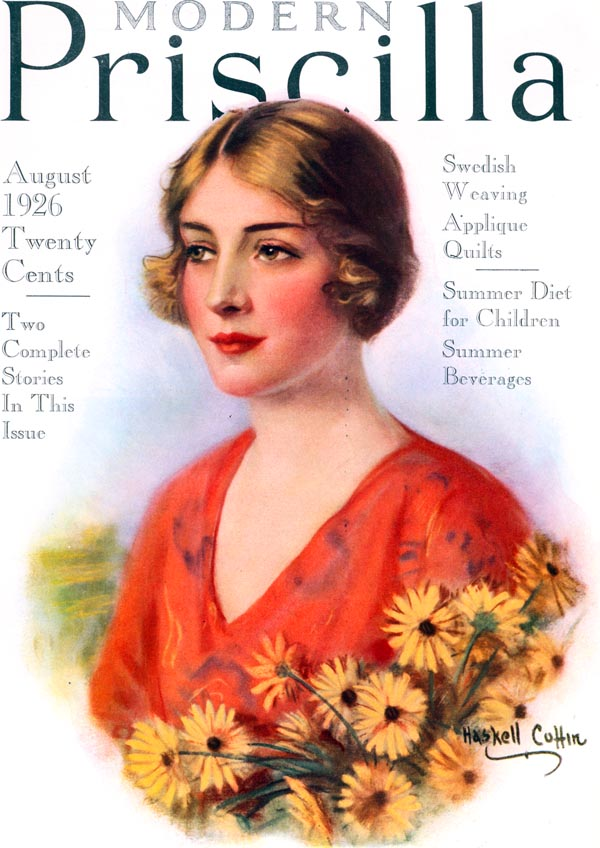

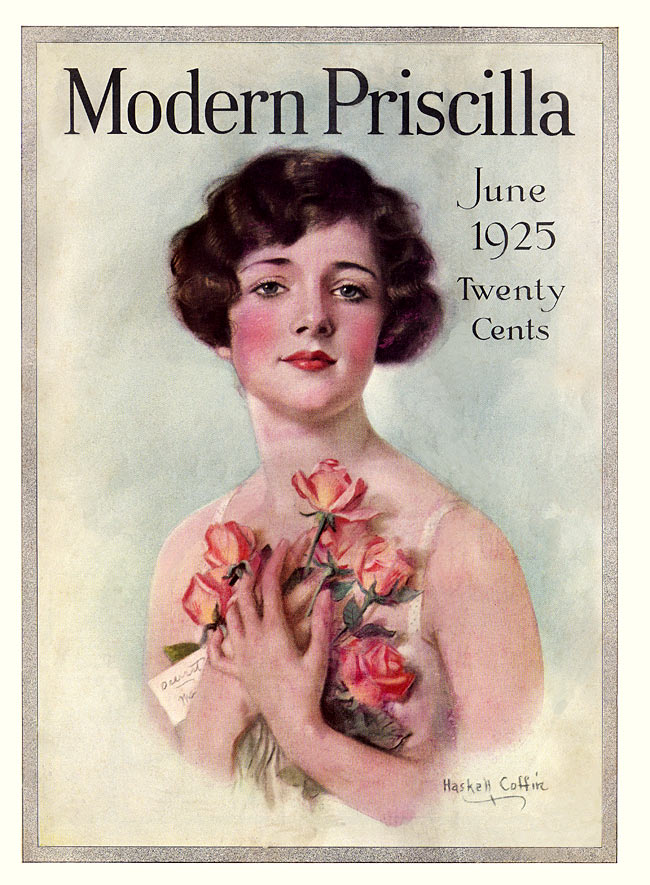

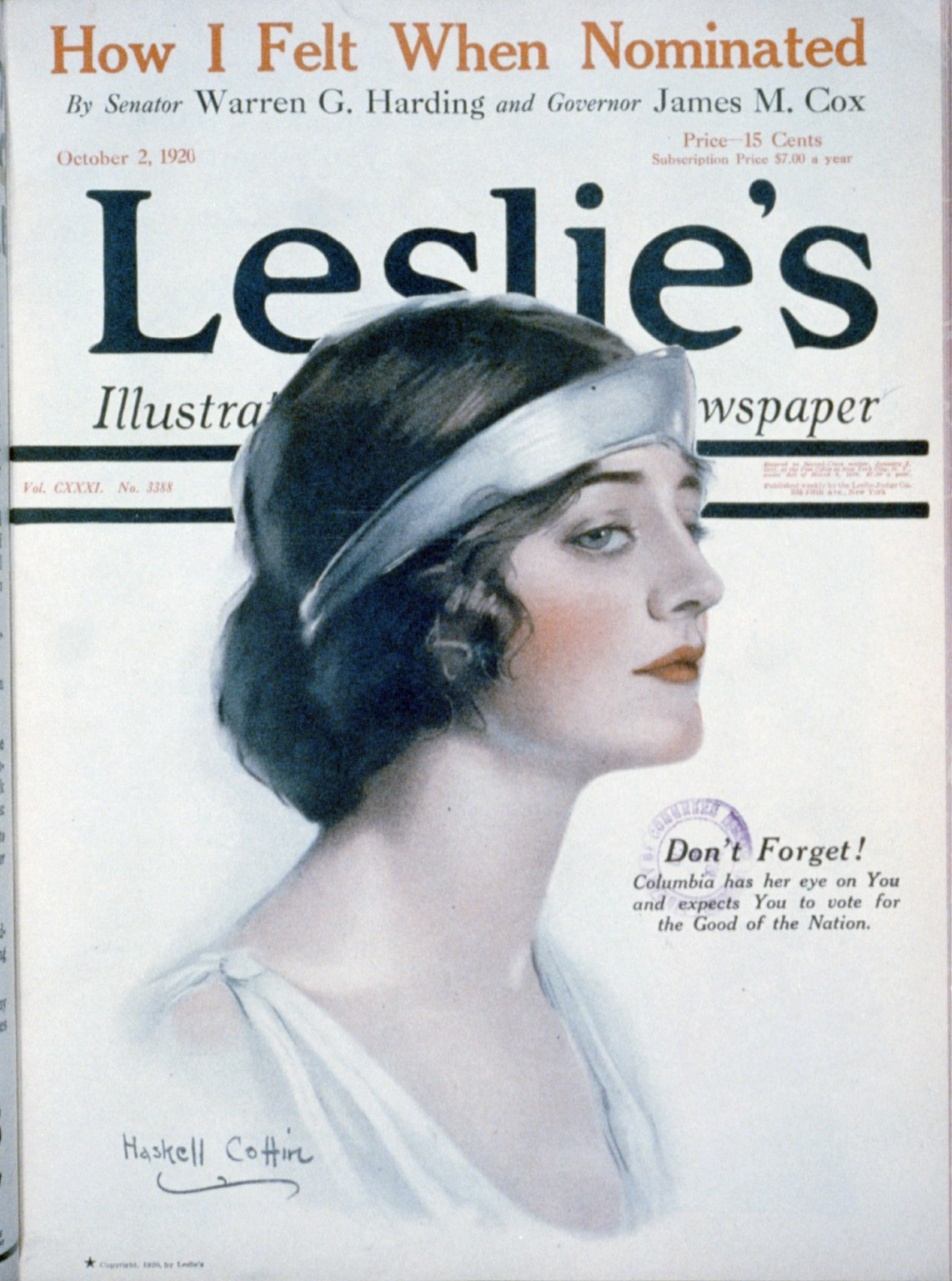

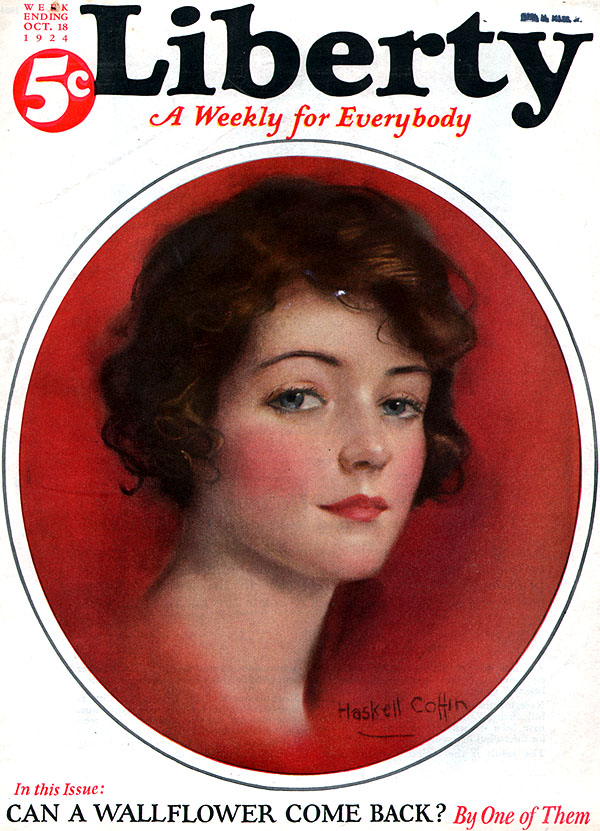

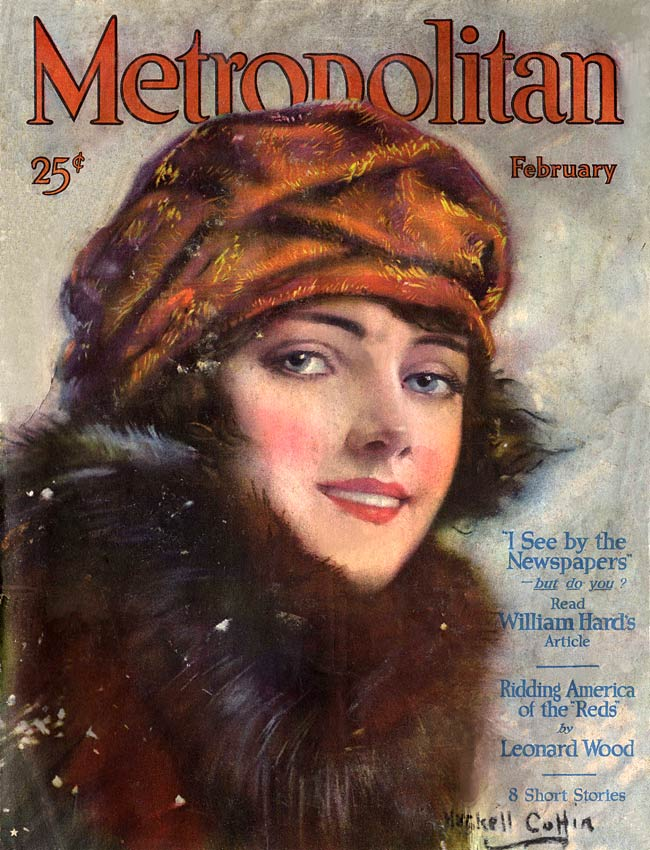

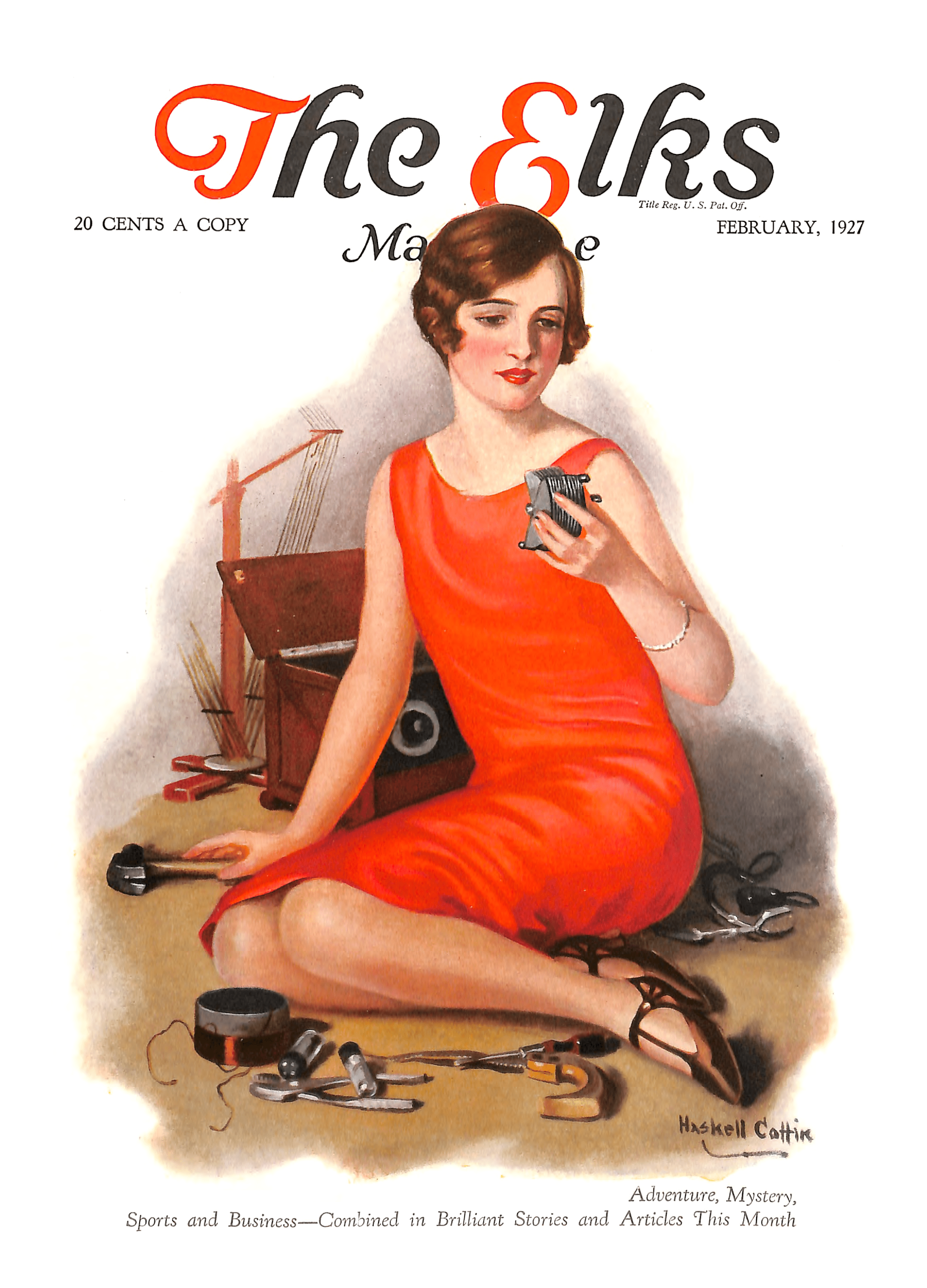

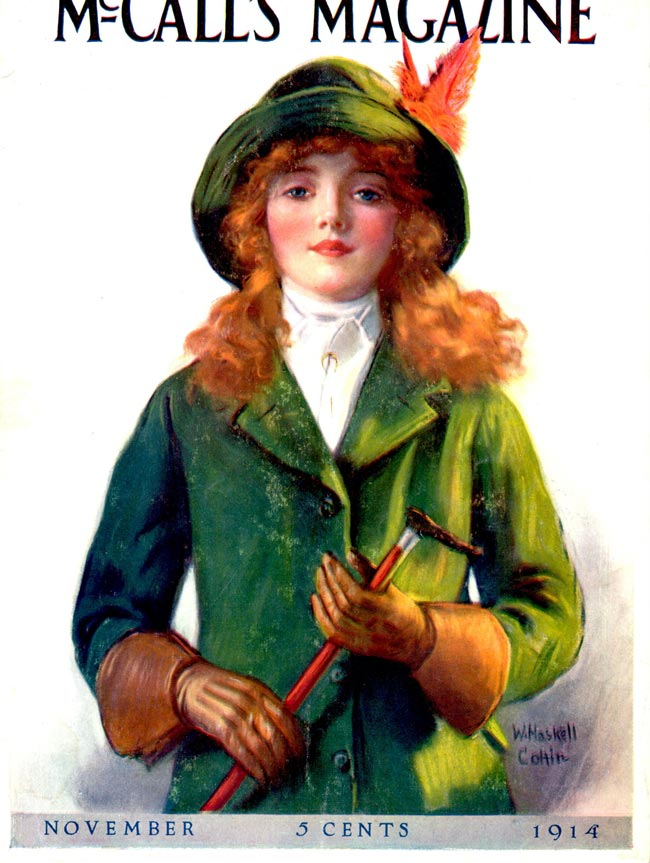

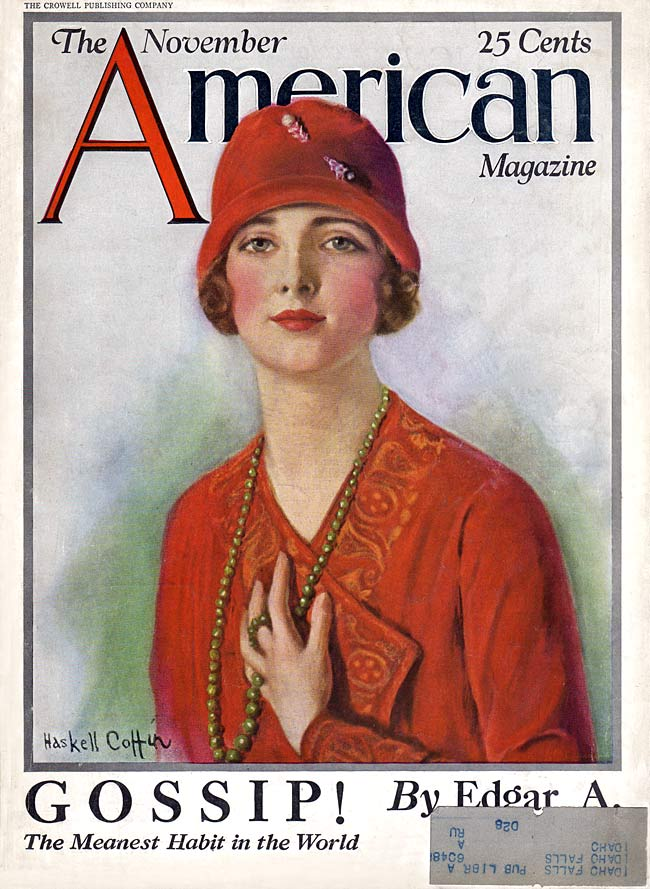

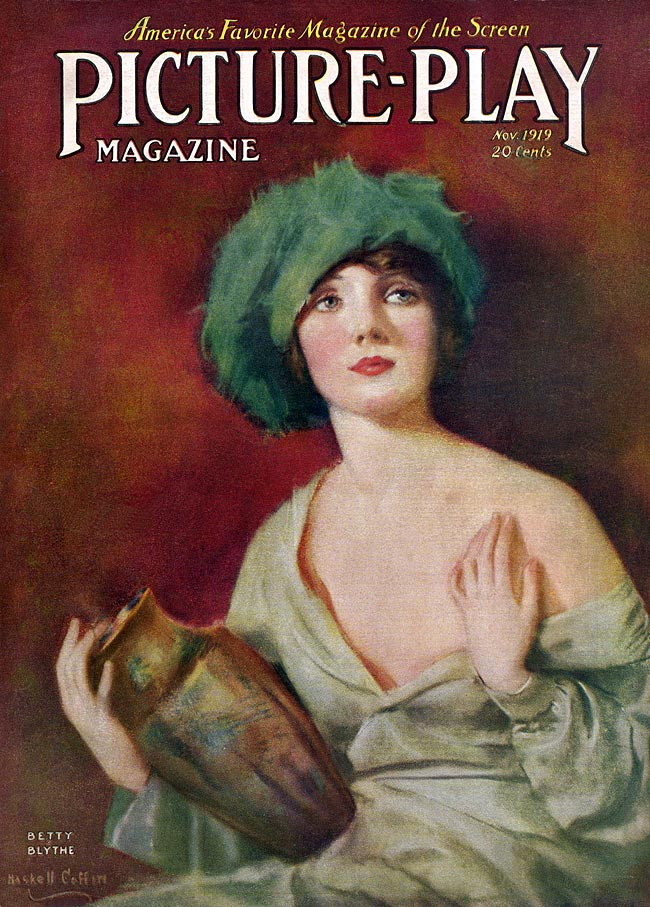

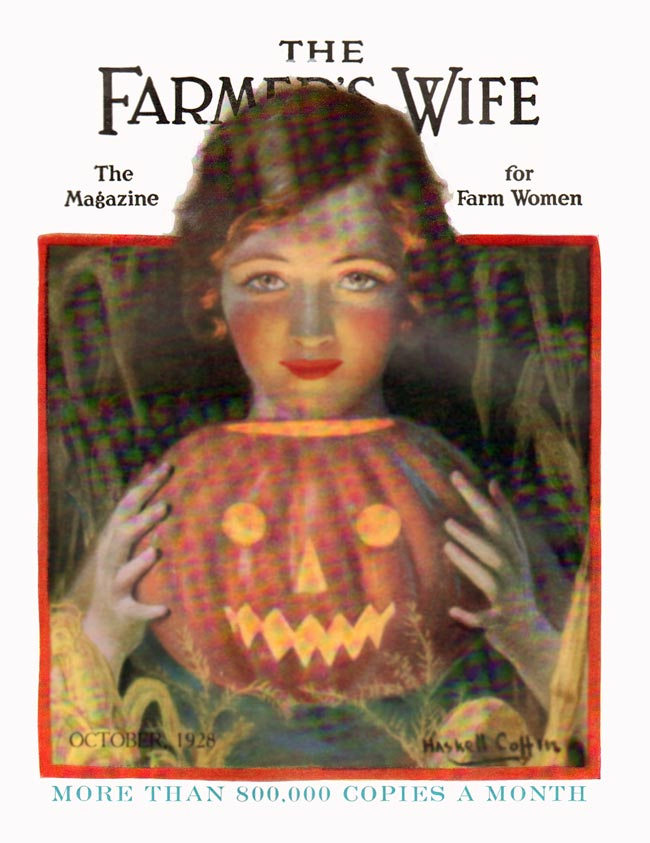

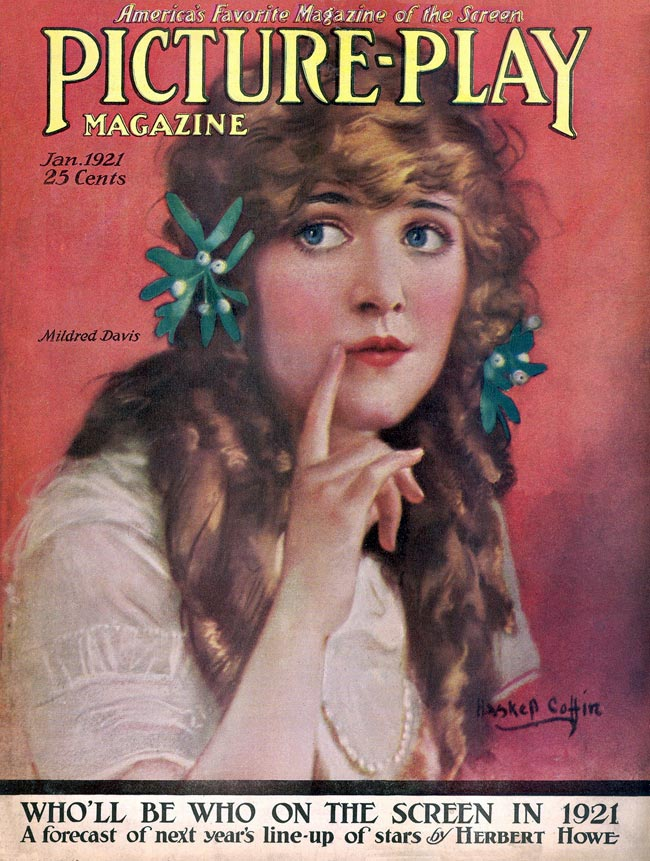

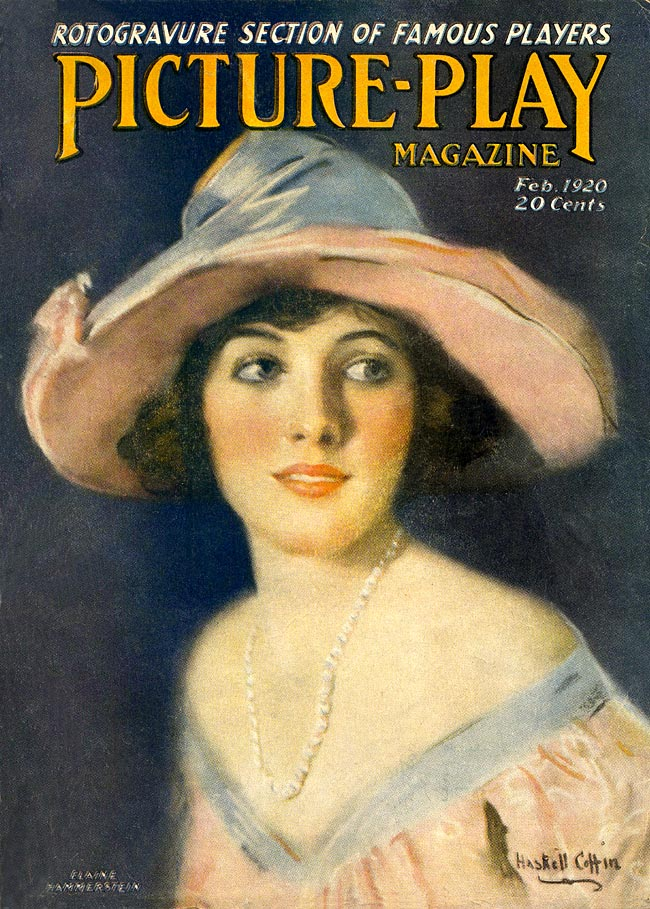

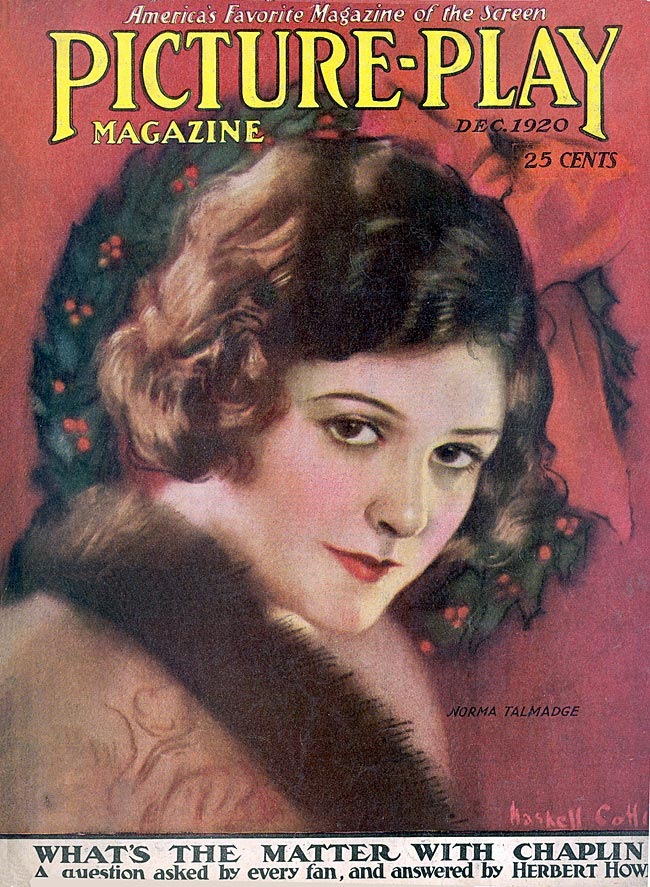

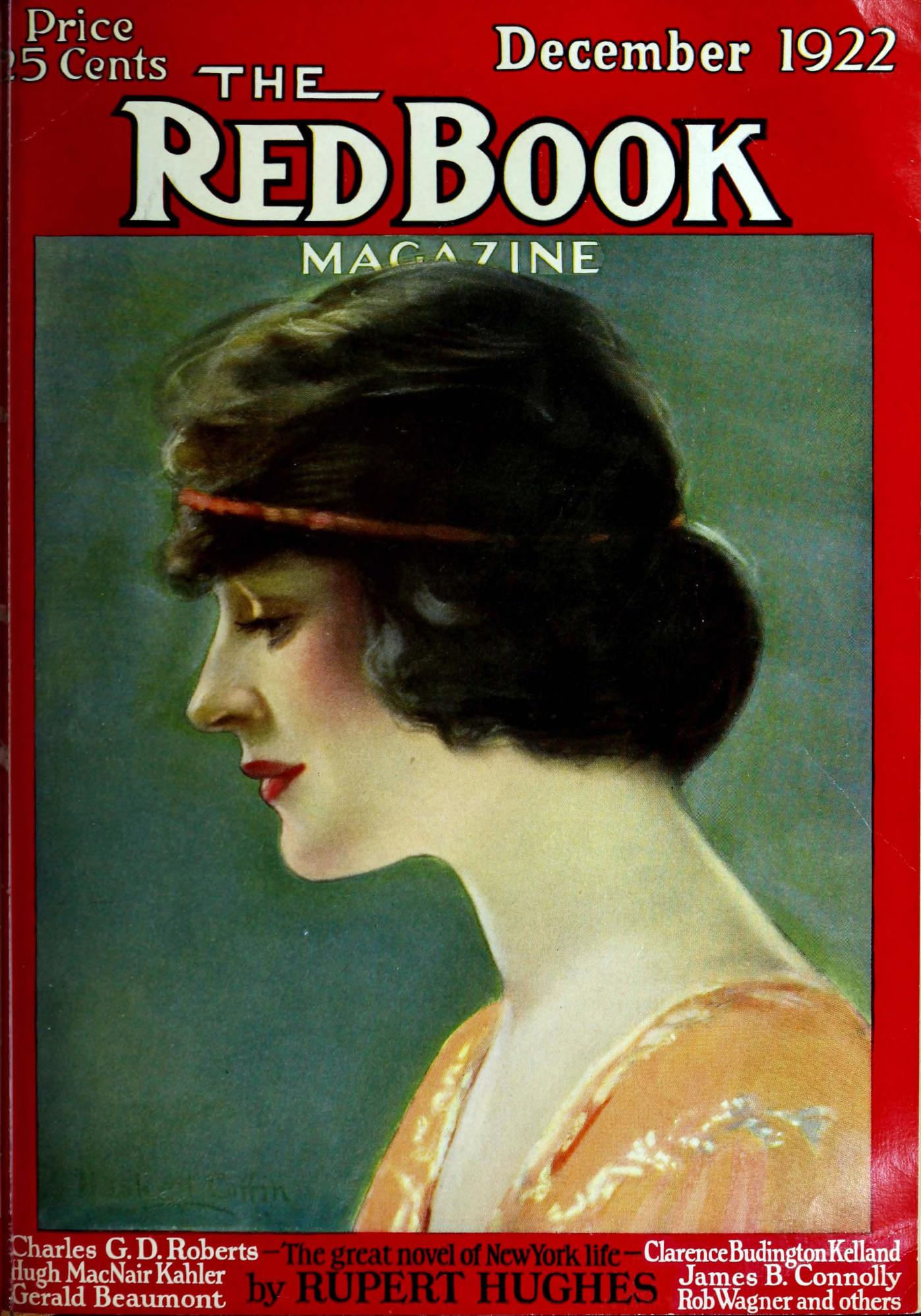

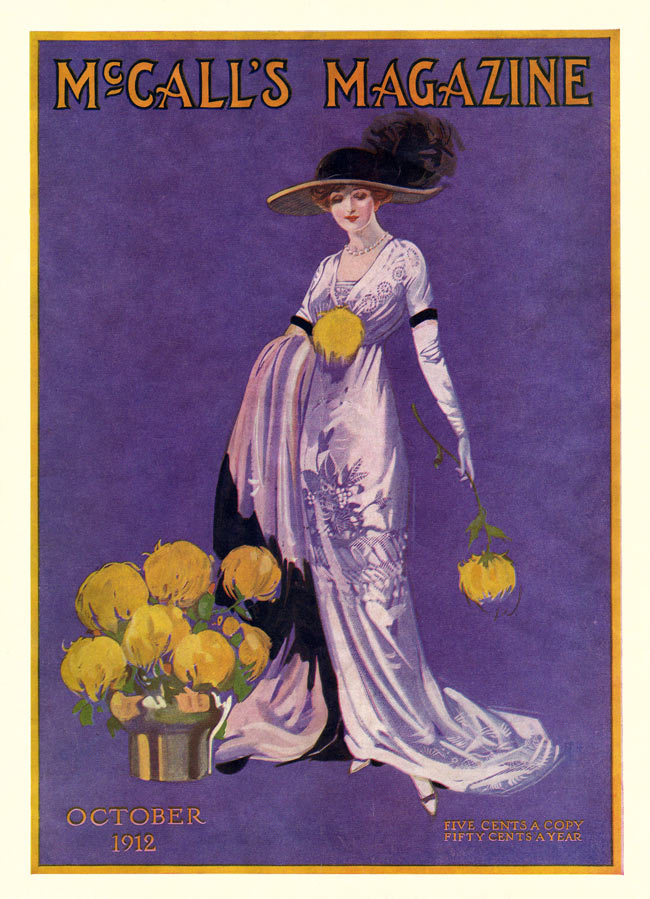

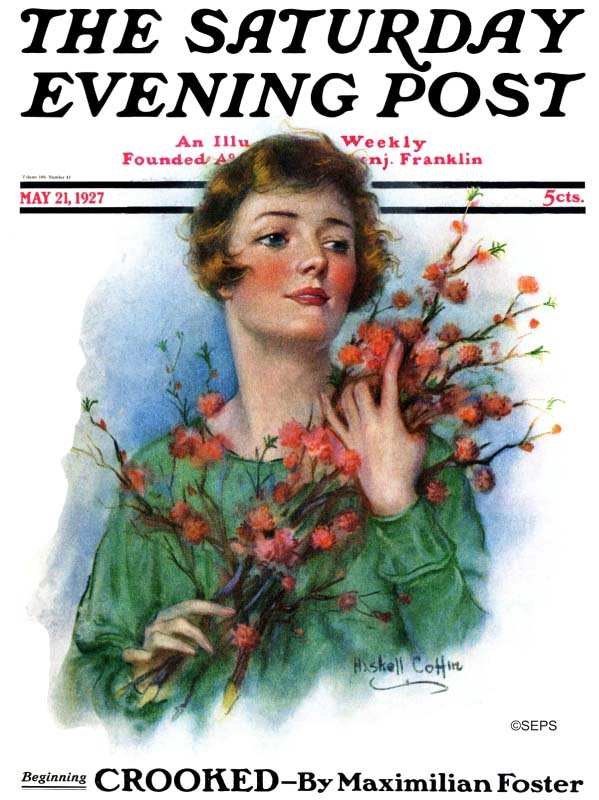

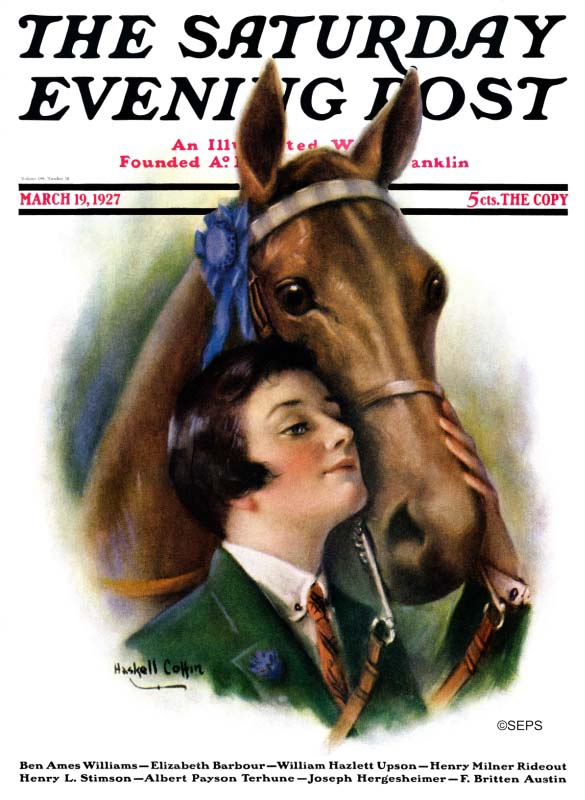

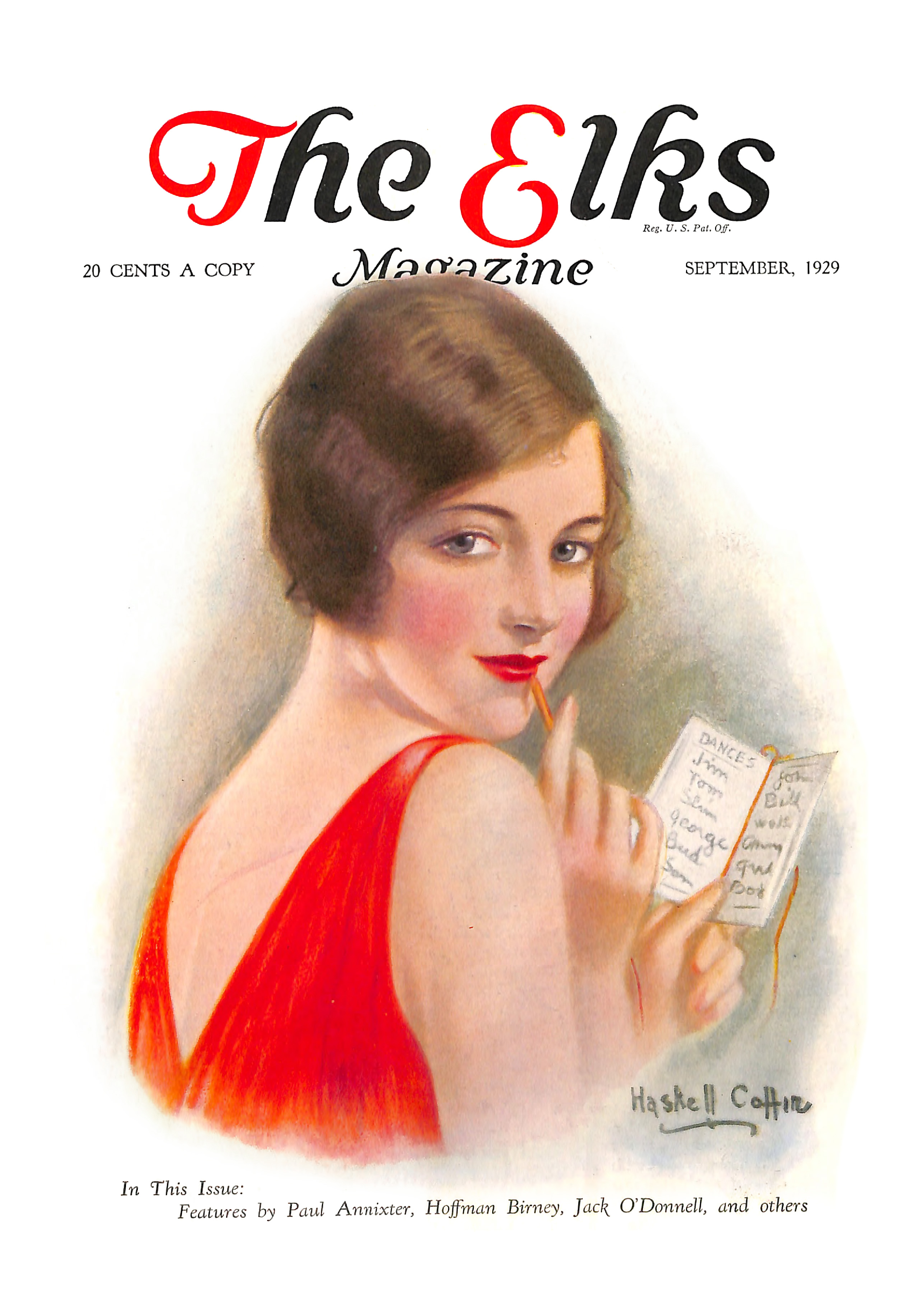

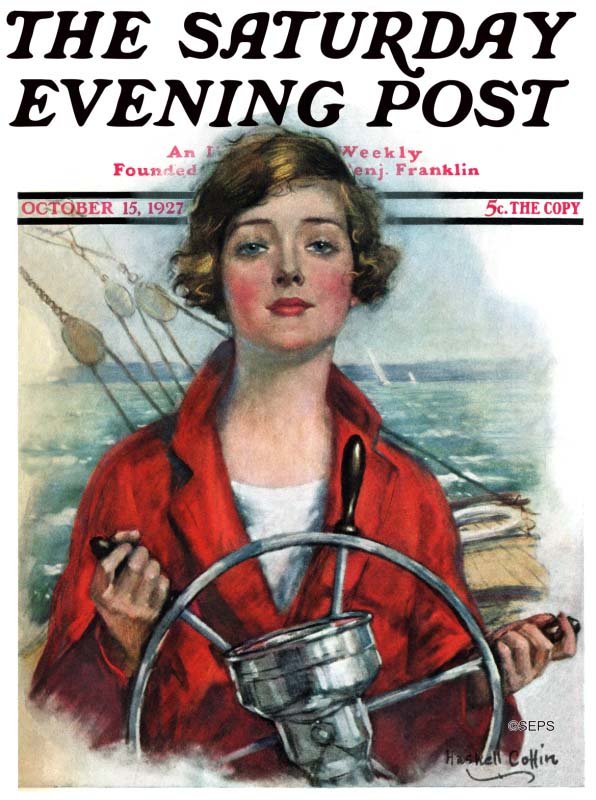

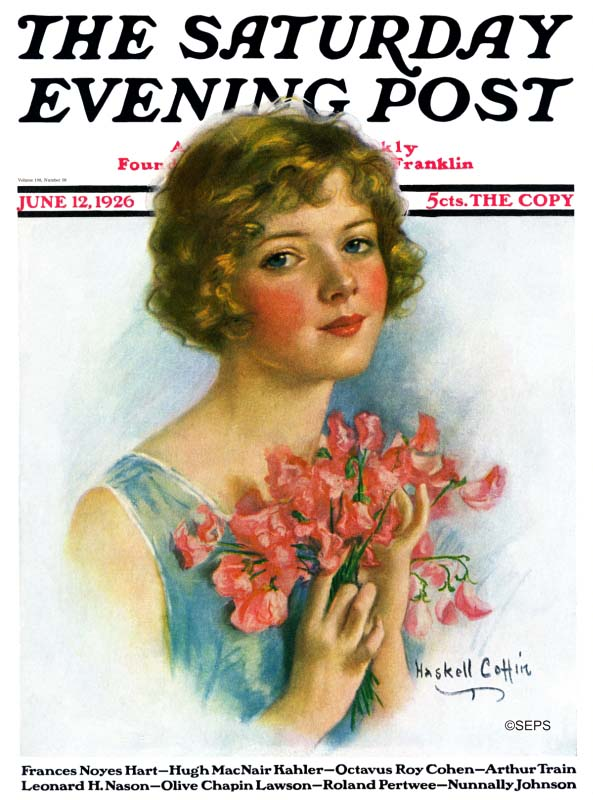

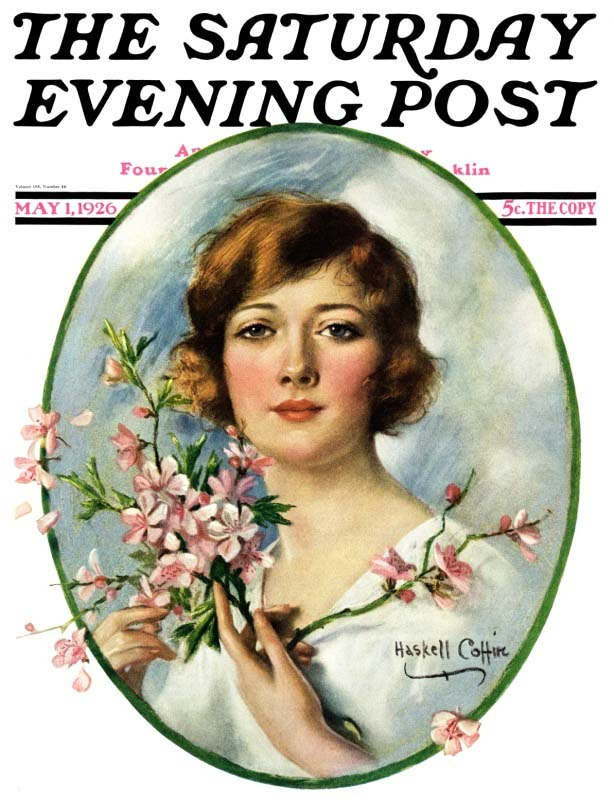

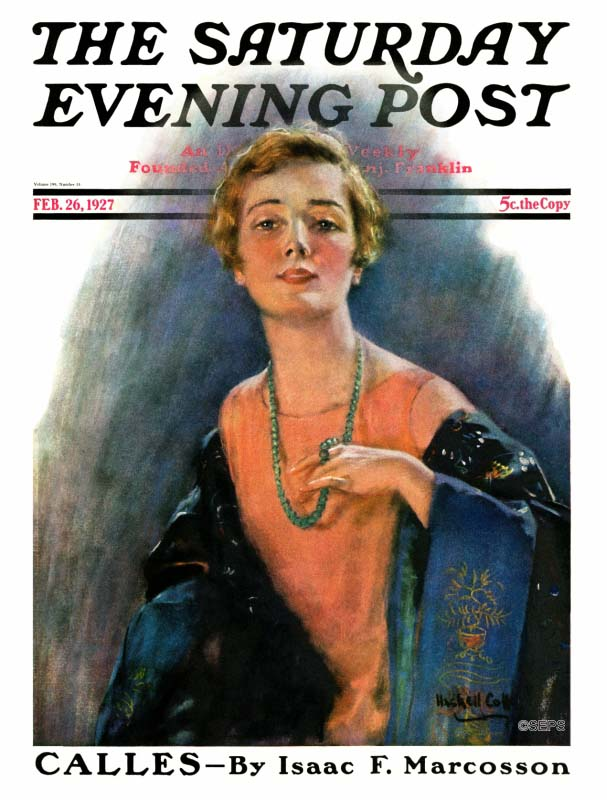
