= Wild Justice (1925 film) =

1925 film

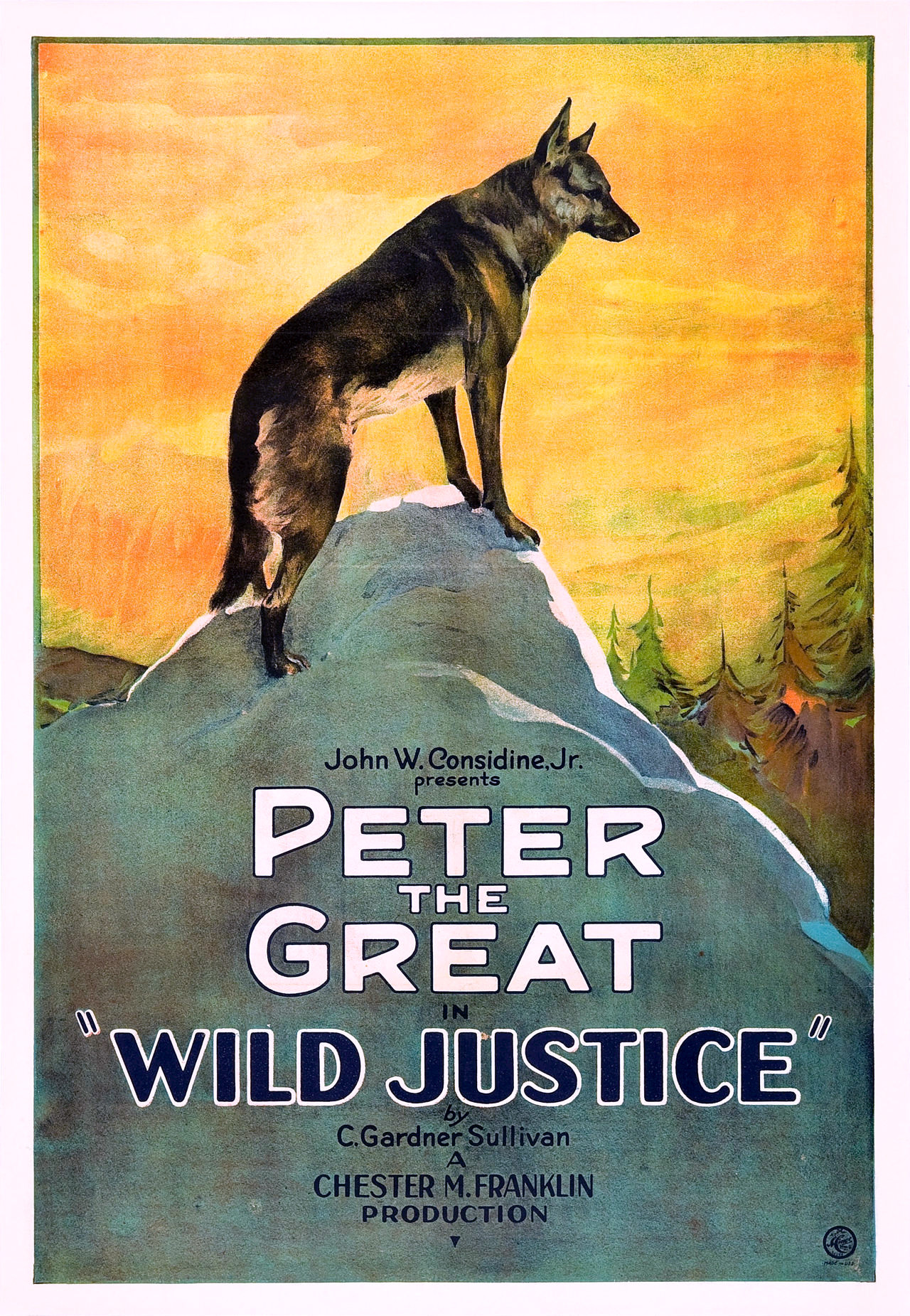
- Theatrical release poster
- Directed by: Chester Franklin
- Screenplay by: C. Gardner Sullivan
- Story by: C. Gardner Sullivan
- Produced by: John W. Considine Jr.
- Starring: Peter the Great; George Sherwood; Frank Hagney; Frances Teague
- Cinematography: Ray Binger
- Edited by: Hal C. Kern
- Production company: United Artists
- Distributed by: United Artists
- Release date: July 6, 1925
- Running time: 63 minutes
- Country: United States
- Language: Silent (English intertitles)

Wild Justice is a 1925 American silent adventure film directed by Chester Franklin and written by C. Gardner Sullivan. The film stars Peter the Great, George Sherwood, Frank Hagney, and Frances Teague. The film was released on July 6, 1925, by United Artists.

== Plot ==
As described in a film magazine reviews, Bob Blake kills the prospector, Hadley, and seizes his cabin. The dog Arno, Hadley’s pal, hates Blake and Blake sells him to Dr. Dave Wright. Hadley’s daughter Polly Ann arrives and Blake attacks her. Dr. Wright rescues the young woman, and in revenge Blake stirs the settlers against the doctor as the killer of Hadley. Dr. Wright proves his innocence and forces a confession from Blake.

== Cast ==
- Peter the Great as Arno, a Dog
- George Sherwood as Dr. Dave Wright
- Frank Hagney as Bob Blake
- Frances Teague as Polly Ann Hadley

== Preservation ==
With no prints of Wild Justice located in any film archives, it is a lost film.
