= The Massacre (film) =

1912 film

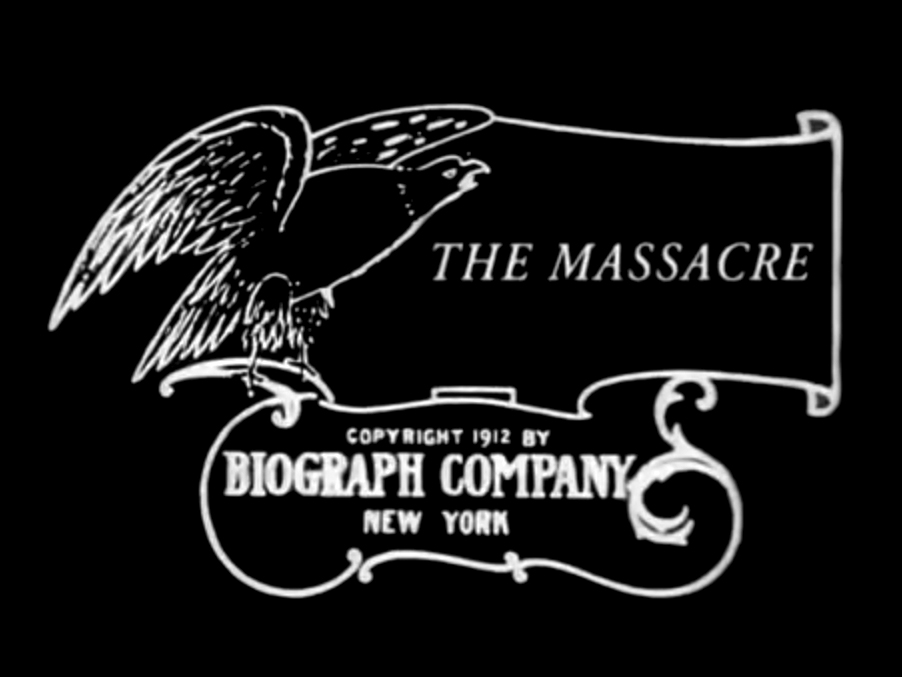
- Title card
- Directed by: D. W. Griffith
- Written by: D. W. Griffith (story, scenario)
- Produced by: American Mutoscope and Biograph Company
- Starring: Wilfred Lucas; Blanche Sweet
- Cinematography: G. W. Bitzer
- Distributed by: General Film Company
- Release dates: November 7, 1912 (Europe); February 26, 1914 (U.S.)
- Running time: 2 reels (30 minutes)
- Country: United States
- Language: Silent (English intertitles)

The Massacre is a 1912 American silent Western film directed by D. W. Griffith and released by Biograph Studios. It stars Blanche Sweet and Wilfred Lucas. The film was shot in 1912 and released in Europe that year, but not released in the United States until 1914.

Full film

== Cast ==
- Wilfred Lucas as Stephen
- Blanche Sweet as Stephen's ward
- Charles West as Stephen's ward's husband
- Alfred Paget as Indian Chief
- Lionel Barrymore
- Charles Craig
- Edward Dillon as John Randolph, In the Prologue/and in the Cavalry
- Charles Gorman as In Cavalry
- Robert Harron as In Cavalry
- Dell Henderson as In Wagon Train
- Harry Hyde as In Wagon Train
- J. Jiquel Lanoe as In Wagon Train
- Charles Hill Mailes as In Wagon Train
- Claire McDowell as Stephen's Belle, In Prologue
- W. Chrystie Miller as In Wagon Train
- Frank Opperman as Old Settler
- Jack Pickford as Young Boy
- W. C. Robinson as Amongst the Indians
- Kate Toncray as Maid, in Prologue
