= Death's Marathon =

1913 American silent film

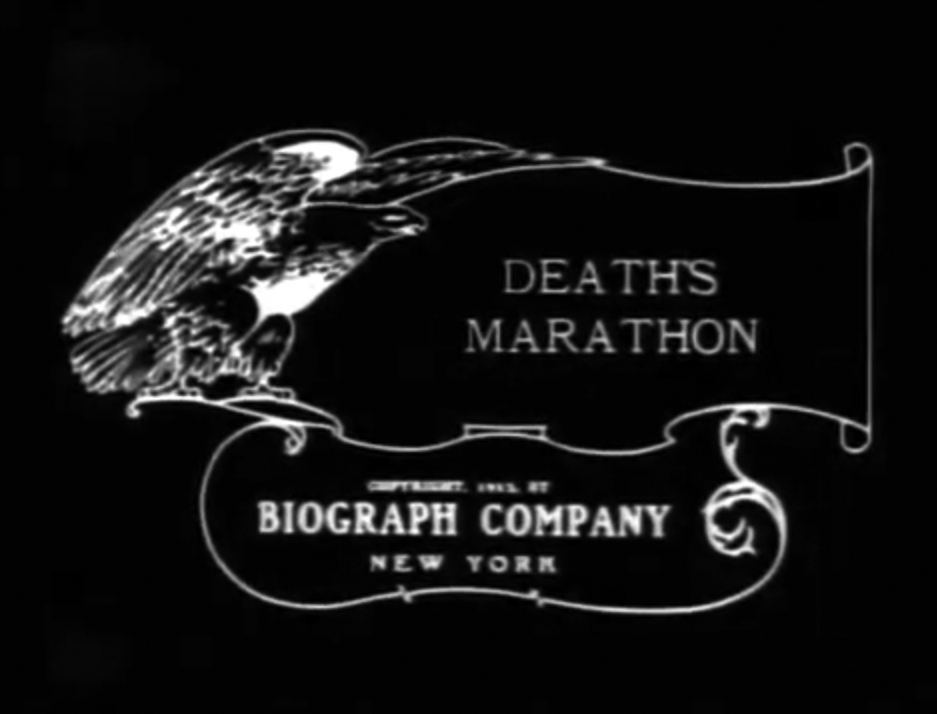
- Title card
- Directed by: D. W. Griffith
- Written by: William E. Wing
- Starring: Blanche Sweet; Henry B. Walthall; Lionel Barrymore
- Cinematography: G. W. Bitzer
- Distributed by: Biograph Company; General Film Company
- Release date: June 14, 1913 (U.S.)
- Running time: 2 reels; (17 mins @ 16fps)
- Country: United States
- Language: Silent (English intertitles)

Death's Marathon is a 1913 American silent film short directed by D. W. Griffith and distributed by Biograph. It stars Blanche Sweet and Henry B. Walthall and was filmed in the Los Angeles area. This film survives and is available on DVD.

Death's Marathon (1913)

== Cast ==
- Blanche Sweet as the wife
- Henry B. Walthall as the husband
- Walter Miller as the friend, the husband's partner
- Lionel Barrymore as the financial backer
- Kate Bruce as the nanny
- Robert Harron as the messenger

=== Uncredited ===
- William J. Butler as man at club
- Harry Hyde as a friend at club
- J. Jiquel Lanoe as man at club
- Adolph Lestina as man at club
- Charles Hill Mailes
- Alfred Paget as a gambler at club
- W. C. Robinson as man at club
