= As It Is In Life =

1910 silent short drama film by D. W. Griffith

As It Is in Life
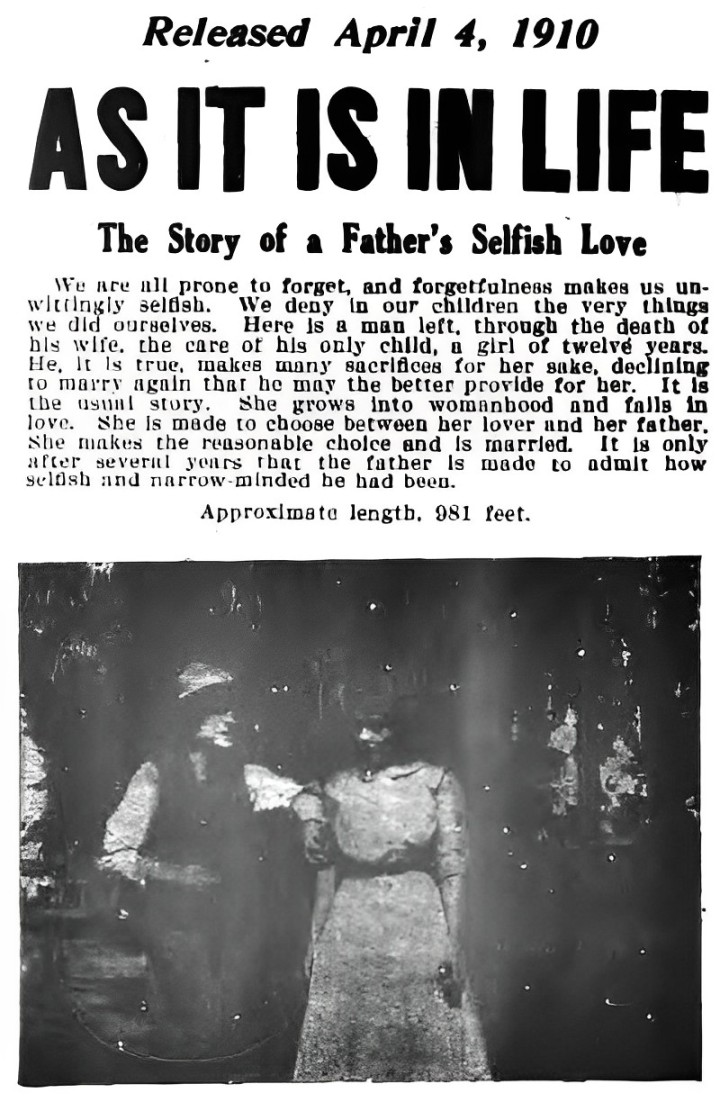
- Directed by: D. W. Griffith
- Written by: Stanner E. V. Taylor
- Produced by: Biograph Company
- Starring: Mary Pickford; George Nichols; Gladys Egan
- Cinematography: Billy Bitzer
- Distributed by: Biograph Company
- Release date: April 4, 1910
- Running time: 16 minutes
- Country: U.S.
- Language: Silent (English intertitles)

As It Is in Life is a 1910 silent short film directed by D. W. Griffith and produced and distributed by the Biograph Company. Mary Pickford appears in the film.

The film is preserved from Library of Congress paper prints.

== Plot ==
The film starts out with an intertitle stating, 'The Mother is Gone'. The father, named George Forrester, works at a pigeon farm. The daughter is very lonely when her dad leaves for work, so George brings his daughter to his work at the farm. George meets an old sweetheart, and they rekindle. Forrester lets the woman go for his daughter, because he can't support a wife and child. Years pass and the daughter is all grown up. She tells her dad that she will never leave him. Forrester and his daughter go for a walk along the beach and to the farm where he works. A young man catches the eye of the daughter. Forrester tells his daughter that she must choose between him and the young man. She ends up choosing the young man and they get married. George is bitter and doesn't go to the wedding or visit the couple. The daughter and the young man have a child and she brings it to her father in hopes he will notice. The father is delighted to see the child and he and his daughter reunite.

== Cast ==
- George Nichols as George Forrester
- Gladys Egan as George Forrester's Daughter (Young Girl)
- Mary Pickford as George Forrester's Daughter (Young Woman)
- Marion Leonard as George Forrester's Sweetheart
- Charles West as George Forrester's Son-in-Law
- Kate Bruce as the Maid
- William J. Butler
- W. Chrystie Miller as Man
- Anthony O'Sullivan as Farm Worker
- Frank Opperman as Companion of Daughter's Husband
- Mack Sennett as Owner of a Pigeon Farm (unconfirmed)

== Production ==
As It Is in Life was filmed on February 22, 1910, at a pigeon farm in Edendale, California. The same location was also used for another Griffith film, A Rich Revenge.

== See also ==
- List of American films of 1910
