= The Unchanging Sea =

1910 film directed by D. W. Griffith

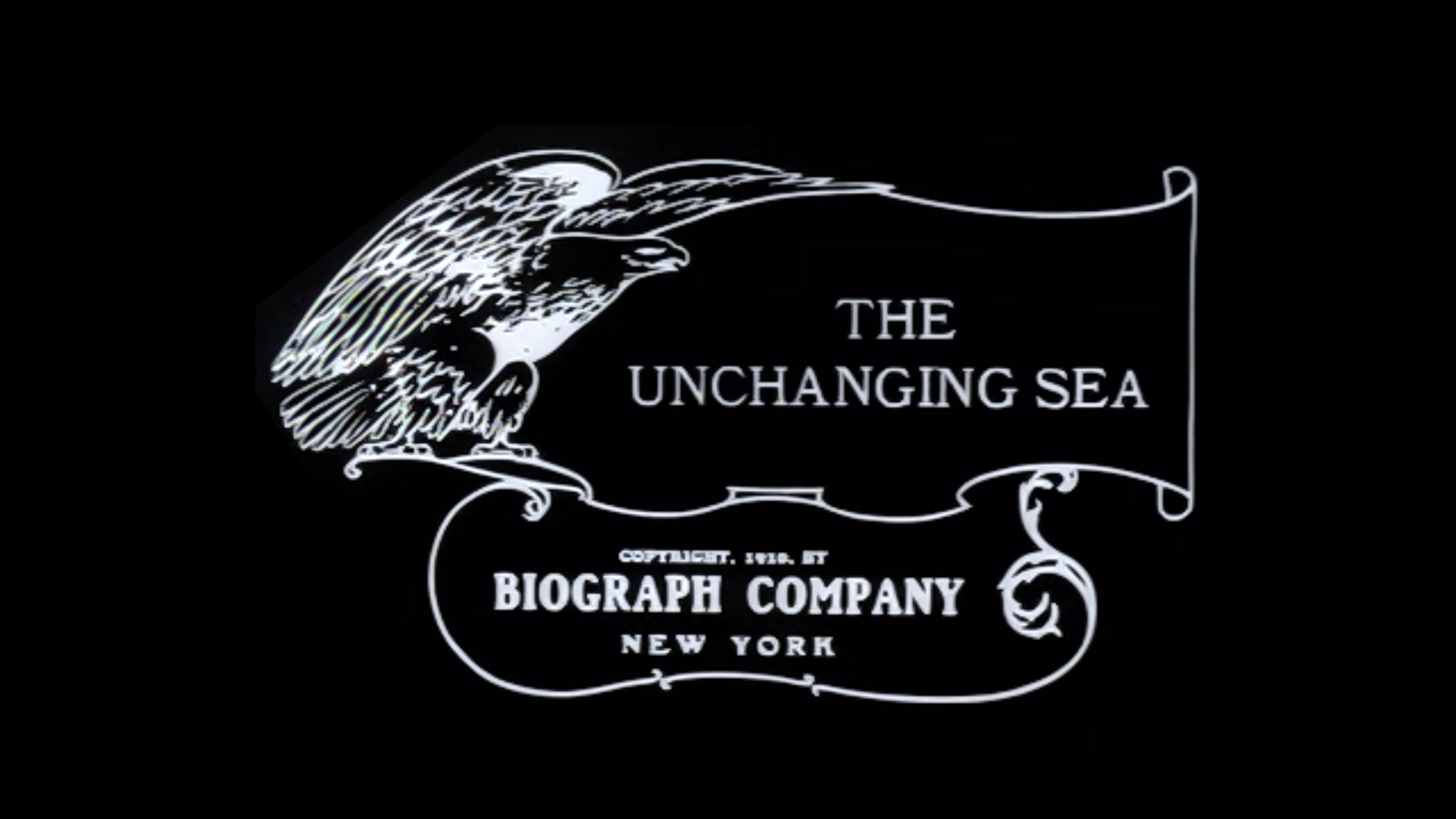
- Title card
- Directed by: D. W. Griffith
- Written by: Charles Kingsley (poem)
- Starring: Arthur V. Johnson
- Cinematography: G. W. Bitzer
- Music by: Robert Israel
- Distributed by: Biograph Company
- Release date: May 5, 1910
- Running time: 14 minutes (18 frame/s)
- Country: United States
- Language: Silent (English intertitles)

The Unchanging Sea is a 1910 American silent drama film directed by D. W. Griffith. A print of the film survives in the Library of Congress film archive.

== Plot ==
A young married couple is shown enjoying time together at the seaside, where they draw the attention of workers on the beach. The husband later departs on a fishing trip, while the wife remains ashore to see him off. In the days that follow, she and other women repeatedly return to the beach, hoping for the sailors' return.

Eventually, three bodies are recovered from the sea. One of them is the husband, who is revived by fellow fishermen but suffers from amnesia. The wife, now caring for their infant, continues to return to the beach in anticipation of his recovery and return.

As time passes, the child matures, and she and her mother maintain their visits to the shoreline. The daughter later marries a young fisherman. The mother, now elderly, continues her solitary visits to the beach. During a subsequent trip to sea, the husband experiences a return of memory, and he is ultimately reunited with his wife.

== Cast ==
- Arthur V. Johnson as The Husband
- Linda Arvidson as The Wife
- Gladys Egan as The Daughter as a Young Girl
- Mary Pickford as The Daughter as a Young Woman
- Charles West as The Daughter's Sweetheart
- Dell Henderson as Rescuer
- Kate Bruce as Villager
- George Nichols
- Frank Opperman
- Alfred Paget as Villager
- Dorothy West as Villager

== See also ==
- List of American films of 1910
- 1910 in film
