= The Old Bookkeeper =

1912 film directed by D. W. Griffith

- Directed by: D. W. Griffith
- Written by: Belle Taylor
- Starring: Blanche Sweet; Edwin August
- Cinematography: G. W. Bitzer
- Distributed by: Biograph Company
- Release date: January 18, 1912
- Running time: 17 minutes
- Country: United States
- Language: Silent (English intertitles)

The Old Bookkeeper is a 1912 American short silent drama film directed by D. W. Griffith and starring Blanche Sweet. It is about a beloved man who is fired by a new manager who wants to give the bookkeeping job to his friend.

== Cast ==
- W. Chrystie Miller as The Old Bookkeeper
- Edwin August as The Old Bookkeeper's Employer
- Blanche Sweet as The Old Bookkeeper's Employer's Wife
- Edward Dillon as An Office Visitor
- Charles Gorman as In Office
- Harry Hyde as In Office
- J. Jiquel Lanoe as In Office
- Adolph Lestina as In Office
- Joseph McDermott as The Police Sergeant
- Alfred Paget as A Thief
- Vivian Prescott as In Office
- W. C. Robinson as A Policeman
- Jackie Saunders as The Maid
- Kate Toncray as The Landlady (unconfirmed)
- Charles West as In Office

== See also ==
- D. W. Griffith filmography
- Blanche Sweet filmography
