= Gold and Glitter =

1912 film

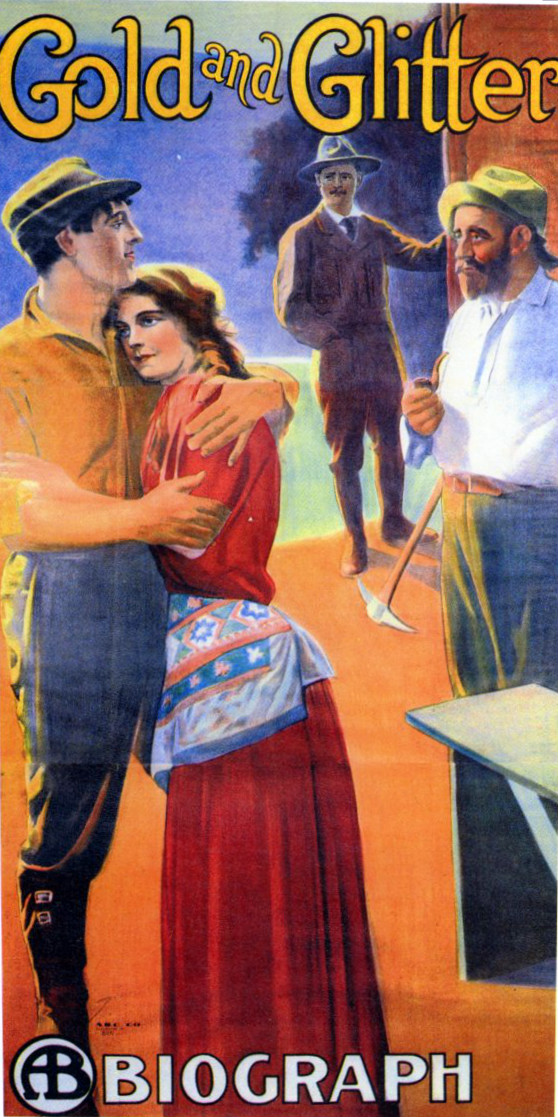
- Original theatrical poster
- Directed by: D. W. Griffith; Frank Powell
- Written by: George Hennessy
- Starring: Elmer Booth
- Cinematography: G. W. Bitzer
- Distributed by: General Film Company
- Release date: November 12, 1912
- Running time: 17 minutes (16 frame/s)
- Country: United States
- Language: Silent (English intertitles)

Gold and Glitter is a 1912 American silent drama film co-directed by D. W. Griffith and Frank Powell. Lillian Gish, in the leading female role, was called upon for a variety of emotions, in comparison to her previous roles. A print of the film is reportedly held at the National Audio-Visual Conservation Center of the Library of Congress.

== Cast ==
- Elmer Booth as The Husband
- Grace Lewis as The Wife
- Lionel Barrymore as The Lover
- Lillian Gish as The Young Woman
- William J. Butler as The First Older Brother
- Walter P. Lewis as The Second Older Brother (credited as Walter Lewis)
- Gertrude Bambrick
- Harry Carey as Lumberman
- John T. Dillon as Lumberman
- Dorothy Gish as On Street
- Joseph Graybill as Lumberman
- Alfred Paget as In Canoe
- W. C. Robinson as Lumberman

== See also ==
- Harry Carey filmography
- D. W. Griffith filmography
- Lillian Gish filmography
- Lionel Barrymore filmography
