= The Spirit Awakened =

1912 film

- Directed by: D. W. Griffith
- Starring: Blanche Sweet; W. Chrystie Miller
- Cinematography: G. W. Bitzer
- Distributed by: Biograph Company
- Release date: June 20, 1912
- Running time: 17 minutes
- Country: United States
- Language: Silent (English intertitles)

The Spirit Awakened is a 1912 American short silent drama film directed by D. W. Griffith and starring Blanche Sweet.

== Cast ==
- Blanche Sweet as The Young Woman
- W. Chrystie Miller as The Young Woman's Father
- Kate Bruce as The Young Woman's Mother
- Edward Dillon as The Christian Farmhand
- Alfred Paget as The Renegade Farmhand
- Mae Marsh as The Renegade Farmhand's Sweetheart
- J. Jiquel Lanoe (as Jacque Lenor)
- Charles West

== See also ==
- List of American films of 1912
- D. W. Griffith filmography
- Blanche Sweet filmography
