= A Splendid Hazard =

1920 film by Allan Dwan

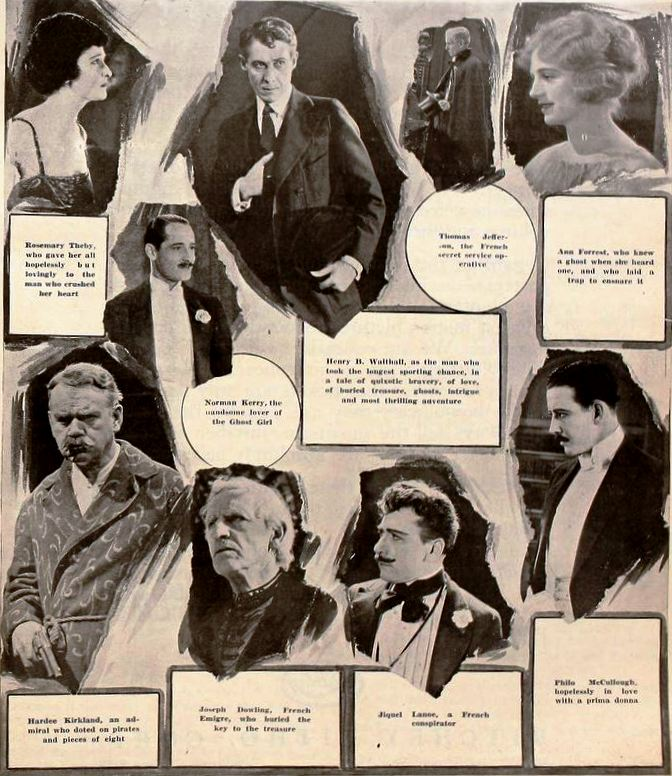
- Cast of A Splendid Hazard
- Directed by: Allan Dwan
- Based on: A Splendid Hazard by Harold McGrath
- Produced by: Mayflower Photoplay Company
- Starring: Henry B. Walthall
- Cinematography: Glen MacWilliams
- Production company: Mayflower Photoplay Company
- Distributed by: First National Exhibitors' Circuit
- Release date: September 26, 1920
- Running time: 60 minutes
- Country: United States
- Language: Silent (English intertitles)

A Splendid Hazard is a lost 1920 American silent drama film directed by Allan Dwan and starring Henry B. Walthall. The film is based on the 1910 book of the same name. The film was produced by the Mayflower Photoplay Company.

== Plot ==
The main character, Karl Breitman thinks he is a descendant of Napoleon and tries bring back to France the French monarchy. As part of his plot he courts Hedda Gobert as she owns some Napoleon's papers. After winning Hedda heart he takes the documents from her. He travels to America to visit Admiral Killigrew. He hopes the stolen papers will lead him to Napoleon wealth. He finds a treasure map in the Admiral's home and then travels to Corsica. Before finding the Napoleon wealth, he comes across someone that mocks him. He challenges them to a duel. In the duel he is mortally wounded. He dies at his love side, Hedda.

== Cast ==
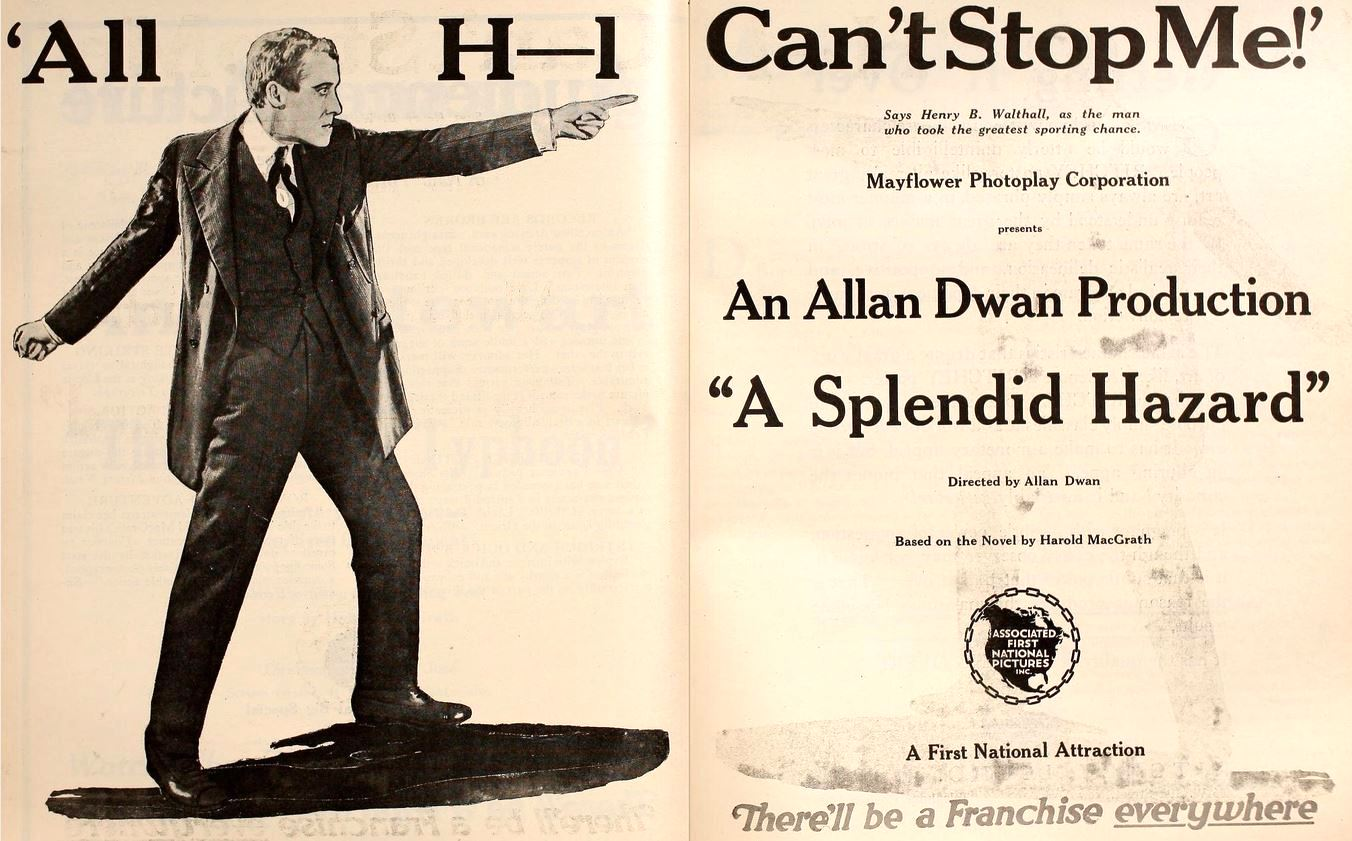
Ad for A Splendid Hazard with Henry B. Walthall

- Henry B. Walthall as Karl Breitman
- Rosemary Theby as Hedda Gobert
- Norman Kerry as John Fitzgerald
- Ann Forrest as Laura Killigrew
- Hardee Kirkland as Adm. Killegrew
- Thomas Jefferson as Dr. Ferraud
- Philo McCullough as Arthur Cathewe
- J. Jiquel Lanoe as Jiquel Lanoe
- Joseph J. Dowling as Joseph Dowling

== Preservation ==
With no holdings located in archives, A Splendid Hazard is considered a lost film.
