= Katchem Kate =

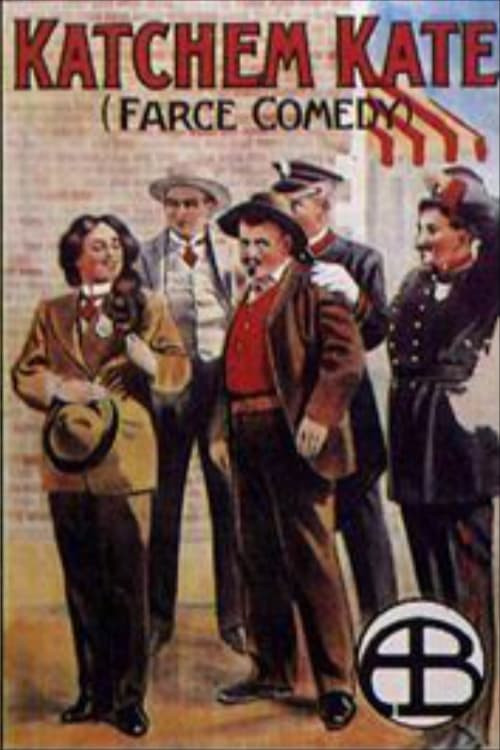
- Directed by: Mack Sennett
- Based on: "Cunning Kate" by Dell Anderson
- Starring: Mabel Normand
- Release date: 1912
- Country: United States

Katchem Kate is a 1912 extant comedic silent film directed by Mack Sennett and starring Mabel Normand. The film was based on Dell Anderson's story "Cunning Kate."

The film was filmed in Los Angeles.

== Cast ==
- Mabel Normand as Katchem Kate
- Fred Mace as Detective Agency Head
- Sylvia Ashton as Kate's supervisor
- Frank Opperman as customer / anarchist
- Charles Avery
- Edward Dillon
- Jack Pickford
