= A Voice from the Deep =

1912 film

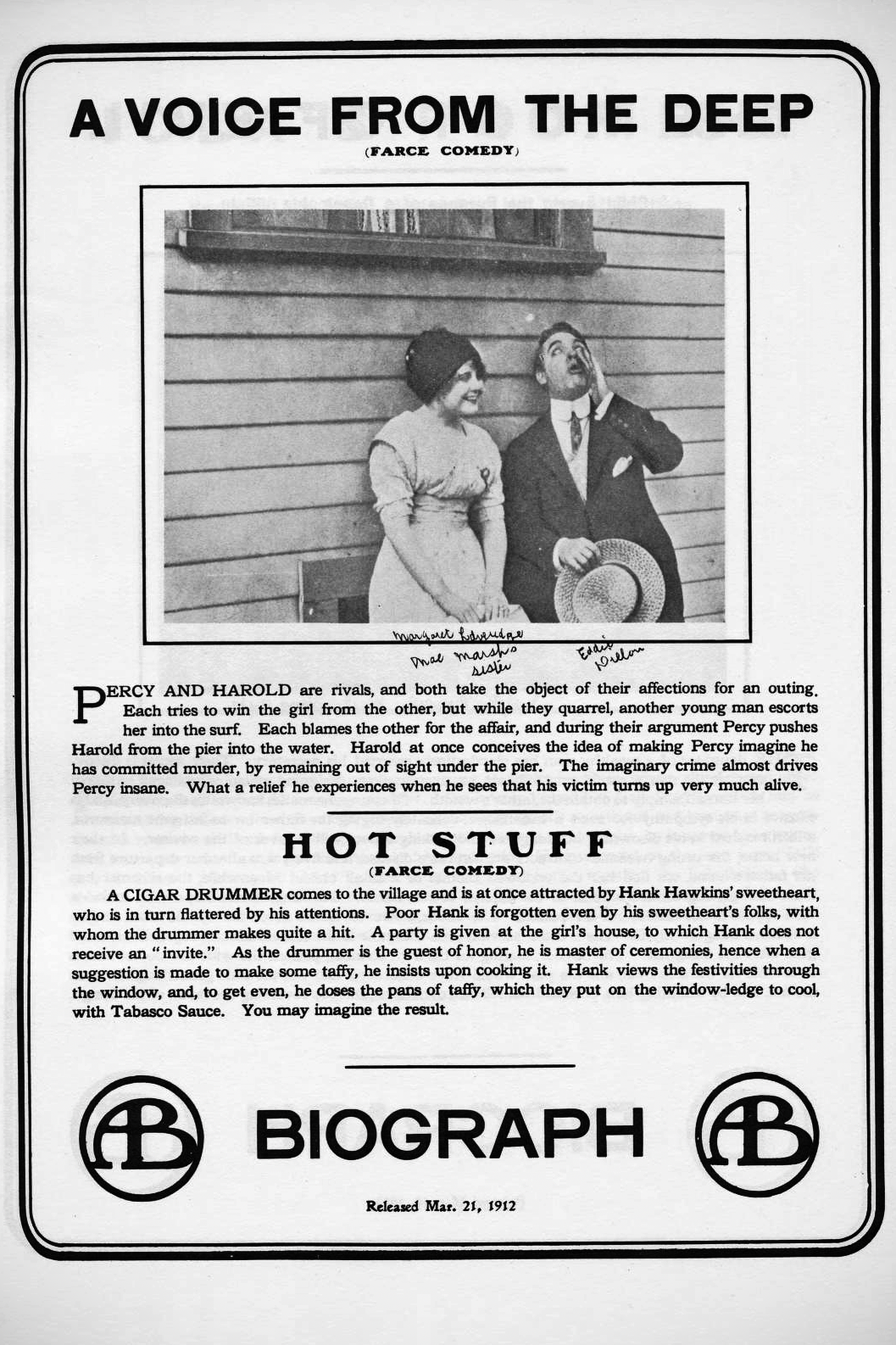
- Directed by: Mack Sennett
- Written by: Dell Henderson
- Starring: Roscoe 'Fatty' Arbuckle; Mabel Normand
- Release date: March 21, 1912
- Running time: split-reel with Hot Stuff
- Country: United States
- Language: Silent (English intertitles)

A Voice from the Deep is a 1912 American short comedy film featuring Roscoe Arbuckle and Mabel Normand.

== Cast ==
- Mabel Normand
- Roscoe Arbuckle
- Edward Dillon as Percy
- Fred Mace as Harold
- Marguerite Marsh as The Girl (as Marguerite Loveridge)
- William J. Butler as A Fisherman
- Dell Henderson as On Roller Coaster
- Florence Barker
- Harry Hyde as On Roller Coaster / On Beach
- J. Jiquel Lanoe as On Beach
- Florence Lee as On Roller Coaster
- Mae Marsh as On Beach

== See also ==
- Fatty Arbuckle filmography
