= Fatty's Magic Pants =

1914 film

- Film poster
- Directed by: Fatty Arbuckle
- Produced by: Mack Sennett
- Starring: Fatty Arbuckle
- Release date: December 14, 1914
- Running time: 12 minutes
- Country: United States
- Language: Silent with English intertitles

Fatty's Magic Pants is a 1914 American short comedy film directed by and starring Fatty Arbuckle. The film is also known as Fatty's Suitless Day.

== Cast ==
- Roscoe "Fatty" Arbuckle - Fatty
- Charley Chase - Fatty's Rival
- Minta Durfee - The Girl
- Harry McCoy - Party Guest
- Bert Roach - Party Guest
- Al St. John - Party Guest
- Slim Summerville - Cop
- Frank Opperman as Clothing Store Operator
- Glen Cavender

== See also ==
- List of American films of 1914
- Fatty Arbuckle filmography
