= A String of Pearls (film) =

1912 film

- Directed by: D. W. Griffith
- Written by: Bernardine R. Leist
- Starring: Blanche Sweet; Dorothy Bernard
- Cinematography: G. W. Bitzer
- Distributed by: Biograph Company
- Release date: March 7, 1912
- Running time: 17 minutes
- Country: United States
- Language: Silent (English intertitles)

A String of Pearls is a 1912 American short silent drama film directed by D. W. Griffith and starring Blanche Sweet.

== Cast ==
- Dorothy Bernard as The Poor Woman
- Charles West as The Poor Woman's Brother (as Charles H. West)
- Kate Bruce as The Poor Woman's Mother
- Blanche Sweet as The Second Woman
- William J. Butler as The Second Woman's Father
- Adolph Lestina as The Doctor
- Mack Sennett as The Musician
- Charles Hill Mailes as The Rich Doctor
- Dell Henderson as The Millionaire
- Grace Henderson as The Millionaire's Wife

== See also ==
- List of American films of 1912
- D. W. Griffith filmography
- Blanche Sweet filmography
