= The Left-Handed Man =

1913 film

- Directed by: D. W. Griffith
- Written by: Frank E. Woods
- Starring: Lillian Gish
- Distributed by: Biograph Company
- Release date: April 21, 1913 (U.S.)
- Running time: 10 minutes
- Country: United States
- Language: Silent (English intertitles)

The Left-Handed Man is a 1913 American short drama film directed by D. W. Griffith. Prints of the film survive at the film archive of the Museum of Modern Art.

== Cast ==
- Lillian Gish as The Old Soldier's daughter
- Charles West as The Old Soldier's daughter's sweetheart
- Harry Carey as The Thief
- Kathleen Butler as in court
- William J. Butler as in court
- William A. Carroll as extra
- William Elmer as policeman
- Frank Evans as policeman
- Charles Gorman as in bar
- Joseph McDermott as policeman
- Alfred Paget as policeman

== See also ==
- Harry Carey filmography
- D. W. Griffith filmography
- Lillian Gish filmography
