= A Sailor's Heart =

1912 film

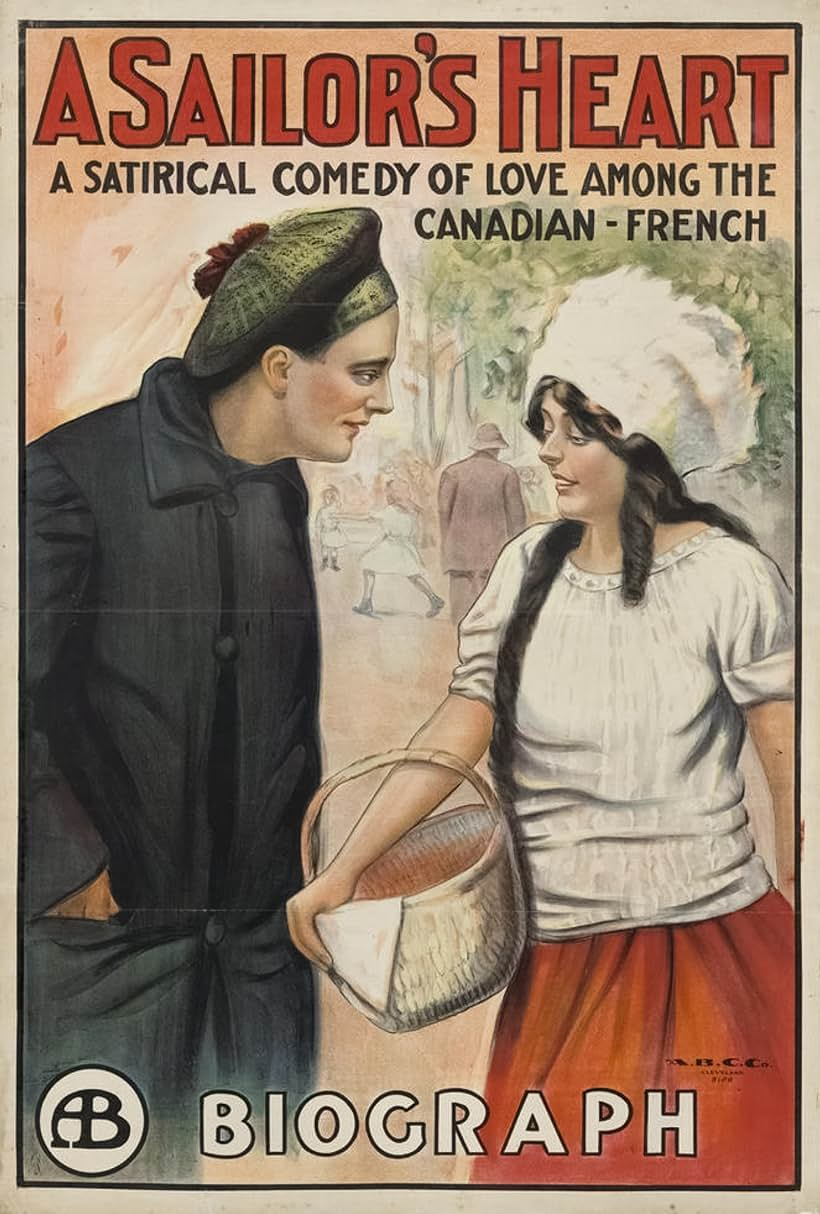
- Directed by: Wilfred Lucas
- Written by: Wilfred Lucas
- Starring: Blanche Sweet; Wilfred Lucas
- Release date: November 25, 1912
- Country: United States
- Language: Silent with English intertitles

A Sailor's Heart is a 1912 American short silent comedy film directed by Wilfred Lucas and starring Blanche Sweet.

== Cast ==
- Wilfred Lucas as The False Husband
- Blanche Sweet as The Wife
- Charles Gorman as The Suitor
- Claire McDowell as The Second Wife
- Robert Harron as On Porch (unconfirmed)
- J. Jiquel Lanoe as On Porch
- Charles Hill Mailes as On Porch
- Bess Meredyth as On Porch
- W. Chrystie Miller as The Minister (unconfirmed)
- Charles West as On Street

== See also ==
- Blanche Sweet filmography
