= The Spanish Gypsy (film) =

1911 film directed by D. W. Griffith

- Directed by: D. W. Griffith
- Starring: Wilfred Lucas
- Cinematography: G. W. Bitzer
- Distributed by: Biograph Company
- Release date: March 30, 1911
- Running time: 17 minutes
- Country: United States
- Language: Silent (English intertitles)

The Spanish Gypsy is a 1911 American short silent drama film directed by D. W. Griffith, starring Wilfred Lucas and featuring Blanche Sweet. It was a Biograph production.

== Cast ==
- Wilfred Lucas as Jose
- Vivian Prescott as Pepita
- Kate Bruce as Pepita's Mother
- William J. Butler as The Doctor
- Jeanie MacPherson as Mariana (as Jeannie MacPherson)
- Claire McDowell as Paula
- Mack Sennett as Gypsy
- Blanche Sweet
- Kate Toncray as Gypsy

== Critical reception ==
A review in Motography described the performance of the gypsy girl as "brilliant throughout". It also praised the "high artistic ability on the part of the producer" in converting a location in California into a convincing representation of Andalusia.
