= Fisher Folks =

1911 silent drama film

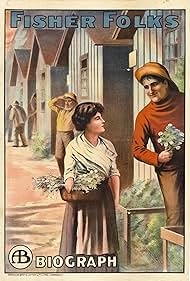
- Directed by: D. W. Griffith
- Produced by: Biograph Company
- Starring: Wilfred Lucas; Linda Arvidson
- Cinematography: G. W. Bitzer
- Distributed by: Biograph Company
- Release date: February 16, 1911
- Running time: 1 reel
- Country: United States
- Language: Silent (English intertitles)

Fisher Folks is a 1911 American silent short drama film directed by D. W. Griffith. It was produced and released by the Biograph Company. It is one of several films written for Griffith by journalist Harriet Quimby, soon before she gained fame as a pioneering aviator.

== Cast ==
- Wilfred Lucas as Steve Hardester
- Linda Arvidson as Bertha
- Vivian Prescott as Cora
- Verner Clarges as The Minister
- William J. Butler as Fisherman (uncredited)
- Edward Dillon as At Fair (uncredited)
- John T. Dillon as At Fair (uncredited)
- Joseph Graybill as At Fair (uncredited)
- Jeanie MacPherson as At Wedding (uncredited)
- Claire McDowell as At Fair (uncredited)
- W. Chrystie Miller as At Wedding (uncredited)
- Alfred Paget as At Wedding / At Fair (uncredited)
- W. C. Robinson as At Wedding / At Fair (uncredited)
- Mack Sennett as At Fair (uncredited)
- Kate Toncray as On Beach (uncredited)

Fisher Folks (1911), Incomplete
