= An Indian's Loyalty =

1913 film

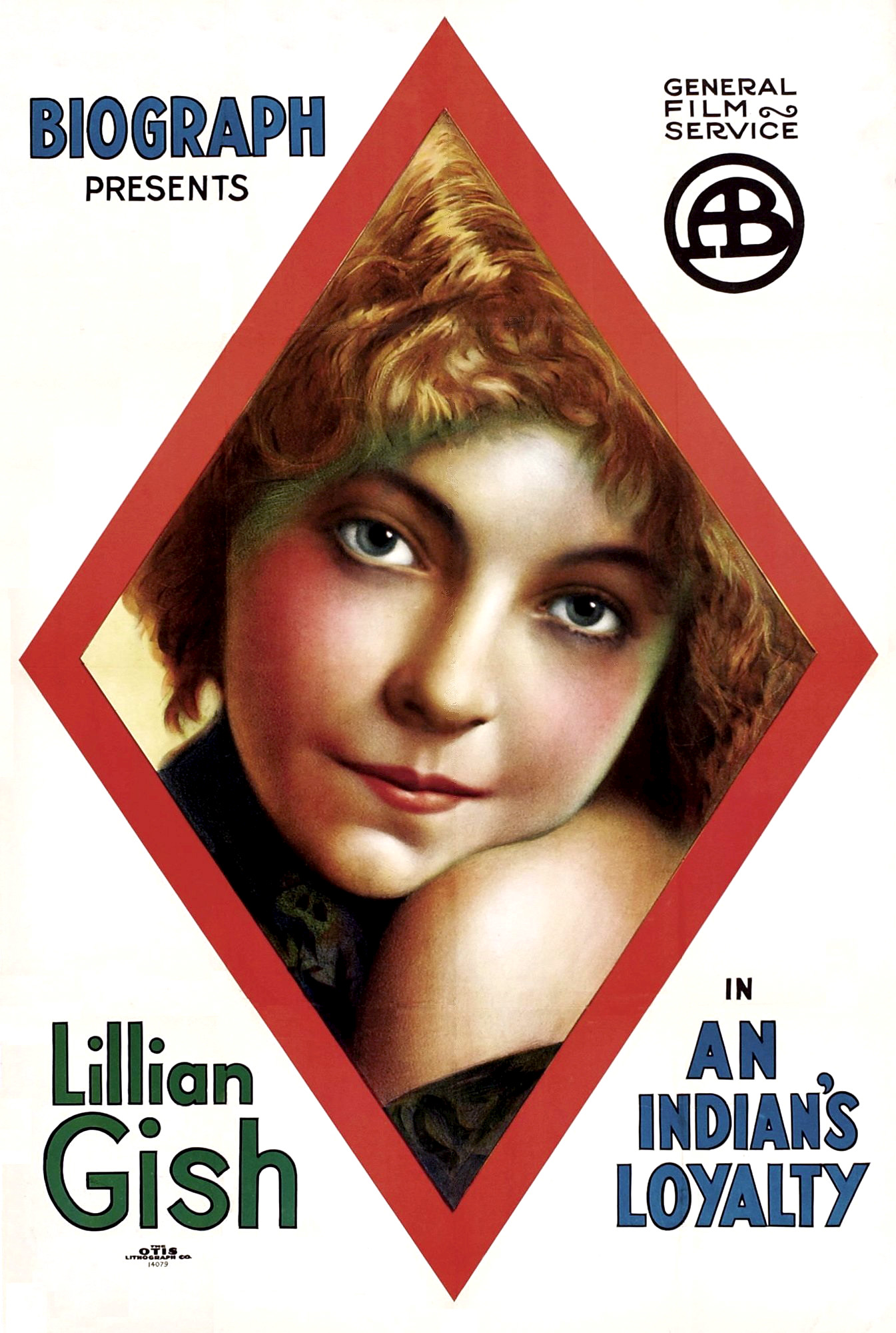
- Theatrical poster
- Directed by: Christy Cabanne
- Written by: Fred Burns
- Starring: Frank Opperman; Lillian Gish
- Cinematography: G. W. Bitzer
- Distributed by: General Film Company
- Release date: August 16, 1913
- Running time: 17 minutes
- Country: United States
- Languages: Silent; English intertitles

An Indian's Loyalty is a 1913 American short silent Western film directed by Christy Cabanne and featuring Lillian Gish.

== Cast ==
- Frank Opperman as The Ranchero
- Lillian Gish as The Ranchero's Daughter
- Edward Dillon as The Young Foreman
- Eagle Eye as The Indian
- Fred Burns as The Ranch Hand
- Lionel Barrymore as The Cattle Buyer
- William A. Carroll as The Accomplice
- Dark Cloud (actor) as An Indian
