= Madonna of the Storm =

1913 film

- Directed by: D. W. Griffith
- Written by: Maie B. Havey
- Starring: Lillian Gish
- Cinematography: G. W. Bitzer
- Release date: October 25, 1913 (U.S.)
- Running time: 10 minutes
- Country: United States
- Language: Silent (English intertitles)

Madonna of the Storm is a 1913 American drama film directed by D. W. Griffith and starring Lillian Gish. The plot centers around Gish's character, the innocent wife of an abusive husband, and the reformation of a demimonde.

== Cast ==
- Lillian Gish as the mother
- Charles Hill Mailes as the father
- J. Jiquel Lanoe as the clubman
- W. C. Robinson as the waiter
- Violet Reed as the demi-monde
- Harry Carey
