= Those Country Kids =

1914 film

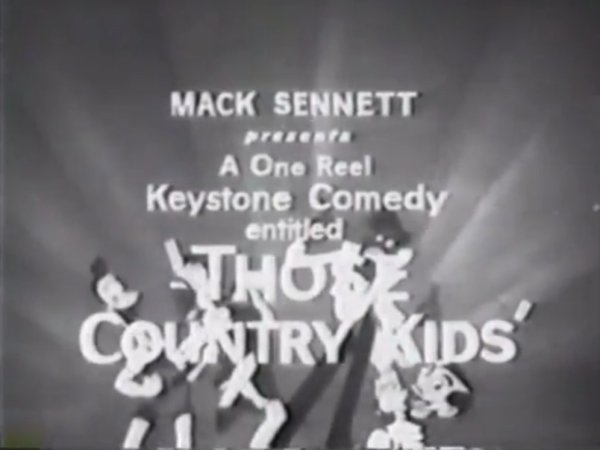
- Directed by: Fatty Arbuckle
- Produced by: Mack Sennett
- Starring: Fatty Arbuckle; Mabel Normand
- Production company: Keystone Studios
- Distributed by: Mutual Film
- Release date: August 20, 1914
- Running time: 1 reel
- Country: United States
- Language: Silent (English intertitles)

Those Country Kids is a 1914 American silent short comedy film starring Fatty Arbuckle and Mabel Normand, and directed by Fatty Arbuckle.

== Plot ==
Mabel's father doesn't want Fatty to court his daughter. Fatty fights off a rival for her hand.

== Cast ==
- Roscoe "Fatty" Arbuckle: Fatty
- Mabel Normand: Mabel
- Al St. John: Mr. Reddy
- Frank Opperman: Mabel's Father
- Alice Davenport: Mabel's Mother
- Josef Swickard: Grey-Bearded Grandfather
- Frank Hayes: Minister
- Billy Gilbert: Man Whose Carriage Is Stolen

== Preservation ==
A 35 mm print is held by George Eastman House.

== See also ==
- List of American films of 1914
- Fatty Arbuckle filmography
