= Friends (1912 film) =

1912 film

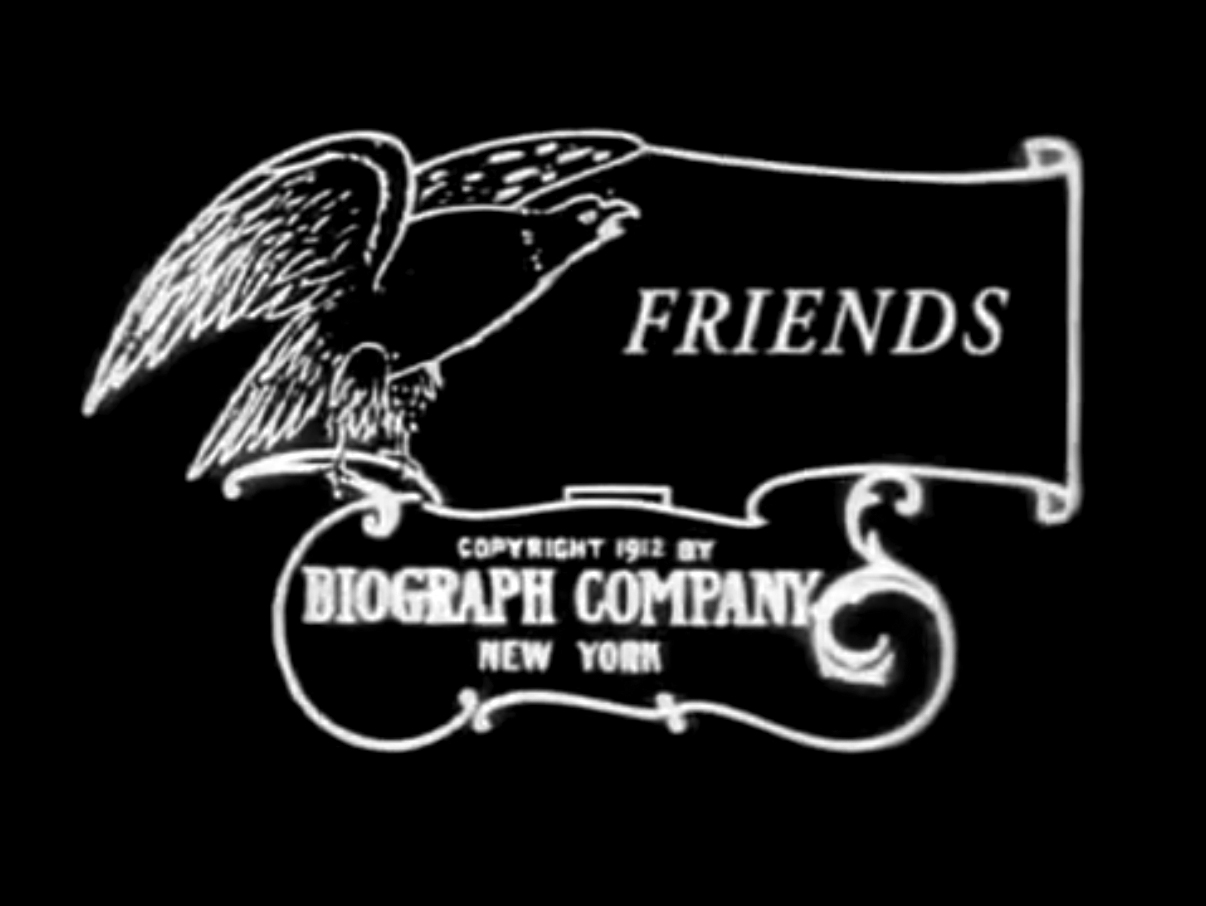
- Title card
- Directed by: D. W. Griffith
- Written by: D. W. Griffith
- Starring: Mary Pickford; Henry B. Walthall; Lionel Barrymore; Harry Carey
- Cinematography: G. W. Bitzer
- Distributed by: Biograph
- Release date: September 23, 1912
- Running time: 13 minutes
- Country: United States
- Language: Silent (English intertitles)

Friends is a 1912 silent short film written and directed by D. W. Griffith and starring Mary Pickford, Henry B. Walthall, Lionel Barrymore, and Harry Carey. Walthall and Barrymore portray two old friends who each wind up involved with a beautiful girl (Pickford) who lives above a mining camp saloon.

The film, by the Biograph Company, was shot in Fort Lee, New Jersey when many early film studios in America's first motion picture industry were based there at the beginning of the 20th century. A print of Friends was run at the Museum of Modern Art in New York City in July 2007 as part of a Biograph retrospective.

It contains what Mary Pickford said in a CBC Radio interview to be the first closeup shot in all of cinema (one taken of herself).

Complete film

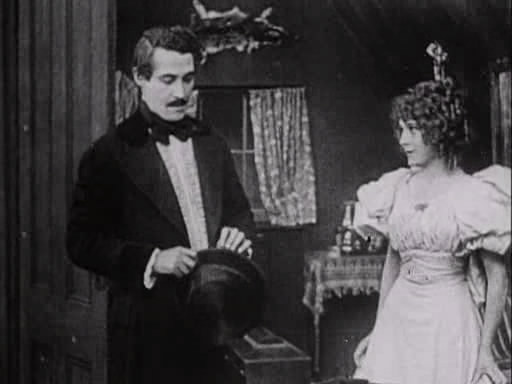
Henry B. Walthall and Mary Pickford

== Plot ==
Dandy Jack, the sweetheart of Dora, the "little orphan of Golden Creek Inn," is leaving to try his luck mining elsewhere. She bursts into tears when he refuses to take her with him.

Jack encounters his old friend and fellow miner, Grizzley Fallon, on his way. Later Grizzley arrives at the Golden Creek hotel saloon. He makes the acquaintance of Dora, who is initially cool to him. After some thought, she agrees to his marriage proposal. He leaves the mining camp for a few days, but gives her his portrait. When he learns that Jack has returned, he turns back. Jack, unaware of the identity of his rival, bets the bar patrons he can get Dora back. Dora tries to send him away, but in the end embraces him. Then Jack sees Grizzley's picture. He gives Dora up and pays his gambling debt. When Grizzley and Jack are reunited, they celebrate the former's impending marriage.

== Cast ==
- Mary Pickford as Dora (the orphan)
- Henry B. Walthall as Dandy Jack
- Lionel Barrymore as Grizzley Fallon (Dandy Jack's friend)
- Harry Carey as Bob Kyne (the prospector)
- Charles Hill Mailes as The bartender
- Elmer Booth as Man in saloon
- Frank Evans as Man in saloon
- Robert Harron as Stableboy
- Adolph Lestina as Man in saloon
- Walter Miller as Man in saloon
- W. C. Robinson as Man in saloon

== Preservation ==
Preserved by paper print held by Library of Congress.

== See also ==
- Harry Carey filmography
- D. W. Griffith filmography
- Lionel Barrymore filmography
- Mary Pickford filmography
