= The Mistake (film) =

1913 film

- Directed by: D. W. Griffith
- Written by: Anita Loos
- Starring: Blanche Sweet
- Cinematography: G. W. Bitzer
- Distributed by: Biograph Company
- Release date: July 12, 1913 (U.S.)
- Running time: 17 minutes
- Country: United States
- Language: Silent (English intertitles)

The Mistake is a 1913 American silent drama film directed by D. W. Griffith.

== Cast ==
- Blanche Sweet as the young woman
- Henry B. Walthall as Jack / the friend / a prospector
- Charles Hill Mailes as the husband / a prospector
- Harry Carey
- Charles Gorman as Indian
- Harry Hyde as Indian
- J. Jiquel Lanoe as Indian
- Hector Sarno as Indian
