= Man's Lust for Gold =

1912 film

- Directed by: D. W. Griffith
- Written by: George Hennessy
- Starring: Blanche Sweet; Robert Harron
- Cinematography: G. W. Bitzer
- Distributed by: Biograph Company
- Release date: July 1, 1912
- Running time: 17 minutes
- Country: United States
- Language: Silent (English intertitles)

Man's Lust for Gold is a 1912 American short silent drama film directed by D. W. Griffith and starring Blanche Sweet.

== Cast ==
- Blanche Sweet as The Prospector's Daughter
- Robert Harron as The Prospector's Son
- Frank Opperman as The Claim Jumper
- Charles Hill Mailes as The Mexican
- William J. Butler as The Prospector
- William A. Carroll as Among the Indians
- Jack Pickford as Among the Indians

== See also ==
- List of American films of 1912
- D. W. Griffith filmography
- Blanche Sweet filmography
