= A Frightful Blunder =

1913 film directed by Anthony O'Sullivan

- Directed by: Anthony O'Sullivan
- Written by: Edward Acker
- Starring: Charles West
- Release date: April 17, 1913
- Country: United States
- Language: Silent with English intertitles

A Frightful Blunder is a 1913 American silent drama film featuring Harry Carey.

== Cast ==
- Charles West as The Young Businessman
- Viola Barry as The Young Woman
- Walter Miller as The Pharmacist
- Kate Bruce as The Young Woman's Mother
- William A. Carroll as A Customer
- Harry Carey as The Superintendent

== See also ==
- Harry Carey filmography
