= During the Round-Up =

1913 film

- Directed by: Christy Cabanne
- Written by: Christy Cabanne
- Starring: Frank Opperman; Lillian Gish
- Cinematography: G. W. Bitzer
- Release date: July 19, 1913
- Running time: 17 minutes
- Country: United States
- Languages: Silent; English intertitles

During the Round-Up is a 1913 American short silent Western film directed by Christy Cabanne and featuring Lillian Gish.

== Cast ==
- Frank Opperman as The Ranchero
- Lillian Gish as The Ranchero's Daughter
- Henry B. Walthall as The Stranger
- William A. Carroll as The Mexican
- Fred Burns (actor) as The Foreman
- Bob Burns as The Foreman's Brother (as Robert Burns)

== See also ==
- List of American films of 1913
- Lillian Gish filmography
