= J. Jiquel Lanoe =

French actor (1875–1948)

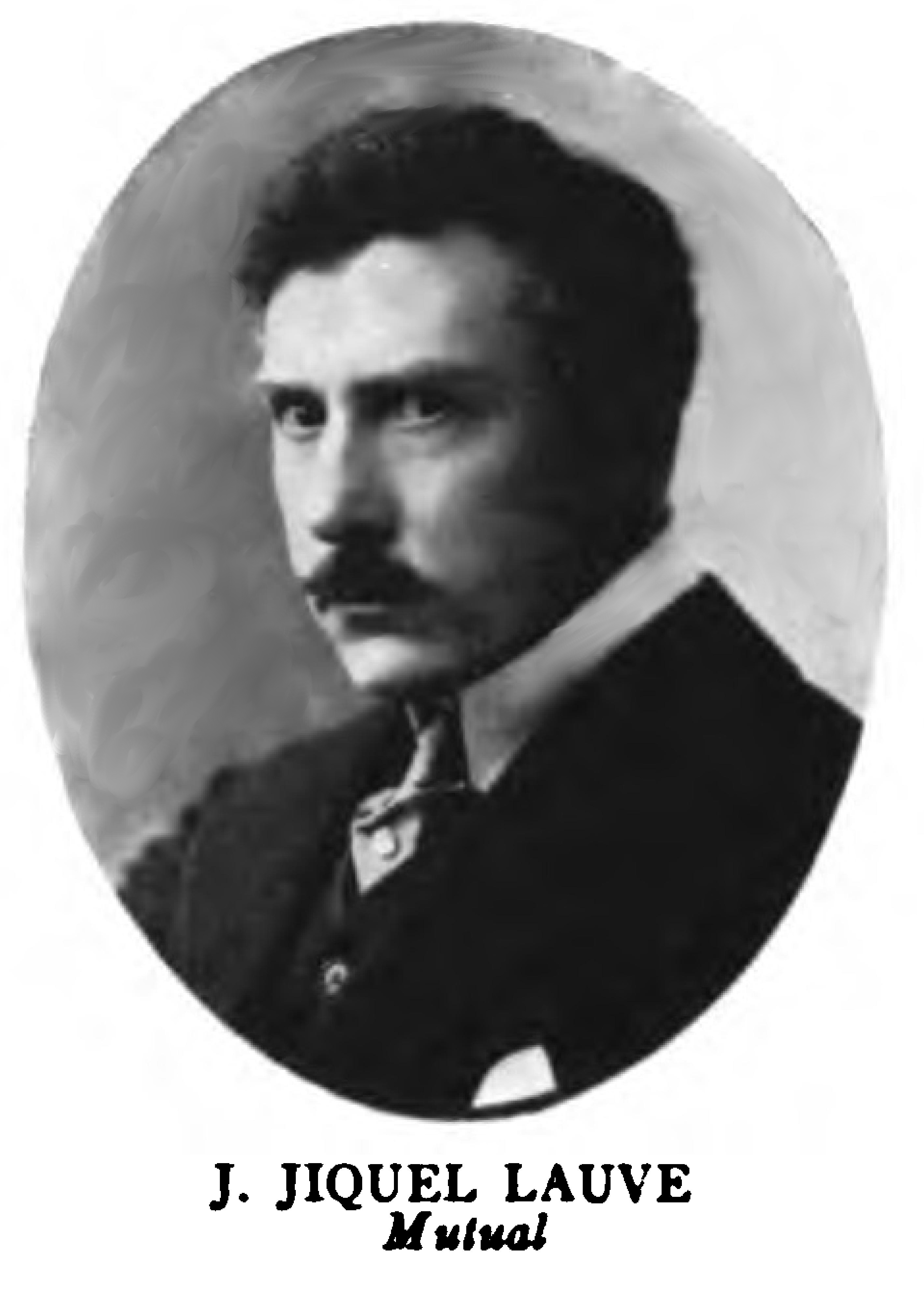
- Lanoe in 1914
- Born: Joseph Jiquel Lanoe; 3 October 1875; Vannes, Morbihan, France
- Died: 15 February 1948 (aged 72); Papeete, Tahiti
- Occupation: Actor
- Years active: 1910–1923

Joseph Jiquel Lanoe (3 October 1875 – 15 February 1948) was a French actor who appeared in films and theater in the United States. He had roles in more than 100 American Biograph films. A gay man, D. W. Griffith cast him as a gay eunuch character in Judith of Bethulia. He was the lover of fellow actor Harry Hyde and a close friend of artist Granville Redmond, with whom he often painted.

== Filmography ==
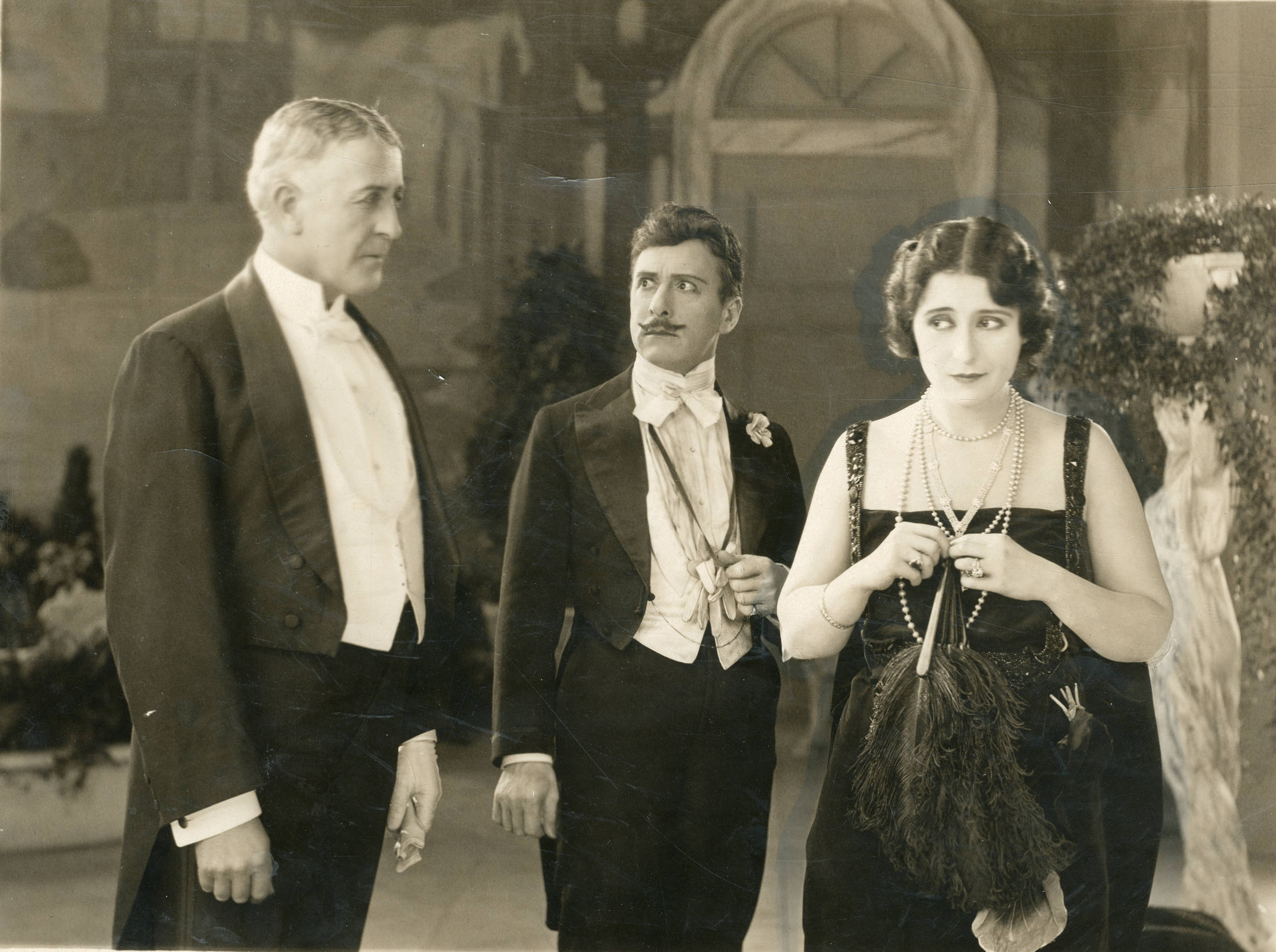
Scene from The Forbidden Woman (1920)

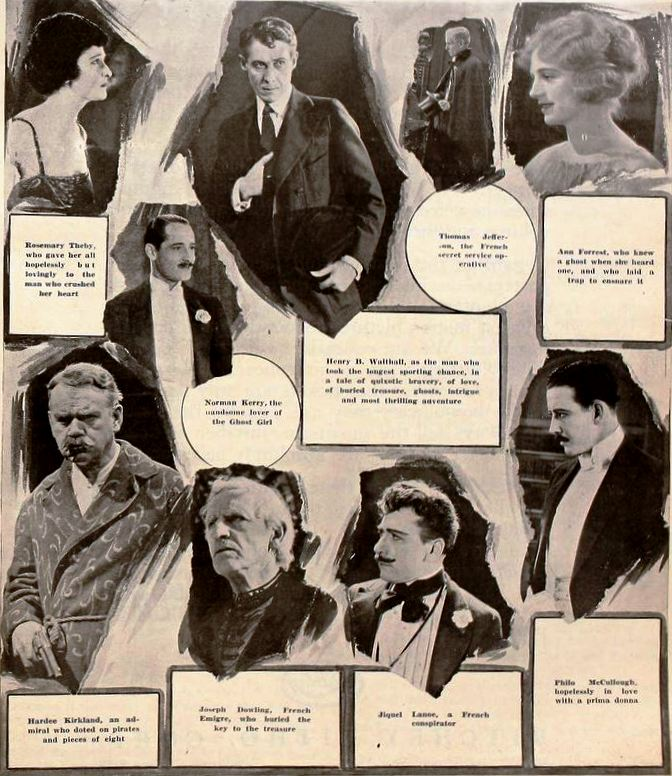
Advertisement for A Splendid Hazard (1920)

- My Hero (1912) as Settler
- Three Friends (1913) as In First Factory
- Brute Force (1914) as In Club (Prologue) / Tribesman (The Old Days)
- Judith of Bethulia (1914) as Eunuch
- The Lady and the Mouse (1913) as At Garden Party
- The Mothering Heart (1913) as Outside Club / Club Patron
- A Splendid Hazard (1920)
- Pirate Gold (1913) as The Successful Suitor
- Oil and Water (1913) as In Second Audience
- Love in an Apartment Hotel (1913) as In Hotel Lobby
- The Old Bookkeeper (1912) as In Office
- Red Hicks Defies the World (1913) as In Crowd Charles Hill Mailes - In Crowd
- The Transformation of Mike (1912) as In Bar / At Dance
- Prodigal Daughters (1923) as Juda Botanya
- The God Within (1912) as In Other Town
- The Inner Circle (1912) as The Rich Italian
- The Yaqui Cur (1913) as In Tribe
- The Eternal City (1915) as Charles Minghelli
- The Punishment (1912) as The Father
- The Spirit Awakened (1912) as Jacque Lenor
- A Sailor's Heart (1912) as On Porch
- The Mothering Heart (1913) as Outside Club / Club Patron
- The Lesser Evil (1912) as In Smuggler Band
- The Root of Evil (1912) as the Secretary
- A Beast at Bay (1912) as At Station
- Fate's Turning (1911) as Attorney
- The Kiss (1921) as Carlos
- With the Enemy's Help (1912) as The Claim Assessor
- Just Like a Woman (1912) as the Broker
- The Narrow Road (1912) as A Prisoner / The Foreman
- A Voice from the Deep (1912) as On Beach
- Madonna of the Storm (1913) as The Clubman
- An Outcast Among Outcasts (1912) as A Factory Manager
- The Sorrowful Shore (1913) as On Shore
- The Burglar's Dilemma (1912) as Birthday Wellwisher
- The Mistake (1913) as Indian
- Death's Marathon (1913) as Man at Club
- The Hero of Little Italy as At Ball
- A Dash Through the Clouds (1912) as Townsman
- The Eternal Mother (1912) as A Friend
- Her Awakening (1911) as A Doctor / Accident Witness
- For His Son (1912) as At Soda Fountain
- The Battle (1911) as A Union Officer
- The Unwelcome Guest (1913) as The Doctor
- The Massacre (1912) as In Wagon Train
- A Feud in the Kentucky Hills (1912) as Second Clan Member
- Almost a Wild Man (1913) as In Audience
- The Altar Stairs (1922) as Captain Jean Malet
- The Forbidden Woman (1920)
- The Tiger's Coat (1920)
- The Magnificent Brute (1921)
