= The Sands of Dee =

1912 film

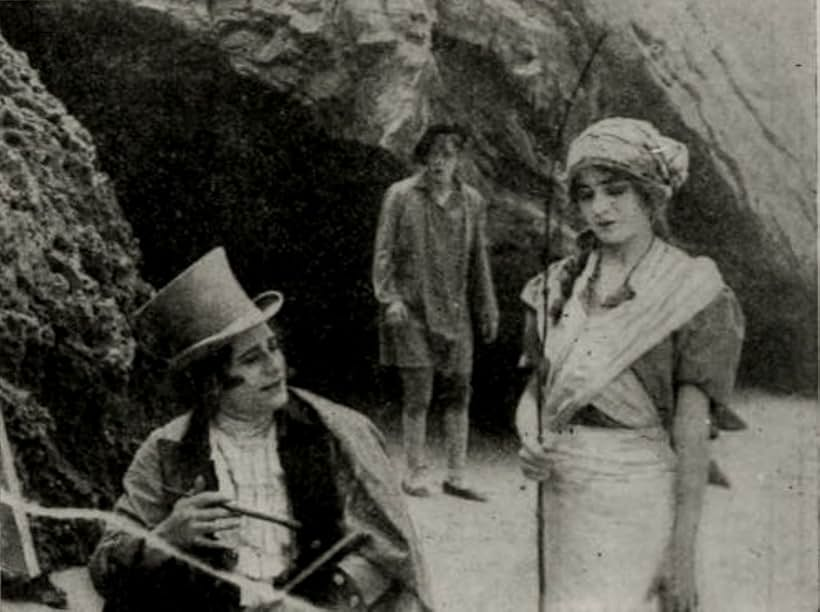
- Film still
- Directed by: D. W. Griffith
- Written by: Charles Kingsley (poem)
- Produced by: Biograph Company
- Starring: Mae Marsh; Robert Harron; Charles Hill Mailes
- Cinematography: G. W. Bitzer
- Distributed by: Biograph Company
- Release date: July 22, 1912
- Running time: 17 minutes
- Country: United States
- Language: Silent (English intertitles)

The Sands of Dee is a 1912 American short silent drama film directed by D. W. Griffith and starring Mae Marsh and Robert Harron. It was produced and distributed by the Biograph Company.

A paper print is held at the Library of Congress.

The film is used in the opening scene of the 1946 psychological horror film The Spiral Staircase in a recreation of early film exhibition.

== Cast ==
- Mae Marsh as Mary
- Robert Harron as Bobby
- Charles Hill Mailes as Mary's father
- Grace Henderson as Mary's mother
- Kate Toncray as Bobby's mother
- Edwin August as The artist
- Claire McDowell as The artist's fiancée
- Spottiswoode Aitken
- Wilfred Lucas
- W. Chrystie Miller as A fisherman
- Frank Opperman as A fisherman
- Vivian Prescott

== See also ==
- List of American films of 1912
- D. W. Griffith filmography
