= The Wanderer (1913 film) =

1913 film

- Directed by: D. W. Griffith
- Written by: D. W. Griffith
- Starring: Henry B. Walthall
- Cinematography: G. W. Bitzer
- Production company: Biograph Company
- Distributed by: General Film Company
- Release date: May 3, 1913 (U.S.)
- Running time: 15-16 minutes (original film length 1,003 feet)
- Country: United States
- Language: Silent (English intertitles)

The Wanderer is a 1913 American silent drama film short film directed by D. W. Griffith and produced by the Biograph Company. Prints of the film exist in private collections.

== Cast ==
Play partial copy of the film; runtime 00:06:23

- Henry B. Walthall as The Wanderer
- Charles Hill Mailes as the father
- Christy Cabanne as the brother
- Kate Bruce as the old woman
- Lionel Barrymore as the male lover
- Claire McDowell as the female lover
- Kate Toncray as the other mother
- Frank Opperman as the other father
- Mae Marsh as the other parents' daughter, as an adult
- John T. Dillon as the crafty merchant
- Walter Miller as the other man
- Charles West as the friar
