= With the Enemy's Help =

1912 film

- Directed by: Wilfred Lucas
- Starring: Blanche Sweet; Mary Pickford
- Cinematography: G. W. Bitzer
- Production company: Biograph Company
- Distributed by: General Film Company
- Release date: August 19, 1912
- Country: United States
- Language: Silent (English intertitles)

With the Enemy's Help is a 1912 American short silent Western film directed by Wilfred Lucas, starring Blanche Sweet and Mary Pickford. A print of With the Enemy's Help exists.

== Cast ==
- Charles West as The Prospector
- Blanche Sweet as The Prospector's Wife
- Mary Pickford as Faro Kate
- Charles Hill Mailes as Faro Kate's Husband
- Edna Foster as The Prospector's Daughter
- Charles Gorman as The Sheriff
- J. Jiquel Lanoe as The Claim Assessor
