= The Goddess of Sagebrush Gulch =

1912 film

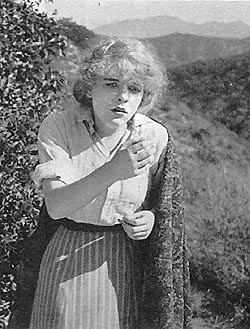
- Blanche Sweet
- Directed by: D. W. Griffith
- Written by: Bret Harte; Stanner E. V. Taylor
- Produced by: D. W. Griffith
- Starring: Blanche Sweet; Charles West
- Cinematography: G. W. Bitzer
- Distributed by: Biograph Company
- Release date: March 25, 1912
- Running time: 17 minutes
- Country: United States
- Language: Silent (English intertitles)

The Goddess of Sagebrush Gulch is a 1912 American short silent Western film directed by D. W. Griffith and starring Blanche Sweet.

== Cast ==
- Blanche Sweet as The Goddess
- Charles West as Blue Grass Pete
- Dorothy Bernard as The Goddess's Sister
- Harry Hyde as The Prospector
- W. Christy Cabanne as A Villain
- William A. Carroll as A Villain
- Frank Evans as A Cowboy
- Charles Gorman as A Cowboy
- Wilfred Lucas
- Charles Hill Mailes as A Villain
- W. Chrystie Miller as Old Man
- Frank Opperman as A Cowboy
- Anthony O'Sullivan
- Alfred Paget as A Cowboy
- W. C. Robinson as A Cowboy

== See also ==
- List of American films of 1912
- D. W. Griffith filmography
- Blanche Sweet filmography
