= The Broken Cross (1911 film) =

1911 film directed by D. W. Griffith

- Directed by: D. W. Griffith
- Written by: Harriet Quimby
- Starring: Charles West
- Cinematography: G. W. Bitzer
- Distributed by: Biograph Company
- Release date: April 6, 1911
- Running time: 17 minutes
- Country: United States
- Language: Silent (English intertitles)

The Broken Cross is a 1911 American short silent romance film directed by D. W. Griffith, starring Charles West and featuring Blanche Sweet.

== Cast ==
- Charles West as Tom
- Florence La Badie as Kate
- Grace Henderson as The Landlady
- Dorothy West as The Manicurist
- Vivian Prescott as Slavey
- Claire McDowell as Kate's Mother
- Blanche Sweet

== See also ==
- List of American films of 1911
