= The Eternal Mother (1912 film) =

1912 film by D. W. Griffith

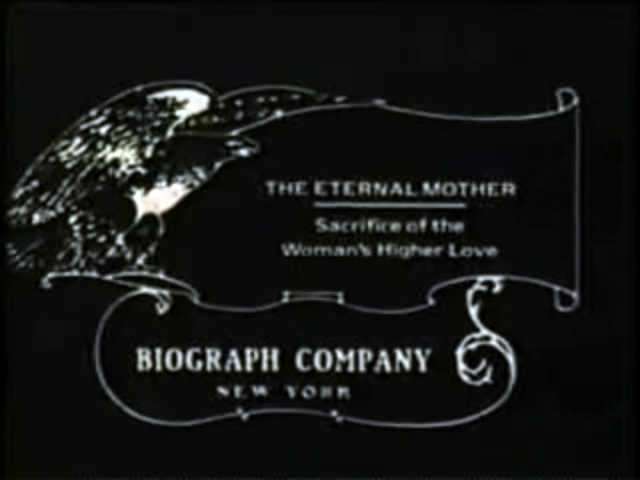
- Title card
- Directed by: D. W. Griffith
- Written by: D. W. Griffith
- Starring: Blanche Sweet; Edwin August
- Cinematography: G. W. Bitzer
- Distributed by: Biograph Company
- Release date: January 11, 1912
- Running time: 17 minutes
- Country: United States
- Language: Silent (English intertitles)

The Eternal Mother is a surviving 1912 American short silent drama film directed by D. W. Griffith and starring Blanche Sweet. The film was shot in Fort Lee, New Jersey when Biograph Company and other early film studios in America's first motion picture industry were based there at the beginning of the 20th century.

== Cast ==
Full film

- Edwin August as John, the Husband
- Blanche Sweet as Martha, the Wife
- Mabel Normand as Mary, the Woman
- Charles Hill Mailes as Mary's Father
- Kate Bruce as An Old Woman
- Donald Crisp as In Field
- Guy Hedlund as A Friend
- J. Jiquel Lanoe as A Friend
- Jeanie MacPherson as In Field

== See also ==
- List of American films of 1912
