= Broken Ways =

1913 film

- Directed by: D. W. Griffith
- Written by: F. P. Bayer
- Starring: Henry B. Walthall; Blanche Sweet
- Cinematography: G. W. Bitzer
- Distributed by: American Mutoscope and Biograph Company
- Release date: March 8, 1913
- Running time: 17 minutes (16 frame/s)
- Country: United States
- Language: Silent (English intertitles)

Broken Ways is a 1913 American short silent Western film directed by D. W. Griffith, starring Henry B. Walthall and Blanche Sweet. A print of the film survives.

== Cast ==
- Henry B. Walthall as the road agent
- Blanche Sweet as the road agent's wife
- Harry Carey as the sheriff
- Charles Gorman as hold up victim
- Frank Opperman as road agent's gang member
- Joseph McDermott as road agent's gang member
- Gertrude Bambrick as in telegraph office / on street
- William A. Carroll as in posse
- Edward Dillon
- Dorothy Gish as in telegraph office
- Robert Harron as in telegraph office
- Adolph Lestina as in telegraph office
- Mae Marsh
- Walter Miller as in town
- Alfred Paget as in posse

== See also ==
- List of American films of 1913
- Harry Carey filmography
- D. W. Griffith filmography
- Blanche Sweet filmography
