= A Modest Hero =

1913 film directed by Dell Henderson

- Directed by: Dell Henderson
- Written by: George Hennessy
- Starring: Walter Miller
- Release date: September 8, 1913
- Running time: 10 minutes
- Country: United States
- Language: Silent with English intertitles

A Modest Hero is a 1913 American drama film featuring Harry Carey.

== Cast ==
- Walter Miller as The Husband
- Lillian Gish as The Wife
- Charles Hill Mailes as First Thief
- John T. Dillon as Second Thief
- Charles West as A Crook / Cleaning Man
- Alfred Paget as First Policeman
- Harry Carey

== See also ==
- Harry Carey filmography
- Lillian Gish filmography
