= Frank Opperman (American actor) =

American actor (1861–1922)

- Born: 1861
- Died: 1922 (aged 60–61)
- Occupation: Actor

Frank Opperman (1861–1922) was an actor in American silent films. In 1916, he was reported to have had a 29-year stage career and a 7-year film career. Between 1903 and 1907, Opperman appeared three times on Broadway, in Little Lord Fauntleroy, Cashel Byron (an adaptation of George Bernard Shaw's Cashel Byron's Profession), and an adaptation of Uncle Tom's Cabin.

In the 1915 short Keystone comedy film A Lucky Leap, Opperman portrays a store owner. Billie Bennett portrays his wife. In the story, their daughter, her love interest, and burglars all take part in a madcap adventure.

== Filmography ==
- Ramona (1910) as Ranch hand
- As It Is In Life (1910) as Companion of Daughter's Husband
- The Unchanging Sea (1910) as In Second Village
- The Indian Brothers (1911) as The Indian Chief
- The New Superintendent (1911)
- An Outcast Among Outcasts (1912) as The Blanket Tramp
- The Sands of Dee (1912) as The Fisherman
- The Punishment (1912) as The Old Gardener
- Just Like a Woman (1912) as Oil Man
- One Is Business, the Other Crime (1912) as The Rich Man's Foreman
- The School Teacher and the Waif (1912) as
- A Lodging for the Night (1912) as Gambling Hall Owner
- Man's Lust for Gold (1912) as The Claim Jumper
- Home Folks (1912) as At Barn Dance
- A Temporary Truce (1912) as A Drunken Cutthroat / The Indian Chief / The Bartender
- The Lesser Evil (1912) as In Smuggler Band
- A Feud in the Kentucky Hills (1912) as Second Clan Member
- The Goddess of Sagebrush Gulch (1912) as A Cowboy
- The Massacre (1912) as Old Settler
- Katchem Kate (1912) as customer / anarchist
- A Timely Interception (1913) as Second Foreman
- The Hero of Little Italy (1913) as In Bar
- A Misunderstood Boy (1913) as In Next Town
- The Wanderer (1913) as The Other Father
- Just Gold (1913) as At Farewell / In Town
- An Indian's Loyalty (1913) as The Ranchero
- The Battle at Elderbush Gulch (1913) as Indian Chief
- Red Hicks Defies the World (1913) as In Crowd
- A Welcome Intruder (1913) as The Hurdy-Gurdy Man
- The Sorrowful Shore (1913) as The Orphan's Father
- The Little Tease (1913) as On Street / In Lunchroom / A Prospector
- An Adventure in the Autumn Woods (1913) as First Thief
- The Lady and the Mouse (1913) as Creditor
- During the Round-Up (1913) as The Ranchero
- The Yaqui Cur (1913) as The Preacher
- Near to Earth (1913) as A Friend
- Broken Ways (1913) as Road Agent's Gang Member
- The House of Darkness (1913) as A Patient / A Clerk
- Judith of Bethulia (1914) as Bethulian
- The Old Actor
- Those Country Kids (1914) as Mabel's father
- Tango Tangles (1914) as Clarinetist / Guest (uncredited)
- The Knockout (1914) as Fight Promoter
- The Masquerader (1914) as Actor
- Gentlemen of Nerve (1914) as Spectator
- Fatty's Magic Pants (1914) as Clothing store operator
- Tillie's Punctured Romance (1914) as Rev. D. Simpson / Guest in first restaurant / Station cop / Movie spectator
- Hash House Mashers as Landlord
- Colored Villainy (1915) as Rastus, the farmer
- A Lucky Leap (1915) as Store owner
- Love In Armor (1915) as Sweetheart's father
- The Rent Jumpers (1915) as Landlord
- Fatty's New Role (1915)
- The Little Teacher (1915) (uncredited)
- My Valet (1915) as Hiram Stebbins
- A Dash of Courage (1916)

== Sources ==
- Walker, Brent E. (January 13, 2010). Mack Sennett's Fun Factory: A History and Filmography of His Studio and His Keystone and Mack Sennett Comedies, with Biographies of Players and Personnel. McFarland. ISBN 978-0-7864-5707-6.
- Niver, Kemp R. (November 15, 2023). Motion Pictures from the Library of Congress Paper Print Collection, 1894-1912. Univ of California Press. ISBN 978-0-520-33410-6.
