= Just Like a Woman (1912 film) =

1912 film

- Directed by: D. W. Griffith
- Written by: George Hennessy
- Produced by: Biograph Company
- Starring: Mary Pickford; Mae Marsh
- Cinematography: G. W. Bitzer
- Distributed by: General Film Company
- Release date: April 18, 1912
- Running time: 17 minutes
- Country: United States
- Language: Silent (English intertitles)

Just Like a Woman is a 1912 American short silent romance film directed by D. W. Griffith and starring Mary Pickford. It was produced by the Biograph Company and distributed by General Film Company.

The film is preserved from a paper print source by the Library of Congress.

== Cast ==
- Mary Pickford as The Young Woman
- Grace Henderson as Young Woman's Mother
- Harry Hyde as The Fortune Hunter
- J. Jiquel Lanoe as The Broker
- Wilfred Lucas as The Wealthy Friend
- Robert Harron as The Stableboy
- Kate Bruce as The Maid
- Kathleen Butler as Servant (uncredited)
- W. Christy Cabanne in club scene (uncredited)
- Hector Dion as An Oil Man (uncredited)
- Charles Hill Mailes as Oil Man (uncredited)
- Mae Marsh in club scene (uncredited)
- Marguerite Marsh in club scene (uncredited)
- Frank Opperman as Oil Man (uncredited)

== See also ==
- List of American films of 1912
- D. W. Griffith filmography
- Mary Pickford filmography
