= The Magic Eye =

- Directed by: Rae Berger
- Written by: Frank Howard Clark; Norris Shannon
- Starring: Henry A. Barrows; Claire Du Brey; Zoe Rae
- Cinematography: John W. Brown
- Production company: Universal Pictures
- Distributed by: Universal Pictures
- Release date: April 1, 1918
- Running time: 50 minutes
- Country: United States
- Languages: Silent; English intertitles

The Magic Eye is a 1918 American silent drama film directed by Rae Berger and starring Henry A. Barrows, Claire Du Brey and Zoe Rae.

== Cast ==
- Henry A. Barrows as John Bowman
- Claire Du Brey as Mrs. Bowman
- Zoe Rae as Shirley Bowman
- Charles Hill Mailes as Sam Bullard
- William A. Carroll as Jack
- Elwood Bredell as Cordy

== Bibliography ==
- John T. Soister, Henry Nicolella & Steve Joyce. American Silent Horror, Science Fiction and Fantasy Feature Films, 1913-1929. McFarland, 2014.
