= Held to Answer =

1923 film

- Directed by: Harold M. Shaw
- Written by: Winifred Dunn
- Starring: House Peters
- Cinematography: George Rizard
- Distributed by: Metro Pictures
- Release date: November 22, 1923
- Running time: 6 reels (approximately 80 minutes)
- Country: United States
- Language: Silent

Held to Answer is a 1923 American silent drama film directed by Harold M. Shaw and starring House Peters. It was based on the novel Held to Answer (1916), by Peter Clark MacFarlane and was adapted for the screen by Winifred Dunn.

== Cast ==
- House Peters as John Hampstead
- Grace Carlyle as Mariann Dounay
- John St. Polis as Hiram Burbeck (as John Sainpolis)
- Evelyn Brent as Bessie Burbeck
- James Morrison as Rollie Burbeck
- Lydia Knott as Mrs. Burbeck
- Bull Montana as 'Red' Lizard
- Gale Henry as The Maid
- Tom Guise as The Judge (as Thomas Guise)
- William Robert Daly as The Organist (as Robert Daly)
- Charles West as 'Spider' Welch
- Charles Hill Mailes as District Attorney Searle (as Charles Mailes)

== Preservation ==
Held to Answer is currently presumed lost. In February 2021, the film was cited by the National Film Preservation Board on their Lost U.S. Silent Feature Films list.
