= When Love Forgives =

1913 film

- Directed by: Anthony O'Sullivan
- Written by: Lula Vollmer
- Starring: Charles West
- Release date: August 2, 1913
- Country: United States
- Language: Silent with English intertitles

When Love Forgives is a 1913 American short drama film featuring Harry Carey.

== Cast ==
- Charles West as The Man
- George Beranger as The Bartender
- Charles Gorman as First Criminal
- Harry Carey as Second Criminal
- Charles Hill Mailes as The Employer

== See also ==
- Harry Carey filmography
