= The Indian Brothers =

1911 film directed by D. W. Griffith

- Directed by: D. W. Griffith
- Starring: Frank Opperman
- Cinematography: G. W. Bitzer
- Release date: July 17, 1911
- Running time: 18 minutes
- Country: United States
- Language: Silent (English intertitles)

The Indian Brothers is a 1911 American short silent drama film directed by D. W. Griffith, starring Frank Opperman and featuring Blanche Sweet.

== Cast ==
- Frank Opperman as The Indian Chief
- Wilfred Lucas as The Indian Chief's Brother
- Guy Hedlund as The Renegade
- John T. Dillon as At Funeral (as Jack Dillon)
- Francis J. Grandon as Indian
- Florence La Badie
- Alfred Paget as In Second Tribe / At Funeral
- W. C. Robinson as In Second Tribe
- Blanche Sweet as Indian
- Kate Toncray as Indian
- Charles West as At Funeral (as Charles H. West)

== See also ==
- D. W. Griffith filmography
- Blanche Sweet filmography
