= William A. Carroll =

American actor

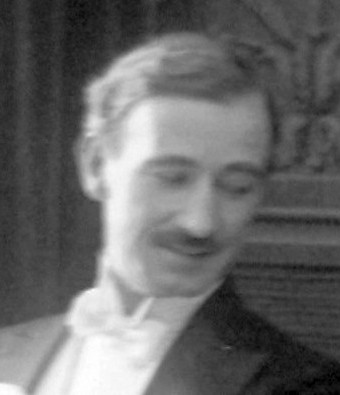
- William Carroll as Wesley Strange in the film Embers (1916)
- Born: January 9, 1875; Manhattan, New York City, United States
- Died: January 26, 1928 (aged 53); Glendale, California, United States
- Occupation: Actor
- Years active: 1911 - 1927

William A. Carroll (January 9, 1875 – January 26, 1928), was an American silent film actor.

== Biography ==
He was born on January 9, 1875, in Manhattan, New York City.

Entering films with the Selig and Vitagraph film company, Carroll starred in 140 films between 1911 and 1927, including such works as 1916's The Twinkler.

He died of a heart attack in 1928.

== Selected filmography ==
- The Immortal Alamo (1911)
- The School Teacher and the Waif (1912)
- The Goddess of Sagebrush Gulch (1912) - a villain
- One Is Business, the Other Crime (1912) - a foreman
- The Lesser Evil (1912) - in a smuggler band
- A Beast at Bay (1912) - a guard
- An Outcast Among Outcasts (1912) - a tramp
- A Temporary Truce (1912) - in bar / among rescuers
- Man's Lust for Gold (1912) - among the Indians (as William Carroll)
- Broken Ways (1913) - in posse
- A Welcome Intruder (1913) - The Wagon Driver
- A Frightful Blunder (1913) - a customer
- A Misunderstood Boy (1913) - a vigilante
- The Left-Handed Man (1913) - an extra
- The Tenderfoot's Money (1913) - The Tenderfoot
- The Stolen Loaf (1913) - at dinner
- The Switch Tower (1913) - first federal agent
- A Gambler's Honor (1913) - in a bar
- During the Round-Up (1913) - the Mexican
- An Indian's Loyalty (1913) - the Accomplice
- The Battle at Elderbush Gulch (1913)
- The Conscience of Hassan Bey (1913)
- Almost a Wild Man (1913)
- Judith of Bethulia (1914)
- Lord Loveland Discovers America (1916)
- Embers (1916) - Wesley Strange
- Dulcie's Adventure (1916)
- The Twinkler (1916)
- My Fighting Gentleman (1916)
- John Ermine of the Yellowstone (1917)
- A Woman's Fool (1918) - Lusk
- The Magic Eye (1918) - Jack
- Hands Up! (1918) - Omar the High Priest
- Bill Henry (1919) - Uncle Chet Jenkins
- The Trail of the Octopus (1919) - Omar
- The Blue Bonnet (1919)
- The Lion Man (1919)
- Married in Haste (1919)
- One-Thing-at-a-Time O'Day (1919)
- The Screaming Shadow (1920) - Harry Malone
- A Motion to Adjourn (1921) - Joe Selinsky
- Fifty Candles (1921) - Henry Drew
- Chain Lightning (1922) - Red Rollins
- Remembrance (1922)
- Confidence (1922)
- Wanderer of the Wasteland (1924) - Merryvale
- Sporting Youth (1924) - Detective
- Women First (1924)
- Alimony (1924)
- K – The Unknown (1924) - Dr. Ed Wilson
- The Unwritten Law (1925) - Mr. Smart
- College Days (1926)
- Snowbound (1927) - Judge Watkins
