= A Change of Spirit =

1912 film

- Directed by: D. W. Griffith
- Written by: D. W. Griffith
- Starring: Blanche Sweet; William J. Butler
- Cinematography: G. W. Bitzer
- Production company: Biograph Company
- Distributed by: Biograph Company
- Release date: August 22, 1912
- Running time: 17 minutes
- Country: United States
- Language: Silent (English intertitles)

A Change of Spirit is a 1912 American short silent drama film directed by D. W. Griffith and starring Blanche Sweet.

== Plot ==
A young woman lives under the strict supervision of her narrow-minded father, who allows her only the company of her chaperone. While walking in the park, she flirts with a young man who is part of a pair of gentleman thieves. He introduces himself by gallantly retrieving a book she has dropped. While returning it, he secretly steals her handbag so he can visit her later under the pretense of returning her "lost" property.

When he calls on her, her father is away. In a moment of rebellion, she invites him inside. During his visit, he secretly takes the house key, planning to return that night with his partner to rob the place. However, when he accidentally encounters the girl a second time, he becomes genuinely smitten. The thought of his promise to burglarize her home that night now disturbs him.

== Cast ==
- Blanche Sweet as The Young Woman
- William J. Butler as The Young Woman's Father
- Kate Toncray as The Young Woman's Mother
- Henry B. Walthall as First Gentleman Thief
- Charles Hill Mailes as Second Gentleman Thief
- Walter Miller as The Robbery Victim
- Robert Harron as Young Man on Street
- Joseph McDermott as Policeman
- W. Chrystie Miller
- W. C. Robinson as Policeman

== See also ==
- List of American films of 1912
- D. W. Griffith filmography
- Blanche Sweet filmography
