= In the Aisles of the Wild =

1912 film

- Directed by: D. W. Griffith
- Written by: Bret Harte; Stanner E. V. Taylor
- Starring: Lillian Gish
- Cinematography: G. W. Bitzer
- Release date: October 14, 1912
- Running time: 17 minutes
- Country: United States
- Language: Silent (English intertitles)

In the Aisles of the Wild is a 1912 American drama film directed by D. W. Griffith.

== Cast ==
- Lillian Gish as The Younger Daughter
- Claire McDowell as The Elder Daughter
- William J. Butler as The Widower
- Henry B. Walthall as Jim Watson
- Harry Carey as Bob Cole
- Elmer Booth as A Woodsman
- Charles Hill Mailes as A Woodsman
- Alfred Paget as An Indian

== See also ==
- Harry Carey filmography
- D. W. Griffith filmography
- Lillian Gish filmography
