= Heredity (film) =

1912 film

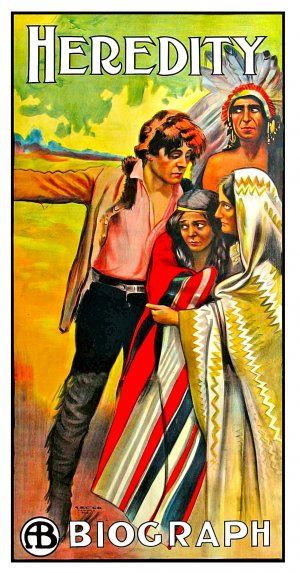
- Theatrical poster to Heredity
- Directed by: D. W. Griffith
- Written by: George Hennessy
- Starring: Harry Carey
- Cinematography: G. W. Bitzer
- Distributed by: General Film Company
- Release date: November 4, 1912
- Running time: 17 minutes (16 frame/s)
- Country: United States
- Language: Silent (English intertitles)

Heredity is a 1912 American drama film directed by D. W. Griffith.

== Cast ==
- Harry Carey as White Renegade Father
- Madge Kirby as Indian Mother
- Jack Pickford as Son of White Renegade Father and Indian Mother
- Walter P. Lewis as Indian Chief
- Kate Bruce as Indian Woman
- Lionel Barrymore as Woodsman
- W. Christy Cabanne as Indian
- Robert Harron as Indian
- George Nichols
- Alfred Paget as Indian / Woodsman
- W. C. Robinson as Indian
- Hector Sarno as Indian (credited as Hector V. Sarno)
- Marion Sunshine
- Kate Toncray
