= The Hero of Little Italy =

1913 film

- Directed by: D. W. Griffith
- Written by: Grace C. de Sellen
- Starring: Blanche Sweet
- Cinematography: G. W. Bitzer
- Distributed by: Biograph Company
- Release date: April 3, 1913
- Running time: 17 minutes
- Country: United States
- Language: Silent (English intertitles)

The Hero of Little Italy is a 1913 American drama film directed by D. W. Griffith and starring Blanche Sweet.

== Cast ==
- Charles West as Joe
- Blanche Sweet as Maria
- Harry Carey as Tony
- Charles Hill Mailes as the father
- Kate Toncray as the mother
- Kathleen Butler as at ball
- William J. Butler as in bar
- John T. Dillon as at ball
- Frank Evans as in bar
- J. Jiquel Lanoe as at ball
- Walter Miller as in bar
- Frank Opperman as in bar

== See also ==
- Harry Carey filmography
- D. W. Griffith filmography
- Blanche Sweet filmography
