= A Feud in the Kentucky Hills =

1912 film

- Directed by: D. W. Griffith
- Written by: D. W. Griffith
- Starring: Mary Pickford
- Cinematography: G. W. Bitzer
- Distributed by: General Film Company
- Release date: October 3, 1912
- Running time: 17 minutes
- Country: United States
- Language: Silent (English intertitles)

A Feud in the Kentucky Hills is a 1912 American silent drama film directed by D. W. Griffith. The film, by the Biograph Company, was shot on the Hudson Palisades near Fort Lee, New Jersey when many early film studios in America's first motion picture industry were based there at the beginning of the 20th century. Additional filming took place in and around the Pike County town of Milford, Pennsylvania.

== Plot ==
A psalm-singing dead shot proposes to the adopted daughter of his family. She turns him down, but under the mother's pressure, reluctantly gives in. The man's younger brother returns after a long stay in the valley. He and the girl have feelings for each other, and he kisses and embraces her. The older brother sees this and beats him up. For the sake of peace in the family, the young man agrees to leave.

Meanwhile the father and two of his sons go into town. The youngest, a boy, gets into a fight with a boy from another clan, and the other son shoots him, reigniting a dormant feud. The men of both clans arm themselves and gather for a showdown. Men are killed on both sides, but the first clan is greatly outnumbered. When only the psalm singer and the younger brother are left alive, the psalm singer sends the younger brother to get their parents and the girl to safety. As they are leaving, the old father turns back to join the fighting. When he is killed, the mother goes back and picks up his rifle, only to be shot dead herself. The surviving brother and the girl go to start a new life in the "peaceful valleys".

== Cast ==
- Mary Pickford as The Daughter
- Charles Hill Mailes as The Father
- Kate Bruce as The Mother
- Walter Miller as A Brother
- Robert Harron as A Brother
- Jack Pickford as A Brother
- Henry B. Walthall as Psalm Singer
- Elmer Booth as Second Clan Member
- William J. Butler as First Clan Member
- Harry Carey as Second Clan Member
- Frank Evans as Second Clan Member
- Harry Hyde as First Clan Member
- J. Jiquel Lanoe as Second Clan Member
- Adolph Lestina as Second Clan Member
- Frank Opperman as Second Clan Member
- W. C. Robinson as Second Clan Member

== See also ==
- List of American films of 1912
- Harry Carey filmography
- D. W. Griffith filmography
