= One Is Business, the Other Crime =

1912 film

- Directed by: D. W. Griffith
- Written by: George Hennessy
- Starring: Blanche Sweet; Charles West
- Cinematography: G. W. Bitzer
- Distributed by: Biograph Company
- Release date: April 25, 1912
- Running time: 15 minutes
- Country: United States
- Language: Silent (English intertitles)

One Is Business, the Other Crime is a 1912 American short silent drama film directed by D. W. Griffith and starring Blanche Sweet. Prints of the film survive in the film archives of the Library of Congress and the Museum of Modern Art.

== Cast ==
- Charles West as Poor Husband
- Dorothy Bernard as Poor Wife
- Edwin August as Rich Husband
- Blanche Sweet as Rich Wife
- Frank Evans as The Landlord
- Kate Bruce as The Maid
- William A. Carroll as A Foreman
- Robert Harron as Delivery Boy
- Frank Opperman as The Rich Man's Foreman
- Alfred Paget
- W. C. Robinson as Brickyard Worker
- Kate Toncray as A Maid

== See also ==
- List of American films of 1912
- D. W. Griffith filmography
- Blanche Sweet filmography
