= An Outcast Among Outcasts =

1912 film

- Directed by: D. W. Griffith; Wilfred Lucas
- Written by: George Hennessy
- Starring: Blanche Sweet; Frank Opperman
- Cinematography: G. W. Bitzer
- Distributed by: Biograph Company
- Release date: May 30, 1912
- Running time: 17 minutes
- Country: United States
- Language: Silent (English intertitles)

An Outcast Among Outcasts is a 1912 American short silent drama film directed by D. W. Griffith and Wilfred Lucas. It was Lucas's debut film as a director. The film starred Blanche Sweet.

== Cast ==
- Frank Opperman as The Blanket Tramp
- Blanche Sweet as The Young Woman
- W. Chrystie Miller as The Postmaster
- Charles West as The Station Master
- Kate Toncray as A Homemaker
- Dorothy Bernard
- William A. Carroll as A Tramp
- J. Jiquel Lanoe as A Factory Manager
- David Miles
- W. C. Robinson as A Tramp

== See also ==
- List of American films of 1912
- D. W. Griffith filmography
- Blanche Sweet filmography
