= The Burglar's Dilemma =

1912 film directed by D. W. Griffith

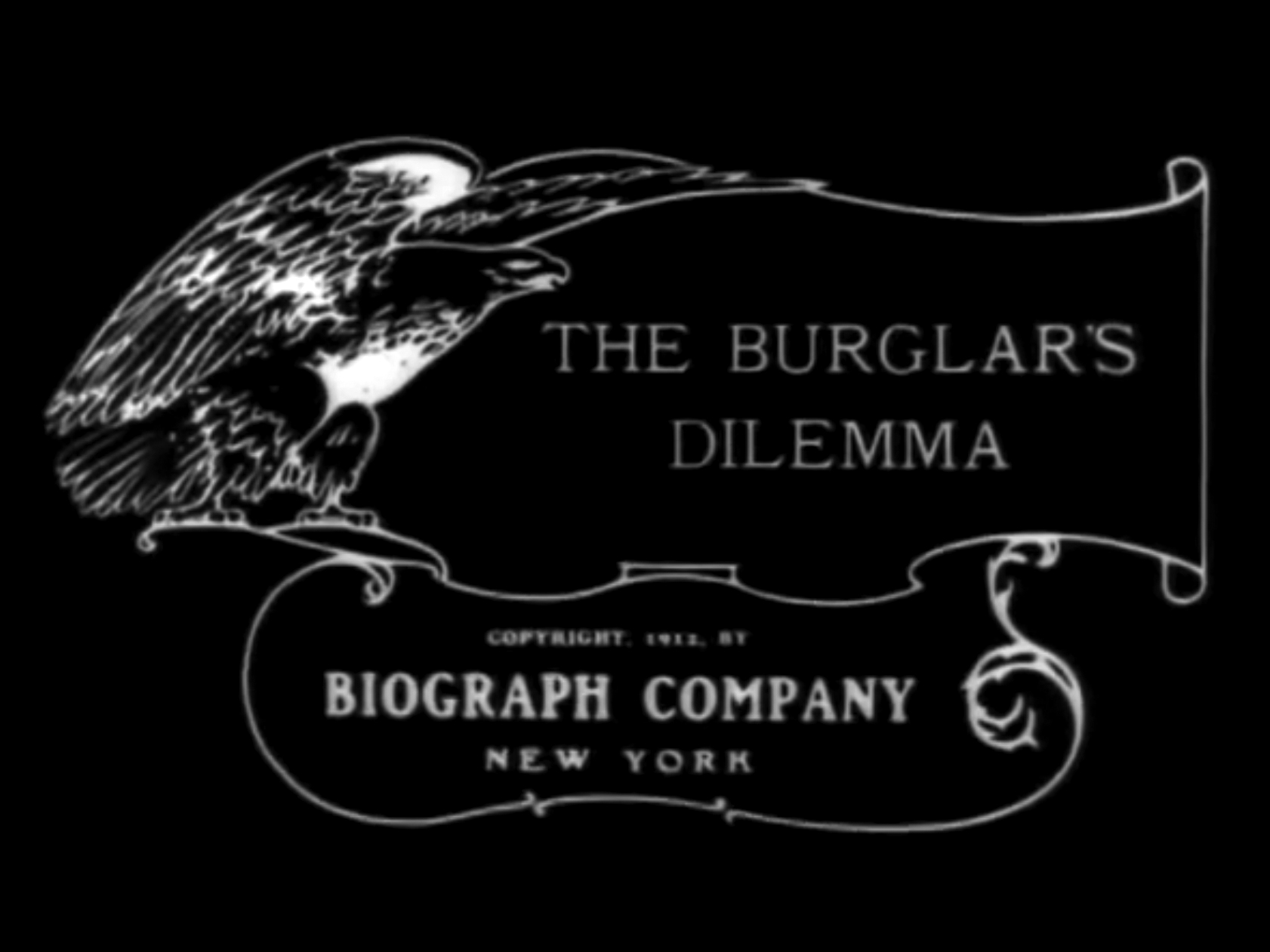
- Title card
- Directed by: D. W. Griffith
- Written by: Lionel Barrymore
- Starring: Lionel Barrymore
- Cinematography: G. W. Bitzer
- Distributed by: General Film Company
- Release date: December 16, 1912
- Running time: 15 minutes (18 frame/s)
- Country: United States
- Language: Silent (English intertitles)

The Burglar's Dilemma is a 1912 American drama film directed by D. W. Griffith. A print of the film survives.

Complete film

== Cast ==
- Lionel Barrymore as The Householder
- Henry B. Walthall as Householder's Weakling Brother
- Adolph Lestina as The Butler
- Gertrude Bambrick as Birthday Wellwisher
- Harry Carey as Older Crook
- John T. Dillon as Interrogating Detective
- Frank Evans as Policeman
- Dorothy Gish as Birthday Wellwisher
- Lillian Gish as Birthday Wellwisher
- Robert Harron as Young Burglar
- Madge Kirby as Birthday Wellwisher
- J. Jiquel Lanoe as Birthday Wellwisher
- Alfred Paget as Interrogating Detective
- W. C. Robinson as Policeman
- Charles West as Beat Cop / Medic

== See also ==
- Harry Carey filmography
- D. W. Griffith filmography
- Lillian Gish filmography
- Lionel Barrymore filmography
