= The Root of Evil (film) =

1912 film

- Directed by: D. W. Griffith
- Written by: George Hennessy
- Starring: William J. Butler; Dorothy Bernard; Edward Dillon
- Cinematography: G. W. Bitzer
- Distributed by: Biograph Company
- Release date: March 18, 1912
- Running time: 17 minutes
- Country: United States
- Language: Silent (English intertitles)

The Root of Evil is a 1912 American short silent drama film directed by D. W. Griffith and starring William J. Butler and Dorothy Bernard.

== Cast ==
- William J. Butler as the Wealthy Man
- Dorothy Bernard as the Wealthy Man's Daughter
- Edward Dillon as the Daughter's Husband
- J. Jiquel Lanoe as the Secretary
- Ynez Seabury as the Granddaughter
- Harry Hyde
- Alfred Paget as the Landlord
- Charles Hill Mailes as the Doctor
- John T. Dillon as the Lawyer

== See also ==
- List of American films of 1912
- D. W. Griffith filmography
