= The Stolen Loaf =

1913 film

- Directed by: D. W. Griffith
- Written by: Grace Barton
- Starring: Henry B. Walthall
- Cinematography: G. W. Bitzer
- Release date: May 10, 1913 (U.S.)
- Country: United States
- Language: Silent (English intertitles)

The Stolen Loaf is a 1913 American silent drama film, most likely directed by D. W. Griffith.

== Plot ==
The film follows a butler who steals a necklace from a rich woman and frames a poor man for the theft. The deception is revealed and the poor man receives justice at the end of the film.

== Cast ==
- Henry B. Walthall as the poor man
- Kate Bruce as the poor man's wife
- Claire McDowell as the rich woman
- Harry Carey as the butler
- William A. Carroll as at dinner
- Charles Hill Mailes as at dinner

== Development ==
The Stolen Loaf was filmed in March 1913 from a script written by Grace Barton. The exact identity of the director is unknown, with Linda Williams noting that surviving sources variously identify the director as D. W. Griffith or Anthony O'Sullivan. It was in released in theaters on May 15, 1913.

== Reception ==
The film received mixed reactions upon release, with a contemporary review in The Moving Picture World described audiences as laughing throughout serious scenes.

== See also ==
- Harry Carey filmography
- D. W. Griffith filmography
