= Won by a Fish =

- Directed by: Mack Sennett
- Written by: George Hennessy
- Distributed by: General Film Company
- Release date: April 22, 1912
- Running time: short
- Country: USA
- Language: Silent..English titles

Won by a Fish is a 1912 silent film comedy directed by Mack Sennett and starring Mary Pickford. It was produced by the Biograph Company and released as split-reel with The Brave Hunter by General Film Company.

This film exists.

== Cast ==
- Edward Dillon - Harry
- Mary Pickford - The Woman
- Dell Henderson - The Woman's Father
- Kate Bruce - The Maid
- William J. Butler- At Dinner
- Grace Henderson - At Dinner
- Charles Hill Mailes - At Dinner
- Kate Toncray - At Dinner

continuing cast

- Frank Evans - At Dinner
- Florence Lee - At Dinner
- W. C. Robinson - At Dinner
