= The Sorrowful Shore =

1913 film

- Directed by: D. W. Griffith
- Written by: Christy Cabanne
- Starring: Harry Carey
- Cinematography: G. W. Bitzer
- Release date: July 5, 1913 (U.S.)
- Running time: 17 minutes
- Country: United States
- Language: Silent (English intertitles)

The Sorrowful Shore is a 1913 American drama film directed by D. W. Griffith.

== Cast ==
- Harry Carey as the widowed father
- W. Christy Cabanne as the son
- Olive Carey as the orphan
- Frank Opperman as the orphan's father
- Robert Harron as one of the son's friends
- William Courtright as on shore
- J. Jiquel Lanoe as on shore
- Jennie Lee as on shore
- Adolph Lestina as on shore
- Mae Marsh as on shore

== See also ==
- Harry Carey filmography
- D. W. Griffith filmography
