= Pirate Gold (1913 film) =

1913 film

- Directed by: Wilfred Lucas
- Written by: George Hennessy
- Starring: Blanche Sweet
- Cinematography: G. W. Bitzer
- Distributed by: Biograph Company
- Release date: January 13, 1913
- Running time: 17 minutes (16 frame/s)
- Country: United States
- Language: Silent with English intertitles

Pirate Gold is a 1913 film starring Blanche Sweet and featuring Harry Carey.

== Cast ==
- Blanche Sweet as The Daughter
- Charles Hill Mailes as The Father
- J. Jiquel Lanoe as The Successful Suitor
- Hector Sarno as The Miscreant Sailor (credited as Hector V. Sarno)
- W. Chrystie Miller as The Old Mate
- Harry Carey
- Donald Crisp
- Joseph McDermott as In Crew
- Wallace Reid
