= A Welcome Intruder =

1913 film

- Directed by: D. W. Griffith
- Written by: Belle Taylor
- Produced by: Biograph Company
- Starring: Charles Hill Mailes; Kate Toncray
- Cinematography: G. W. Bitzer
- Distributed by: General Film Company
- Release date: March 24, 1913
- Running time: 2 reels
- Country: United States
- Language: Silent (English intertitles)

A Welcome Intruder is a 1913 silent film short directed by D. W. Griffith and produced by the Biograph Company.

== Cast ==
- Charles Hill Mailes as the father
- Kate Toncray as the neighbor
- Charles West as the workman
- W. Chrystie Miller as the shopkeeper
- Joseph McDermott as the policeman
- Frank Opperman as the hurdy-gurdy man
- Claire McDowell as a widow
- Adolph Lestina as the construction boss
- William A. Carroll as the wagon driver
- John T. Dillon as uncredited

== See also ==
- D. W. Griffith filmography
