= The Lady and the Mouse =

1913 film

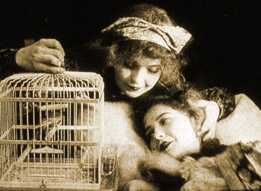
- Directed by: D. W. Griffith
- Written by: D. W. Griffith
- Starring: Lillian Gish
- Cinematography: G. W. Bitzer
- Production company: Biograph Company
- Distributed by: General Film Company
- Release date: April 26, 1913 (U.S.)
- Running time: 17 minutes
- Country: United States
- Language: Silent (English intertitles)

The Lady and the Mouse is a 1913 American short drama film directed by D. W. Griffith. A print of the film survives. Lillian and Dorothy Gish play sisters in the film. The only other two films where the Gishes play sisters are An Unseen Enemy (1912) and Orphans of the Storm (1922).

== Cast ==
- Lillian Gish as the young woman
- Lionel Barrymore as the young woman's father
- Harry Hyde as the rich man / tramp
- Dorothy Gish as the sick sister
- Kate Toncray as the aunt
- Robert Harron as the young friend
- Adolph Lestina as the doctor
- Henry B. Walthall as at garden party
- Viola Barry as at garden party
- J. Jiquel Lanoe as at garden party
- Mae Marsh as undetermined role (unconfirmed)
- Joseph McDermott as creditor
- Frank Opperman as creditor
- W. C. Robinson as creditor

== See also ==
- D. W. Griffith filmography
- Lillian Gish filmography
- Lionel Barrymore filmography
