= The Punishment (1912 film) =

1912 film

- Directed by: D. W. Griffith
- Written by: George Hennessy
- Starring: Blanche Sweet; J. Jiquel Lanoe
- Cinematography: G. W. Bitzer
- Distributed by: Biograph Company
- Release date: April 4, 1912
- Running time: 17 minutes
- Country: United States
- Language: Silent (English intertitles)

The Punishment is a 1912 American short silent drama film directed by D. W. Griffith and starring Blanche Sweet.

== Cast ==
- Blanche Sweet as The Fruit Grower's Daughter
- J. Jiquel Lanoe as The Father
- Kate Bruce as The Mother
- William J. Butler as The Landowner
- W. Christy Cabanne as The Landowner's Son
- Harry Hyde as Lucien, the Sweetheart
- Frank Opperman as The Old Gardener
- Verner Clarges
- Wilfred Lucas

== See also ==
- List of American films of 1912
- D. W. Griffith filmography
- Blanche Sweet filmography
