= Charles Hill Mailes =

Canadian actor (1870–1937)

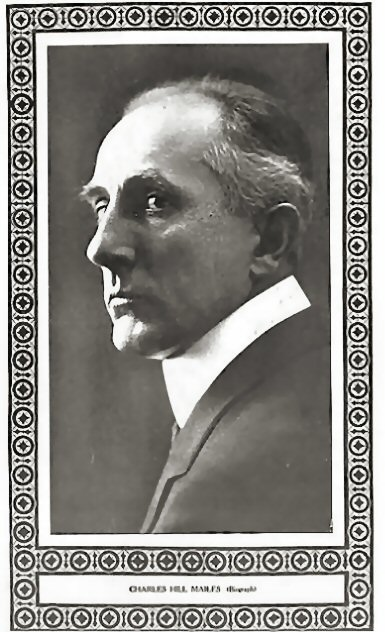
- Motion Picture Story Magazine, 1913
- Born: 25 May 1870; Halifax, Nova Scotia, Canada
- Died: 17 February 1937 (aged 66); Los Angeles, California, U.S.
- Occupation: Actor
- Years active: 1909–1935
- Spouse: Claire McDowell (m.1906)
- Children: 2

Charles Hill Mailes (25 May 1870 – 17 February 1937) was a Canadian actor of the silent era.

== Biography ==
Born in Halifax, Nova Scotia, in 1870, Mailes appeared in 290 films between 1909 and 1935. He married the actress Claire McDowell in 1906 and the happy couple appeared in numerous silent films together including The Mark of Zorro (1920). They had two sons, Robert and Eugene. He died in Los Angeles, California, in 1937.

== Selected filmography ==
- At the Altar (1909 short)
- May and December (1910 short)
- A Mohawk's Way (1910 short) - Indian
- Out from the Shadow (1911 short) - At Dance
- Swords and Hearts (1911 short) - Bushwhacker (uncredited)
- The Battle (1911 short) - The Union Commander
- The Miser's Heart (1911 short) - Second Crook
- A Woman Scorned (1911 short) - A Policeman
- The School Teacher and the Waif (1912 short) - Banjo player
- The Eternal Mother (1912 short) - Mary's Father
- For His Son (1912 short) - The Father - a Physician
- An Unseen Enemy (1912)
- Under Burning Skies (1912 short) - In Bar / At Farewell Party
- A String of Pearls (1912 short) - The Rich Doctor
- The Goddess of Sagebrush Gulch (1912)
- Won by a Fish (1912)
- The Lesser Evil (1912)
- Just Like a Woman (1912)
- A Beast at Bay (1912)
- A Temporary Truce (1912)
- Man's Lust for Gold (1912)
- The Sands of Dee (1912)
- The Inner Circle (1912)
- With the Enemy's Help (1912)
- A Change of Spirit (1912)
- Friends (1912)
- The Root of Evil (1912)
- So Near, yet So Far (1912)
- A Feud in the Kentucky Hills (1912)
- In the Aisles of the Wild (1912)
- The Painted Lady (1912)
- A Sailor's Heart (1912)
- Brutality (1912)
- The New York Hat (1912)
- My Hero (1912)
- The God Within (1912)
- The Telephone Girl and the Lady (1913)
- Pirate Gold (1913)
- An Adventure in the Autumn Woods (1913)
- A Misappropriated Turkey (1913)
- Brothers (1913)
- Oil and Water (1913)
- A Chance Deception (1913)
- The Wrong Bottle (1913)
- The Unwelcome Guest (1913)
- Near to Earth (1913)
- Fate (1913)
- A Welcome Intruder (1913)
- The Sheriff's Baby (1913)
- The Hero of Little Italy (1913)
- A Misunderstood Boy (1913)
- The Wanderer (1913)
- The Stolen Loaf (1913)
- The House of Darkness (1913)
- Olaf—An Atom (1913)
- A Dangerous Foe (1913)
- The Ranchero's Revenge (1913)
- Just Gold (1913)
- Red Hicks Defies the World (1913)
- The Mothering Heart (1913)
- The Mistake (1913)
- When Love Forgives (1913)
- Two Men of the Desert (1913)
- A Woman in the Ultimate (1913)
- A Modest Hero (1913)
- Madonna of the Storm (1913)
- The Battle at Elderbush Gulch (1913)
- The Yaqui Cur (1913)
- Almost a Wild Man (1913)
- Judith of Bethulia (1914)
- Brute Force (1914)
- Lord Chumley (1914)
- The Eagle's Wings (1916)
- The Lash of Power (1917)
- The Girl Who Won Out (1917)
- The Spotted Lily (1917)
- The Mysterious Mrs. M (1917)
- The Lair of the Wolf (1917)
- Money Madness (1917)
- The Bronze Bride (1917)
- Beloved Jim (1917)
- The Winged Mystery (1917)
- Polly Redhead (1917)
- Southern Justice (1917)
- Come Through (1917)
- The Brass Bullet (1918)
- Three Mounted Men (1918)
- The Girl Who Wouldn't Quit (1918)
- The Fighting Grin (1918)
- The Magic Eye (1918)
- The Talk of the Town (1918)
- The Lure of the Circus (1918)
- Fools and Their Money (1919)
- The Outcasts of Poker Flat (1919)
- Our Better Selves (1919)
- Full of Pep (1919)
- The Speed Maniac (1919)
- Haunting Shadows (1919)
- Go and Get It (1920)
- Homespun Folks (1920)
- The Mark of Zorro (1920)
- Chickens (1921)
- The Home Stretch (1921)
- The Spotted Lily (1917)
- Uncharted Seas (1921)
- Courage (1921)
- The Ten Dollar Raise (1921)
- The Lying Truth (1922)
- The Man from Downing Street (1922)
- Crashin' Thru (1923)
- The Bond Boy (1923)
- Held to Answer (1923)
- East Side - West Side (1923)
- Name the Man (1924)
- The Lighthouse by the Sea (1924)
- Thundering Hoofs (1924)
- When a Man's a Man (1924)
- The Fighting Demon (1925)
- The Crimson Runner (1925)
- Old Ironsides (1926)
- The Frontier Trail (1926)
- The Combat (1926)
- The Man in the Saddle (1926)
- The Social Highwayman (1926)
- Hearts and Fists (1926)
- The Better Man (1926)
- Exclusive Rights (1926)
- The Blue Streak (1926)
- Play Safe (1927)
- Somewhere in Sonora (1927)
- Bitter Apples (1927)
- Great Mail Robbery (1927)
- What a Night! (1928)
- Give and Take (1928)
- The Charge of the Gauchos (1928)
- Queen of the Chorus (1928)
- The Bellamy Trial (1929)
- The Faker (1929)
- Lilies of the Field (1930)
- Murder by Television (1935)
