= Kate Toncray =

American actress

- Born: 1878; St. Louis, Missouri, U.S.
- Died: December 6, 1927 (aged 59–60); Manhattan, New York City, U.S.
- Other name: Kate Toneray
- Occupation: Actress
- Years active: 1905–1925
- Spouse: John T. Doyle (m. 1902; div. 1906)

Kate Toncray (1878 – December 6, 1927) was an American character actress who appeared in films from 1914 through 1925. She was a stage actress prior to working in films.

== Early years ==
Tancray was born in St. Louis, Missouri, in 1878. She had a brother and a sister, and she was educated in St. Louis's public schools.

== Career ==
Toncray's stage debut came c. 1887 in a juvenile production of Cinderella. She acted on stage for producers Klaw and Erlanger, David Belasco, William A. Brady, Charles Frohman, the Shuberts, and others. Her experience included performing with stock theater companies in Denver and Louisville.

Toncray was described in contemporary publications as "at one time the original Biograph character woman" and "one of the best and most effective actresses on the speaking and screen stages". She worked under D. W. Griffith and with the Reliance, Majestic, and Triangle film companies.

== Personal life ==
Toncray married actor John T. Doyle in New York in 1902. They were divorced in December 1906.

== Selected filmography ==
- A Smoked Husband (1908)
- A Flash of Light (1910)
- His Trust (1911)
- Heart Beats of Long Ago (1911)
- Fisher Folks (1911)
- Her Awakening (1911)
- A Decree of Destiny (1911)
- Was He a Coward? (1911)
- The Spanish Gypsy (1911)
- The New Dress (1911)
- The Primal Call (1911)
- Fighting Blood (1911)
- The Indian Brothers (1911)
- Love in the Hills (1911)
- The Battle (1911)
- The Miser's Heart (1911)
- For His Son (1912)
- Under Burning Skies (1912)
- Won by a Fish (1912)
- One Is Business, the Other Crime (1912)
- An Outcast Among Outcasts (1912)
- The Sands of Dee (1912)
- The Inner Circle (1912)
- A Change of Spirit (1912)
- Blind Love (1912)
- Heredity (1912)
- A Welcome Intruder (1913)
- So Runs the Way (1913)
- Under the Shadow of the Law (1913)
- Red Hicks Defies the World (1913)
- The Wanderer (1913)
- The Lady and the Mouse (1913)
- The Hero of Little Italy (1913)
- Love in an Apartment Hotel (1913)
- Almost a Wild Man (1913)
- Brute Force (1914)
- Judith of Bethulia (1914)
- Old Heidelberg (1915)
- The Lamb (1915)
- Père Goriot (1915)
- Casey at the Bat (1916)
- Puppets (1916)
- The Little Yank (1917)
- Stage Struck (1917)
- Hands Up! (1917)
- Rebecca of Sunnybrook Farm (1917)
- The Hope Chest (1918)
- Boots (1919)
- Peppy Polly (1919)
- The Charm School (1921)
- Prisoners of Love (1921)
- The Match-Breaker (1921)
- Silent Years (1921)
- The Snowshoe Trail (1922)
- Bobbed Hair (1925)
- The Narrow Street (1925)
