= William J. Butler =

Irish actor

- Born: 1860; Dublin, Ireland
- Died: 27 January 1927 (aged 66-67); New York City, New York
- Years active: 1908–1917
- Spouse: Emma Lathrop
- Children: 2, including Larry Butler

William J. Butler (1860 – 27 January 1927) was an Irish silent film actor. He appeared in more than 260 films between 1908 and 1917.

An Irish immigrant to the United States, moved his family from Ohio to Hollywood, California in 1908.

On Broadway, Butler performed in The Serio-Comic Governess (1904), The Great Divide (1906), and Pippa Passes (1906).

At the age of 48, he wanted to get involved in a new industry called motion pictures. He appeared in more than 200 silent films. He made frequent appearances in films made by famed silent film producer/director D. W. Griffith, who made more than 500 films beginning in 1908. In addition to acting, Butler was a crew member and screenwriter of early films.

William's son, Larry Butler, born in Akron, Ohio, just before the family's move to Hollywood. Larry grew up in the film business, dropped out of Burbank High School to work with his father on special effects projects. In 1940, Larry won his first of two Oscars. He was nominated five times for Oscars. His first Oscar was for special effects work done on The Thief of Baghdad. Larry is credited with inventing the blue screen and the traveling matte, both processes were necessary for all special effects and are used today.

Butler's grandsons, Michael C. Butler and David Butler, became highly respected cinematographers. William's grandson, Christopher Butler, is also a cinematographer. The Butler family which began with William Butler in 1908 have made movies for 100 years, and the generations span the silent era, the studio era, the independent director era and the current era.

Butler was married to actress Emma Lathrop, and they had a daughter, actress Kathleen Butler, as well as their son. He died on 27 January 1927 in the Staten Island Hospital, aged 67.

== Selected filmography ==
- The Taming of the Shrew (1908)
- In Little Italy (1909)
- A Trap for Santa (1909)
- The Hessian Renegades (1909)
- The House with Closed Shutters (1910)
- A Flash of Light (1910)
- In the Border States (1910)
- The Modern Prodigal (1910) as a farmer
- A Mohawk's Way (1910) as servant
- Fisher Folks (1911)
- The Miser's Heart (1911)
- The Battle (1911)
- The Long Road (1911)
- The Making of a Man (1911)
- Her Awakening (1911)
- The Last Drop of Water (1911)
- Enoch Arden (1911)
- Priscilla and the Umbrella (1911)
- The Spanish Gypsy (1911)
- The Lily of the Tenements (1911)
- What Shall We Do with Our Old? (1911)
- The God Within (1912)
- Brutality (1912)
- Gold and Glitter (1912)
- The Painted Lady (1912)
- The Root of Evil (1912)
- In the Aisles of the Wild (1912)
- A Feud in the Kentucky Hills (1912)
- Blind Love (1912)
- A Change of Spirit (1912)
- Man's Lust for Gold (1912)
- The Punishment (1912)
- A Voice from the Deep (1912)
- A String of Pearls (1912)
- The Transformation of Mike (1912)
- Won by a Fish (1912)
- The Law and His Son (1913)
- The Stolen Treaty (1913)
- The Strong Man's Burden (1913)
- The Crook and the Girl (1913)
- The Enemy's Baby (1913)
- In Diplomatic Circles (1913)
- The Mothering Heart (1913)
- Red Hicks Defies the World (1913)
- A Timely Interception (1913)
- The House of Darkness (1913)
- The Tenderfoot's Money (1913)
- The Left-Handed Man (1913)
- The Hero of Little Italy (1913)
- Oil and Water (1913)
- The Yaqui Cur (1913)
- Almost a Wild Man (1913)
- Lord Chumley (1914)
- Brute Force (1914)
- Judith of Bethulia (1914)
- Strongheart (1914) as Manager of the Opposing Team
- Susie Snowflake (1916)
- The Great Secret (1917)
- A Girl Like That (1917)
