= W. C. Robinson =

American actor

Walter Charles Robinson
- Born: April 22, 1873; Manhattan, New York City
- Died: July 13, 1942 (aged 69); Maywood, California
- Occupation: Actor
- Years active: 1910–1932

Walter Charles Robinson (April 22, 1873 – July 13, 1942) was an American actor of the silent era.

== Biography ==
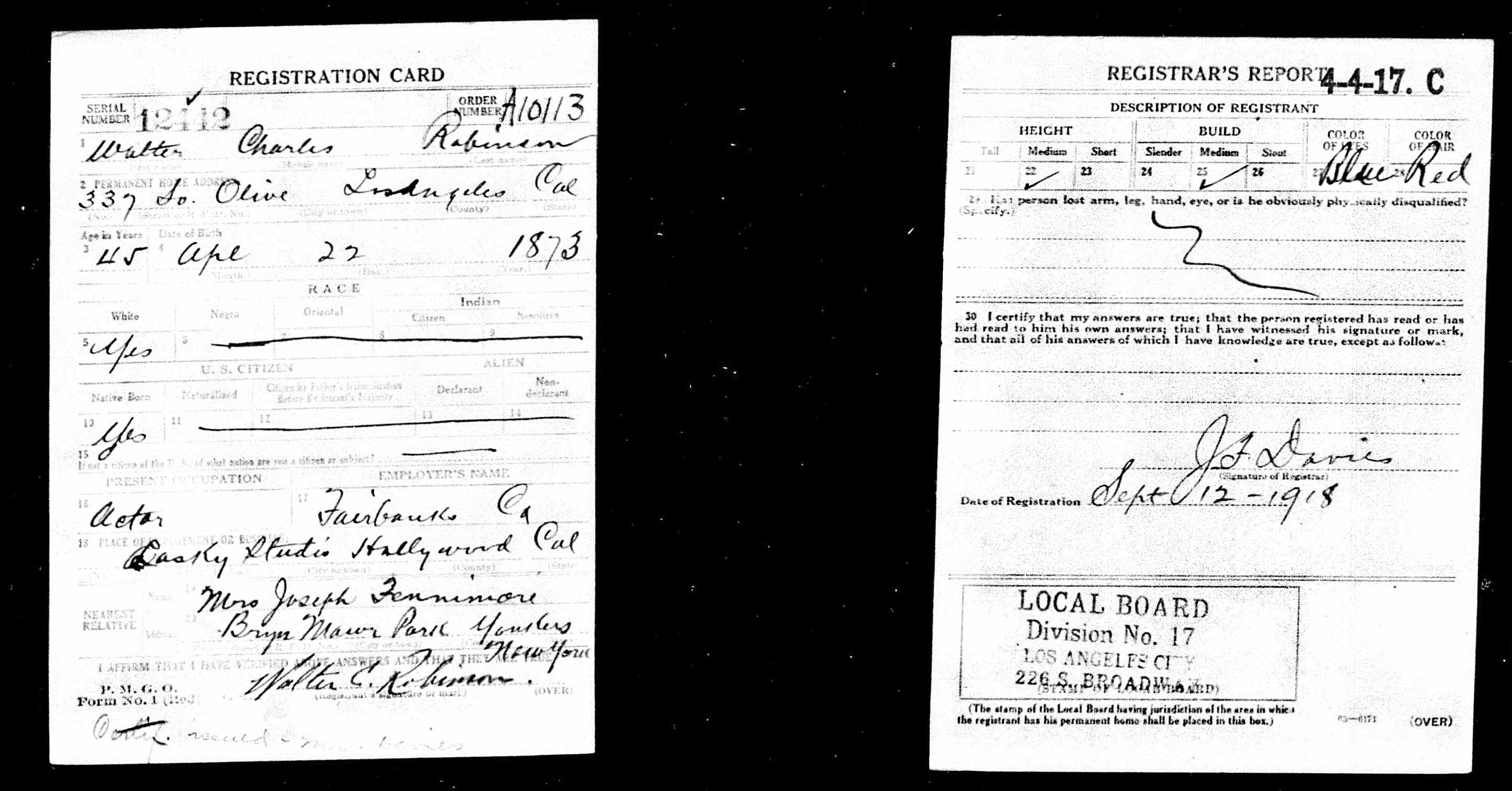
Robinson's World War I draft registration

Robinson was born on April 22, 1873, in Manhattan, New York City, to James H. Robinson and Emma Holzlander. He appeared in more than 170 films between 1910 and 1932. He died in Maywood, California, on July 13, 1942.

== Selected filmography ==
Year	Title	Role	Notes
1910	A Flash of Light	A Servant	Short
1910	The Fugitive	Confederate Soldier	Short
1910	A Mohawk's Way	Indian	
1911	His Trust		Short
1911	Fisher Folks		
1911	The Lonedale Operator	W.C. Robinson	Short
1911	What Shall We Do with Our Old?		Short, Uncredited
1911	The Lily of the Tenements	The Butler	Short
1911	Enoch Arden	Rescuer	Short
1911	The Indian Brothers		Short
1911	Her Awakening	Accident Witness	Short
1911	The Battle	A Union Soldier	Short, Uncredited
1911	The Miser's Heart		Short
1912	The Old Bookkeeper	A Policeman	Short
1912	For His Son		Short, Uncredited
1912	The Transformation of Mike		Short
1912	Under Burning Skies		Short
1912	The Goddess of Sagebrush Gulch	A Cowboy	Short, Uncredited
1912	Help! Help!	Burglar	Short
1912	Won by a Fish		Short
1912	One Is Business, the Other Crime	Brickyard Worker	Short, Uncredited
1912	The Lesser Evil		Short
1912	An Outcast Among Outcasts	A Tramp	Short
1912	A Temporary Truce		Short, Uncredited
1912	A Change of Spirit	Policeman	Short, Uncredited
1912	Blind Love		Short
1912	Two Daughters of Eve		Short
1912	Friends		Short, Uncredited
1912	So Near, yet So Far		Short
1912	A Feud in the Kentucky Hills	Second Clan Member	Short
1912	The Chief's Blanket	An Indian	Short
1912	The Musketeers of Pig Alley	Rival Gang Member	Short
1912	Heredity	Indian	Short
1912	Gold and Glitter	Lumberman	Short, Uncredited
1912	My Baby		Short
1912	The Informer	Union Soldier	Short
1912	Brutality		Short
1912	The New York Hat		Short, Uncredited
1912	My Hero		Short
1912	The Burglar's Dilemma	Policeman	Short
1912	The God Within		Short
1913	Three Friends		Short, Uncredited
1913	The Tender Hearted Boy		Short, Uncredited
1913	Love in an Apartment Hotel	Second Hotel Detective	Short
1913	The Wrong Bottle		Short, Uncredited
1913	The Unwelcome Guest		Short, Uncredited
1913	A Misunderstood Boy	Vigilante	Short, Uncredited
1913	The Lady and the Mouse	Creditor	Short, Uncredited
1913	The House of Darkness	Asylum Guard	Short, Uncredited
1913	Almost a Wild Man		Short, Uncredited
1913	The Mothering Heart		Short, Uncredited
1913	So Runs the Way	The Butler	Short
1913	Madonna of the Storm	The Waiter	Short
1913	The Battle at Elderbush Gulch		Short
1914	Judith of Bethulia	Bethulian Soldier	
1914	Strongheart	Team Assistant	Short
1914	Brute Force	Valet / Tribesman	Short
1917	The Great Secret		Serial
1917	In Again, Out Again	The Trustee	
1919	Thieves	Spike Robinson	
1920	Daredevil Jack	Gang Member	
1921	The Foolish Age	Todd	
1923	Boston Blackie	Shorty McNutt	
1925	The Fear Fighter		
1931	City Lights		Uncredited
1932	Madison Square Garden	Writer W. C. Robinson	
1933	The Bowery	Pug	Uncredited
