= Charles West (actor) =

American actor (1885–1943)

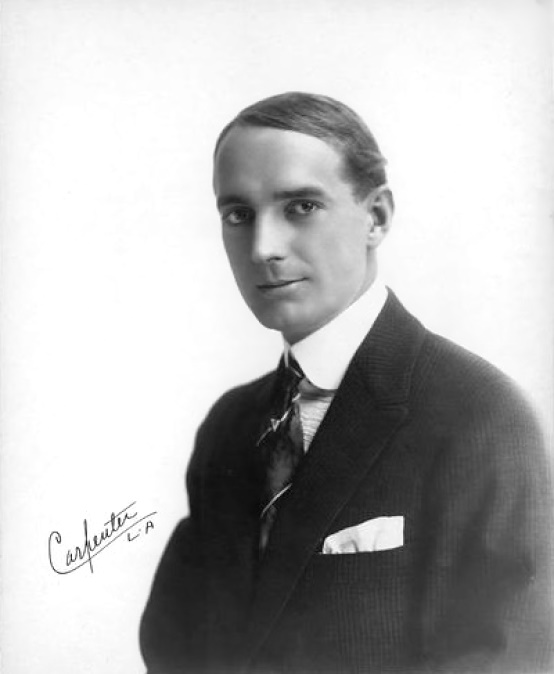
- West c. 1918
- Born: November 30, 1885; Pittsburgh, Pennsylvania, U.S.
- Died: October 10, 1943 (aged 57); Los Angeles, California, U.S.
- Occupation: Actor
- Years active: 1908–1937

Charles West (November 30, 1885 – October 10, 1943) was an American film actor of the silent film era. He appeared in more than 300 films between 1908 and 1937. He was born in Pittsburgh, Pennsylvania, and died in Los Angeles, California.

== Selected filmography ==
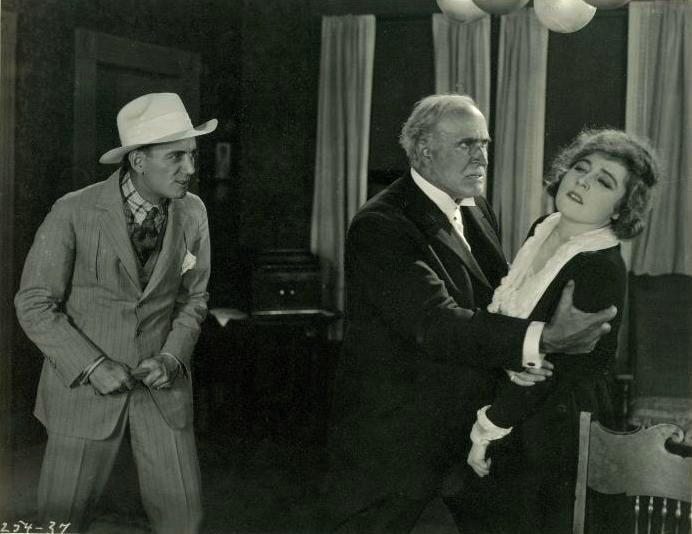
West (left) in The Girl Who Came Back (1918)

- The Christmas Burglars (1908 short)
- Love Finds a Way (1909 short)
- The Fascinating Mrs. Francis (1909 short)
- The Two Brothers (1910 short) - A Suitor / A Mexican
- A Romance of the Western Hills (1910 short) - The Nephew
- A Flash of Light (1910 short) - John Rogers
- The Lucky Toothache (1910 short) - One of the Boys
- The Fugitive (1910 short) - Confederate Soldier / Union Soldier
- What Shall We Do with Our Old? (1911 short)
- The Broken Cross (1911 short) - Tom
- How She Triumphed (1911 short)
- The Country Lovers (1911 short) - The Country Lover
- The New Dress (1911 short) - At Wedding / At Cafe
- Enoch Arden (1911 short) - In Bar
- The Indian Brothers (1911 short) - At Funeral
- The Last Drop of Water (1911 short) - Jim - Mary's Sweetheart
- Out from the Shadow (1911 short) - At Dance
- The Blind Princess and the Poet (1911 short) - The Poet
- The Long Road (1911 short) - Ned
- Love in the Hills (1911 short) - The Shiftless Suitor
- The Battle (1911 short) - The Boy
- Through Darkened Vales (1911 short) - Dave - Grace's Sweetheart
- The Old Bookkeeper (1912 short) - In Office
- For His Son (1912 short) - The Physician's Son
- Under Burning Skies (1912 short) - The Bartender
- A String of Pearls (1912 short) - The Poor Woman's Brother - the Neurasthenic Worker
- The Goddess of Sagebrush Gulch (1912 short) - Blue Grass Pete
- One Is Business, the Other Crime (1912 short) - The Poor Husband
- The Lesser Evil (1912 short) - The Go-Between
- A Lodging for the Night (1912 short) - Dick Logan
- An Outcast Among Outcasts (1912 short) - The Station Master
- A Temporary Truce (1912 short) - Minor Role (uncredited)
- The Spirit Awakened (1912 short)
- The Inner Circle (1912 short)
- With the Enemy's Help (1912 short) - The Prospector
- Blind Love (1912 short)
- The Chief's Blanket (1912 short) - The Outlaw
- A Sailor's Heart (1912 short) - On Street (uncredited)
- My Hero (1912 short) - Settler
- The Burglar's Dilemma (1912 short) - The Doctor
- The God Within (1912 short) - In Other Town
- A Misappropriated Turkey (1913 short) - The Striker
- Oil and Water (1913 short) - In First Audience / In Second Audience (uncredited)
- The Wrong Bottle (1913 short) - The Faithless Lover
- A Girl's Stratagem (1913 short) - The Lead Burglar
- A Welcome Intruder (1913 short) - The Workman
- The Hero of Little Italy (1913 short) - Joe
- The Stolen Bride (1913 short) - The Overseer
- A Frightful Blunder (1913 short) - The Young Businessman
- The Left-Handed Man (1913 short) - The Old Soldier's Daughter's Sweetheart
- The Wanderer (1913 short) - The Friar
- Just Gold (1913 short) - The Third Brother
- Red Hicks Defies the World (1913 short) - In Crowd (uncredited)
- The Switch Tower (1913 short) - Second Counterfeiter
- The Mothering Heart (1913 short) - The 'New Light' / Among Waiters
- In Diplomatic Circles (1913 short) - The Lover
- A Gamble with Death (1913 short) - The Gambler
- A Gambler's Honor (1913 short) - In Bar (uncredited)
- The Mirror (1913 short) - Second Tramp
- The Vengeance of Galora (1913 short) - The Express Agent
- When Love Forgives (1913 short) - Harry - the Confidential Clerk
- Under the Shadow of the Law (1913 short) - John Haywood - a Clerk
- I Was Meant for You (1913 short) - Theron
- A Modest Hero (1913 short) - A Crook / Cleaning Man
- A Tender-Hearted Crook (1913 short) - James
- The Stopped Clock (1913 short) - The Senior Clerk
- The Detective's Stratagem (1913 short) - First Plotter
- All for Science (1913 short) - In Restaurant (uncredited)
- Lord Chumley (1914 short) - The Butler
- The Heart of a Bandit (1915 short) - The Half-Bree
- His Desperate Deed (1915 short) - Grant
- The Love Transcendent (1915 short) - John Gag
- The Battle of Frenchman's Run (1915 short)
- The Sheriff's Dilemma (1915 short) - The Minister
- The Miser's Legacy (1915 short) - The Crook's Pal
- The Gambler's I.O.U. (1915 short) - Dick Smith
- A Double Winning (1915 short) - 1st Sportsman
- A Day's Adventure (1915 short) - Bentley
- Truth Stranger Than Fiction (1915 short) - The Novelist
- Her Dormant Love (1915 short) - The Attentive Husband
- The Burned Hand (1915 short)
- The Woman from Warren's (1915 short) - Hanson Landing
- Her Convert (1915 short) - The Old Inventor
- Little Marie (1915 short) - Beppo Puccini
- Old Offenders (1915 short) - Crooked Joe
- The Wood Nymph (1916) - William Jones
- Let Katie Do It (1916) - Caleb Adams
- Martha's Vindication (1916) - William Burton
- The Heart of Nora Flynn (1916) - Jack Murray
- A Gutter Magdalene (1916) - Jack Morgan
- The Dream Girl (1916) - 'English' Hal
- Betty to the Rescue (1917) - Fleming
- The American Consul (1917) - Pedro Gonzales
- Little Miss Optimist (1917) - Ben Carden
- The Little Pirate (1917) - George Drake
- The Trouble Buster (1917) - Tip Morgan
- Society's Driftwood (1917) - Tison Grant
- The Flash of Fate (1918) - Philadelphia Johnson
- Revenge (1918) - Donald Jaffray
- The White Man's Law (1918) - The Derelict
- Shackled (1918) - Walter Cosgrove
- The Ghost Flower (1918) - La Farge
- The Source (1918) - Paul Holmquist
- The Girl Who Came Back (1918) - Ralph Burton
- The Mystery Girl (1918) - Chester Naismith
- Wife or Country (1918 short) - Jack Holiday
- A Very Good Young Man (1919) - Minor Role
- The Woman Michael Married (1919) - Harvey Kirkland
- His Divorced Wife (1919) - Rufus Couch
- The Phantom Melody (1920) - Gregory Baldi
- The River's End (1920) - Peter Kirkstone
- Polly of the Storm Country (1920) - Oscar Bennett
- Parlor, Bedroom and Bath (1920) - Jeffery Haywood
- Go and Get It (1920) - Slim Hogan
- A Thousand to One (1920) - Jimmy Munroe
- Not Guilty (1921) - Herbert Welch
- The Witching Hour (1921) - Tom Denning
- Bob Hampton of Placer (1921) - Maj. Brant
- The Lane That Had No Turning (1922) - Havel
- Manslaughter (1922) - Member of the Jury (uncredited)
- Love in the Dark (1922) - Jimmy Watson
- Red Lights (1923) - The Conductor
- The Eternal Three (1923) - Butler
- Times Have Changed (1923) - Al Keeley
- Held to Answer (1923) - 'Spider' Welch
- The Talker (1925) - Detective
- The Overland Limited (1925) - Bitter Root Jackson
- The Part Time Wife (1925) - Allen Keane
- The Fate of a Flirt (1925) - Eddie Graham
- The Road to Yesterday (1925) - Wyatt Earnshaw
- The Skyrocket (1926) - Edward Kimm (prologue)
- Snowed In (1926 serial) - Harron
- The House Without a Key (1926 serial) - Bowker
- Nobody's Widow (1927) - Valet
- The King of Kings (1927) - (uncredited)
- On the Stroke of Twelve (1927) - Charles Wright
- The Man from Headquarters (1928) - No. 1
- Handcuffed (1929)
- Acquitted (1929) - Henchman McManus
- For the Defense (1930) - Joe
- The Dawn Trail (1930) - Bartender (uncredited)
- Along Came Youth (1930) - Chauffeur
- The Texas Ranger (1931) - Bartender (uncredited)
- Law of the West (1932) - Dad Tracy
- The Man from Hell's Edges (1932) - Informant (uncredited)
- Law of the North (1932) - Bartender (uncredited)
- I Love That Man (1933) - Alarm Company Agent (uncredited)
- Police Car 17 (1933) - Harry
- Duck Soup (1933) - Minister (uncredited)
- Good Dame (1934) - Minor Role (uncredited)
- The Man Trailer (1934) - Gorman
- The Mighty Barnum (1934) - Hotel Porter (uncredited)
- Death from a Distance (1935) - Fingerprint Expert (uncredited)
- Barbary Coast (1935) - Gambler (uncredited)
- The Bride Comes Home (1935) - Bystander (uncredited)
- The Prisoner of Shark Island (1936) - Washington (DC) Citizen (uncredited)
- Don't Tell the Wife (1937) - Joe 'Hoss' Hoskins (uncredited)
- The Grapes of Wrath (1940) - Migrant (uncredited)
