= The Conscience of Hassan Bey =

1913 film

- Directed by: D. W. Griffith; Christy Cabanne
- Starring: William A. Carroll; Lillian Gish
- Release dates: December 20, 1913 (U.S.); December 18, 1916 (U.S. reissue)
- Running time: 10 minutes
- Country: United States
- Language: Silent (English intertitles)

The Conscience of Hassan Bey is a 1913 American short drama film directed by D. W. Griffith and Christy Cabanne. The film was reissued in 1916. A print exits in the Museum of Modern Art film archive.

== Plot ==
In Persia, a rug maker's daughter and a young man employed by her father are in love. When the local bey visits the shop to commission a rug, he becomes infatuated with the young woman and later sends his servant, Timur, to bring her to the palace.

At the palace, she rejects the bey's advances, affirming her love for the young man, who has followed her and is quietly admitted by Timur. Timur, who resents the palace favorite, observes the encounter with satisfaction.

Angered by her refusal, the bey orders both the woman and her lover imprisoned in a dungeon with wild animals. Around this time, an Egyptian snake charmer arrives and sells the bey a poisonous viper. At Timur's suggestion, the viper is hidden in the favorite's jewel box. She is bitten and dies. The bey blames the snake charmer.

The woman is brought from the dungeon, but again refuses the bey and collapses. Confronted with her loyalty and his guilt, the bey releases the couple. He then returns to the jewel box, places his hand inside, and is fatally bitten. He dies beside the woman he wronged. Timur later finds his body.

== Cast ==
- William A. Carroll as Timur
- Lillian Gish as the rug maker's daughter
- Robert Harron as her sweetheart
- Alfred Paget as the rug maker
