= The Adventures of Billy =

1911 film directed by D. W. Griffith

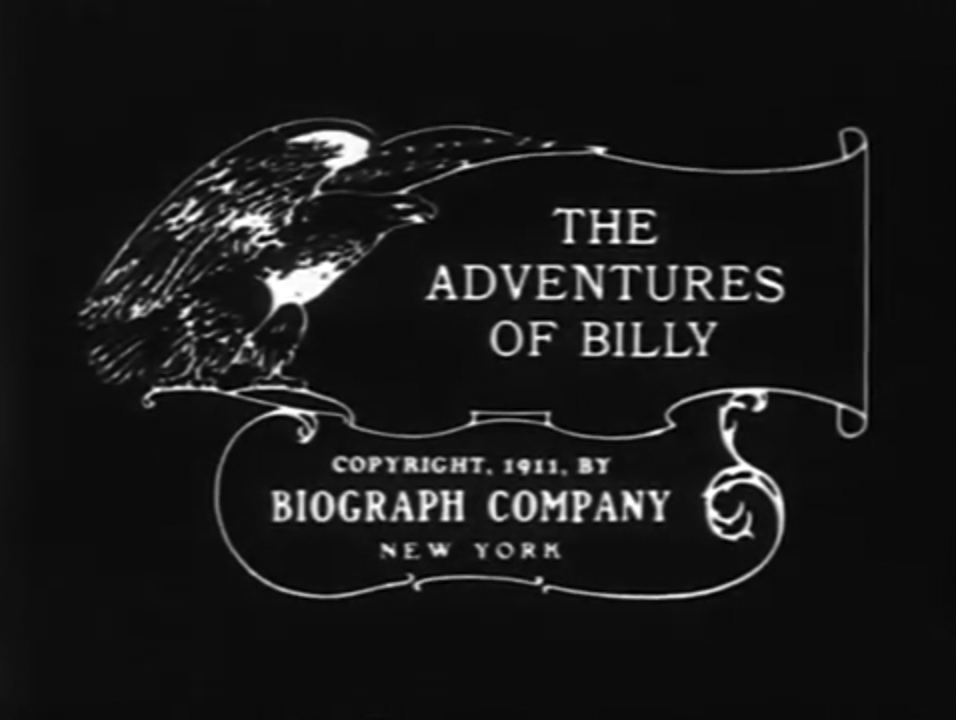
- Directed by: D. W. Griffith
- Written by: James Carroll
- Produced by: American Mutoscope and Biograph Company
- Starring: Edna Foster; Donald Crisp
- Cinematography: Billy Bitzer
- Distributed by: General Film Company
- Release date: October 19, 1911 (U.S.)
- Running time: 18 minutes
- Country: United States
- Language: Silent (English intertitles)

The Adventures of Billy is a 1911 silent short drama film directed by D. W. Griffith. It is one of many Griffith short films preserved by paper print and is available for viewing today.

The Adventures of Billy (1911) in full

== Cast ==
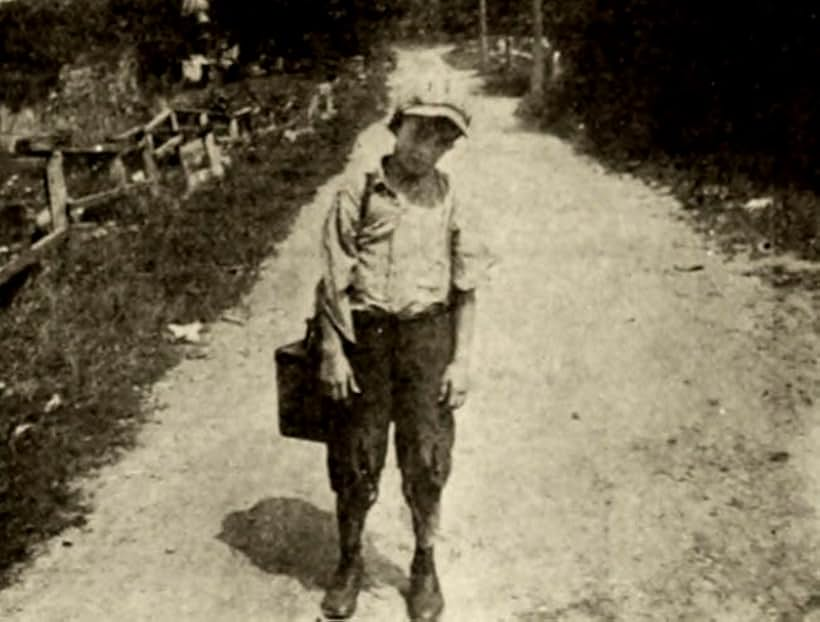
Edna Foster in The Adventures of Billy

- Edna Foster as Billy
- Donald Crisp as first tramp
- Joseph Graybill as second tramp
- Dell Henderson as rich man
- Claire McDowell as rich woman
- Kate Bruce as maid
- Frank Evans as farmer
- W. Chrystie Miller as robbery victim
- D. W. Griffith as on bench (uncredited)
- Grace Henderson as woman on porch (uncredited)
- Harry Hyde as on lawn (uncredited)
- Charles Hill Mailes as farmhand/rescuer (uncredited)
- Alfred Paget as farmhand/rescuer (uncredited)
- Donald Crisp as thug (uncredited)
