= Edna Foster =

American silent film era actress

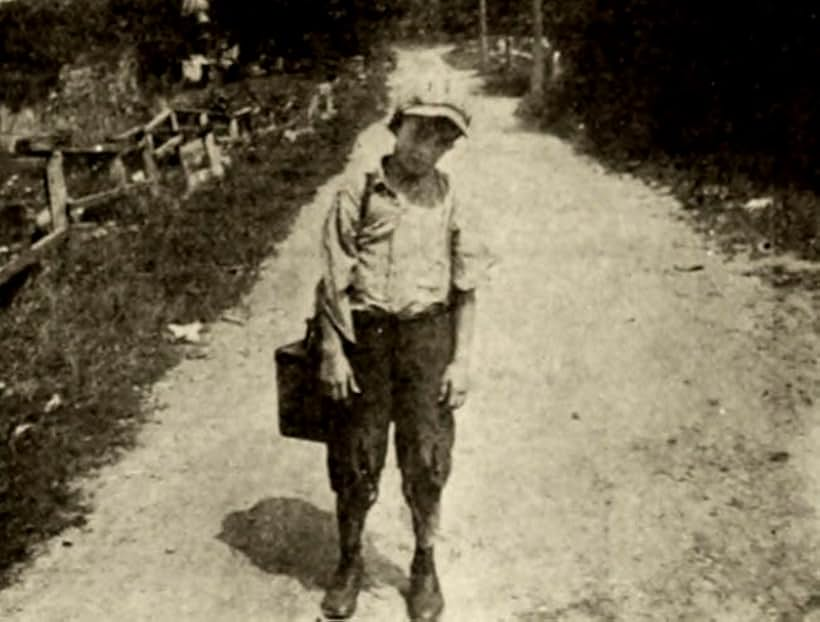
- Edna Foster in The Adventures of Billy (1911)
- Born: 1900; Boston, Massachusetts, USA
- Other names: Billy Foster
- Occupation: Actress
- Years active: 1911–1915
- Spouse: Frank Schleip (1921–1927)
- Children: 1
- Relatives: Flora Foster (sister)

Edna Foster was an American child actress who was active during the silent film era.

== Biography ==
Edna Foster was born in Boston in 1900 to Anne Louise Ramsell Foster and Conrad Houteling Foster. Conrad Foster was a theater owner and eventual mayor of Traverse City, Michigan. He had been in the entertainment business since 1889 and assistant treasurer for Ringling Brothers circus for 14 years.

=== Entertainment career ===
Foster acted in films for the Biograph Company. She played both boys and girls in film. She received critical attention for her work "as one of the best known boy impersonators" in film. She was sometimes professionally known as "Billy Foster;" she selected the name herself.

Edna Foster's older sister Flora Foster, also an actress, died of heart failure as a teenager. Both sisters attended boarding school in New York near Biograph's studios while their father remained in Chicago.

Foster's favorite stage actress was Blanche Sweet. She and her sister both enjoyed working with D.W. Griffith and Harry Carey. She enjoyed sewing, ragtime music, baseball, rugby, and dancing; her sister stated that Foster had aspirations for a career in ballet. She was reportedly a protégé of Elizabeth Kingston of the Kingston Entertainers. In 1922, she was working as assistant treasurer for Minksy's Burlesque.

She had grey eyes. When she was fourteen, she had blonde hair she wore bobbed. She was described as a "pretty, slender brunette" in a 1922 issue of The Billboard.

=== Personal life ===
Edna Foster married Frank Otto Schleip on March 8, 1921, but she separated from him and was living under her maiden name by 1925. She and Schleip divorced on January 6, 1927. Foster had a daughter, Anna, around the time of her divorce; she and her daughter were known by the surname Carella.

According to her father's obituary, Edna Foster was living in New York City in 1940.

== Selected filmography ==
- Men and Women (1914)
- The Escape (1914)
- A Nest Unfeathered (1914)
- The Little Tease (1913)
- A Misappropriated Turkey (1913)
- With the Enemy's Help (1912)
- A String of Pearls (1912)
- The School Teacher and the Waif (1912)
- The Sunbeam (1912)
- The Transformation of Mike (1912)
- For His Son (1912)
- The Battle (1911)
- The Adventures of Billy (1911)
- A Country Cupid (1911)
- The Lonedale Operator (1911)
