= Drink's Lure =

1913 film by D. W. Griffith

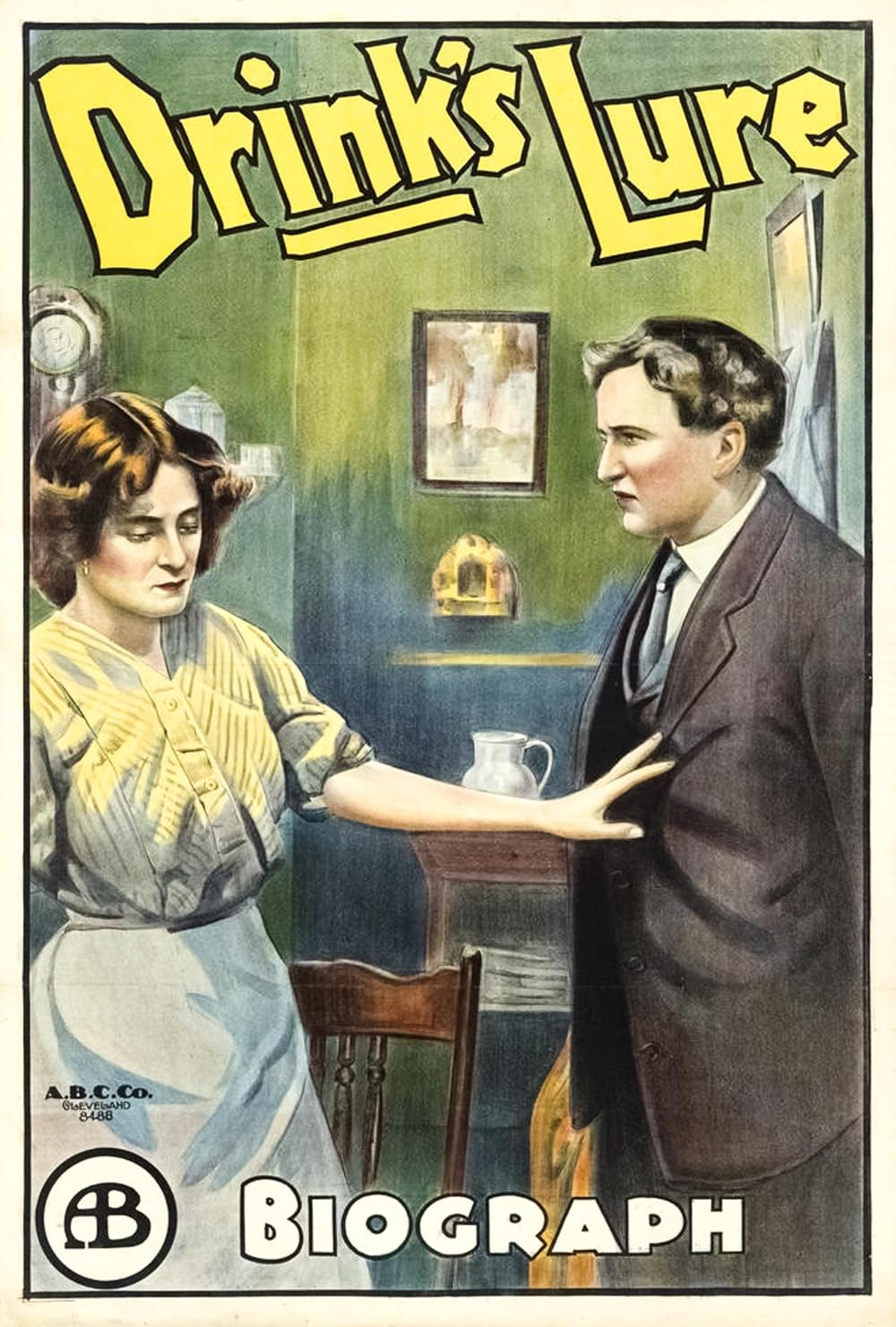
- Theatrical release poster
- Directed by: D. W. Griffith
- Written by: George Hennessy
- Cinematography: G. W Bitzer
- Production company: Biograph Company
- Distributed by: General Film Company
- Release date: February 17, 1913 (Note: Some sources list the release year as 1912.)
- Running time: 17 minutes
- Country: United States

Drink's Lure is a 1913 American drama film directed by D. W. Griffith. The film was released on February 17, 1913. It was the last film Griffith directed at the Biograph Company's 11 East 14th Street studio.

== Cast ==
- Hector Dion as the Alcoholic husband
- Claire McDowell
- Kate Bruce as Salvation Anne
- Matt B. Snyder
- Elmer Booth as the burglar
- Alfred Paget as the policeman
