= A Regular Fellow =

A Regular Fellow may refer to:

- A Regular Fellow (1919 film), 1919 silent American film directed by Christy Cabanne
- A Regular Fellow (1925 film), 1925 silent American film directed by A. Edward Sutherland
