= Fighting Blood (1911 film) =

1911 film directed by D. W. Griffith

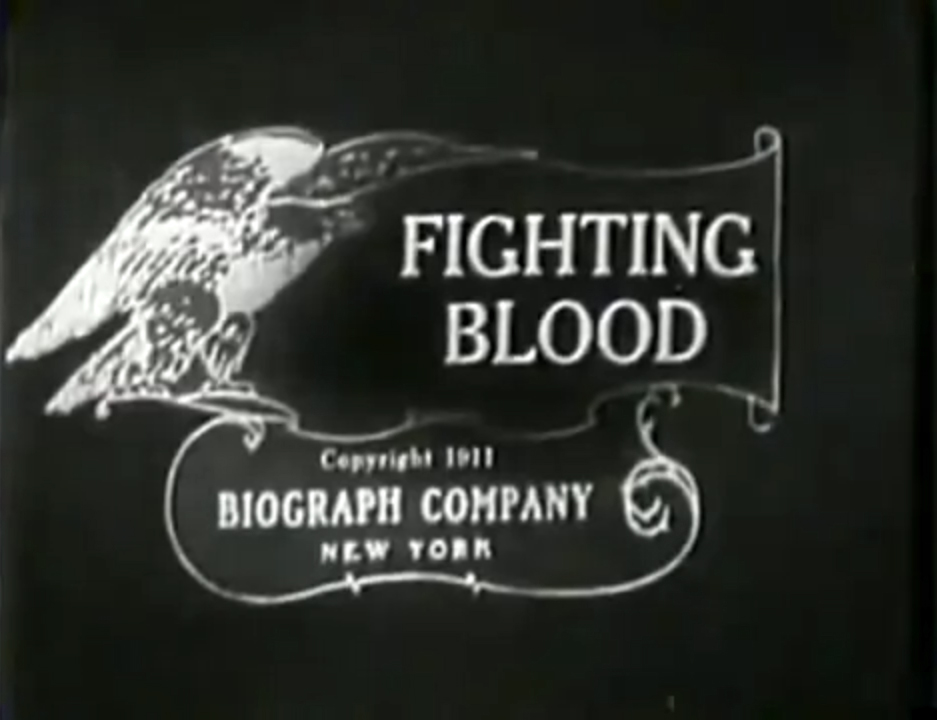
- Title card
- Directed by: D. W. Griffith
- Produced by: D. W. Griffith
- Starring: George Nichols; Robert Harron
- Cinematography: G. W. Bitzer
- Production company: Biograph Company
- Distributed by: General Film Company
- Release date: June 29, 1911
- Running time: 18 minutes
- Country: United States
- Language: Silent (English intertitles)

Full movie

Fighting Blood is a 1911 American short silent Western film directed by D. W. Griffith, starring George Nichols and Robert Harron, and produced by the Biograph Company.

A band of Sioux attack an isolated family cabin. Of Griffith's 30 films involving Native Americans, this is one of the eight that portray them as villains.

== Plot ==
In Dakota, a bearded veteran of the American Civil War drills his nine offspring, ranging in age from a young man to a child, and his wife. The "Grand Army of the Dakota Hills" marches around and raises the flag. Afterward, "Corporal Richard", the eldest son, goes out to see his girlfriend, against his father's strict orders. When he returns, Richard finds the family cabin's door locked.

Richard spots a band of Sioux on the rampage. He rides hard and warns his girlfriend's family, who race away aboard a covered wagon. They are chased by the Sioux, and one settler is killed in the running gunfight. Richard takes the girl away on foot and deposits her with his family in their cabin, while he rides away for help. A fierce gunfight breaks out, with some of the neighbors joining in. The Indians set the cabin on fire, and the defenders run out of water. Richard kills one of his two pursuers and drives the other off. He returns with reinforcements in the form of the cavalry to save the day.

== Cast ==
- George Nichols as the old soldier
- Kate Bruce as the old soldier's wife
- Robert Harron as the old soldier's son
- Gladys Egan
- Florence La Badie as the son's girlfriend
- Kate Toncray as the son's girlfriend's mother
- Francis J. Grandon as the son's girlfriend's father
- William J. Butler as a settler
- W. C. Robinson as a settler
- Alfred Paget as a soldier
- Dell Henderson as a soldier
- Edward Dillon as the wagon driver / among Indians

A Museum of Modern Art catalog claims Lionel Barrymore appears in one of his earliest Biograph film roles, identifying him in a photo as one of the two settlers who enter and defend the cabin, and silentera.com agrees he is in the film, but The Griffith Project: Volume 5 does not list him.

== Production ==
The film was shot near Lookout Mountain in California's San Fernando Valley.

== Preservation status ==
A print survives in the film archive of George Eastman House Motion Picture Collection. Unfortunately, the only available print is "missing much of the climactic battle scene". In 2001, it was announced that George Eastman House had been awarded funding from the National Film Preservation Foundation to preserve the film.

== See also ==
- List of American films of 1911
