= The Yaqui Cur =

1913 film directed by D. W. Griffith

- Directed by: D. W. Griffith
- Written by: Stanner E.V. Taylor
- Screenplay by: Stanner E. V. Taylor
- Produced by: American Mutoscope and Biograph Company
- Starring: Robert Harron; Kate Bruce; Walter Miller
- Cinematography: G. W. Bitzer
- Distributed by: General Film Company; Silent Hall of Fame Enterprises
- Release date: May 17, 1913 (U.S.)
- Running time: 33 minutes
- Country: United States
- Language: Silent (English intertitles)

The Yaqui Cur is a 1913 American silent Western black and white film directed by D. W. Griffith, written by Stanner E.V. Taylor, and starring Robert Harron, Kate Bruce, Walter Miller, Charles Hill Mailes, and Victoria Forde. The film was one of seven multi-reel works Griffith directed that year, alongside The Little Tease (1913). The film has been preserved and released on VHS and DVD.

The film has been noted for its formal experimentation, particularly in staging and expressive use of gesture. Scholars have described it as one of Griffith's most unusual productions. The narrative centers on a romantic relationship between a Native American woman and a white man.

The Yaqui Cur (1913)

== Cast ==
- Robert Harron as Strongheart, a Yaqui youth
- Kate Bruce as Strongheart's mother
- Walter Miller as Ocallo, Strongheart's friend
- Lionel Barrymore as The Easterner
- Frank Opperman as the preacher
- Charles Hill Mailes as the Yaqui chief / goldseeker
- Victoria Forde as the Yaqui chief's daughter
- Jennie Lee as Yaqui woman
- William J. Butler as in tribe / goldseeker
- Christy Cabanne as undetermined minor role
- Frank Evans as goldseeker
- Charles Gorman as in tribe
- Harry Hyde as goldseeker
- J. Jiquel Lanoe as in tribe
- Audrey Littlefield as Yaqui child
- Joseph McDermott as goldseeker
- Alfred Paget as in tribe
- Baby Lillian Wade as Yaqui child

== See also ==
- D. W. Griffith filmography
- Lionel Barrymore filmography
