= A Cry for Help (1912 film) =

1912 film

- Directed by: D. W. Griffith
- Written by: Edward Acker
- Starring: Lionel Barrymore
- Cinematography: G. W. Bitzer
- Distributed by: General Film Company
- Release date: December 23, 1912
- Running time: 17 minutes (16 frame/s)
- Country: United States
- Language: Silent (English intertitles)

A Cry for Help is a 1912 American drama film directed by D. W. Griffith.

== Cast ==
- Lionel Barrymore as The Bum
- Walter Miller as The Doctor
- Lillian Gish as The Maid
- Harry Carey as The Thief
- Kate Bruce as Undetermined Role
- W. Christy Cabanne as Witness to Accident
- John T. Dillon as Policeman / Witness to Accident
- Dorothy Gish as Witness to Accident
- Robert Harron as Witness to Accident
- Claire McDowell as Charity Patient
- Alfred Paget as Policeman

== See also ==
- List of American films of 1912
