= Just Gold =

1913 film

- Directed by: D. W. Griffith
- Written by: D. W. Griffith
- Starring: Lionel Barrymore
- Cinematography: G. W. Bitzer
- Distributed by: General Film Company
- Release date: May 24, 1913 (U.S.)
- Running time: 17 minutes
- Country: United States
- Language: Silent (English intertitles)

Just Gold is a 1913 American short drama film directed by D. W. Griffith.

== Cast ==
- Lionel Barrymore as first brother
- Alfred Paget as second brother
- Charles West as third brother
- Joseph McDermott as fourth brother
- Kate Bruce as the mother
- Charles Hill Mailes as the father
- Lillian Gish as the sweetheart
- Dorothy Gish as the sweetheart's friend
- Kathleen Butler as at farewell
- Adolph Lestina as at farewell / in town
- W. Chrystie Miller
- Frank Opperman as at farewell / in town

== See also ==
- D. W. Griffith filmography
- Lillian Gish filmography
- Lionel Barrymore filmography
