= Enoch Arden (1915 film) =

1915 film

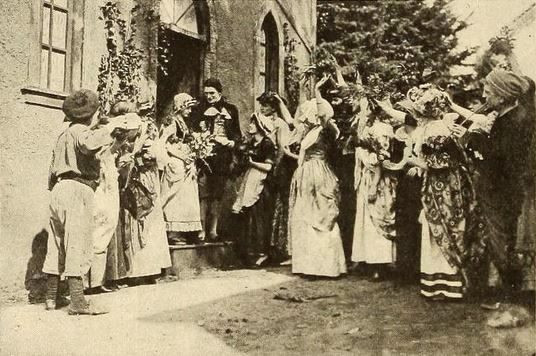
- Film still of the wedding of Enoch and Annie
- Directed by: Christy Cabanne
- Written by: D. W. Griffith
- Based on: Enoch Arden by Tennyson
- Starring: Alfred Paget; Lillian Gish
- Cinematography: William Fildew
- Distributed by: Mutual Films Corporation
- Release date: April 8, 1915
- Running time: 40 minutes
- Country: United States
- Language: Silent (English intertitles)

Enoch Arden is a 1915 American silent short drama film directed by Christy Cabanne. It is based on the 1864 poem Enoch Arden by Tennyson. Prints of the film exists at the George Eastman Museum Motion Picture Collection and the UCLA Film & Television Archive.

== Plot ==
Based on a summary in a film magazine, Enoch, Annie, and Walter grow up as friends. Later, Annie decides to marry Enoch, but Walter, though bitter about the decision, remains their friend. Enoch and Annie have two children. Then business takes Enoch on a sailing voyage, which he states will take less than one year, and he asks Walter to look over his family while he is gone. Enoch does not return, and Walter dutifully cares after Enoch's wife and children. After ten years word comes of a wreck seen in the Pacific, and everyone believes Enoch has died. Walter and Annie then marry. One night a stranger comes to the house and through a window sees Walter, Annie, and the children happy. The stranger, who is Enoch, finds an old woman who tells him what happened. Enoch tells her to keep his secret, and then leaves. He later dies with a smile on his face.

== Cast ==
- Alfred Paget as Enoch Arden
- Lillian Gish as Annie Lee
- Wallace Reid as Walter Fenn
- D. W. Griffith as Mr. Ray
- Mildred Harris as A Child

== 1922 reissue ==
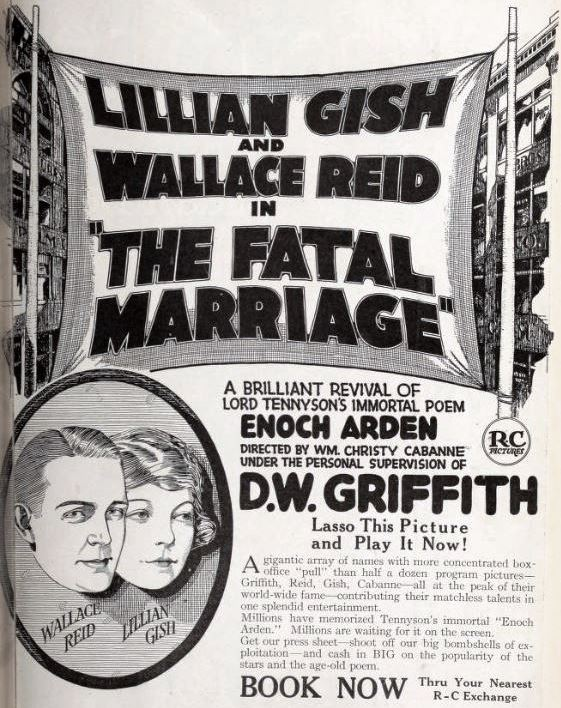
Advertisement for The Fatal Marriage, 1922 reissue title of the film Enoch Arden (1915)

The film was reissued in 1922 under the title The Fatal Marriage by Robertson-Cole.
