= A Timely Interception =

1913 film directed by D. W. Griffith

- Directed by: D. W. Griffith
- Written by: Christy Cabanne
- Starring: W. Chrystie Miller
- Cinematography: G. W. Bitzer
- Distributed by: General Film Company
- Release dates: June 7, 1913 (U.S.); July 9, 1913 (U.S. reissue)
- Running time: 17 minutes (16 frame/s)
- Country: United States
- Language: Silent (English intertitles)

A Timely Interception is a 1913 American short drama film directed by D. W. Griffith. The film was reissued by Biograph in 1915.

== Preservation status ==
The film has been preserved and is held in the collection of the Bibliothèque nationale de France. It has been released on VHS as well.

== Plot ==
Jed Simmons, an aging farmer, has spent years saving to support his daughter Jennie's marriage to his adopted son Joe. Just as he secures the necessary funds, he receives word that his brother Jim has lost his job in the nearby oil fields and that Jim's young daughter is gravely ill. Jed sacrifices the savings he intended as Jennie's dowry to cover medical expenses, and the wedding is postponed.

Although Jed has quietly supported his family for decades, he is seen by others, including Jim, as miserly. As financial hardship worsens, Jed puts the farm up for sale to repay debts from a failed harvest and a difficult winter. An oil prospector discovers oil on the property, takes an option on it, and promises to return with investors.

While digging postholes, Joe and Jim discover oil themselves. As they hurry to deliver the news, they fall into an old well, from which Joe escapes. Meanwhile, the group of investors races to the farm by motor car, only to be delayed by a traffic policeman who has spotted Jennie clinging to the back of the car. The investors pressure Jed to finalize the sale, but just before he signs the deed, Joe arrives and halts the transaction by revealing the oil discovery. Jed retains the farm, and with the family's financial problems resolved, Jennie and Joe marry.

== Cast ==
- W. Chrystie Miller as Jed Simmons, the farmer
- Lillian Gish as Jennie, the farmer's daughter
- Robert Harron as Joe, the farmer's adopted son
- Lionel Barrymore as Jim Simmons, the farmer's brother
- Joseph McDermott as the oil syndicate
- William J. Butler as the oil syndicate
- Alfred Paget as the oil syndicate
- Frank Evans as first foreman
- Frank Opperman as second foreman
- Adolph Lestina as the farmer's brother's friend
- Charles Gorman as the policeman
- Christy Cabanne
- Mae Marsh

== See also ==
- D. W. Griffith filmography
- Lillian Gish filmography
- Lionel Barrymore filmography
