= The Sheriff's Baby =

1913 film

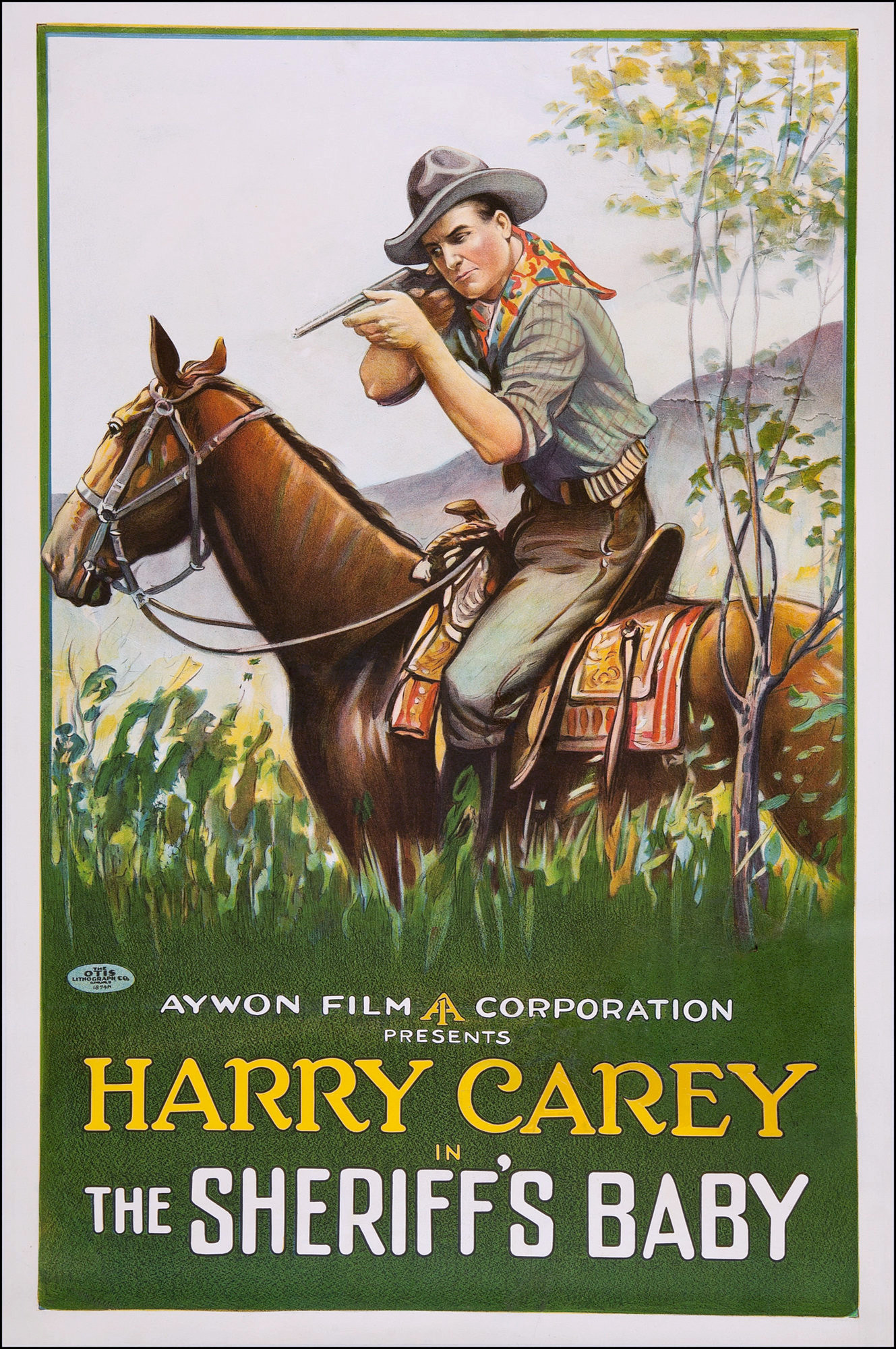
- Theatrical release poster
- Directed by: D. W. Griffith
- Written by: Edward Bell
- Starring: Alfred Paget
- Cinematography: G. W. Bitzer
- Distributed by: General Film Company
- Release date: March 29, 1913
- Running time: 17 minutes (16 frame/s)
- Country: United States
- Language: Silent (English intertitles)

The Sheriff's Baby is a 1913 American silent Western film directed by D. W. Griffith.

== Cast ==
- Alfred Paget as the sheriff
- Henry B. Walthall as first bandit
- Harry Carey as second bandit
- Lionel Barrymore as third bandit
- John T. Dillon as a settler (credited as Jack Dillon)
- Kate Bruce as a settler
- Robert Harron as the deputy
- Dorothy Bernard
- Donald Crisp
- Charles Hill Mailes
- Joseph McDermott

== See also ==
- Harry Carey filmography
- D. W. Griffith filmography
- Lionel Barrymore filmography
