= Christy Cabanne =

American film director, screenwriter and actor (1888–1950)

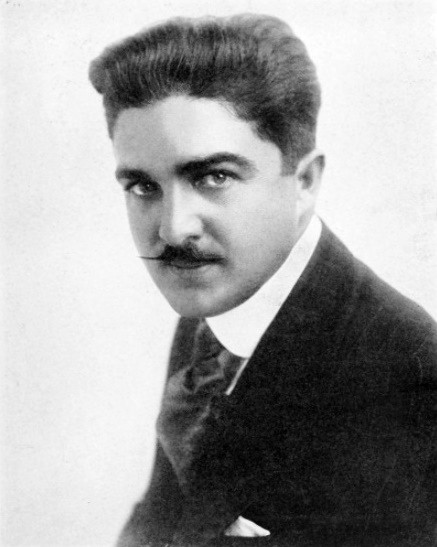
- Cabanne c. 1917
- Born: William Christy Cabanne; April 16, 1888; St. Louis, Missouri
- Died: October 15, 1950 (aged 62); Philadelphia, Pennsylvania
- Years active: 1911–1948
- Spouse(s): Vivien M. Lyle Montrose; Millicent Fisher

The Adopted Brother (1913), directed by D.W. Griffith and Christy Cabanne for Biograph is a western about revenge. Collection EYE Film Institute Netherlands.

William Christy Cabanne (April 16, 1888 – October 15, 1950) was an American film director, screenwriter, and silent film actor.

== Biography ==
Born in 1888 in St. Louis, Missouri, Cabanne (pronounced CAB-a-nay) was educated at the Culver Military Academy and finished his education at the Annapolis Naval Academy. After serving in the U. S. Navy, he started his career on stage in 1908, as an actor and director. He entered the motion picture field in 1910, directing Douglas Fairbanks, and becoming an assistant to pioneer director D. W. Griffith. He appeared on-screen in dozens of short films from 1911 to 1915. He became one of the more prolific directors of his time. Actress Miriam Cooper credited him with discovering her as an extra in 1912.

Cabanne established his own studio, but gave up independent production to accept freelance jobs. For the next three decades he worked for many studios, including Goldwyn, MGM, FBO, Columbia, RKO, Universal, and Monogram. Cabanne directed child actress Shirley Temple in The Red-Haired Alibi (1932), her first credited role in a feature film.

Cabanne earned a reputation for efficiency, capable of making feature films very quickly, often on rugged locations. Like fellow silent-era directors William Beaudine, Elmer Clifton, Harry Fraser, Lambert Hillyer, and Noel M. Smith, Cabanne was resourceful, and he worked for both major and minor studios through the 1930s and 1940s. By the 1940s, Cabanne was usually given low-budget action fare at Universal Pictures, and like Noel Smith he was often assigned to direct the last film in a studio series, finishing the studio's commitment quickly and cheaply. Cabanne ended his career making lower-budget westerns for Monogram Pictures.

== Personal life ==
Christy Cabanne married Vivien M. Lyle Montrose in December 1912, in New York City. They had children, including Virginia Montrose Cabanne, Julia Gooden Cabanne, and Vivien. Cabanne had an affair with actress Millicent Fisher, who had appeared in several of his films (like A Regular Fellow, 1919). After Fisher's child was born, Vivien divorced Cabanne in March 1921. Cabanne then married Fisher.

== Partial filmography ==
- The Battle (1911)
- The Musketeers of Pig Alley (1912)
- For His Son (1912)
- The Transformation of Mike (1912)
- Under Burning Skies (1912)
- The Goddess of Sagebrush Gulch (1912)
- The Punishment (1912)
- Just Like a Woman (1912)
- A Temporary Truce (1912)
- The Inner Circle (1912)
- Two Daughters of Eve (1912)
- So Near, Yet So Far (1912)
- The Painted Lady (1912)
- Heredity (1912)
- The Informer (1912)
- My Hero (1912)
- A Cry for Help (1912)
- The God Within (1912)
- A Chance Deception (1913)
- Near to Earth (1913)
- A Misunderstood Boy (1913)
- The House of Darkness (1913)
- The Wanderer (1913)
- A Timely Interception (1913)
- The Mothering Heart (1913)
- The Sorrowful Shore (1913)
- By Man's Law (1913)
- During the Round-Up (1913)
- An Indian's Loyalty (1913)
- So Runs the Way (1913)
- The Conscience of Hassan Bey (1913)
- The Yaqui Cur (1913)
- Almost a Wild Man (1913)
- The Dishonored Medal (1914)
- Judith of Bethulia (1914) (actor)
- The Hunchback (1914)
- The Quicksands (1914)
- The Rebellion of Kitty Belle (1914)
- The Sisters (1914)
- The Great Leap; Until Death Do Us Part (1914)
- The Life of General Villa (1914)
- The Lost House (1915)
- Martyrs of the Alamo (1915)
- The Outlaw's Revenge (1915)
- Enoch Arden (1915)
- The Absentee (1915)
- The Failure (1915)
- Pathways of Life (1916)
- Daphne and the Pirate (1916)
- Sold for Marriage (1916)
- Diane of the Follies (1916)
- National Red Cross Pageant (1917)
- Draft 258 (1917)
- Miss Robinson Crusoe (1917)
- Cyclone Higgins, D.D. (1918)
- The Mayor of Filbert (1919)
- The Pest (1919)
- The Beloved Cheater (1919)
- Fighting Through (1919)
- God's Outlaw (1919)
- A Regular Fellow (1919)
- Burnt Wings (1920)
- The Triflers (1920)
- The Barricade (1921)
- What's a Wife Worth? (1921)
- Live and Let Live
- At the Stage Door (1921)
- Beyond the Rainbow (1922)
- Till We Meet Again (1922)
- The Spitfire (1924)
- Youth for Sale (1924)
- Is Love Everything? (1924)
- The Average Woman (1924)
- Lend Me Your Husband (1924)
- The Midshipman (1925)
- The Masked Bride (1925)
- Altars of Desire (1927)
- Nameless Men (1928)
- Driftwood (1928)
- Restless Youth (1928)
- The Dawn Trail (1930)
- Sky Raiders (1931)
- Graft (1931)
- Carne de Cabaret (1931)
- The Red-Haired Alibi (1932)
- Western Limited (1932)
- Hearts of Humanity (1932)
- The Unwritten Law (1932)
- Midnight Patrol (1932)
- The World Gone Mad (1933)
- Daring Daughters (1933)
- Jane Eyre (1934)
- A Girl of the Limberlost (1934)
- Money Means Nothing (1934)
- Behind the Green Lights (1935)
- Storm Over the Andes (1935)
- The Keeper of the Bees (1935)
- Another Face (1935)
- It's Up to You (1936)
- The Outcasts of Poker Flat (1937)
- Annapolis Salute (1937)
- The Westland Case (1937)
- Everybody's Doing It (1938)
- Night Spot (1938)
- Smashing the Spy Ring (1938)
- Mutiny on the Blackhawk (1939)
- Legion of Lost Flyers (1939)
- Man from Montreal (1939)
- The Mummy's Hand (1940)
- Black Diamonds (1940)
- Danger on Wheels (1940)
- Hot Steel (1940)
- The Devil's Pipeline (1940)
- Scattergood Baines (1941)
- Timber (1942)
- Drums of the Congo (1942)
- Keep 'Em Slugging (1943)
- Scared to Death (1946, released 1947)
- The Man Who Walked Alone (1945)
- Sensation Hunters (1945)
- Robin Hood of Monterey (1947)
- King of the Bandits (1947)
- Silver Trails (1948)
- Back Trail (1948)
