= A Girl's Stratagem =

1913 film

- Directed by: D. W. Griffith; Frank Powell
- Written by: George Hennessy
- Starring: Mae Marsh
- Cinematography: G. W. Bitzer
- Distributed by: General Film Company
- Release date: March 10, 1913
- Country: United States
- Language: Silent (English intertitles)

A Girl's Stratagem is a 1913 American drama film directed by D. W. Griffith and Frank Powell.

== Cast ==
- Mae Marsh as the young woman
- Charles West as the lead burglar
- Lionel Barrymore
- Kate Bruce as the girl's mother
- Harry Carey as the girl's sweetheart
- Dell Henderson as a loafer
- W. Chrystie Miller as the girl's father
- Alfred Paget as the saloon keeper

== See also ==
- Harry Carey filmography
- D. W. Griffith filmography
- Lionel Barrymore filmography
