= The Great Leap; Until Death Do Us Part =

1914 silent film directed by Christy Cabanne

- Directed by: Christy Cabanne
- Produced by: D. W. Griffith
- Starring: Mae Marsh; Robert Harron; Ralph Lewis
- Production company: Reliance Motion Picture Co.
- Distributed by: Mutual Film Corp. Continental Feature Film Corp.
- Release date: March 26, 1914 (US)
- Running time: 4 reels
- Country: United States
- Language: English

The Great Leap; Until Death Do Us Part is a 1914 silent American drama film, directed by Christy Cabanne. It stars Mae Marsh, Robert Harron, and Ralph Lewis, and was released on March 26, 1914.

== Cast ==
- Mae Marsh as Mary Gibbs
- Robert Harron as Bobby Dawson
- Ralph Lewis
- Eagle Eye
- Donald Crisp
- Raoul Walsh

== Production ==
The film opened on March 26, 1914 at Woodley's Theater in Los Angeles, California. In addition to Christy Cabanne and D. W. Griffith, the premiere was also attended by Mae Marsh, Robert Harron, Ralph Lewis, Donald Crisp, and Raoul Walsh.
