= The Transformation of Mike =

1912 film by D. W. Griffith

- Directed by: D. W. Griffith
- Written by: Wilfred Lucas
- Starring: Blanche Sweet; Wilfred Lucas
- Cinematography: G. W. Bitzer
- Distributed by: Biograph Company
- Release date: February 1, 1912
- Running time: 17 minutes
- Country: United States
- Language: Silent (English intertitles)

The Transformation of Mike is a 1912 American short silent drama film directed by D. W. Griffith and starring Blanche Sweet.

== Cast ==
- Wilfred Lucas as Mike
- Blanche Sweet as The Tenement Girl
- Edna Foster as The Tenement Girl's Brother
- William J. Butler as The Tenement Father
- Kate Bruce as A Neighbor
- W. Christy Cabanne as In Bar
- John T. Dillon as A Policeman / At Dance
- Frank Evans as A Policeman
- Robert Harron as At Dance
- Grace Henderson as At Dance
- J. Jiquel Lanoe as In Bar / At Dance
- Joseph McDermott as In Bar / At Dance
- Gus Pixley as At Dance
- W. C. Robinson as In Bar / At Dance

== See also ==
- List of American films of 1912
- D. W. Griffith filmography
- Blanche Sweet filmography
