= The Tender Hearted Boy =

1913 American silent drama film

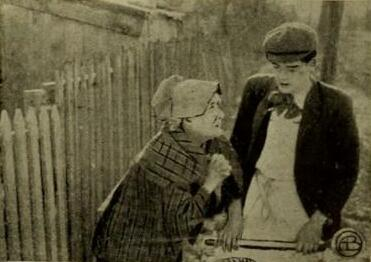
- Promotional still
- Directed by: D. W. Griffith
- Written by: Lionel Barrymore
- Starring: Robert Harron; Kate Bruce; Mae Marsh
- Cinematography: G. W. Bitzer
- Production company: Biograph Company
- Distributed by: General Film Company
- Release date: January 23, 1913 (U.S.)
- Running time: 10 minutes
- Country: United States
- Language: Silent (English intertitles)

The Tender Hearted Boy is a 1913 American silent drama short film directed by D. W. Griffith, written by Lionel Barrymore and starring Robert Harron, Kate Bruce and Mae Marsh.

== Cast ==
- Robert Harron as The Tender-Hearted Boy
- Kate Bruce as The Tender-Hearted Boy's mother
- Mae Marsh as The Tender-Hearted Boy's Sweetheart
- W. Chrystie Miller as The Sweetheart's Father
- John T. Dillon as The Butcher
- Gertrude Norman as The Miser
- Lionel Barrymore as Undetermined Secondary Role
- Clara T. Bracy as Old Woman
- Walter P. Lewis as Rent Collector
- Alfred Paget as Policeman
- W. C. Robinson as Man on Street
- J. Waltham as Policeman
