= Joseph McDermott (actor) =

American actor

- Born: December 1878; Dubuque, Iowa, US
- Died: March 6, 1923 (aged 44); Los Angeles, California, US
- Years active: 1912–1923

Joseph McDermott (December 1878 – March 6, 1923), was an American actor of the silent era. He appeared in 76 films between 1912 and 1923. He died in Los Angeles, California by committing suicide.

== Selected filmography ==
- The Forbidden Trail (1923)
- Perils of the Yukon (1922)
- Barb Wire (1922)
- Brute Force (1914)
- The Battle at Elderbush Gulch (1913)
- All for Science (1913)
- The Detective's Stratagem (1913)
- The Stopped Clock (1913)
- So Runs the Way (1913)
- A Woman in the Ultimate (1913)
- The Mothering Heart (1913)
- Red Hicks Defies the World (1913)
- A Timely Interception (1913)
- Just Gold (1913)
- The Wanderer (1913)
- The House of Darkness (1913)
- The Lady and the Mouse (1913)
- A Misunderstood Boy (1913)
- The Left-Handed Man (1913)
- The Sheriff's Baby (1913)
- A Welcome Intruder (1913)
- Fate (1913)
- Near to Earth (1913)
- Broken Ways (1913)
- Love in an Apartment Hotel (1913)
- A Chance Deception (1913)
- Oil and Water (1913)
- A Misappropriated Turkey (1913)
- An Adventure in the Autumn Woods (1913)
- Pirate Gold (1913)
- The Telephone Girl and the Lady (1913)
- Three Friends (1913)
- The Yaqui Cur (1913)
- My Baby (1912)
- The Chief's Blanket (1912)
- Blind Love (1912)
- A Change of Spirit (1912)
- The Inner Circle (1912)
- The Transformation of Mike (1912)
- The Old Bookkeeper (1912)
