= Coincidence (1921 film) =

1921 film

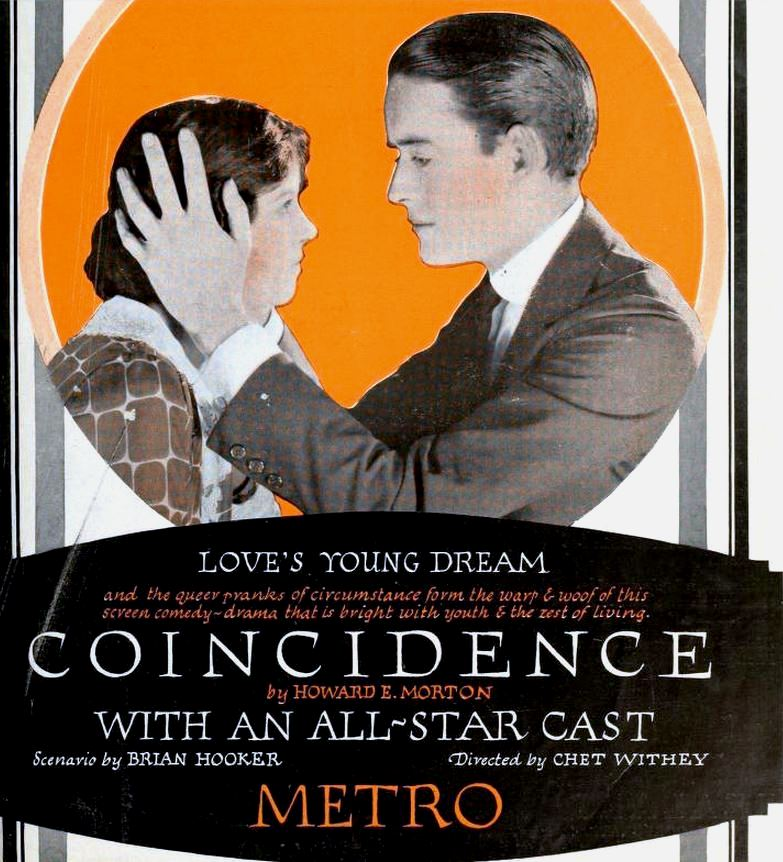
- Ad for film
- Directed by: Chester Withey
- Written by: Brian Hooker
- Story by: Howard E. Morton
- Starring: Robert Harron; June Walker
- Edited by: Louis C. Bitzer
- Distributed by: Metro Pictures Corporation
- Release date: May 13, 1921
- Country: United States
- Languages: Silent; English intertitles

Coincidence is a 1921 American silent comedy film starring Robert Harron and June Walker. It was Harron's first starring role after signing a deal with Metro Pictures Corporation, as well as his last film; Harron died of a self-inflicted gunshot wound in September 1920 between completion of filming and the release. It was directed by Chester "Chet" Withey and written by Brian Hooker based on a story by Howard E. Morton. The cinematographer was Louis C. Bitzer.

According to film historian Anthony Slide, "With Robert Harron's death, the film industry for the first time had to deal with the release of a film whose star had just died under mysterious circumstances." The film was released in 1921, the year following Harron's death. Instead of promoting Coincidence as Harron's final film, Metro chose not to associate it with Harron's death and had a "low key" release.

== Plot ==
Billy Jenks (Harron) leaves his small town to find success in New York City, but he settles for a department store cashier job. He gets in a heated romance with secretary and aspiring pianist Phoebe Howard (Walker). Their romance leads to both of them being fired, and Billy is later arrested for burglary. Billy tries to borrow money from his wealthy aunt, who has died without his knowledge. Also without his knowledge, she left him $100,000, and her estate lawyers manage to find Billy through a coincidence. The money is then stolen by a con man who also tries to woo Phoebe, but Billy gets both back through a series of coincidences. He and Phoebe then get married.

== Cast ==
- Bradley Barker as "Handsome Harry" Brent
- Frank Belcher as John Carter
- William Frederic as Stephen Fiske
- Robert Harron as Billy Jenks
- June Ellen Terry as Dorothy Carter
- June Walker as Phoebe Howard

== Production notes ==
Coincidence began shooting in Mamaroneck, New York in July 1920. The film is now lost. No prints are known to survive.
