= The Battle (1911 film) =

1911 film directed by D. W. Griffith

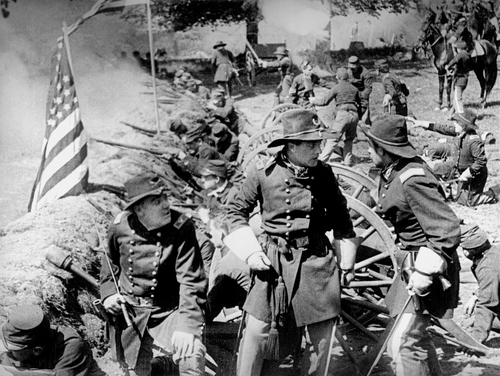
- Film still
- Directed by: D. W. Griffith
- Starring: Charles West; Blanche Sweet; Behzat Butak; İsmail Galip Arcan
- Cinematography: G. W. Bitzer
- Distributed by: Biograph Company
- Release date: November 6, 1911
- Running time: 19 minutes (16 frame/s)
- Country: United States
- Language: Silent (English intertitles)

The Battle is a 1911 American silent war film directed by D. W. Griffith. The film was set during the American Civil War. It was shot in Fort Lee, New Jersey, where many early film studios in America's first motion picture industry were based at the beginning of the 20th century.

Prints of the film survive in several film archives around the world including the Museum of Modern Art, UCLA Film and Television Archive, George Eastman House, and the Filmoteca Española.

== Plot ==
In 1861, Union soldiers enjoy a party. One officer and his sweetheart go outside to have a moment alone. However, he has to join his unit as it marches away to the cheers of civilians.

She is ordered to leave her home as a fierce battle erupts very close by, but she refuses to go. Her beau turns out to be a coward. He hides in her house. She first laughs at him, then strikes him with her fists, and finally begs him to return to the fighting, but he instead flees out a window. The Union commanding general is wounded and brought inside. During a lull in the fighting, the coward rejoins his unit without anyone noticing his absence in the fighting. He is ordered on a mission, but instead hides from some Confederates, who shoot the soldier accompanying him. The Union forces are driven back. As the coward runs away, he encounters another Union force. He pleads with its commander for reinforcements, but all the commander can spare is ammunition in two "powder-wagons". As it turns out, the Union soldiers are running out of ammunition. The Confederates set bonfires in the path of the powder-wagons, and one is blown up. The drivers of the second are shot, but the coward regains his courage and drives the wagon by himself. He brings the desperately needed ammunition to the Union force, which is then able to first repel the Rebel attack, then rout the enemy and achieve victory. Inside the house, he is thanked by the commander, and he and his sweetheart embrace.

== Cast ==
- Charles West as The boy (credited as Charles H. West)
- Blanche Sweet as His sweetheart
- Robert Harron as A Union soldier
- Charles Hill Mailes as The commander
- Donald Crisp as A Union soldier
- Spottiswoode Aitken
- Edwin August as A Union officer
- Lionel Barrymore as Wagon Driver
- Kate Bruce as In the town
- William J. Butler as A Union officer / At Farewell
- W. Christy Cabanne as A Union soldier
- Edna Foster as At dance
- Joseph Graybill as A Union officer
- Guy Hedlund as A Union soldier
- Dell Henderson as A Union officer
- Harry Hyde as A Union soldier
- J. Jiquel Lanoe as A Union officer
- W. Chrystie Miller as At dance
- Alfred Paget as Confederate officer
- W. C. Robinson as A Union soldier
- Kate Toncray as At dance / At farewell
