= June Walker =

American actress

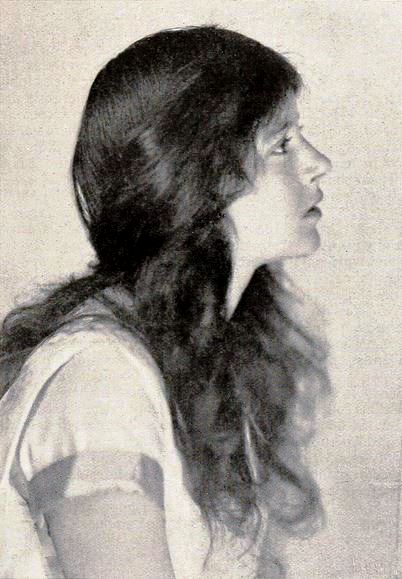
- Painting of Walker in 1920
- Born: June 14, 1900; New York City, U.S.
- Died: February 3, 1966 (aged 65); Los Angeles, California, U.S.
- Occupations: Stage, film, television actress
- Spouse: Geoffrey Kerr
- Children: John Kerr

June Walker (June 14, 1900 – February 3, 1966) was an American stage and film actress.

== Early years ==
Walker was born in New York City on June 14, 1900, and she was orphaned when she was age 14. She worked as a millinery clerk before becoming an actress.

== Stage career ==
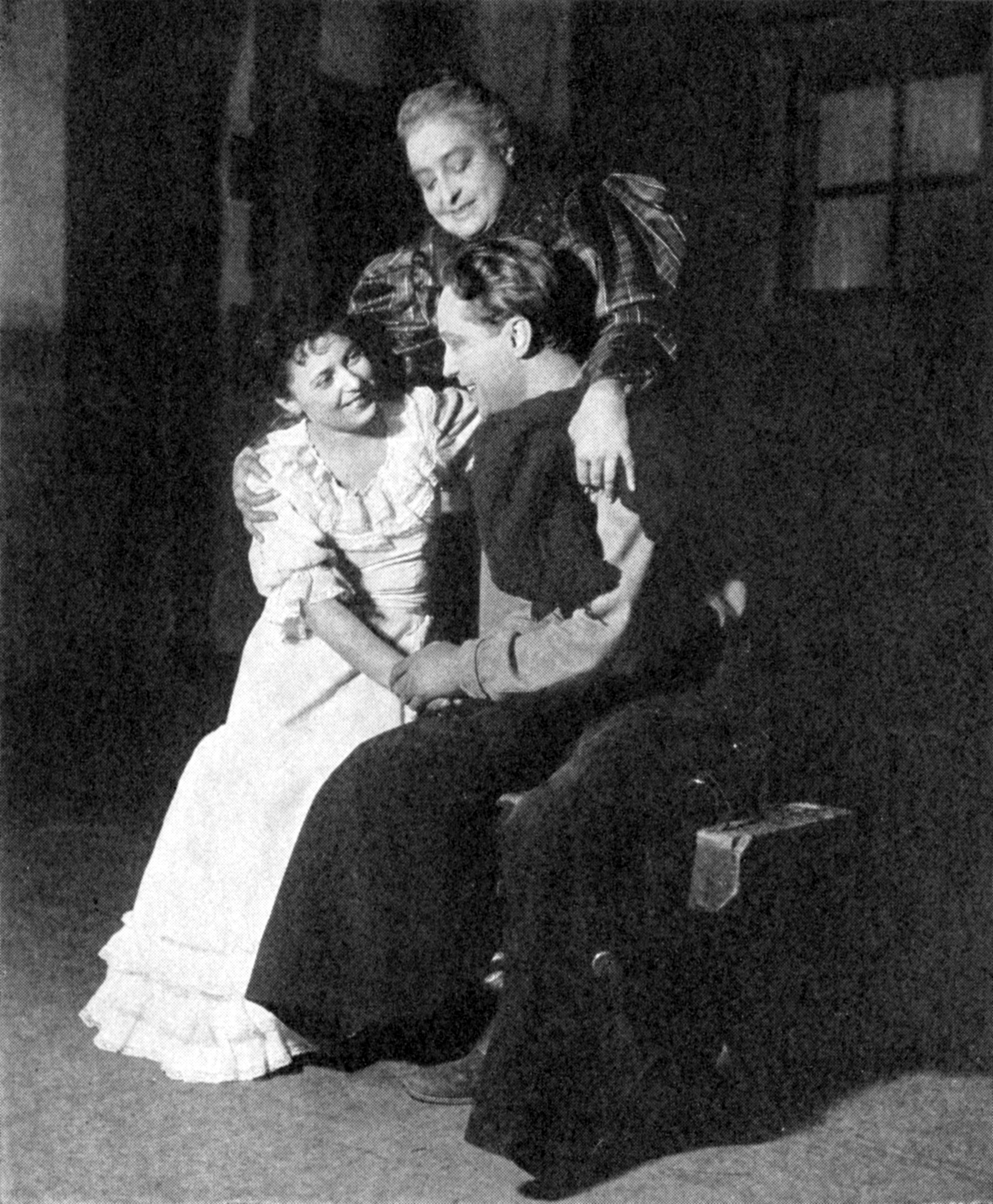
Walker (left) with fellow performers Helen Westley and Franchot Tone in the 1931 Broadway production Green Grow the Lilacs

Walker performed as a member of the chorus of a Globe Theater production of Hitchy-Koo when she was age 16.

She appeared on Broadway in such plays as Green Grow the Lilacs, The Farmer Takes a Wife, and Twelfth Night. She was the first actress to portray the character of Lorelei Lee in the 1926 Broadway production of Gentlemen Prefer Blondes. Her obituary in The New York Times stated the role "was as much her creation as that of Anita Loos who wrote the book that became the comedy." The success of the play launched Walker's career, and she had additional Broadway successes. She played Linda Loman to Thomas Mitchell's Willy in the 1949 touring company of Death of a Salesman, and she toured, performing in the role of Vinnie, in Life with Father.

For four weeks in 1924, Walker appeared as the leading lady in the summer stock cast at Elitch Theatre. She appeared in:The Changelings by Lee Wilson Dood, Rolling Home by John Hunter Booth, The New Poor by Cosmo Hamilton, and Across the Street by Richard A. Purdy.

== Film career ==
Walker acted in silent films for Essanay Studios and in sound films, including A Child Is Waiting, Through Different Eyes, The Unforgiven, and War Nurse.

== Personal life ==
In 1926, she married British actor Geoffrey Kerr. The couple divorced in 1943; their son was actor John Kerr. She appeared with her son in a 1954 episode of NBC's Justice. It was his first performance.

== Death ==
On February 3, 1966, aged 65, Walker died of undisclosed causes at her son's home in Los Angeles. She was interred in the Westwood Village Memorial Park Cemetery in Los Angeles.

== Filmography ==
Year	Title	Role	Notes
1921	Coincidence	Phoebe Howard	Lost film
1930	War Nurse	Babs	
1942	Thru Different Eyes	Margie	
1960	The Unforgiven	Hagar Rawlins	
1961	The Tom Ewell Show	Madge	Season 1 Episode 20: "Storm Over Shangri-La"
1961	Whispering Smith	Ma Gates	Season 1 Episode 2: "The Grudge"
1961	My Three Sons	Annie	Season 2 Episode 10: "Mike in Charge"
1961	Thriller	Dierdre Pennaroyd	Season 2 Episode 9: "A Third for Pinochle"
1961	Alfred Hitchcock Presents	Mrs. Millie Wright	Season 7 Episode 12: "A Jury of Her Peers"
1963	A Child Is Waiting	Mrs. McDonald	Uncredited
1963	The Alfred Hitchcock Hour	Mrs. Wales	Season 1 Episode 20: "The Paragon"
1964	The Alfred Hitchcock Hour	Aunt Mary Jane	Season 3 Episode 1: "The Return of Verge Likens"
