= A Misunderstood Boy =

1913 film

- Directed by: D. W. Griffith
- Written by: Christy Cabanne
- Starring: Lionel Barrymore
- Cinematography: G. W. Bitzer
- Distributed by: General Film Company
- Release date: April 19, 1913 (U.S.)
- Running time: 17 minutes (16 frame/s)
- Country: United States
- Language: Silent (English intertitles)

A Misunderstood Boy is a 1913 American short drama film directed by D. W. Griffith.

== Cast ==
- Lionel Barrymore as The Father
- Kate Bruce as The Mother
- Lillian Gish as The Daughter
- Robert Harron as The Son
- Alfred Paget as the vigilante leader
- Charles Hill Mailes as a thieving merchant
- Viola Barry as a thieving merchant
- Christy Cabanne as on street
- William A. Carroll as vigilante
- Joseph McDermott as vigilante
- Antonio Moreno as vigilante
- Frank Opperman as in next town
- W.C. Robinson as vigilante

== See also ==
- D. W. Griffith filmography
- Lillian Gish filmography
- Lionel Barrymore filmography
