= The Painted Lady =

1912 film

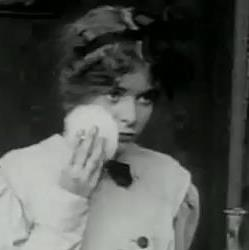
- Blanche Sweet in the film
- Directed by: D. W. Griffith
- Written by: D. W. Griffith
- Starring: Blanche Sweet
- Cinematography: G. W. Bitzer
- Distributed by: Biograph Company
- Release date: October 24, 1912
- Running time: 12 minutes (18 frame/s)
- Country: United States
- Language: Silent (English intertitles)

The Painted Lady is a 1912 American short drama film directed by D. W. Griffith and starring Blanche Sweet. A print of the film survives.

== Plot ==
A woman is his father's favorite because she follows his precepts. However, the younger daughter does not, and the elder daughter is appalled when she finds her sibling applying makeup. At a church festival, the younger daughter is popular with the young men, but the elder sibling is ignored, bringing her to the edge of tears. The minister introduces her to a young man, a stranger who has gained his trust. The man appears to find her attractive. Her father, however, disapproves of the man and sends him away.

The woman sneaks out of the house to see the man. Trustingly, she tells him about her father's business affairs. Later, the man, wearing a coat and hat with a scarf or bandana covering his face, breaks into the house. She spots him. She fetches a pistol and confronts the burglar. He attempts to grab the weapon, but is shot dead in the ensuing struggle.

The woman is so devastated when she discovers the robber's identity that her mind gives way. Later, she returns to the place where she first met him, and proceeds to have a conversation with the imaginary man. She is brought home by a nurse assigned to watch over her. Back home, she applies makeup to her face and returns to the spot once again. She again speaks to the dead man, then is ashamed when she sees herself in a mirror. Just as her father rushes to her side, she collapses, apparently dead.

== Cast ==
- Blanche Sweet as The Older Sister
- Madge Kirby as The Younger Sister
- Charles Hill Mailes as Their Father
- Kate Bruce as Their Mother
- Joseph Graybill as The Stranger
- William J. Butler as The Minister
- Lionel Barrymore at Ice Cream Festival
- Elmer Booth at Ice Cream Festival
- W. Christy Cabanne at Ice Cream Festival
- Harry Carey at Ice Cream Festival
- Josephine Crowell
- Gladys Egan as Little Girl In Arbor
- Dorothy Gish as Belle At Ice Cream Festival
- Lillian Gish as Belle At Ice Cream Festival
- Charles Gorman as Hired Hand
- Robert Harron as Beau At Ice Cream Festival
- W. E. Lawrence as Boy With Dog
- Walter P. Lewis at Ice Cream Festival
- Walter Long
- Walter Miller at Ice Cream Festival
- Jack Pickford as Beau at Ice Cream Festival
- Henry B. Walthall at Ice Cream Festival

== See also ==
- Harry Carey filmography
- D. W. Griffith filmography
- Lillian Gish filmography
- Blanche Sweet filmography
- Lionel Barrymore filmography
