= So Runs the Way =

1913 film

- Directed by: Christy Cabanne
- Written by: Christy Cabanne
- Starring: Reggie Morris; Lillian Gish
- Distributed by: General Film Company
- Release date: October 11, 1913
- Running time: 10 minutes
- Country: United States
- Language: Silent with English intertitles

So Runs the Way is a 1913 American short drama film, directed by Christy Cabanne.

== Cast ==
- Reggie Morris as Frederick A.Paulson
- Lillian Gish as The Young Woman
- Lionel Barrymore as Undetermined Role (unconfirmed)
- Joseph McDermott as The Detective
- Owen Moore as Undetermined Role (unconfirmed)
- Frances Nelson as Undetermined Role
- W.C. Robinson as The Butler
- Kate Toncray as At Party
