= A Woman in the Ultimate =

1913 film

- Directed by: Dell Henderson
- Written by: William E. Wing
- Produced by: Biograph Company
- Starring: Lillian Gish
- Distributed by: General Film Company
- Release date: September 4, 1913
- Running time: 10 minutes
- Country: United States
- Language: Silent with English intertitles

A Woman in the Ultimate is a 1913 American short drama film starring Lillian Gish and Henry Walthall, directed by Dell Henderson.

== Cast ==
- Lillian Gish as Verda
- Charles Hill Mailes as Verda's stepfather
- Henry B. Walthall as member of the Badger Gang
- Alfred Paget as member of the Badger Gang
- John T. Dillon as member of the Badger Gang
- Joseph McDermott as member of the Badger Gang

== See also ==
- Lillian Gish filmography
