= The Stopped Clock =

1913 American drama film

- Directed by: Anthony O'Sullivan
- Written by: Frank E. Woods
- Starring: Claire McDowell, Charles West and James Cooley
- Release date: November 1, 1913
- Country: United States
- Language: Silent with English intertitles

The Stopped Clock is a 1913 American drama film featuring Harry Carey.

== Cast ==
- Claire McDowell as The Antique Dealer's Daughter
- Charles West as The Senior Clerk (credited as Charles H. West)
- Reggie Morris as The Junior Clerk
- Kate Bruce as The Mother
- Hector Dion as The Doctor
- Harry Carey as The Detective
- Frank Evans as First Policeman
- Joseph McDermott as Second Policeman
- W. Chrystie Miller as Extra
- James Cooley as The Junior Clerk

== See also ==
- Harry Carey filmography
