= Flora Foster =

American actress (1898–1914)

- Born: March 4, 1898; Boston, Massachusetts, USA
- Died: September 21, 1914 (aged 16); Chicago, Illinois
- Occupation: Actress
- Years active: 1911–1914
- Relatives: Edna Foster (sister)

Flora Foster (March 4, 1898 – September 21, 1914) was an American actress known for her roles in films during the silent film era.

== Biography ==
Flora Foster was born in Boston to Anne Louise Ramsell Foster and Conrad Houteling Foster. Conrad Foster was a theater owner in Chicago and eventual mayor of Traverse City, Michigan.

She worked with the Biograph Company and the Thanhouser Company. She had roles in at least several films; she played young David in David Copperfield (1911).

Her sister, Edna Foster, was also a child actress. They both worked in vaudeville. Foster attended boarding school in New York near Biograph's studios while their father remained in Chicago.

Foster's favorite stage actress was Maude Adams. She and her sister both enjoyed working with D.W. Griffith and Harry Carey. She had grey eyes and blonde hair.

Foster died of heart failure in Chicago on September 21, 1914.

== Selected filmography ==
- David Copperfield (1911)
- Prince Charming (1912)
- The District Attorney's Conscience (1912)
- The Wedding Gown (1913)
