= A Misappropriated Turkey =

1913 American silent drama film

- Directed by: D. W. Griffith
- Written by: Edward Acker
- Starring: Charles West; Claire McDowell; Edna Foster
- Cinematography: G. W. Bitzer
- Production company: Biograph Company
- Release date: January 27, 1913 (U.S.)
- Running time: 17 minutes
- Country: United States
- Language: Silent (English intertitles)

A Misappropriated Turkey is a 1913 American silent drama film directed by D. W. Griffith.

== Cast ==
- Charles West as The Striker
- Claire McDowell as Mrs. Fallon
- Edna Foster as The Striker's Son
- Harry Carey as The Bartender
- John T. Dillon as Union Member
- Frank Evans as Union Member
- Robert Harron as Union Member
- Walter P. Lewis as Union Member
- Charles Hill Mailes as Union Member
- Joseph McDermott as Union Member / In Bar
- W. Chrystie Miller as Union Member
- Jack Pickford as On Street

== See also ==
- Harry Carey filmography
- D. W. Griffith filmography
