= The Battle at Elderbush Gulch =

1913 film directed by D. W. Griffith

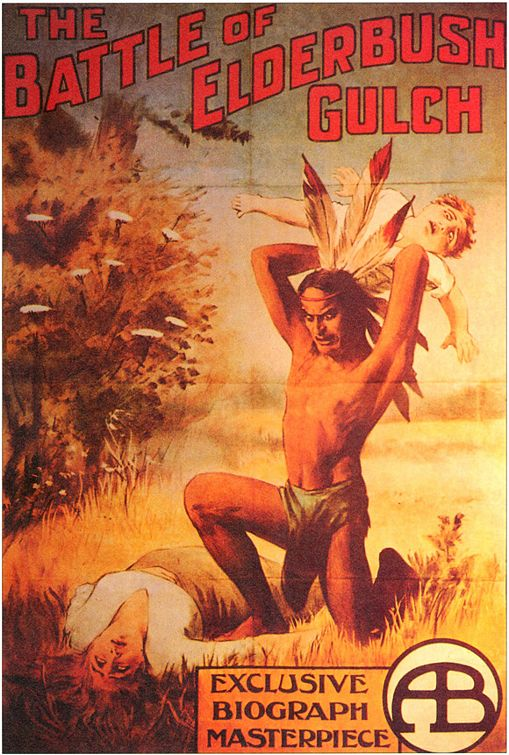
- Theatrical release poster
- Directed by: D. W. Griffith
- Written by: D. W. Griffith; Henry Albert Phillips
- Starring: Mae Marsh; Lillian Gish
- Cinematography: G. W. Bitzer
- Distributed by: General Film Company
- Release date: November 1913 (U.S.)
- Running time: 29 minutes
- Country: United States
- Language: Silent (English intertitles)

Full film

The Battle at Elderbush Gulch (also known as The Battle of Elderbush Gulch) is a 1913 American silent Western film directed by D. W. Griffith and featuring Mae Marsh, Lillian Gish, and Alfred Paget.

== Plot ==
Orphans Sally (Mae Marsh) and her little sister are sent to live with their uncle in the west. Among other baggage, they bring their two puppies. Melissa (Lillian Gish) is in the same stagecoach with husband and newborn baby. The uncles find the little girls amusing but tell them that the dogs must stay outside. Meanwhile, a nearby tribe of Native Americans is having a tribal dance. The puppies, left outside in a basket, run off. Sally, worried about the dogs, goes outside and discovers they are gone. She follows their trail and runs into the tribal chief and his son who have captured them for food. There is a scuffle but her uncles arrive and intervene. Gunfire ensues and one of the Native Americans is left dead. The other returns to the tribe to inform them and aroused by "hatred to revenge" they go into a war dance.

Meanwhile, a tearful Sally has persuaded a friendly hand to build a secret door in the cabin so she can bring the puppies inside at night. The Native Americans attack the village and the frightened settlers run off toward the lonely cabin. In the melee, the baby is separated from its father. The Natives attack the cabin just after a scout rides off to alert the fort.

The Native Americans ride in circles around the cabin while the settlers try to fight them off. Melissa, in the cabin, is distraught worrying about the fate of her baby. Sally, seeing the baby through a peephole, sneaks out her secret door and finds the baby in the arms of a dead towns person. In a hectic battle scene, she brings the baby back through the secret door.

The settlers are running out of ammunition and the people in the cabin are in chaos. The Native Americans, crawling on their stomachs, almost reach the cabin, but then the cavalry arrives. The Native Americans are quickly dispatched and all is well but for Melissa's grief over her missing baby. Sally pops out of a chest holding baby and puppies. The uncle agrees to let Sally keep the puppies inside.

== Cast ==
Scene from The Battle at Elderbush Gulch

- Mae Marsh as Sally
- Leslie Loveridge as the waif
- Alfred Paget as waifs' uncle
- Robert Harron as the father
- Lillian Gish as Melissa Harlow
- Charles Hill Mailes as ranch owner
- William A. Carroll as the Mexican
- Frank Opperman as Indian chief
- Henry B. Walthall as Indian chief's son
- Joseph McDermott as waifs' guardian
- Jennie Lee as waifs' guardian
- Lionel Barrymore
- Elmer Booth
- Kate Bruce as settler
- Harry Carey
- Charles Gorman as among the Indians
- Dell Henderson
- Elmo Lincoln as cavalryman
- W. Chrystie Miller as settler
- W. C. Robinson as among the Indians
- Blanche Sweet

== Criticism ==
The movie has been noted for its pitting of white settlers vs. indigenous people, in particular an overarching concern for the safety of the white women and a baby during the gun battle. Major focus remains, however, on the prolonged shootout. Far from a nuanced presentation, The Battle at Elderbush Gulch dramatizes the settlers and the indigenous in many stereotypical ways—simple, misunderstood, untrusting, quick-tempered, violent, vengeful—that fit the fanciful perceptions of the American West at the time the film was made.
