= A Country Cupid =

1911 film directed by D. W. Griffith

- Directed by: D. W. Griffith
- Starring: Blanche Sweet
- Cinematography: G. W. Bitzer
- Release date: July 24, 1911
- Running time: 18 minutes
- Country: United States
- Language: Silent (English intertitles)

A Country Cupid is a 1911 American short silent drama film directed by D. W. Griffith and starring Blanche Sweet. A print of the film survives.

== Cast ==
- Blanche Sweet as Edith
- Edwin August as Jack
- Edna Foster as Billy
- Joseph Graybill as The Half-Wit
- Kate Bruce as Edith's Mother
- Claire McDowell as The Half-Wit's Mother
- Frank Evans as Jack's Father
- Alfred Paget as A Farmer
- Edward Dillon as Among Students
- Robert Harron as Among Students

== See also ==
- List of American films of 1911
- D. W. Griffith filmography
- Blanche Sweet filmography
