= The Outlaw's Revenge =

1915 silent film directed by Christy Cabanne

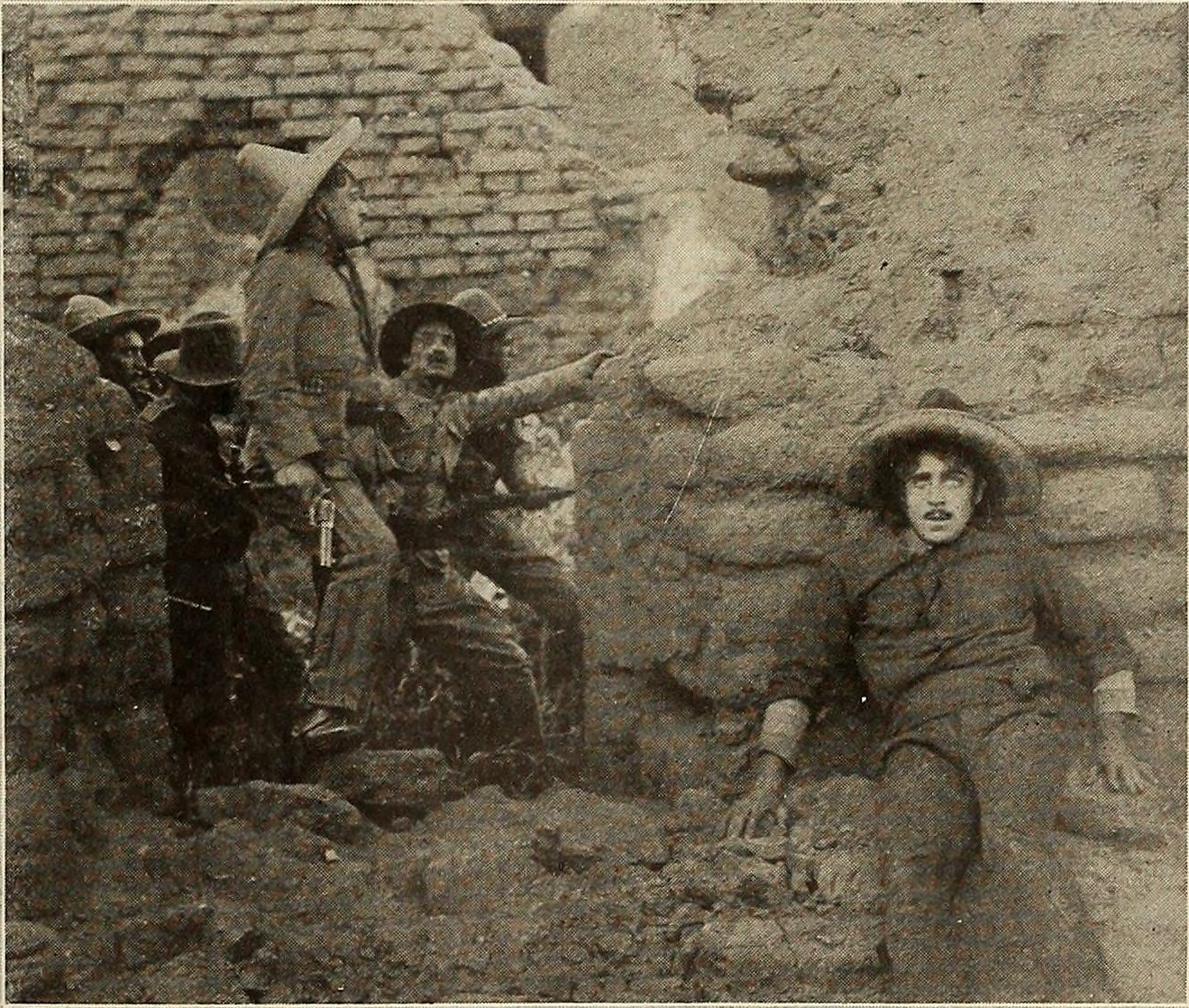
- Raoul Walsh in a publicity still
- Directed by: Christy Cabanne
- Starring: Raoul Walsh; Irene Hunt; Teddy Sampson
- Cinematography: Marcel Le Picard
- Production company: Reliance Motion Picture Company
- Distributed by: Mutual Film Corp.
- Release date: April 15, 1915
- Running time: 4 reels
- Country: United States
- Language: Silent (English intertitles)

The Outlaw's Revenge is a 1915 American silent biographical drama film, directed by Christy Cabanne. It stars Raoul Walsh, Irene Hunt, and Teddy Sampson, and was released on April 15, 1915.

== Cast ==
- Raoul Walsh as the outlaw
- Irene Hunt as the outlaw's elder sister
- Teddy Sampson as the outlaw's younger sister
- Mae Marsh an American lover
- Robert Harron an American lover
- Eagle Eye as the outlaw's servant
- Walter Long as federal officer
- William E. "Babe" Lawrence as federal officer
- Spottiswoode Aitken as federal officer
