= The Rebellion of Kitty Belle =

1914 film

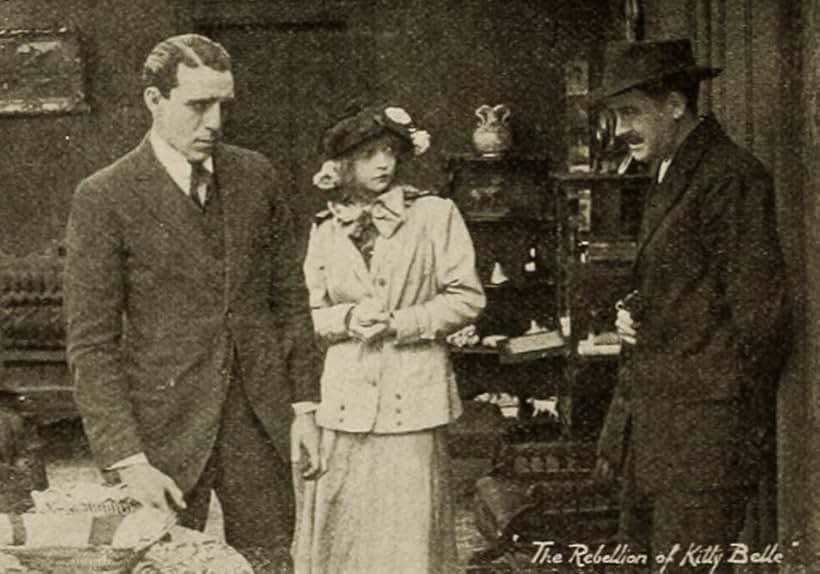
- Directed by: Christy Cabanne
- Written by: George Pattullo
- Starring: Lillian Gish
- Release date: June 14, 1914
- Running time: 20 minutes
- Country: United States
- Language: Silent with English intertitles

The Rebellion of Kitty Belle is a 1914 American short drama film directed by Christy Cabanne and starring Lillian Gish.

== Cast ==
- Lillian Gish
- Dorothy Gish
- Robert Harron
- Kate Bruce
- Joseph Carle
- Alfred Paget
- Raoul Walsh (as Raoul A. Walsh)
