= Hearts of the World =

1918 film by D. W. Griffith

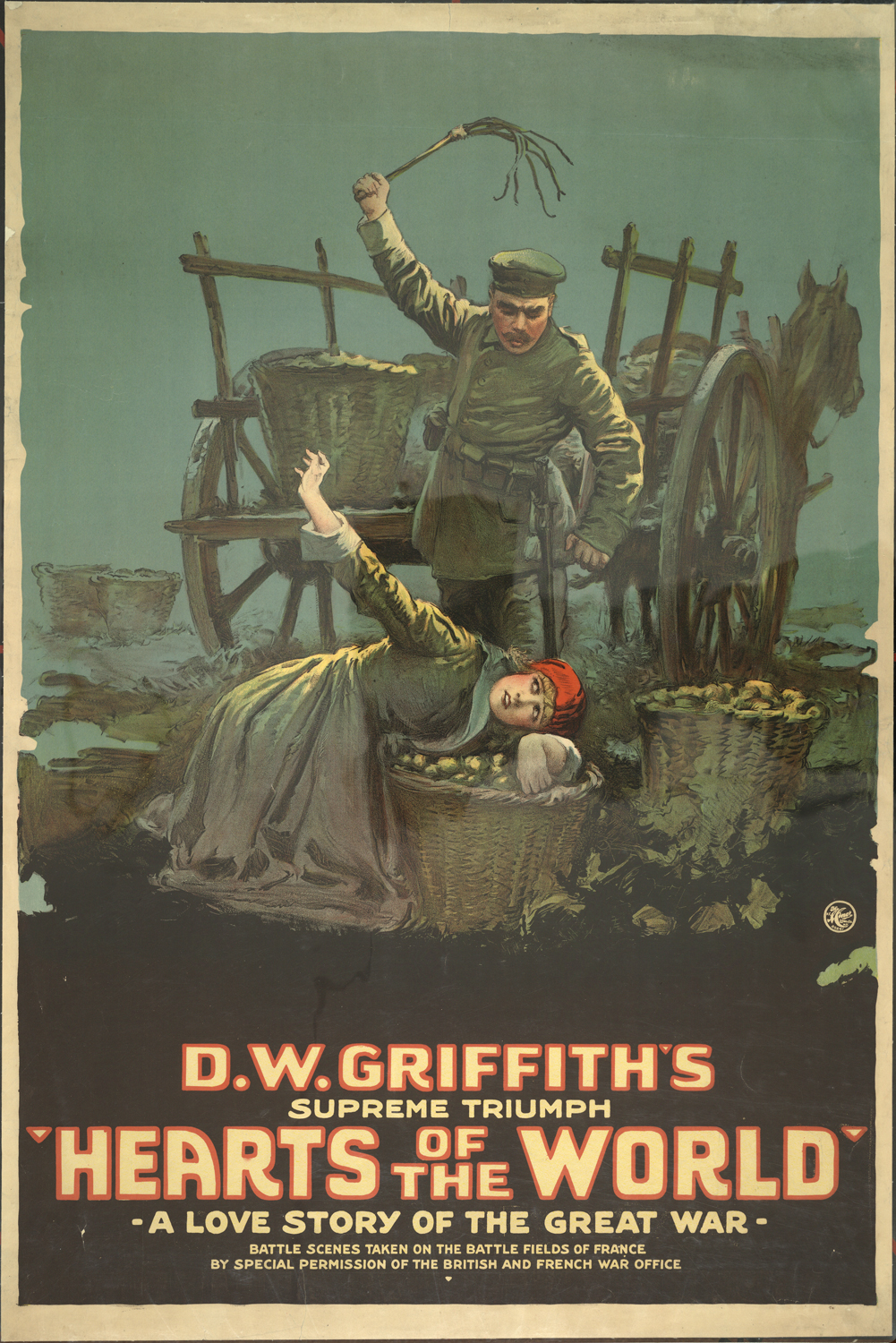
- Lobby poster
- Directed by: D. W. Griffith
- Written by: D. W. Griffith (credited as Capt. Victor Marier and M. Gaston de Tolignac)
- Produced by: D. W. Griffith
- Starring: Lillian Gish; Dorothy Gish; Ben Alexander; Robert Harron
- Cinematography: Billy Bitzer; Alfred Machin; Hendrik Sartov
- Edited by: James Smith; Rose Smith
- Distributed by: Paramount Pictures
- Release date: March 12, 1918 (U.S.)
- Running time: 117 minutes
- Country: United States
- Language: Silent (English intertitles)
- Budget: $425,000
- Box office: $1.5 million

Hearts of the World

Hearts of the World (also known as Love's Struggle) is a 1918 American silent melodrama and World War I propaganda film written, produced and directed by D. W. Griffith. In an effort to change the American public's neutral stance regarding the war, the British government contacted Griffith due to his stature and reputation for dramatic filmmaking.

Hearts of the World stars Lillian and Dorothy Gish and Robert Harron. The film was produced by D.W. Griffith Productions, Famous Players–Lasky Corporation, and the War Office Committee was distributed by Paramount Pictures under the Artcraft Pictures Corporation banner.

== Plot ==
Two families live next to one another in a French village on the eve of World War I. The Boy in one of the families falls for the only daughter in the other family. As they make preparations for marriage, World War I breaks out, and, although the Boy is American, he feels he should fight for the country in which he lives.

When the French retreat, the village is shelled. The Boy's father and the Girl's mother and grandfather are killed. The Girl, deranged, wanders aimlessly through the battlefield and comes upon the Boy badly wounded and unconscious. She finds her way back to the village where she is nursed back to health by The Little Disturber who had previously been a rival for the Boy's affections. The Boy is carried off by the Red Cross. Von Strohm, a German officer, lusts after the Girl and attempts to rape her, but she narrowly escapes when he is called away by his commanding officer.

Upon his recovery, the Boy, disguised as a German officer, infiltrates the enemy-occupied village and finds the Girl. The two of them are forced to kill a German sergeant who discovers them. Von Strohm finds the dead sergeant and locates the Boy and Girl who are locked in an upper room at the inn. It is a race against time with the Germans trying to break down the door as the French return to retake the village.

== Cast ==
- Lillian Gish as the girl (Marie Stephenson)
- Josephine Crowell as the girl's mother
- Robert Harron as the boy (Douglas Gordon Hamilton)
- Kate Bruce as the boy's mother
- Dorothy Gish as the little disturber
- Ben Alexander as the boy's littlest brother
- Noël Coward as the man with the wheelbarrow/a villager in the streets
- Sir Edward Grey as himself (uncredited) (Note: Appears in archival footage)
- Anne Harron as a woman with daughter (uncredited)
- John Harron as a boy with a barrel (uncredited)
- Mary Harron as a wounded girl (uncredited)
- Tessie Harron as a refugee (uncredited)
- Lady Lavery as nurse (uncredited)
- Jules Lemontier as a stretcher bearer (uncredited)
- Adolph Lestina as the grandfather
- David Lloyd George as himself (uncredited)
- Diana Manners as nurse (uncredited)
- René Viviani as himself (uncredited)
- Erich von Stroheim as a Hun (uncredited)
- Francis Marion as the boy's other brother (uncredited)

== Production notes ==
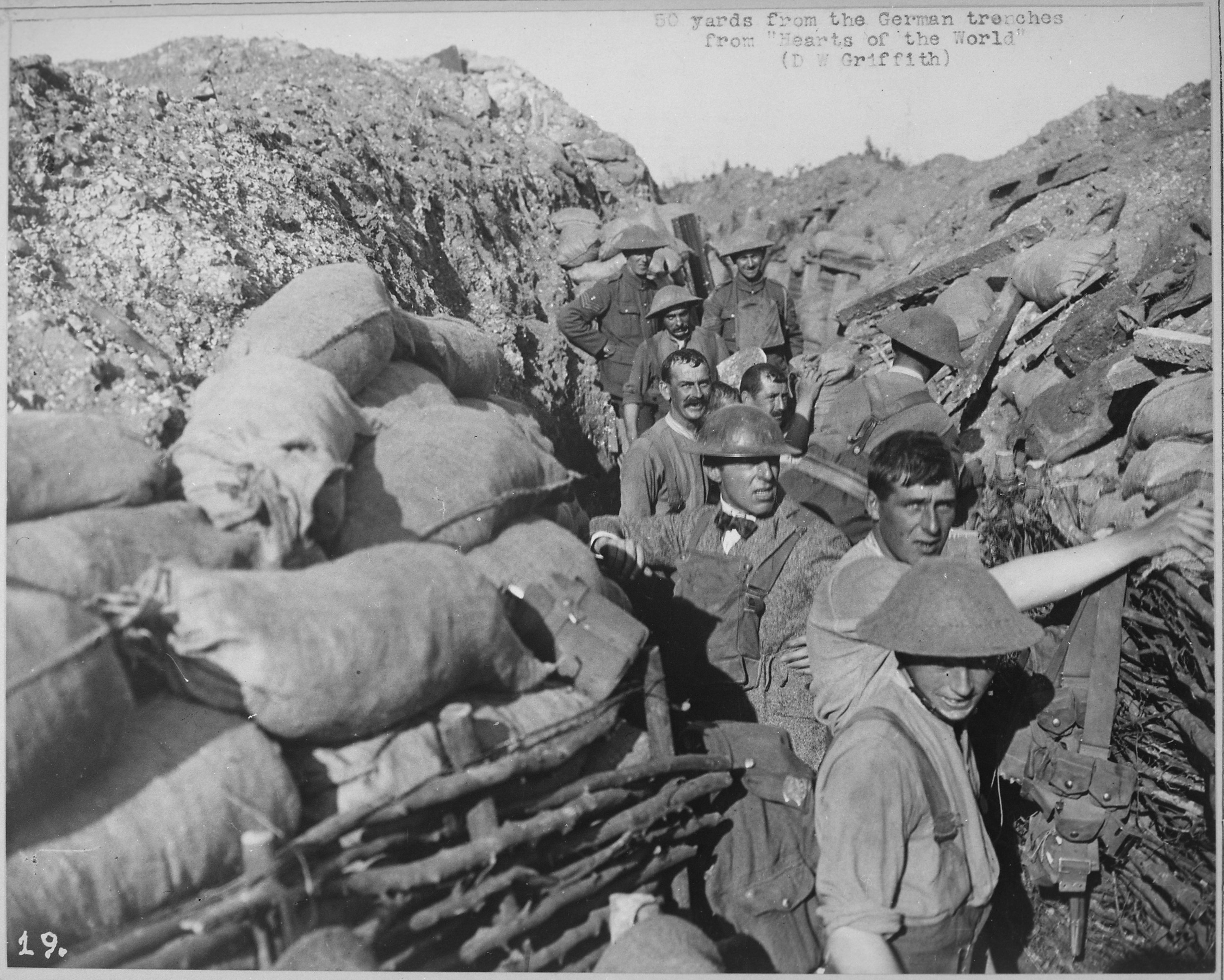
Photo of filming Hearts of the World in France. D. W. Griffith is in the photo in civilian clothing.

The British Government gave D.W. Griffith unprecedented access to film in locations that were otherwise forbidden to journalists. After being presented to George V and Queen Mary, Griffith was introduced to members of London's aristocracy who agreed to appear in the film. Among them were Lady Lavery, Elizabeth Asquith, Diana Manners. Playwright Noël Coward also appeared as an extra.

Exterior shots were largely filmed throughout England from May to October 1917. Griffith made two trips to France where he filmed footage of the trenches. In one instance, Griffith and his film crew were forced to take cover when their location came under German artillery fire; he escaped unscathed. The film company returned to Los Angeles where British and Canadian troops recreated battle scenes and other interior scenes on a stage at Fine Arts Studio in Los Angeles from November to December 1917. The scenes shot in Europe and Los Angeles were edited together with footage from stock newsreels.

In a scene cut from the movie, actress Colleen Moore appeared as a little girl in her bed who, hearing the war raging beyond her window, was so frightened that she turned the hands of her alarm clock forward, hoping that time would rush forward to the end of the fighting.

== Reception ==
Lillian Gish, the actress who portrayed "The Girl", later said:

Hearts of the World enjoyed great success until the Armistice when people lost interest in war films. The film inflamed audiences. Its depiction of German brutality bordered on the absurd. Whenever a German came near me, he beat me or kicked me.

She also noted that:

I don't believe that Mr. Griffith ever forgave himself for making Hearts of the World. "War is the villain," he repeated, "not any particular people."

lobby card

Some historians have also noted that Hearts of the World and similar films encouraged a "hysterical hatred" of the enemy, which complicated the task of the Versailles peacemakers.

Like many American films of the time, Hearts of the World was subject to cuts by city and state film censorship boards. For example, the Chicago Board of Censors required cuts, in Reel 3, of that part of a bayoneting scene showing closeup of a man's side from which a stream of blood flows, Reel 6, that portion of dancing scene where dancer twirls her skirt and exposes posterior to camera, officer carrying young woman off into other room, six scenes of German officer on floor motioning to young woman to come and lie down beside him, closeup of same German officer reaching up with arms for young woman to come to him, closeup of officer and young woman embracing in bunk, officers forcing young peasant women towards bunks, scene showing young women in bunks with clothing disheveled and hair down and officers walking off and adjusting clothes, and the intertitle "Dungeons of Lust" and scenes of young women lying prostrate following the intertitle.

Hearts of the World is referenced in L. M. Montgomery's novel set during World War I, Rilla of Ingleside. Rilla recalls in her diary,

The heroine was struggling with a horrible German soldier who was trying to drag her away. I knew she had a knife—I had seen her hide it, to have it in readiness—and I couldn't understand why she didn't produce it and finish the brute. I thought she must have forgotten it, and just at the tensest moment of the scene I lost my head altogether. I just stood right up on my feet in that crowded house and shrieked at the top of my voice—"The knife is in your stocking—the knife is in your stocking!"

== Status ==
A print of the film still exists and is held by the Cohen Media Group. The rights are now held in the public domain.

== See also ==
World War I Propaganda films:

- The Battle Cry of Peace
- Civilization
- The False Faces
- The Heart of Humanity
- The Kaiser, Beast of Berlin
- The Little American
- Over the Rhine
- To Hell with the Kaiser!
- The Unbeliever
- The Unpardonable Sin
- Yankee Doodle in Berlin
