= The Informer (1912 film) =

1912 film

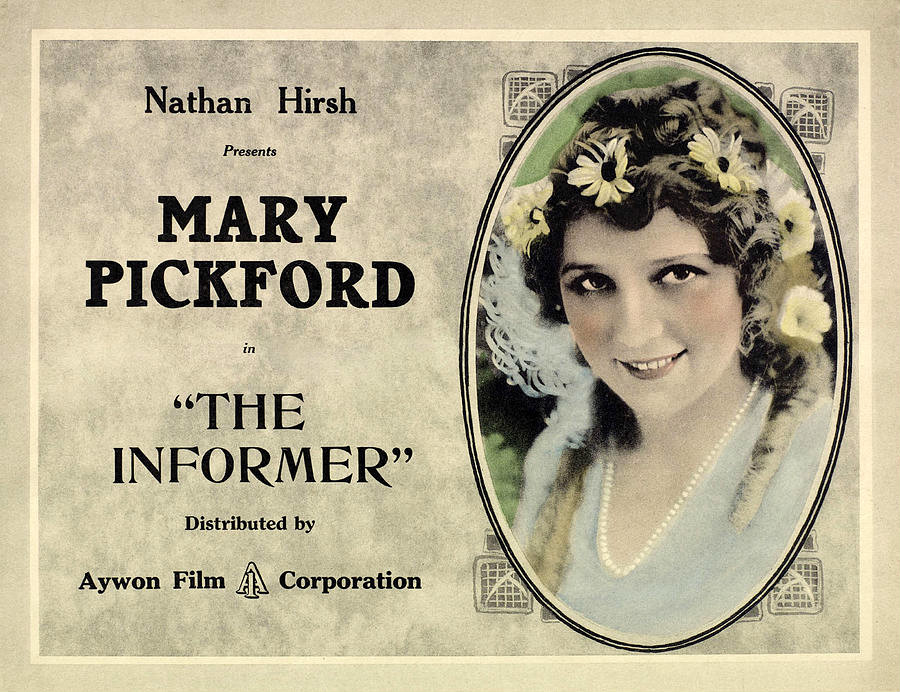
- Lobby card
- Directed by: D. W. Griffith
- Written by: George Hennessy
- Starring: Walter Miller
- Cinematography: G. W. Bitzer
- Distributed by: General Film Company
- Release date: November 21, 1912
- Running time: 18 minutes (16 frame/s)
- Country: United States
- Language: Silent (English intertitles)

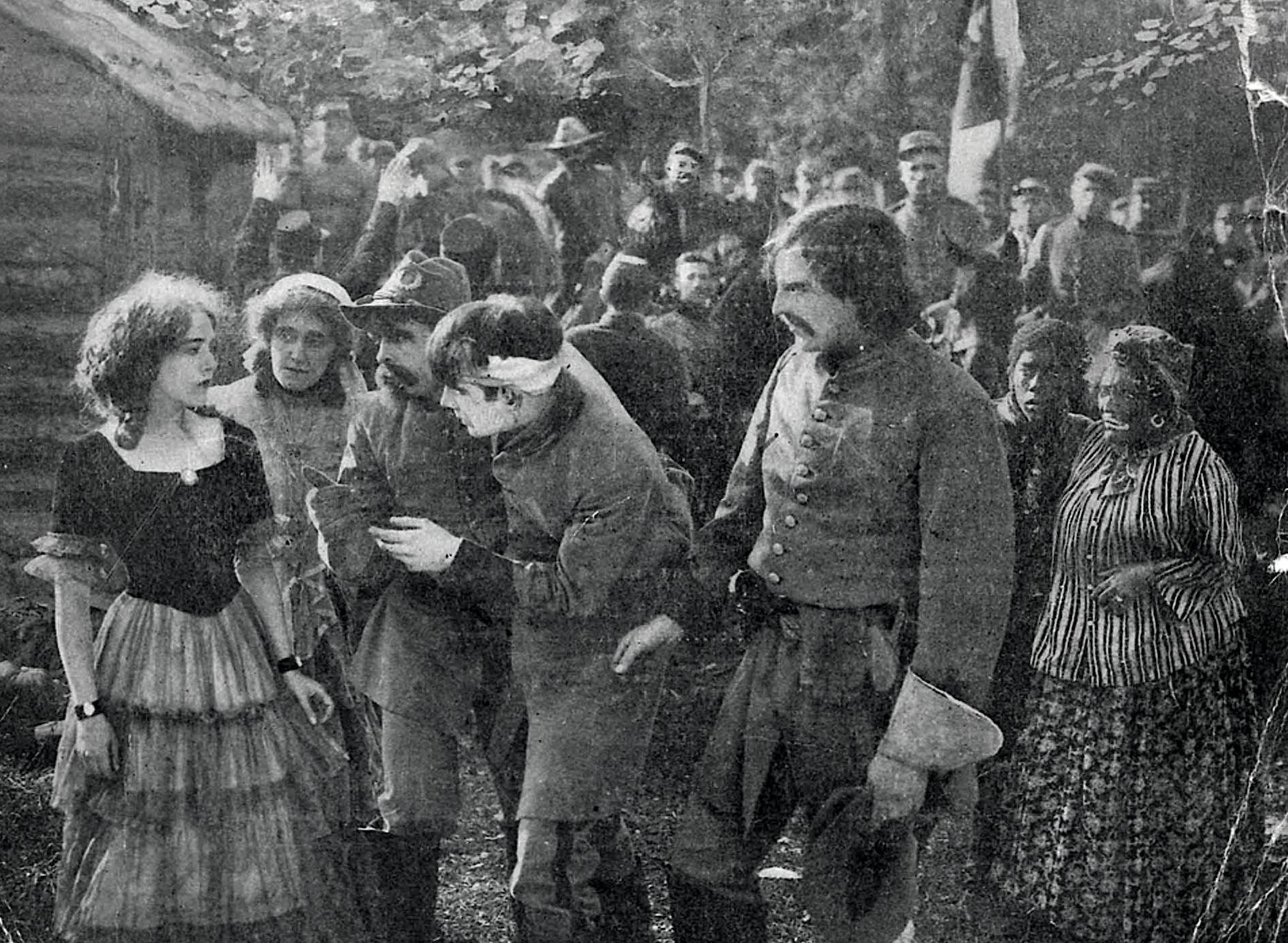
The Informer ad in The Motion Picture Story Magazine, 1912

The Informer, also known as The Informer: A Story of the Civil War, is a 1912 American short drama film directed by D. W. Griffith and featuring Mary Pickford, Henry B. Walthall, Harry Carey, Lionel Barrymore, Dorothy Gish, and Lillian Gish. It was filmed in the Pike County town of Milford, Pennsylvania. Prints of the film survive at the film archive of the Library of Congress.

== Cast ==
- Walter Miller as The Confederate Captain
- Mary Pickford as The Confederate Captain's Sweetheart
- Henry B. Walthall as The False Brother
- Kate Bruce as The Mother
- Harry Carey as The Union Corporal
- Lionel Barrymore as Union Soldier
- Elmer Booth as Union Soldier
- Clara T. Bracy as Negro Servant
- Christy Cabanne
- Edward Dillon as Confederate Soldier
- John T. Dillon as Union Soldier
- Dorothy Gish
- Lillian Gish
- Joseph Graybill as Union Soldier
- Robert Harron
- W. Chrystie Miller
- Gertrude Norman
- Alfred Paget as Confederate General
- Jack Pickford as Negro Boy
- W. C. Robinson as Union Soldier

== See also ==
Mary Pickford filmography Harry Carey filmography Lionel Barrymore filmography Lillian Gish filmography
