= Pathways of Life (1916 film) =

1916 film

- Directed by: Christy Cabanne
- Produced by: Fine Arts Film Company
- Starring: Spottiswoode Aitken; Lillian Gish
- Cinematography: Jack Wagner (assistant)
- Distributed by: Triangle Film Corporation
- Release date: 1916
- Country: United States
- Language: Silent (English intertitles)

Pathways of Life is a 1916 American silent short drama film directed by Christy Cabanne and starring Lillian Gish.

== Cast ==
- Spottiswoode Aitken as Daddy Wisdom
- Lillian Gish
- Olga Grey
- W. E. Lawrence
- Alfred Paget

== Preservation ==
Pathways of Life is a surviving film with a print at the UCLA Film & Television Archive.
