= The Escape (1914 film) =

1914 film

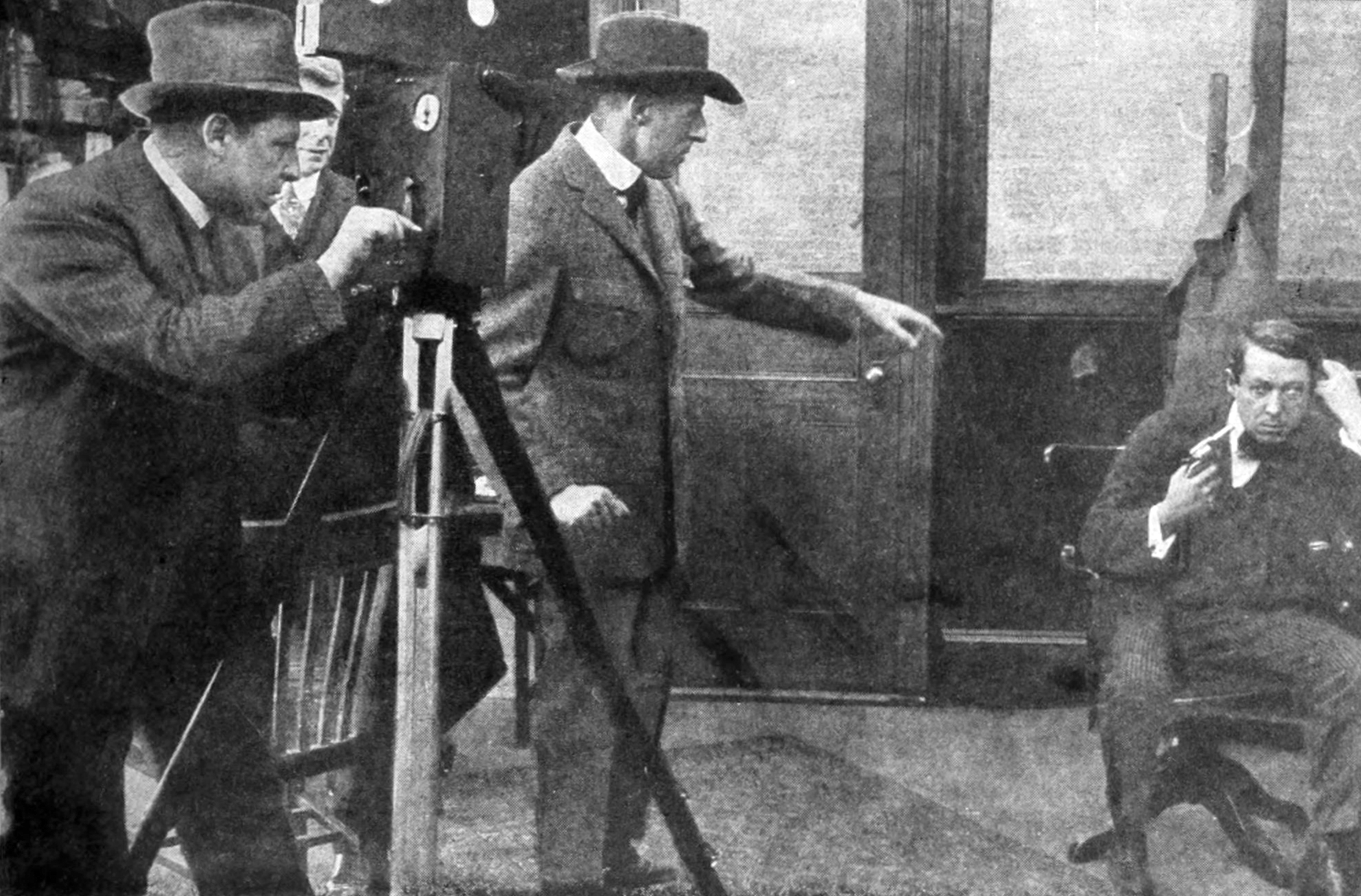
- Still of D. W. Griffith directing is variously attributed to both The Avenging Conscience or this film.
- Directed by: D. W. Griffith
- Written by: D. W. Griffith (uncredited)
- Screenplay by: Paul Armstrong
- Based on: The Escape by Paul Armstrong
- Starring: Donald Crisp; Edna Foster
- Cinematography: G. W. Bitzer
- Edited by: Rose Smith; James Smith (uncredited)
- Distributed by: Mutual Film
- Release date: June 1, 1914 (U.S.)
- Running time: 7 reels
- Country: United States
- Language: Silent (English intertitles)

The Escape is a 1914 American silent drama film written and directed by D. W. Griffith and starred Donald Crisp. The film is based on the play of the same name by Paul Armstrong who also wrote the screenplay. It is considered lost, because the master negative of the production was destroyed in the disastrous 1914 Lubin vault fire in Philadelphia, Pennsylvania.

== Cast ==
- Donald Crisp as "Bull" McGee
- Edna Foster as crippled girl
- Earle Foxe
- Robert Harron as Larry Joyce
- Ralph Lewis as the senator
- Walter Long
- Mae Marsh as Jennie Joyce
- Owen Moore as Dr. Von Eiden
- Blanche Sweet as May Joyce
- Fay Tincher as an adventuress
- F. A. Turner as Jim Joyce
- Tammany Young as McGee's henchman

== Plot ==
The film begins with a prologue on eugenics, contrasting careful animal breeding with human reproduction. This introduces the Joyce family story.

Jim Joyce (Turner) is an abusive father who corrupts his naturally sensitive son Larry (Harron) into cruelty. Larry contracts syphilis and seeks treatment from Dr. Von Eiden (Moore), who also becomes involved with Larry's sister May (Sweet). Von Eiden encourages May to leave her family. She does so but is unable to find stable work and becomes the companion of a wealthy senator (Lewis), while refusing marriage.

May's sister Jennie (Marsh) marries "Bull" McGee (Crisp), an abusive man. After McGee accidentally kills their infant while drunk, Jennie becomes delusional, endlessly rocking the empty cradle with a doll inside. McGee removes her from the household by selling her into prostitution. May intervenes and rescues her, but Jennie dies shortly after.

Von Eiden performs surgery that restores Larry's original sensitivity. May ends her relationship with the senator and agrees to marry Von Eiden.

== Historical background and legacy ==
The Escape was based on a play by Paul Armstrong, a prolific playwright best known for his properties Alias Jimmy Valentine (1909) and Salomy Jane (1907). Griffith's film version was begun first, finished second, but released third among the cycle of five films he made at Reliance-Majestic Studios between his ouster at Biograph Company and the advent of The Birth of a Nation (1915). Filming of The Escape began in New York City, but was completed in Los Angeles partly due to an illness in the cast. There was a long delay in getting it out; although Mutual Film finally released it on June 1, 1914, response to The Escape was of a mixed character and the film was dumped on the States' Rights market by the end of the year.

Lillian Gish recalled The Escape as one of the finest films Griffith ever made, whereas Griffith himself regarded its failure as a momentary distraction during the planning stages of The Birth of a Nation.

== Status ==
Iris Barry first reported The Escape as a lost film in 1940 and despite an international search for Griffith's film output lasting the decades since, The Escape remains one among a small handful of Griffith features that have never been located.

== See also ==
- List of lost films
