= The Little Tease =

1913 film by D. W. Griffith

- Directed by: D. W. Griffith
- Written by: D.W. Griffith
- Starring: Mae Marsh; Henry B. Walthall; Robert Harron
- Cinematography: G.W. Bitzer
- Production company: Biograph Company
- Distributed by: General Film Company; Silent Hall of Fame Enterprises
- Release date: April 12, 1913 (U.S.)
- Running time: 25 minutes
- Country: United States
- Language: Silent (English intertitles)

The Little Tease is a 1913 American silent drama film directed by D. W. Griffith and starring Mae Marsh and Henry B. Walthall.

== Cast ==
- Mae Marsh as The Little Tease, as an adult
- W. Chrystie Miller as The Little Tease's father
- Kate Bruce as The Little Tease's mother
- Robert Harron as Jim
- Henry B. Walthall as the valley man
- Viola Barry as the other woman
- Lionel Barrymore as in bar
- Dorothy Bernard
- Edward Dillon as in lunchroom
- Edna Foster
- Lillian Gish as girl in bandanna
- Walter Miller as on street
- Frank Opperman as on street / in lunchroom / a prospector
- Alfred Paget

== See also ==
- D. W. Griffith filmography
- Lionel Barrymore filmography
- Lillian Gish filmography
