= A Regular Fellow (1919 film) =

1919 film directed by Christy Cabanne

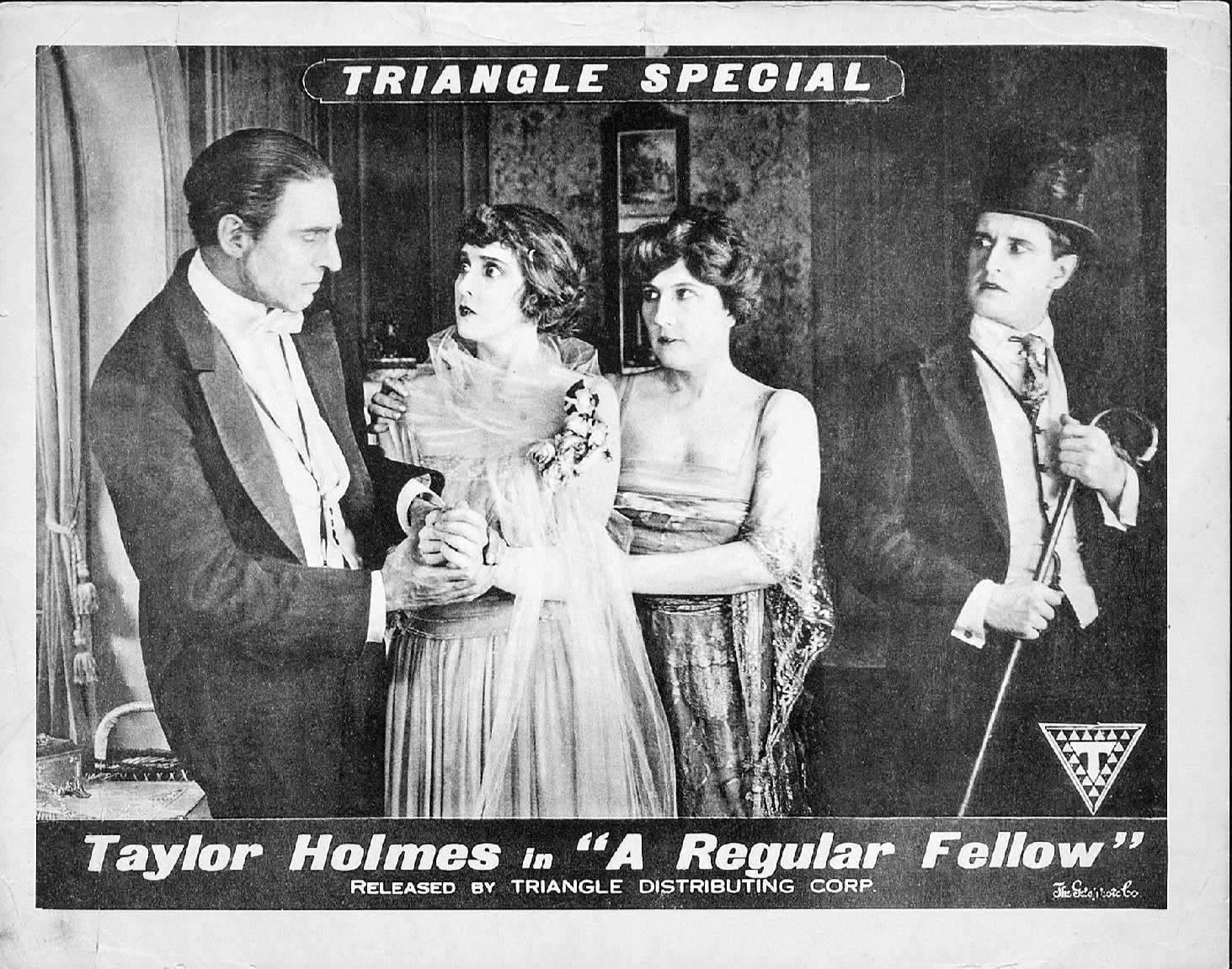
- Lobby card
- Directed by: Christy Cabanne
- Written by: Daniel Carson Goodman
- Starring: Taylor Holmes; Millicent Fisher; Edna Phillips Holmes
- Cinematography: Sam Landers
- Production company: Triangle Film Corp.
- Release date: April 13, 1919 (US)
- Running time: 7 reels
- Country: United States
- Language: Silent (English intertitles)

A Regular Fellow is a 1919 American silent comedy film, directed by Christy Cabanne. It stars Taylor Holmes, Millicent Fisher, and Edna Phillips Holmes, and was released on April 13, 1919.

== Cast ==
- Taylor Holmes as Dalion Pemberton
- Millicent Fisher as Virginia Christy
- Edna Phillips Holmes as Lady Westcott
- Frank Leigh as Count Eugenia
- Aileen Manning as Mrs. Horatio Grimm
- Bert Apling as Oiler Tom
- Lillian Langdon as Mrs. Christy
- Bill Durham as gangster
- Leo Willis as gangster
