= A Nest Unfeathered =

1914 film

- Written by: Minnie Krakauer
- Starring: Harry Carey
- Release date: February 14, 1914
- Country: United States
- Language: Silent with English intertitles

A Nest Unfeathered is a 1914 American drama film featuring Harry Carey.

== Cast ==
- Kate Bruce
- Harry Carey as The Foreman
- Claire McDowell

== See also ==
- Harry Carey filmography
