= Robert Harron =

American actor

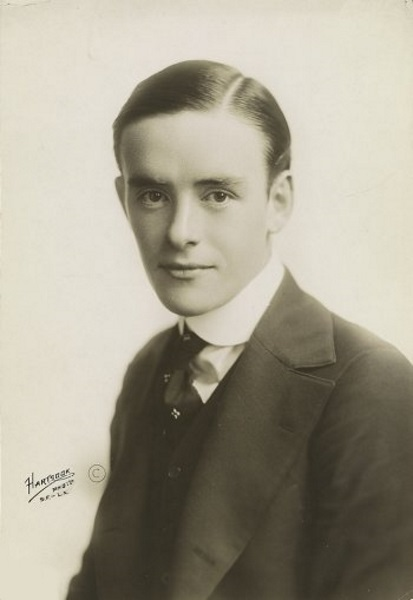
- Harron in 1918
- Born: April 12, 1893; New York City, U.S.
- Died: September 5, 1920 (aged 27); New York City, U.S.
- Resting place: Calvary Cemetery, Queens
- Other names: Bobby Harron
- Occupation: Actor
- Years active: 1907–1920
- Relatives: John Harron (brother)

Robert Emmett Harron (April 12, 1893 – September 5, 1920) was an American motion picture actor of the early silent film era. Although he appeared in over 200 films, he is perhaps best remembered for his roles in the D.W. Griffith directed films The Birth of a Nation (1915) and Intolerance (1916).

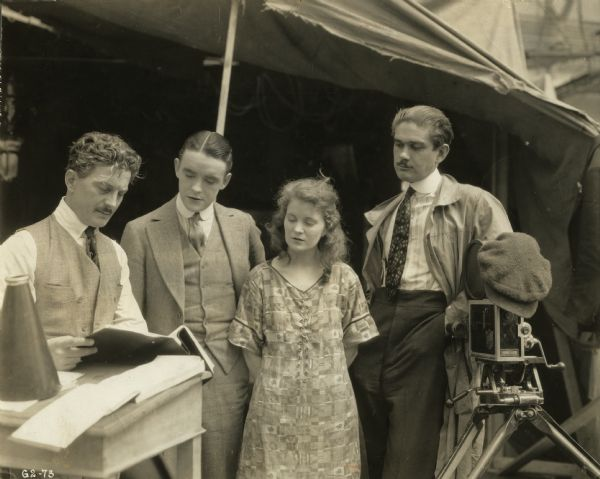
Discussing script on location for Sunshine Alley (1917); from left: director John W. Noble, Harron, actress Mae Marsh, and cameraman George W. Hill

== Early life and family ==
Born in New York City, Harron was the second-oldest child of nine siblings in a poor, working-class Irish Catholic family. Harron's younger siblings John (nicknamed "Johnnie"), Mary, and Charles also became actors while one of his younger sisters, Tessie, was an extra in silent films. Charles was killed in a car accident in December 1915. Tessie died of Spanish influenza in 1918 while Harron's brother John died of spinal meningitis in 1939.

Harron attended the Saint John Parochial School in Greenwich Village. At the age of fourteen, he found work as an errand boy at American Biograph Studios near Union Square in Manhattan to help support his family. In addition to cleaning duties, Harron also appeared as an extra in a few shorts for Biograph.

== Career ==
Within a year of working for Biograph, Harron was noticed by the newly hired director D.W. Griffith. Harron quickly became a favorite of Griffith, and Griffith began to give the 14-year-old increasingly larger film roles. His first film for Griffith was the 1908 comedy A Calamitous Elopement. (He fit the delivery boy costume and was repeatedly used in such roles until he outgrew the outfit.) The teenage Harron was often cast by Griffith in the role of the "sensitive" and "naïve" boy, who was overwhelmingly sympathetic and appealing to American film-goers in the very early years of American motion pictures and not far removed from Harron's real-life persona; Harron was often described as a quiet and soft-spoken youth. It was these traits that helped garner much public interest in the young actor, especially amongst young female fans. In 1912 alone, Harron appeared in nearly forty films at Biograph.

Harron is probably best recalled for his roles in the three epic Griffith films: 1914's Judith of Bethulia, opposite Blanche Sweet, Mae Marsh, Henry B. Walthall, and Dorothy and Lillian Gish; 1915's controversial all-star cast The Birth of a Nation; and 1916's colossal multi-scenario Intolerance opposite such popular stars of the era as Lillian Gish, Mae Marsh, Miriam Cooper, Wallace Reid, Harold Lockwood and Mildred Harris. One of Harron's most popular roles of the era came in 1919 when he starred opposite Lillian Gish in the Griffith directed romantic film True Heart Susie.

Harron's film career continued to flourish throughout the 1910s, and he was occasionally paired with leading actresses Mae Marsh and Lillian Gish in romantic plots, often in roles that cemented his "sensitive boy" image. Harron had, in fact, a burgeoning off-screen romantic relationship with Dorothy Gish. By 1920, Harron had grown too old to continue playing the juvenile roles that had launched his career. He began losing leading man roles to Richard Barthelmess. Later that year, D.W. Griffith agreed to loan Harron to Metro Pictures for a four-picture deal. His first film for Metro, also the last film of his career, was the comedy Coincidence. The film was released in 1921, after Harron's death.

== Death ==
In late August 1920, Harron traveled by train from Los Angeles to New York City to attend the premiere of the film Way Down East and a preview of what would become his final film, Coincidence. Harron checked into the Hotel Seymour on September 1 with his friend, screenwriter and director Victor Heerman, with whom he was sharing a room. Harron and Heerman attended the preview for Coincidence later that day. Heerman later said the preview went poorly because the film was not well-received by the audience.

After the premiere, Harron returned to his hotel room alone. At some point during the evening, Harron sustained a gunshot wound to the chest. According to published reports and Harron's own account, he had the gun in his trunk along with his clothes and other possessions. As he was removing clothes from the trunk, the gun fell to the floor and discharged. Harron was hit in the chest, the bullet having punctured his lung. Harron called the hotel desk for assistance and was still conscious when the hotel manager came to his room. Not realizing he was seriously wounded, Harron joked with the manager that he was in a "devil of a fix" having shot himself. He initially refused to let the manager call an ambulance, only wanting to be examined by a local physician in his room. After a physician could not be found, Harron relented and allowed the manager to call an ambulance. When medics arrived and attempted to transport Harron using a stretcher, he insisted on being taken down in a chair. As he had lost a considerable amount of blood, medics had to convince Harron that he needed to be transported on a stretcher.

Harron was taken to Bellevue Hospital Center, where he remained conscious but in critical condition. While he was being treated, Harron was arrested for possessing a firearm without a permit under the Sullivan Act and placed in the hospital's prison ward. Shortly after the shooting, rumors arose that the shooting was not accidental and Harron had attempted suicide. There was speculation that Harron was disappointed over being passed over for the leading role in Way Down East (Richard Barthelmess was ultimately cast). Several of Harron's friends rejected the attempted suicide theory. Victor Heerman, with whom he often went on double dates and was staying with Harron in the Hotel Seymour, later said that he visited Harron in the hospital, and he denied that he had attempted suicide. Harron admitted the gun belonged to him, but claimed that he had brought it with him because he did not want the gun at the family home in Los Angeles. Harron told Heerman that his younger brother Johnnie had become "hard to handle," and he feared leaving the gun at the family home where Johnnie could find it. Harron told Heerman that he wrapped the gun up in a pair of his trousers and placed them in his suitcase. On the night of the shooting, Harron said he had gone to retrieve the trousers from his suitcase to have them pressed when the gun fell out onto the floor and discharged. Harron also told a priest who visited him in the hospital that the shooting was an accident.

Despite Harron's denial, rumors of attempted suicide persisted. One such rumor was that Harron attempted suicide over the breakup of his relationship with Dorothy Gish. Victor Heerman rejected this theory because Harron, a teetotaler and virgin, was a devout Catholic who would have deemed suicide a mortal sin. Actresses Miriam Cooper and Lillian Gish, both of whom were friends with Harron, agreed with Heerman's reasoning. Cooper and Gish also believed Harron would not have attempted suicide as he was his family's major source of income and had plans to start shooting a new film with Elmer Clifton.

Friends who visited Harron in the hospital were optimistic about his recovery, as he appeared to be on the mend. However, on September 5, four days after he was shot, Harron died of his wound. He is interred at Calvary Cemetery in Woodside, Queens, New York City.

== Filmography ==
Year	Title	Role	Notes
1907	Dr. Skinum	Boy at Door	Short film Lost film
1907	Mr. Gay and Mrs.	Messenger	Short film Lost film
1908	Bobby's Kodak	Son	Short film
1908	At the Crossroads of life	Messenger	Short film
1908	The Snowman	A child	Short film Lost film
1908	Balked at the Altar		Short film
1908	Monday Morning in a Coney Island Police Court	Young Man	Short film
1908	A Calamitous Elopement	George Wilkinson	Short film
1909	Those Awful Hats	Theatre Audience	Short film, Uncredited
1909	A Sound Sleeper	Fighter	Short film Lost film
1909	At the Altar	Boy On Street	Short film
1909	Jones and the Lady Book Agent	Messenger	Short film
1909	A Drunkard's Reformation	Theatre Usher	Short film
1909	The Lonely Villa		Short film
1909	The Hessian Renegades	Farmer	Short film
1909	To Save Her Soul	Stagehand / Usher	Short film
1910	Ramona		Short film
1910	The Modern Prodigal	At Post Office	
1911	The Broken Cross		Short film Lost film
1911	The White Rose of the Wilds	White Rose's Brother	Short film Lost film
1911	Enoch Arden	Teenage Arden Son	Part II
1911	Fighting Blood	The Old Soldier's Son	Short film
1911	A Country Cupid	Among Students	Short film
1911	The Last Drop of Water	In Wagon Train	Short film
1911	The Battle	A Union soldier	Short film
1911	The Miser's Heart	Bakeshop Assistant	Short film
1912	For His Son	At Soda Fountain	Short film, Uncredited
1912	The Transformation of Mike	At Dance	Short film
1912	Under Burning Skies	On Street / At Farewell Party	Short film
1912	A String of Pearls	In Tenement	Short film Lost film
1912	One Is Business, the Other Crime	Delivery Boy	Uncredited, Short film
1912	The Lesser Evil	In Smuggler Band	Short film
1912	A Temporary Truce	The Murdered Indian's Son	Short film
1912	Man's Lust for Gold	The Prospector's Son	Short film Lost film
1912	The Inner Circle	In Crowd / Accident Witness	Short film
1912	A Change of Spirit	Young Man on Street	Short film Lost film Uncredited
1912	Two Daughters of Eve	At Stage Door	Short film
1912	Friends	Stableboy	Short film, Uncredited
1912	So Near, Yet So Far	The Rival / In Club	Short film
1912	A Feud in the Kentucky Hills	A brother	Short film
1912	The Painted Lady	Beau at Ice Cream Festival	Short film, Uncredited
1912	The Musketeers of Pig Alley	Rival Gang Member / In Alley / At Dance	Short film
1912	Heredity	Indian	Short film Lost film
1912	The Informer	The Southern Boy	Short
1912	A Sailor's Heart	On Porch	Short film Uncredited
1912	Brutality		Short film
1912	The New York Hat	Youth outside church	Short film
1912	My Hero	The Young Man	Short film Lost film
1912	The Burglar's Dilemma	Young Burglar	Short film
1912	A Cry for Help	Witness to Accident	Short film Lost film
1913	A Misappropriated Turkey	Union Member	Short film Lost film
1913	Brothers	The Father's Favorite Son	Short film Lost film
1913	Oil and Water	Minor Role	Short film Uncredited
1913	Love in an Apartment Hotel	The Desk Clerk	Short film Lost film
1913	Broken Ways	In Telegraph Office	Short film
1913	Near to Earth	Gato's Brother	Short film Lost film
1913	Fate	The Beloved Son	Short film
1913	The Sheriff's Baby	The Deputy	Short film Lost film
1913	A Misunderstood Boy	The Son	Short film
1913	The House of Darkness	Asylum Guard	Short film
1913	A Timely Interception	The Farmer's Adopted Son	Short film
1913	Death's Marathon	The Messenger	Short film
1913	The Sorrowful Shore	One of the Son's Friends	Short film
1913	The Battle at Elderbush Gulch	The father	Short film
1913	The Tender Hearted Boy	The Tender Hearted Boy	Short film Lost film
1913	The Little Tease	Jim	
1913	The Yaqui Cur	Strongheart	
1914	Judith of Bethulia	Nathan	
1914	The Battle of the Sexes	John Andrews, the son	Lost film A fragment survives
1914	Brute Force	Harry Faulkner	Short, Prologue - Weakhands (The Old Days)
1914	The Great Leap; Until Death Do Us Part	Bobby Dawson	Lost film
1914	The Life of General Villa	American lover	Lost film
1914	Home, Sweet Home	The Easterner, Robert Winthrop	
1914	The Escape	Larry Joyce	Lost film
1914	The Rebellion of Kitty Belle	Joe Belle	Short film Lost film
1914	The Avenging Conscience	The Grocer's boy	
1914	The Idiot	The Idiot	Short film Lost film
1915	The Birth of a Nation	Tod Stoneman	
1915	The Outcast	Bob	Lost film
1915	The Outlaw's Revenge	American lover	Lost film
1915	Her Shattered Idol	Robert	
1915	The Missing Links	Henry Gaylord	Lost film
1916	Hoodoo Ann	Jimmie Vance	
1916	A Child of the Paris Streets	Jimmie Parker	
1916	A Wild Girl of the Sierras	Bob Jordan	Lost film
1916	The Marriage of Molly-O	Larry O'Dea	Lost film
1916	Intolerance: Love's Struggle Throughout the Ages	The Boy (Modern Story)	
1916	The Little Liar	Bobby	Lost film
1916	The Wharf Rat	Edward Holmes	Lost film
1917	The Bad Boy	Jimmie Bates	Lost film
1918	An Old-Fashioned Young Man	Frank Trent	
1918	Sunshine Alley	Ned Morris	Lost film
1918	Hearts of the World	The Boy, Douglas Gordon Hamilton	Uncredited
1918	The Great Love	Jim Young	Lost film
1918	The Greatest Thing in Life	Edward Livingston	Lost film
1918	A Romance of Happy Valley	John L. Logan, Jr.	
1919	The Girl Who Stayed at Home	James Grey	
1919	True Heart Susie	William Jenkins	
1919	The Mother and the Law	The Boy	
1919	The Greatest Question	Jimmie Hilton	
1921	Coincidence	Billy Jenks	Posthumous release Lost film

== Bibliography ==
- John Holmstrom, The Moving Picture Boy: An International Encyclopaedia from 1895 to 1995, Norwich, Michael Russell, 1996, p. 10.
