= Kate Bruce =

American actress (1860–1946)

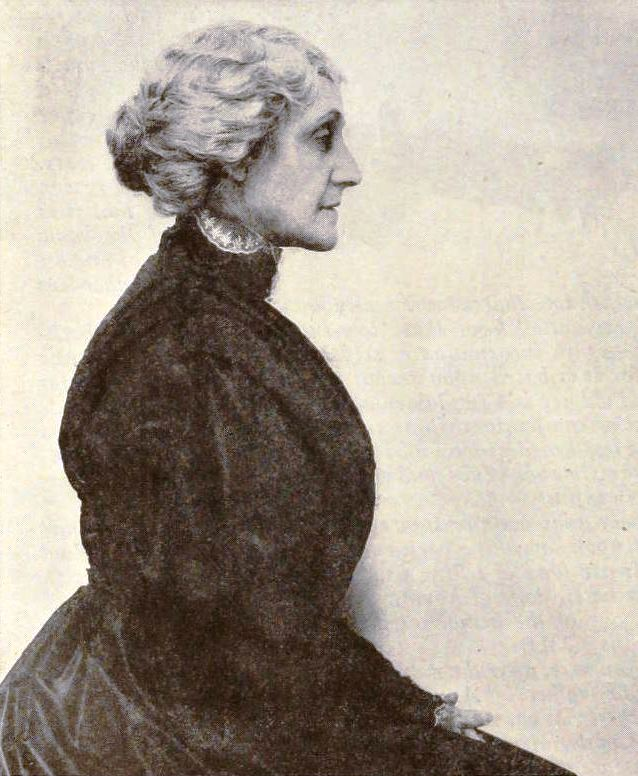
- Bruce in 1921 Photoplay
- Born: Kate Bruce Bryant; February 17, 1860; Columbus, Indiana, U.S.
- Died: April 2, 1946 (aged 86); Bronx, New York City, U.S.
- Resting place: Gate of Heaven Cemetery
- Occupation: Actress
- Years active: 1903–1931

Kate Bruce Bryant (February 17, 1860 – April 2, 1946) was an American actress of the silent era, famed for her screen portrayals of mothers. She appeared in more than 280 films between 1908 and 1931.

== Early life and career ==
Born and raised in Columbus, Indiana, Bruce was the youngest of three children of Newton and Matilda Bryant. In 1885, she left Boone, Iowa, in a wagon with a group of traveling actors at a time when stages were illuminated by oil lights. On Broadway, Bruce performed in The Starbucks (1903). The following year she toured in Our New Man with Harry Beresford.

== Death ==
Bruce died at the age of 86 in the Bronx, New York on April 2, 1946. She was buried at the Gate of Heaven Cemetery in Hawthorne, New York. Later that month, Hedda Hopper reported that Bruce's entire estate had been left to her longtime friends and sometime co-stars Lillian and Dorothy Gish.

== Partial filmography ==
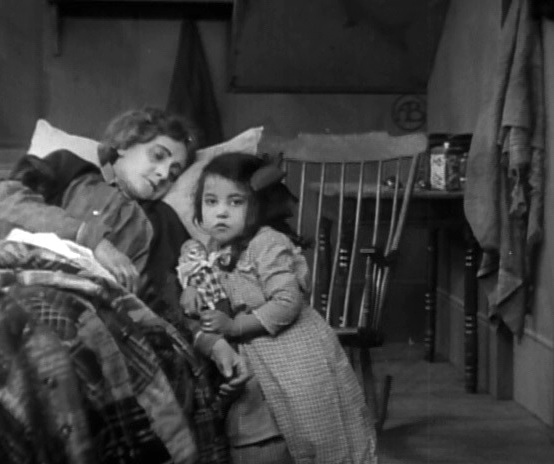
Bruce (left) with Ynez Seabury in The Sunbeam (1912)

- The Greaser's Gauntlet (1908)
- Betrayed by a Handprint (1908)
- Behind the Scenes (1908)
- An Awful Moment (1908)
- One Touch of Nature (1909)
- The Golden Louis (1909)
- At the Altar (1909)
- The Girls and Daddy (1909)
- The Country Doctor (1909)
- The Hessian Renegades (1909)
- The Red Man's View (1909)
- A Trap for Santa (1909)
- In Little Italy (1909)
- To Save Her Soul (1909)
- Choosing a Husband (1909)
- The Rocky Road (1910)
- All on Account of the Milk (1910)
- The Woman from Mellon's (1910)
- The Two Brothers (1910)
- A Romance of the Western Hills (1910)
- The Unchanging Sea (1910)
- Ramona (1910)
- May and December (1910)
- What the Daisy Said (1910)
- The Lucky Toothache (1910)
- The Fugitive (1910)
- The Modern Prodigal (1910)
- His Trust (1911)
- His Trust Fulfilled (1911)
- The Spanish Gypsy (1911)
- How She Triumphed (1911)
- Fighting Blood (1911)
- A Country Cupid (1911)
- The Long Road (1911)
- Swords and Hearts (1911)
- Her Awakening (1911)
- The Battle (1911)
- The Voice of the Child (1911)
- The Eternal Mother (1912)
- The Transformation of Mike (1912)
- A String of Pearls (1912)
- The Punishment (1912)
- Won by a Fish (1912)
- One Is Business, the Other Crime (1912)
- The Spirit Awakened (1912)
- The School Teacher and the Waif (1912)
- A Feud in the Kentucky Hills (1912)
- The One She Loved (1912)
- The Painted Lady (1912)
- Heredity (1912)
- The Informer (1912)
- Just Like a Woman (1912)
- The New York Hat (1912)
- My Hero (1912)
- A Cry for Help (1912)
- The Telephone Girl and the Lady (1913)
- A Girl's Stratagem (1913)
- The Unwelcome Guest (1913)
- The Sheriff's Baby (1913)
- A Frightful Blunder (1913)
- A Misunderstood Boy (1913)
- The Wanderer (1913)
- The Stolen Loaf (1913)
- The House of Darkness (1913)
- Olaf—An Atom (1913)
- Just Gold (1913)
- The Mothering Heart (1913)
- The Enemy's Baby (1913)
- The Perfidy of Mary (1913)
- The Strong Man's Burden (1913)
- The Stopped Clock (1913)
- The Battle at Elderbush Gulch (1913)
- The Tender Hearted Boy (1913)
- The Little Tease (1913)
- The Yaqui Cur (1913)
- A Nest Unfeathered (1914)
- Judith of Bethulia (1914)
- The Rebellion of Kitty Belle (1914)
- His Desperate Deed (1915)
- Intolerance (1916)
- Gretchen the Greenhorn (1916)
- The House Built Upon Sand (1916)
- Souls Triumphant (1917)
- Madame Bo-Peep (1917)
- Betsy's Burglar (1917)
- A Woman's Awakening (1917)
- Time Locks and Diamonds (1917)
- The Stainless Barrier (1917)
- Hearts of the World (1918)
- Lillian Gish in a Liberty Loan Appeal (1918)
- The Greatest Thing in Life (1918)
- A Romance of Happy Valley (1919)
- Scarlet Days (1919)
- True Heart Susie (1919)
- Way Down East (1920)
- Flying Pat (1920)
- The City of Silent Men (1921)
- His Darker Self (1924)
- A Bowery Cinderella (1927)
- Ragtime (1927)
- The Struggle (1931)
