= Alfred Paget =

British actor (1870–1919)

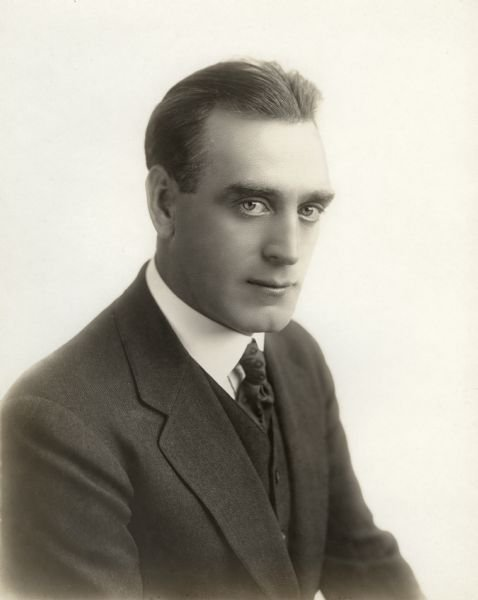
- Paget in 1916.
- Born: 2 June 1879; London, England
- Died: 8 October 1919 (aged 40); Winnipeg, Manitoba, Canada
- Resting place: Brookside Cemetery, Winnipeg
- Occupation: Actor
- Years active: 1908–1918
- Spouse: Leila Halstead Paget

Alfred Paget (2 June 1879 – 8 October 1919) was an English silent film actor best known for his portrayal of Prince Belshazzar in D.W. Griffith's 1916 historical epic Intolerance. He appeared in more than 230 films between 1908 and 1918. Prior to his film career, he had served from 1899 to 1903 in the Royal Horse Guards of the British Army.

He served in South Africa during the Second Boer War from July to November 1900, receiving the Queen's South Africa Medal with clasps for Cape Colony, Orange Free State, and Transvaal. In April 1918 he travelled to Canada and enrolled in the Canadian Expeditionary Force, being assigned to the 34th Fort Garry Horse Depot Squadron in Winnipeg as an instructor. He was quickly promoted to the rank of Sergeant due to his previous service and experience.

Paget was married to Leila Halstead. In the summer of 1919, he contracted a form of malarial fever, and died in Winnipeg on 8 October 1919. He is buried in the Field Of Honour in Brookside Cemetery, Winnipeg.

== Filmography ==
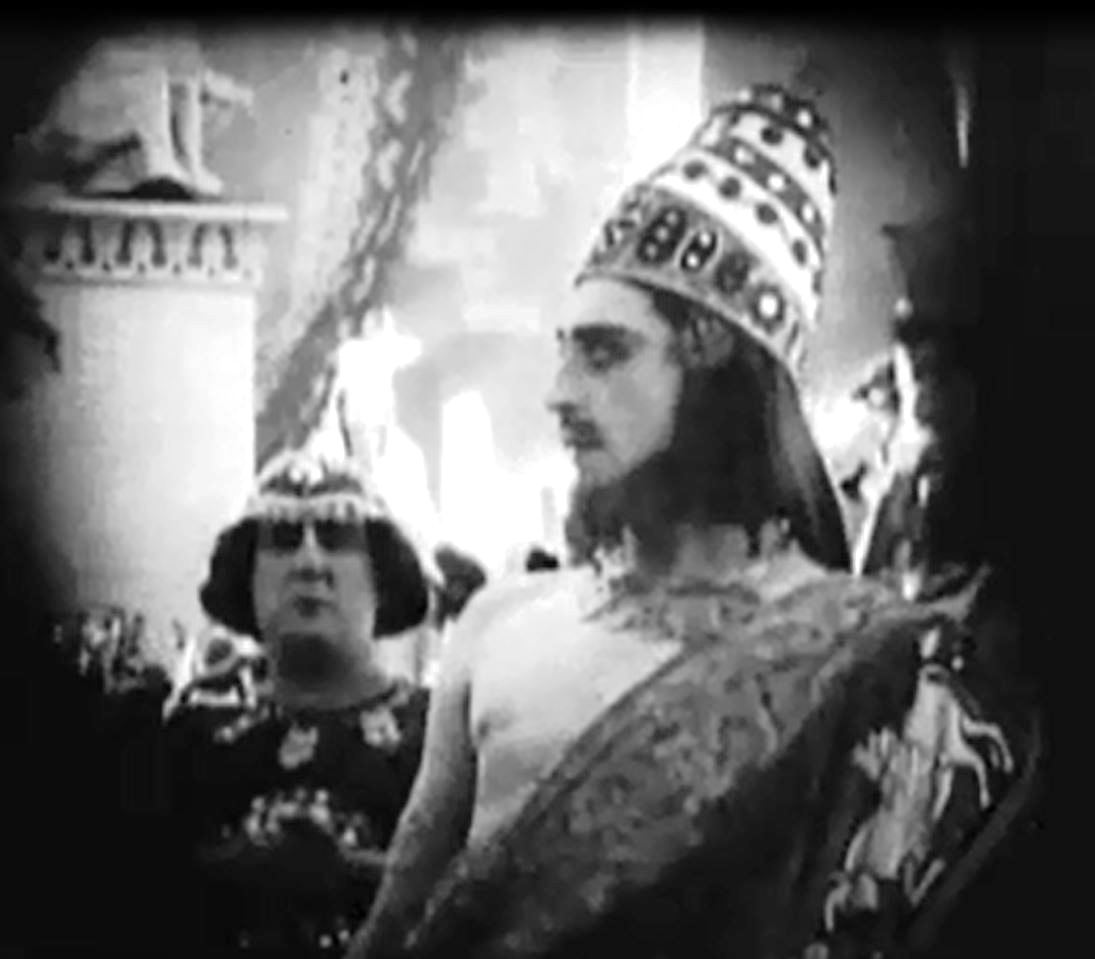
Paget as Prince Belshazzar of Babylon in Intolerance (1916)

Year	Title	Role	Notes
1908	Romance of a Jewess		Short
1909	The Red Man's View	Silver Eagle	Short, Uncredited
1910	The Two Brothers	Mexican	Short
1910	A Romance of the Western Hills	Indian	Short
1910	The Unchanging Sea	Villager	Short
1910	In the Border States	Union Soldier	Short
1910	A Flash of Light	Wedding Guest	Short
1910	The House with Closed Shutters	On Porch / At Farewell	Short
1910	The Modern Prodigal	Guard	Short
1910	A Mohawk's Way	Indian	Short
1911	His Trust	Messenger / Confederate soldier	Short
1911	What Shall We Do with Our Old?	In shop	Short
1911	The Lily of the Tenements	A Customer	Short
1911	Enoch Arden	A Shipwrecked Sailor	Short
1911	The Indian Brothers	In Second Tribe / At Funeral	Short
1911	A Country Cupid	A Farmer	Short
1911	The Last Drop of Water	An Indian / In Wagon Train	Short
1911	Out from the Shadow	At Dance	Short
1911	The Blind Princess and the Poet		Short
1911	The Battle	Confederate Officer	Short
1911	The Miser's Heart	Policeman	Short
1911	A Woman Scorned	The Sneak Thief's Companion	Short
1912	The Old Bookkeeper	A Thief	Short
1912	For His Son	In Office	Short, Uncredited
1912	Under Burning Skies	Emily's Husband's Friend	Short
1912	The Goddess of Sagebrush Gulch	A Cowboy	Short
1912	One Is Business, the Other Crime		Short
1912	The Lesser Evil	The Leader of the Smugglers	Short
1912	A Temporary Truce	A Drunken Cutthroat / An Indian / Among Rescuers	Short
1912	The Spirit Awakened	The Renegade Farmhand	Short
1912	The Inner Circle	Police Agent	Short
1912	Blind Love	A Policeman	Short
1912	Two Daughters of Eve	In Audience	Short
1912	The Chief's Blanket	The Unfaithful Sentinel	Short
1912	The Girl and Her Trust	A Tramp	Short
1912	In the Aisles of the Wild	An Indian	Short
1912	The Musketeers of Pig Alley	Rival Gang Leader	Short
1912	Heredity	Indian / Woodsman	Short
1912	Gold and Glitter	In Canoe	Short
1912	My Baby	The Married Sister's Husband	Short
1912	The Informer	Confederate General	Short
1912	Brutality	Outside Bar	Short
1912	The New York Hat	The Doctor	Short
1912	My Hero	Indian	Short
1912	The Burglar's Dilemma	Interrogating Detective	Short
1912	A Cry for Help	Policeman	Short
1912	The School Teacher and the Waif		Short
1913	The Telephone Girl and the Lady	The Telephone Girl's Sweetheart	Short
1913	An Adventure in the Autumn Woods	The Woodsman	Short
1913	The Tender Hearted Boy	Policeman	Short, Uncredited
1913	Oil and Water	Among Dancers	Short, Uncredited
1913	Drink's Lure	The Policeman	Short
1913	Broken Ways	In Posse	Short, Uncredited
1913	A Girl's Stratagem	The Saloon Keeper	Short
1913	The Sheriff's Baby	The Sheriff	Short
1913	A Misunderstood Boy	The Vigilante Leader	Short
1913	The Left-Handed Man	Policeman	Short
1913	The Tenderfoot's Money		Short
1913	The House of Darkness	Asylum Guard	Short, Uncredited
1913	Just Gold	Second Brother	Short
1913	A Timely Interception	The Oil Syndicate	Short
1913	Red Hicks Defies the World	In Crowd	Short, Uncredited
1913	Almost a Wild Man	In Audience	Short, Uncredited
1913	The Mothering Heart	Club Patron	Short, Uncredited
1913	Two Men of the Desert	An Indian	Short
1913	A Woman in the Ultimate	Member of the Badger Gang	Short
1913	A Modest Hero	First Policeman	Short
1913	The Battle at Elderbush Gulch	Waifs' uncle	Short
1913	The Little Tease		Short
1913	The Yaqui Cur	In Tribe	Short
1914	Judith of Bethulia	Bethulian / Assyrian Soldier	
1914	Brute Force	In Club / Tribesman	Short, (Prologue) / (The Old Days)
1914	The Rebellion of Kitty Belle		Short
1915	Enoch Arden	Enoch Arden	Short
1915	The Absentee	Evil	
1915	Strathmore	Bertie Errol	
1915	The Lamb	Bill Cactus	
1915	The Gambler of the West		
1915	Martyrs of the Alamo	James Bowie	
1916	Intolerance	Prince Belshazzar	
1916	The Old Folks at Home		
1916	The Heiress at Coffee Dan's	Bert Gallagher	
1916	Pathways of Life		Short
1917	Nina, the Flower Girl	Archie Dean	
1917	Big Timber	Charlie Benton	
1917	Aladdin and the Wonderful Lamp	The Sultan	
1917	The Fair Barbarian	Mr. Burmistone	
1918	Cupid's Round Up	Jim Cocksey	
1918	The Girl with the Champagne Eyes	Matt	
1919	When a Girl Loves	Ben Grant	
