= List of Biograph films released in 1910 =

This is a list of all 113 Biograph films released in 1910.

== Releases ==
Title	Release	Ref	Notes	Status
The Rocky Road	January 3, 1910			
The Dancing Girl of Butte	January 6, 1910			
Her Terrible Ordeal	January 10, 1910			
All on Account of the Milk	January 13, 1910			
On the Reef	January 17, 1910			
The Call	January 20, 1910			
The Honor of His Family	January 24, 1910			
The Last Deal	January 27, 1910			
The Cloister's Touch	January 31, 1910			
The Woman from Mellon's	February 3, 1910			
The Course of True Love	February 7, 1910			
The Duke's Plan	February 10, 1910			
One Night and Then	February 14, 1910			
The Englishman and the Girl	February 17, 1910			
His Last Burglary	February 21, 1910			
Taming a Husband	February 24, 1910			
The Final Settlement	February 28, 1910			
The Newlyweds	March 3, 1910			
The Thread of Destiny	March 7, 1910			
In Old California (1910 film)	March 10, 1910			
The Converts	March 14, 1910			
The Love Of Lady Irma	March 17, 1910			
Faithful (1910 film)	March 21, 1910			
The Twisted Trail	March 24, 1910			
Gold is Not All	March 28, 1910			
The Smoker	March 31, 1910			
His Last Dollar	March 31, 1910			
As It Is in Life	April 4, 1910			
A Rich Revenge	April 7, 1910			
A Romance of the Western Hills	April 11, 1910			
The Kid	April 14, 1910			
Thou Shalt Not	April 18, 1910			
The Tenderfoot's Triumph	April 21, 1910			
The Way of the World	April 25, 1910			
Up A tree	April 28, 1910			
The Gold Seekers	May 2, 1910			
The Unchanging Sea	May 5, 1910			
Love Among the Roses	May 9, 1910			
The Two Brothers	May 12, 1910			
Over Silent Paths	May 16, 1910			
An Affair of Hearts	May 19, 1910			
Ramona	May 23, 1910			
A Knot in the Plot	May 26, 1910			
The Impalement	May 30, 1910			
In the Season of Buds	June 2, 1910			
A Child of the Ghetto	June 6, 1910			
A Victim of Jealousy	June 9, 1910			
On the Border States	June 13, 1910			
The Face at the Window	June 16, 1910			
Never Again	June 20, 1910			
The Marked Time Table	June 23, 1910			
A Child's Impulse	June 27, 1910			
Muggsy's First Sweetheart	June 30, 1910			
The Purgation	July 4, 1910			
A Midnight Cupid	July 7, 1910			
What the Daisy Said	July 11, 1910			
A Child's Faith	July 14, 1910			
A Flash of Light	July 18, 1910			
As the Bells Rang Out	July 21, 1910			
Serious Sixteen	July 21, 1910			
The Call to Arms	July 25, 1910			
Unexpected Help	July 28, 1910			
An Arcadian Maid	August 1, 1910			
Her Father's Pride	August 4, 1910			
The Usurer	August 15, 1910			
When We Were in Our 'Teens	August 18, 1910			
An Old Story with a New Ending	August 18, 1910			
The Sorrows of the Unfaithful	August 22, 1910			
Wilful Peggy	August 25, 1910			
The Modern Prodigal	August 29, 1910			
The Affair of an Egg	September 1, 1910			
Muggsy Becomes a Hero	September 1, 1910			
A Summer Idyl	September 5, 1910			
Little Angels of Luck	September 8, 1910			
A Mohawk's Way	September 12, 1910			
In Life's Cycle	September 15, 1910			
A Summer Tragedy	September 19, 1910			
The Oath and the Man	September 22, 1910			
Rose O'Salem-Town	September 26, 1910			
Examination Day at School	September 29, 1910			
The Iconoclast	October 3, 1910			
A Gold Necklace	October 6, 1910			
How Hubby Got a Raise	October 6, 1910			
That Chink at Golden Gulch	October 10, 1910			
The Lucky Toothache	October 13, 1910			
The Masher	October 13, 1910			
The Broken Doll	October 17, 1910			
The Banker's Daughter	October 20, 1910			
Message of the Violin	October 24, 1910			
Passing of a Grouch	October 27, 1910			
The Proposal	October 27, 1910			
Two Little Waifs	October 31, 1910			
Waiter No. 5	November 3, 1910			
The Fugitive	November 7, 1910			
Simple Charity	November 10, 1910			
Sunshine Sue	November 14, 1910			
The Troublesome Baby	November 17, 1910			
Love in Quarantine	November 17, 1910			
The Song of the Wildwood Flute	November 21, 1910			
His New Lid	November 24, 1910			
A Plain Song	November 28, 1910			
Effecting a Cure	December 1, 1910			
A Child's Stratagem	December 5, 1910			
Turning the Tables	December 8, 1910			
Happy Jack, a Hero	December 8, 1910			
The Golden Supper	December 12, 1910			
His Sister-in-Law	December 15, 1910			
The Lesson	December 19, 1910			
The White Roses	December 22, 1910			
The Recreation of an Heiress	December 22, 1910			
Winning Back His Love	December 26, 1910			
His Wife's Sweetheart	December 29, 1910			
After the Ball	December 29, 1910			

== Bibliography ==
- Moving Picture World Volume 6. New York, Chalmers Publishing Company. 1910.
- Moving Picture World Volume 7. New York, Chalmers Publishing Company. 1910.
- Moving Picture World Volume 8. New York, Chalmers Publishing Company. 1911.
