= Anna Mae Walthall =

American actress

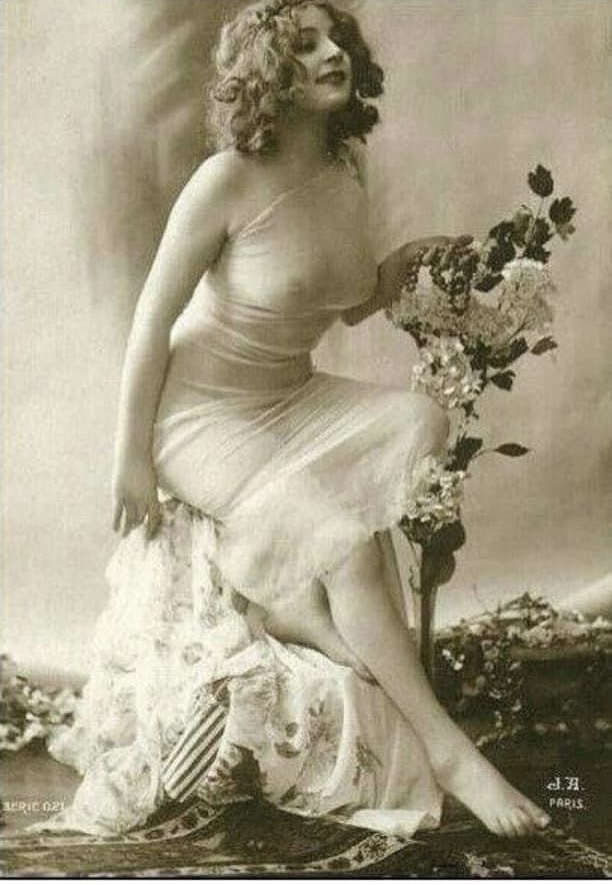
- circa 1919
- Born: Anna May Walthall; October 3, 1894; Alabama, United States
- Died: April 17, 1950 (aged 55); Van Nuys, California, United States
- Father: Junius Leigh Walthall
- Relatives: Henry B. Walthall (brother)

Anna Mae Walthall (3 October 1894–17 April 1950) (also billed as Anna May Walthall) was an American actress of silent films, appearing in 24 films from 1914 to 1926.

She was born as Anna May Walthall in 1894 (possibly in 1890) on a cotton plantation owned by her father in Shelby County in Alabama, the second youngest of eleven children of Junius Leigh Walthall, a former officer in the Confederate Army during the Civil War, and Anne Mallory née Wallace. Her older brother was the actor Henry B. Walthall. In 1911 aged 18 she married Robert Lee Rhodes in La Junta in Colorado. The marriage was later dissolved.

Since she retired in 1926, her film roles were Pre-Hays Code; often she appeared semi-nude in see-through sheer clothing. Her first film role was as an unnamed party guest in Ethel's Roof Party (1914), quickly followed by Ethel Has a Steady (1914). In 1915 she appeared in ten films including: Beth Slade in Light o' Love, Lib in The Fable of the Through Train, Mrs Drummer in Home Again, and Senorita Ynez in At the Stroke of the Angelus. Her other films included Favorite of the Harem (uncredited) in Intolerance (1916); Mrs Dana in The Truant Soul (1916); Mrs Dibby in The Five Dollar Bill (1917); Mary Elizabeth in The Lighted Lamp (1917); a French peasant girl in Hearts of the World (1918); Amanda Garcia in With Hoops of Steel (1919), and Pauline in The Trembling Hour (1919). She played the nude Rudy in Bare Fists (1919), was Flozella in The Desert Flower and the Duchess in As Man Desires, both in 1925. Her last film was as Mazzie in The Fighting Marine (1926).

Walthall married Luther Osgood Eldridge on 9 June 1926, in Orange, California, at which time she retired from acting. Their son was Luther Osgood Eldridge Jr (1926-2008) and their daughter, George Ann Eldridge (1929-2021).

She died in April 1950 at Van Nuys in California aged 55. She died on the same day as her sister, Natalie Walthall Ashton.
