= The Kid (1910 film) =

1910 film

- Directed by: Frank Powell
- Produced by: D.W. Griffith
- Starring: Henry B. Walthall
- Cinematography: Arthur Marvin
- Distributed by: Biograph Company
- Release date: April 14, 1910
- Country: United States
- Language: Silent with English intertitles

The Kid is a 1910 American short silent drama film directed by Frank Powell and starring Henry B. Walthall. Mary Pickford and Blanche Sweet are listed as appearing in this film, but their parts are unconfirmed.

== Cast ==
- Henry B. Walthall - Walter Holden
- Jack Pickford - Walter Holden's Son
- Florence Barker - Doris Marshall
- Mary Pickford (unconfirmed)
- Blanche Sweet (unconfirmed)
