= Humdrum Brown =

1918 film directed by Rex Ingram

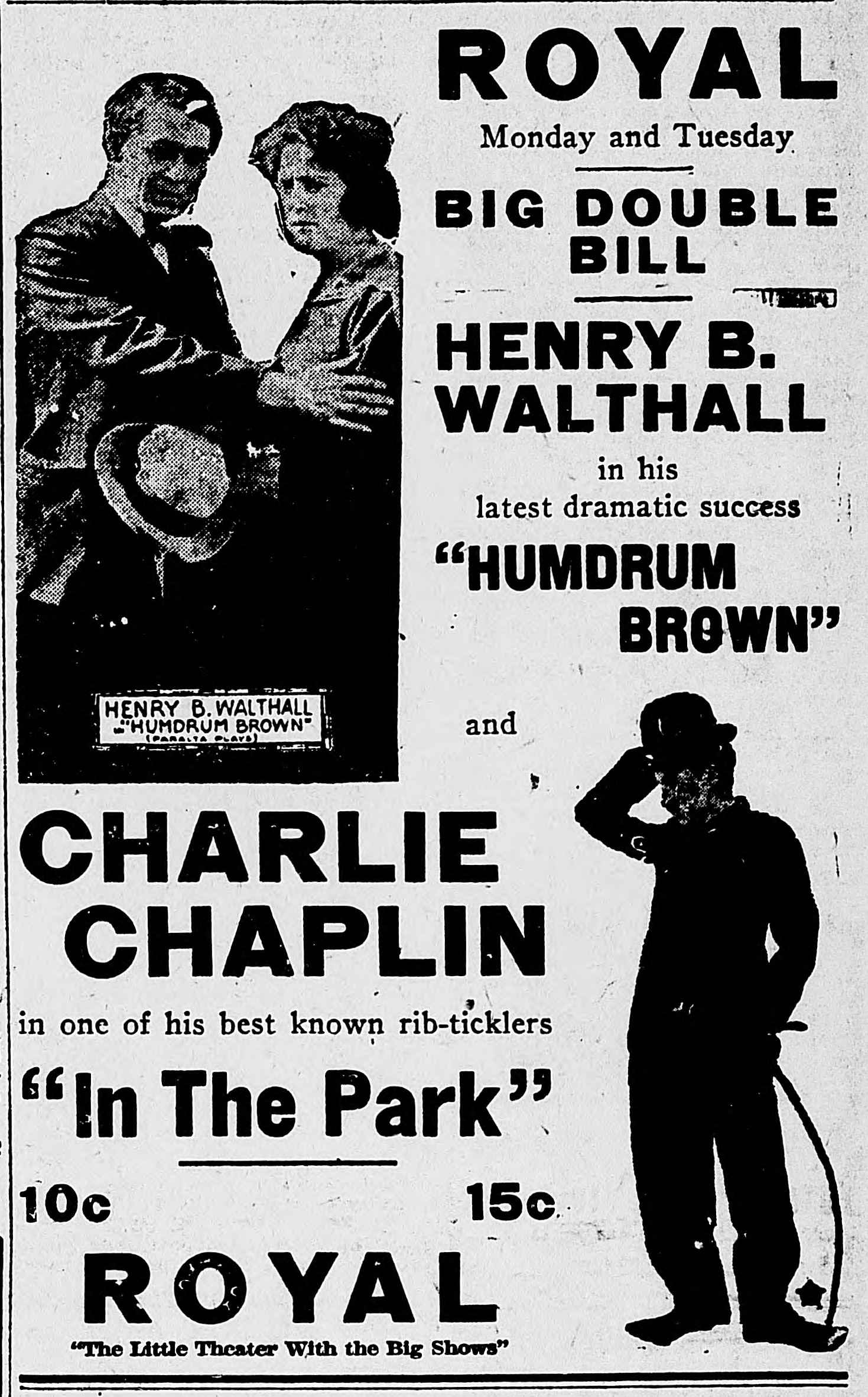
- Contemporary advertisement for the film and for the 1915 film In the Park
- Directed by: Rex Ingram
- Written by: H.B. Daniel; M.G. Daniel; R.B. Kidd
- Starring: Henry B. Walthall; Mary Charleson; Dorothy Clark
- Cinematography: Clyde Cook
- Production company: Paralta Plays
- Distributed by: W. W. Hodkinson Corporation
- Release date: March 15, 1918
- Running time: 60 minutes
- Country: United States
- Languages: Silent; English intertitles

Humdrum Brown is a 1918 American silent comedy drama film directed by Rex Ingram and starring Henry B. Walthall, Mary Charleson and Dorothy Clark.

== Cast ==
- Henry B. Walthall as Hector 'Humdrum' Brown
- Mary Charleson as Alicia Boothe
- Dorothy Clark as Grace Danforth
- Howard Crampton as Carlos Tanner
- Kate Price as Cousin Kate
- Joseph J. Dowling as John Fryeburg
- Joe Harris as Ed Danforth
- Ida Lewis as Aunt Elvira

== Bibliography ==
- Leonhard Gmür. Rex Ingram: Hollywood's Rebel of the Silver Screen. 2013.
