= The Trembling Hour =

1919 silent film

- Directed by: George Siegmann
- Written by: Kenneth B. Clarke; Doris Schroeder
- Starring: Helen Jerome Eddy; Kenneth Harlan; Henry A. Barrows
- Cinematography: Alfred Gosden
- Production company: Universal Pictures
- Distributed by: Universal Pictures
- Release date: November 1, 1919
- Running time: 60 minutes
- Country: United States
- Languages: Silent; English intertitles

The Trembling Hour is a 1919 American silent mystery film directed by George Siegmann and starring Helen Jerome Eddy, Kenneth Harlan and Henry A. Barrows.

== Cast ==
- Helen Jerome Eddy as Margy Webb
- Kenneth Harlan as Major Ralph Dunstan
- Henry A. Barrows as George Belding
- Willis Marks as Bull Barnes
- Clyde E. Hopkins as John Belding
- Edna Shipman as Alice Belding
- Gertrude Astor as Mrs. Byrnie
- Anna Mae Walthall as Pauline

== Bibliography ==
- Codori, Jeff. Film History Through Trade Journal Art, 1916-1920. McFarland, 2020.
