= With Hoops of Steel =

1918 film

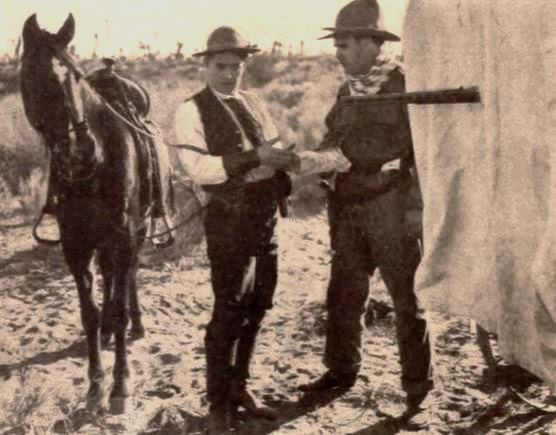
- Directed by: Eliot Howe
- Written by: Florence Finch Kelly (novel); Thomas J. Geraghty
- Produced by: Robert Brunton
- Starring: J. Warren Kerrigan; Lois Wilson; William Elmer
- Cinematography: Robert Newhard
- Production company: Paralta Plays
- Distributed by: Hodkinson Pictures
- Release date: April 29, 1918
- Running time: 50 minutes
- Country: United States
- Languages: Silent; English intertitles

With Hoops of Steel is a 1918 American silent Western film directed by Eliot Howe and starring Henry B. Walthall, William De Vaull and Mary Charleson.

== Cast ==
- Henry B. Walthall as Emerson Mead
- William De Vaull as Jim Harlin
- Mary Charleson as Marguerite Delance
- Joseph J. Dowling as Col. Whittaker
- Howard Crampton as Pierre Delarue
- Roy Laidlaw as Albert Wellesley
- Jack Standing as Paul Delarue
- Clifford Alexander as Will Whittaker
- Anna Mae Walthall as Amanda Garcia

== Bibliography ==
- Gmür, Leonhard, Rex Ingram: Hollywood's Rebel of the Silver Screen. 2013.
