= As Man Desires =

1925 film by Irving Cummings

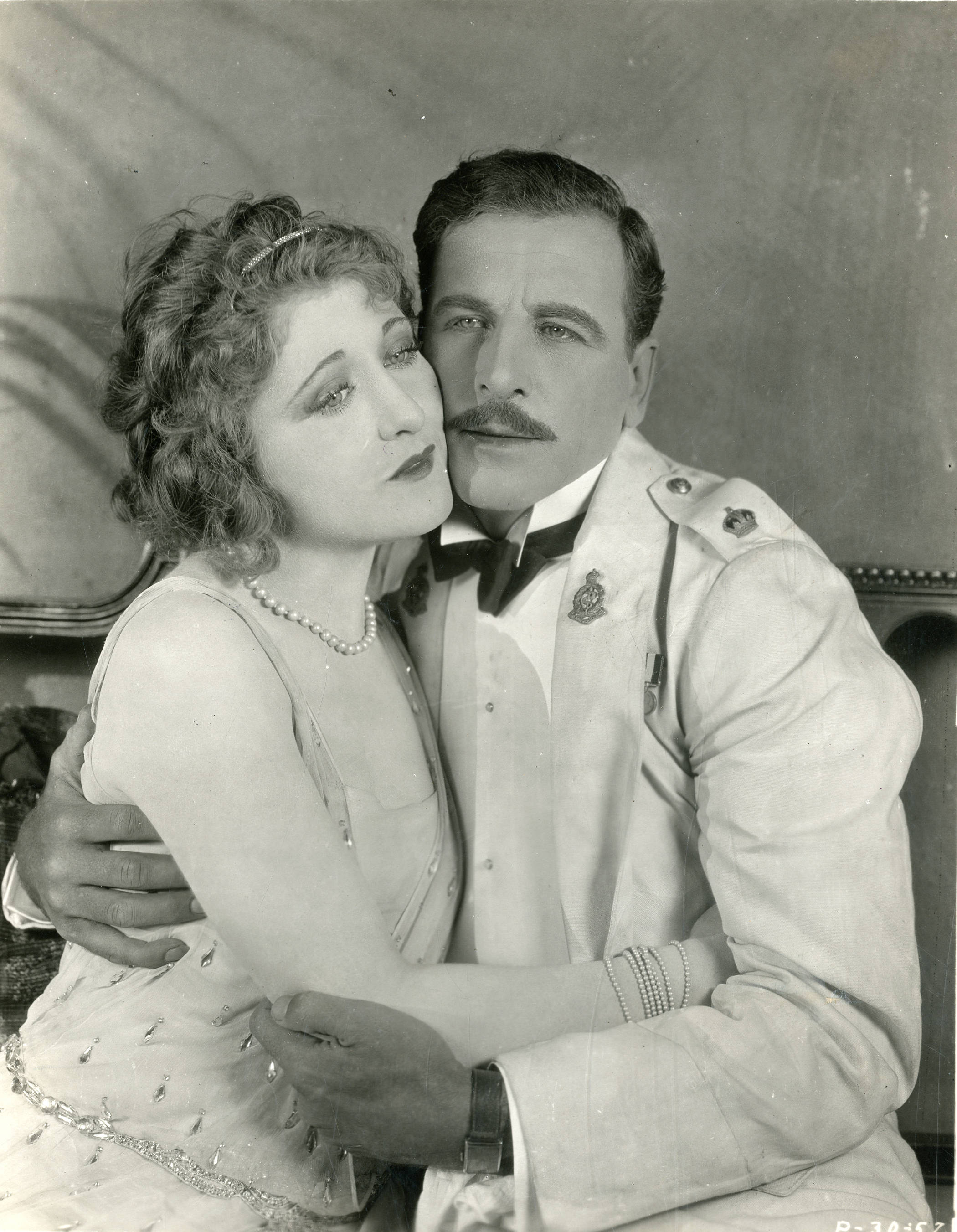
- Still with Clifford and Cummings
- Directed by: Irving Cummings
- Written by: Marion Orth (scenario); Earl Hudson (adaptation); Marion Fairfax
- Starring: Viola Dana; Milton Sills
- Cinematography: Roy Carpenter
- Edited by: Charles Hunt
- Production company: First National Pictures
- Distributed by: First National Pictures
- Release date: January 11, 1925
- Running time: 80 minutes; 8 reels (7,790 feet)
- Country: United States
- Language: Silent (English intertitles)

As Man Desires is a lost 1925 American silent drama film directed by Irving Cummings and starring Viola Dana. It was produced and distributed by First National Pictures.

== Plot ==
As described in a review in a film magazine, Major John Craig knocks out Colonel Carringford when he discovers Gloria Gordon, his fiancée, has been untrue. Carringford is then murdered by a servant and because Evelyn Beaudine, a married woman of unsavory reputation, accuses him of the crime, Craig is forced to flee from his British Army post in India. Craig procures a fishing smack and amasses wealth from working pearl beds in the South Seas. He tenders Gorilla Bagsley, a poacher a beating when he finds him annoying Pandora. She now feels that Craig is "her man" and, to spite the memory of the other woman, he marries her. A seaman identifies Craig and notifies the British government. Gloria comes with the representative who tells Craig that Gloria had sacrificed her own reputation to prove his innocence. Gorilla, intending to kill Craig, levels a gun towards his back but Pandora jumps in the way as it is fired. Craig and Gloria are thus united.

== Cast ==
- Milton Sills as Major John Craig
- Viola Dana as Pandora La Croix
- Ruth Clifford as Gloria Gordon
- Rosemary Theby as Evelyn Beaudine
- Irving Cummings as Major Singh
- Paul Nicholson as Colonel Carringford
- Tom Kennedy as Gorilla Bagsley
- Hector Sarno as Toni
- Louis Payne as Major Gridley
- Anna Mae Walthall as The Duchess
- Edneh Altemus as Camille
- Frank Leigh as Watkins
- Robert St. Angelo as Extra (uncredited)

== Preservation ==
With no prints of As Man Desires located in any film archives, it is a lost film.
