= Henry B. Walthall =

American actor (1878–1936)

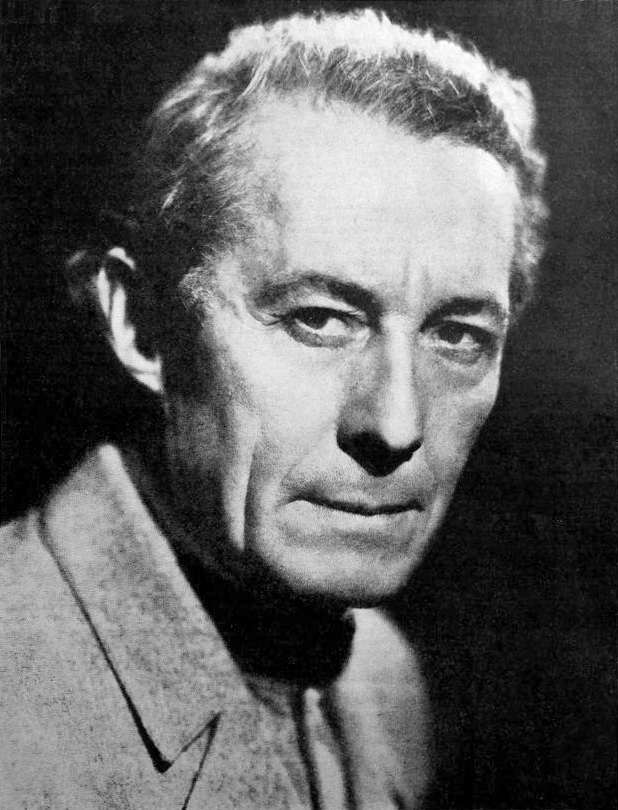
- Walthall in 1934
- Born: Henry Brazeale Walthall; March 16, 1878; Shelby County, Alabama, U.S.
- Died: June 17, 1936 (aged 58); Monrovia, California, U.S.
- Resting place: Hollywood Forever Cemetery
- Occupation: Actor
- Years active: 1901-1936
- Spouses: Isabel Fenton (m. 1904; div. 1918) Mary Charleson (m. 1918)
- Children: 1

Henry Brazeale Walthall (March 16, 1878 – June 17, 1936) was an American stage and film actor. He appeared as the Little Colonel in D. W. Griffith's The Birth of a Nation (1915).

== Early life ==
Henry Brazeale Walthall was born March 16, 1878, on a cotton plantation owned by his father in Shelby County, Alabama. His father Junius Leigh Walthall had been a captain in the Confederate States Army. His sister, Anna Mae Walthall (1894–1950) had a film career in the 1920s.

In 1898, during the Spanish–American War, he enlisted in the First Alabama Regiment. He contracted malaria while in camp in Jacksonville, Florida, and the war ended before he had recovered. He served 11 months, and when his regiment was discharged he returned home. Then, with $100, he left for New York to make his career on the stage. He played small parts with the Murray Hill Theater stock company. Later he became affiliated with the American Theater stock company and soon afterward joined the Providence, Rhode Island, stock company.

== Career ==
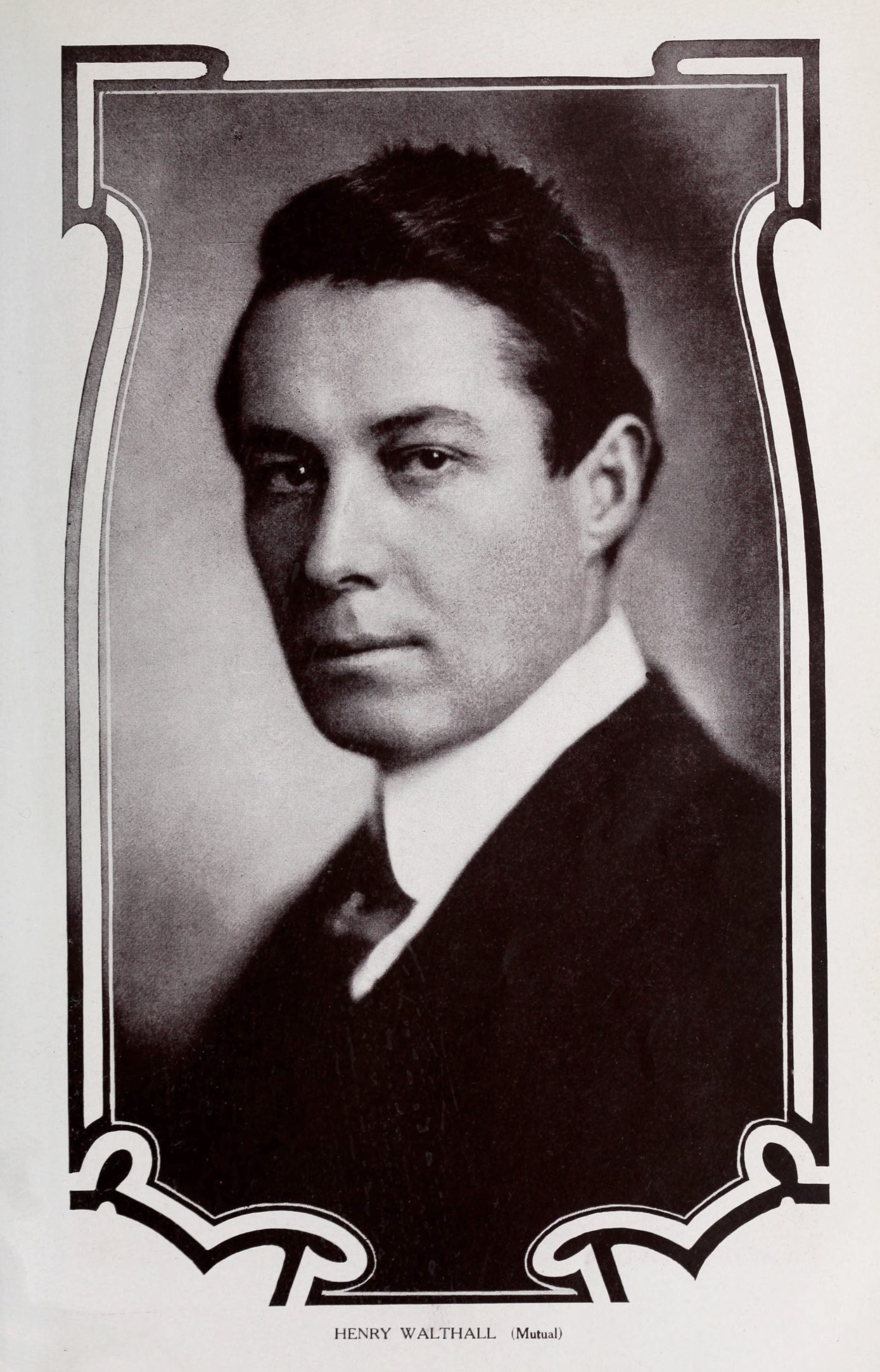
Walthall in 1914

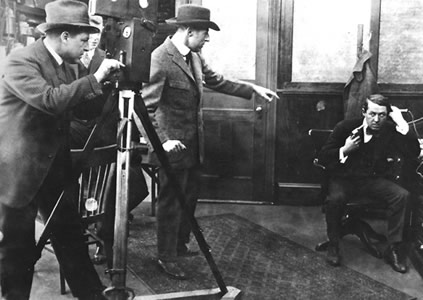
Filming The Escape in 1913

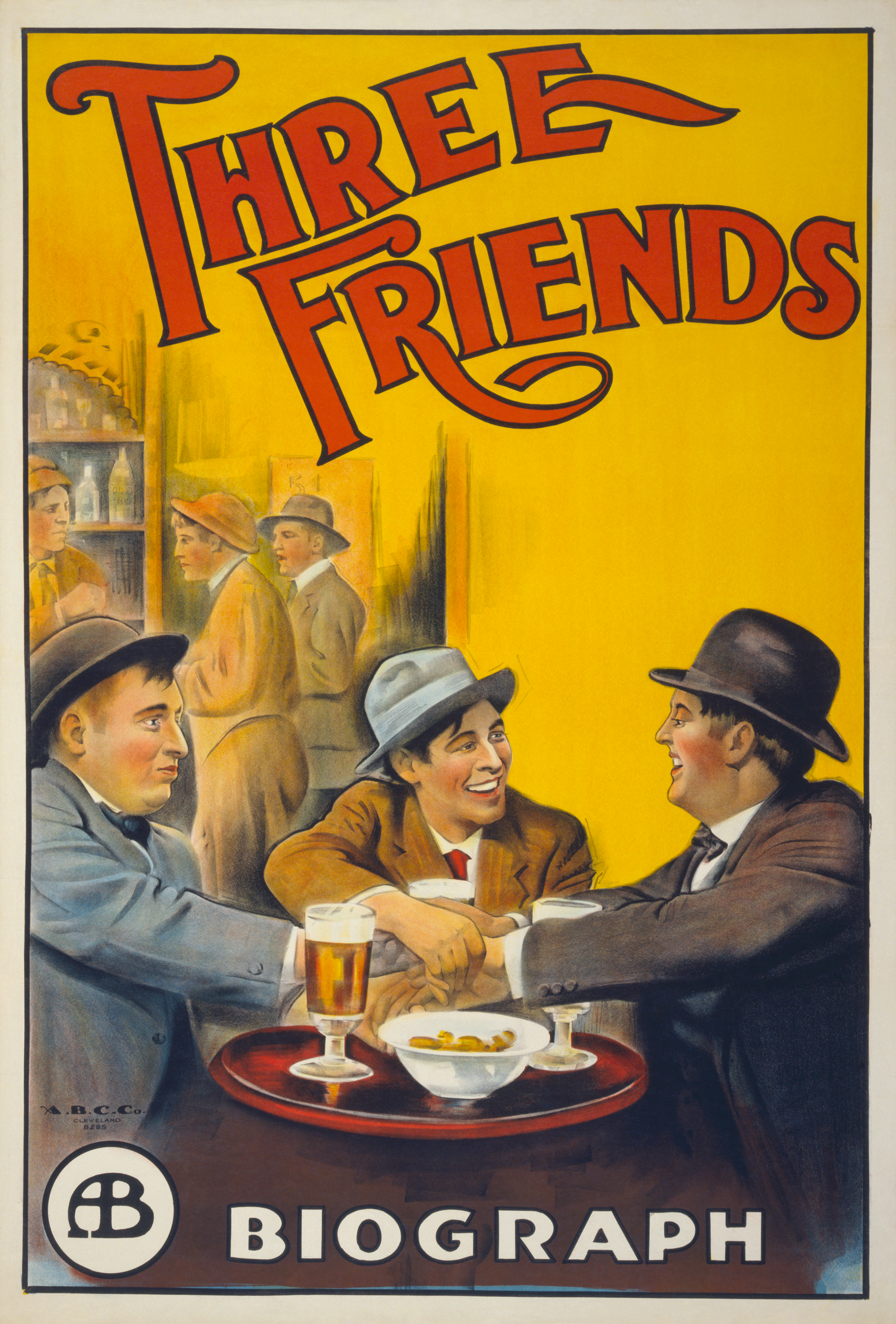
Three Friends (1913)

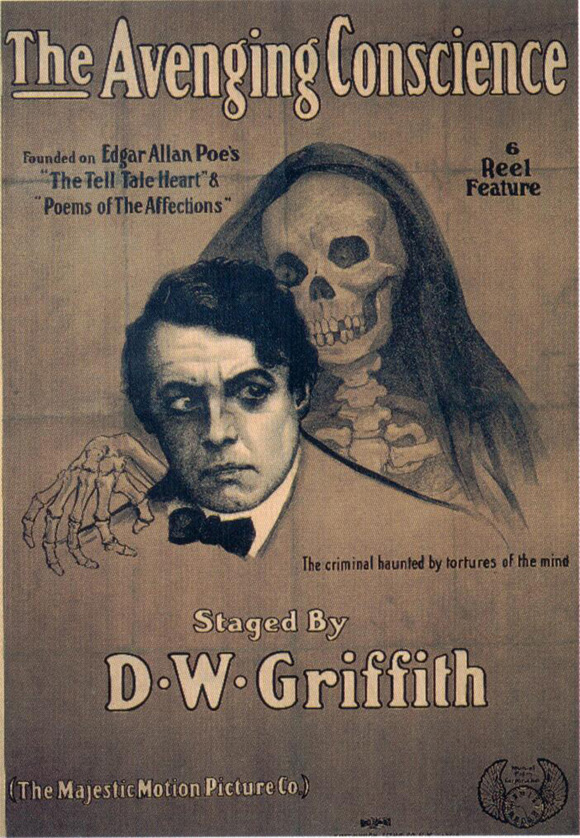
The Avenging Conscience (1914)

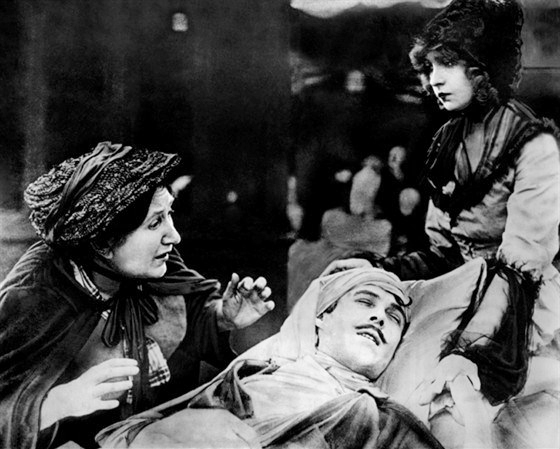
The Birth of a Nation (1915)

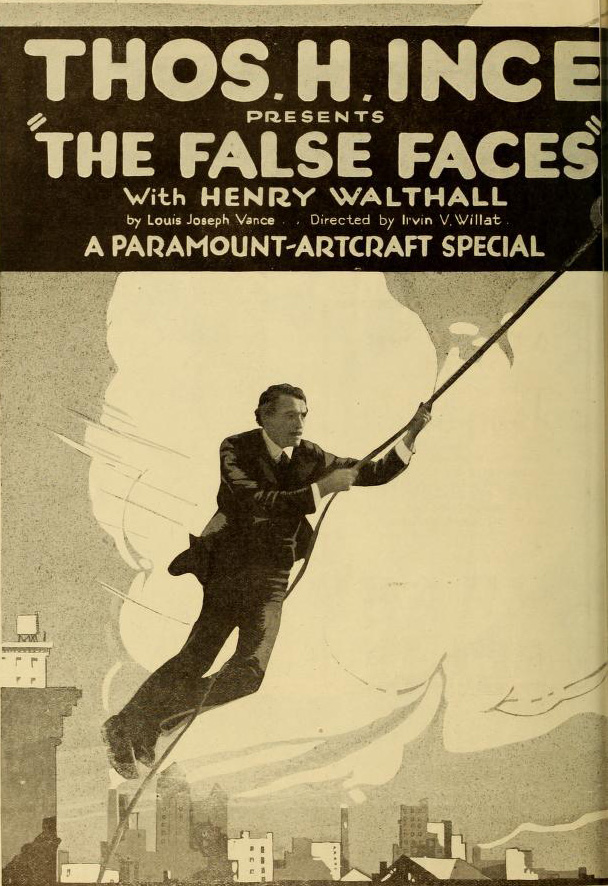
The False Faces (1919)

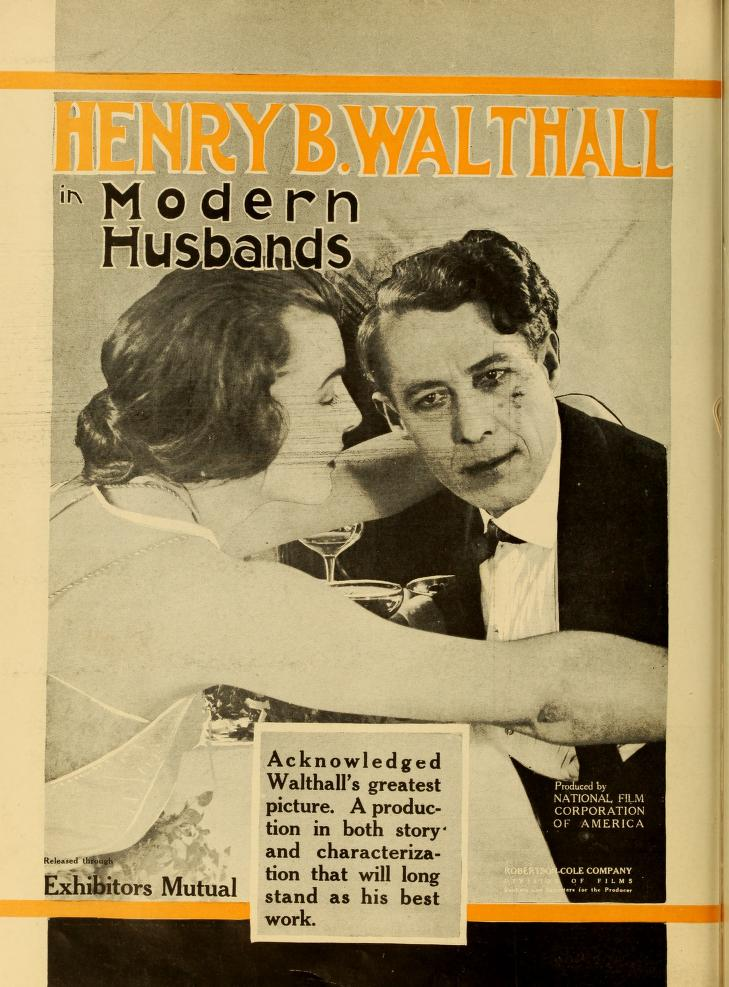
Modern Husbands (1919)

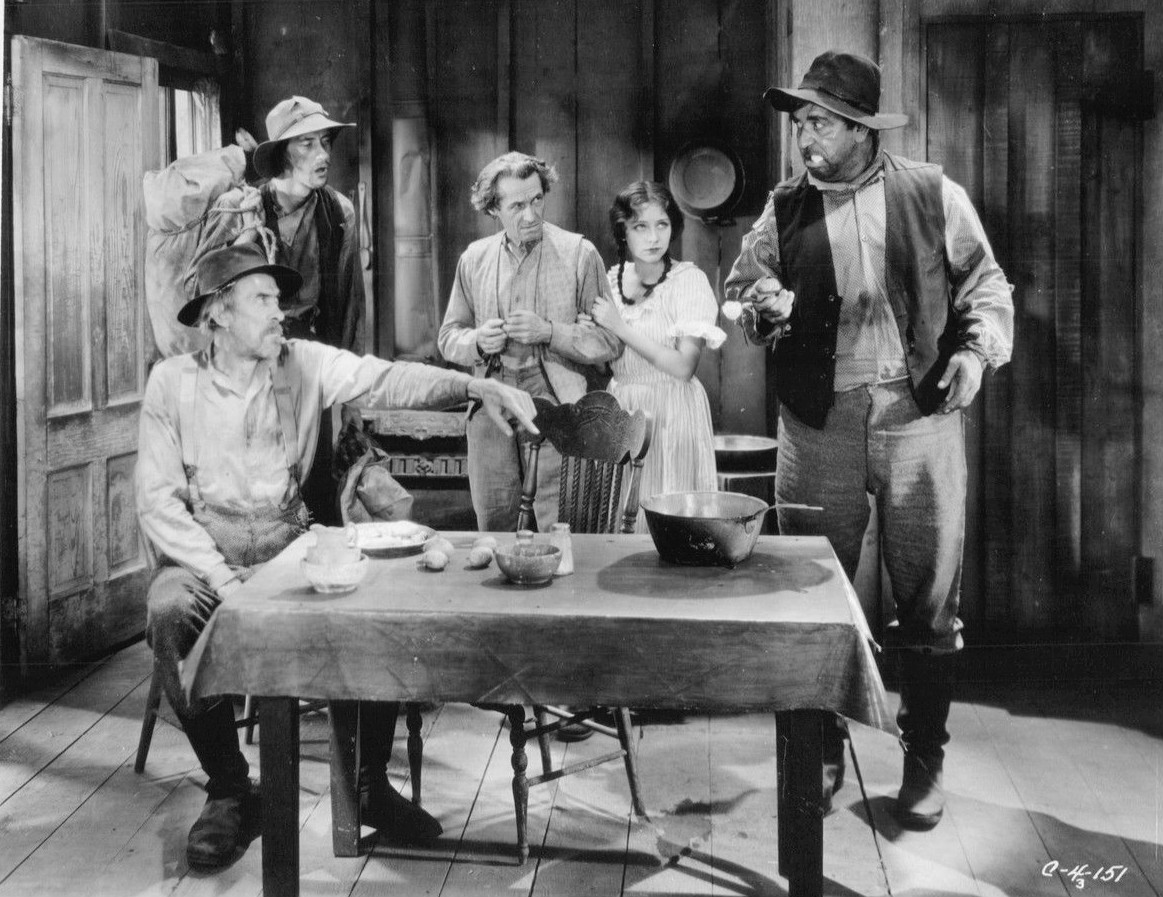
Still from Tol'able David showing (from left) Harlan E. Knight, Peter Richmond, Walthall, Joan Peers, Noah Beery (1930)

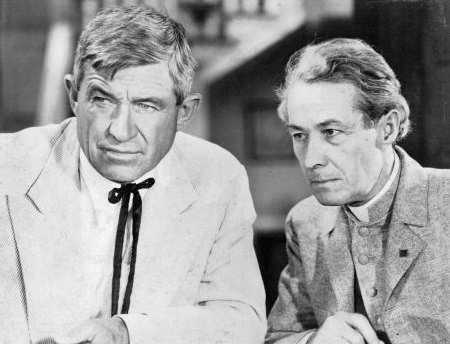
Will Rogers and Walthall in Judge Priest (1934)

In New York in 1901, Walthall won a role in Under Southern Skies by Charlotte Blair Parker. He performed in the play for three years, in New York and on tour. With the company of Henry Miller he gained recognition on Broadway in plays, including Pippa Passes, The Only Way and William Vaughn Moody's The Great Divide (1906–08). His fellow cast member James Kirkwood introduced Walthall to D. W. Griffith, and at the conclusion of that engagement, Walthall joined the Biograph Company.

His career in films began in 1909 at Biograph Studios in New York with a leading role in the film A Convict's Sacrifice. This film also featured James Kirkwood, and was directed by D.W. Griffith, a director that played a huge part in Walthall's rise to stardom. As the industry grew in size and popularity, Griffith emerged as a director, and Walthall found himself a mainstay of the Griffith company, frequently working with Griffith regulars such as Owen Moore, Lionel Barrymore, Harry Carey, Lillian and Dorothy Gish, Blanche Sweet, Mae Marsh, Bobby Harron and Jack and Mary Pickford. He followed Griffith's departure from New York's Biograph to California's Reliance-Majestic Studios in 1913. After a few months with Reliance, he joined Pathé for a short period.

He decided to go into the producing business and formed The Union Feature Film Company, the first to be devoted entirely to full-length films. The venture was not successful, however, and he again became associated with Griffith's company.

Given the relatively short length of films in the early years, Walthall frequently found himself cast in dozens of films each year. He gained national attention in 1915 for his role as Colonel Ben Cameron in Griffith's highly influential and controversial epic The Birth of a Nation. Walthall's portrayal of a Confederate veteran rounding up the Ku Klux Klan won him large-scale fame, and Walthall emerged as a leading actor in the years leading up to the 1920s.

Walthall continued working in films through the 1920s, appearing in The Plastic Age with Donald Keith, Gilbert Roland and Clara Bow. He portrayed Roger Chillingworth in Victor Sjöström's 1926 adaptation of The Scarlet Letter with Lillian Gish, a role he reprised in the 1934 film adaptation of the novel.

Walthall continued his career into the 1930s. After his performance in director John Ford's 1934 film Judge Priest starring Will Rogers, he enjoyed a golden period of his career. He portrayed Dr. Manette in A Tale of Two Cities (1935), starring Ronald Colman. In 1936, he appeared as Marcel in The Devil-Doll and as Captain Buchanan in the American Civil War drama Hearts in Bondage. He was gravely ill during his final film, China Clipper.

Frank Capra wanted Walthall to portray the High Lama in his 1937 film Lost Horizon. "Frail and failing, he died before we could test him," Capra wrote.

Walthall has a star on the Hollywood Walk of Fame located at 6201 Hollywood Boulevard.

== Personal life ==
Lillian Gish described Walthall as "a slight man, about five feet six, fine-boned, with the face of a poet and a dreamer." She recalled his patience while Griffith grappled with technical problems filming the epilogue of Home, Sweet Home (1914), a scene in which Gish, as an angel, lifts Walthall's character out of hell. "There was a long discussion while Walthall and I, encased in leather harness, hung on the guide wires. Wally, a true southern gentleman, didn't raise his voice, didn't complain; he simply fainted and hung there limply."

Walthall was married twice. His mistress and a co-star Mary Charleson gave birth to Henry Walthall's baby, Mary Patricia in March 16, 1918. In November 15, 1918, Henry Walthall received the divorce decree from his wife Isabel Fenton (Isabella Hannigan) in Chicago, Illinois. Illinois law required a divorced person to wait one year to marry again, so Walthall fled to Indiana, and there he married Mary Charleson, in November 20, 1918. This marriage lasted from 1918 until his death in 1936.

Exhausted from months of uninterrupted film work, Walthall collapsed on the Warner Bros. set after completing his scenes in the film China Clipper, in which he portrayed an airplane inventor. He entered the Pasteur Sanitarium at Monrovia, California, and died of an intestinal illness three weeks later on June 17, 1936.

== Filmography ==
Year	Title	Role	Notes
1908	Rescued from an Eagle's Nest	Woodsman	Short
1909	A Convict's Sacrifice	The Convict's Friend	Short
1909	The Mended Lute	Indian	Short
1909	Pranks	Sunbather	Short
1909	The Sealed Room	The Minstrel	Short
1909	In Old Kentucky	Robert, the Confederate Son	Short
1909	The Hessian Renegades		Short
1909	A Corner in Wheat	The wheat king's assistant	Short
1909	Fools of Fate		Short
1909	A Trap for Santa Claus	Arthur	Short
1909	In Little Italy	Victor	Short
1909	The Day After	Party Guest	Short
1909	Choosing a Husband	Harry	Short; Lost film
1909	Getting Even	Miner	Short
1910	The Honor of His Family	George Pickett Jr.	Short; Lost film
1910	In Old California	Perdita's Son	Short; Lost film
1910	The Two Brothers	Pedro	Short; Lost film
1910	The Kid	Walter Holden	Short; Lost film
1910	The Gold Seekers	The Prospector	Short; Lost film
1910	Ramona	Alessandro	Short
1910	In the Border States	Confederate Corporal	Short, Uncredited
1910	The House with Closed Shutters	The Confederate Soldier	Short
1910	The Sorrows of the Unfaithful	Bill	Short
1910	A Summer Idyl	Albert	Short; Lost film
1910	The Oath and the Man	Henri Prevost	Short
1910	Rose O'Salem-Town	The Trapper	Short
1910	The Armorer's Daughter		Short; Lost film
1911	A Little Child	The Burglar	Short; Lost film
1912	The Miser's Daughter	The Miser's Daughter's Sweetheart	Short; Lost film
1912	Home Folks		Short
1912	The Inner Circle		Short
1912	A Change of Spirit	First Gentleman Thief	Short; Lost film
1912	Two Daughters of Eve	The Father	Short
1912	Friends	Dandy Jack	Short
1912	So Near, Yet So Far		Short
1912	A Feud in the Kentucky Hills	Psalm Singer	Short
1912	In the Aisles of the Wild	Jim Watson	Short; Lost film
1912	The One She Loved	The Husband	Short
1912	The Painted Lady	At Ice Cream Festival	Short, Uncredited
1912	My Baby	The Husband	Short
1912	The Informer	The false Brother	Short
1912	Brutality	In Play	Short
1912	My Hero	Indian Charlie	Short; Lost film
1912	The Burglar's Dilemma	Householder's Weakling Brother	Short
1912	The God Within	The Woodsman	Short
1913	Three Friends	Ned Billings - the Husband	Short; Lost film
1913	Oil and Water	The Idealist	Short
1913	Love in an Apartment Hotel	The Young Woman's Fiancé	Short; Lost film
1913	Broken Ways	The Road Agent	Short
1913	The Sheriff's Baby	First Bandit	Short; Lost film
1913	The Perfidy of Mary	Poet	Short
1913	The Lady and the Mouse	The 1st Rival	Short
1913	If We Only Knew	The Father	Short; Lost film
1913	The Wanderer	The Wanderer	Short
1913	The Tenderfoot's Money	The Prospector	Short; Lost film
1913	The Stolen Loaf	The Poor Man	Short; Lost film
1913	The House of Darkness	Minor Role	Short
1913	Red Hicks Defies the World	In Crowd	Short; Lost film
1913	Death's Marathon	The Husband	Short
1913	The Switch Tower	The Switchman	Short
1913	The Mothering Heart	Club Patron	Short, Uncredited
1913	The Mistake	Jack, the Friend, a Prospector	Short; Lost film
1913	A Gambler's Honor	Beth's Brother	Short; Lost film
1913	During the Round-Up	The Stranger	Short; Lost film
1913	The Mirror	The Station Agent	Short; Lost film
1913	The Vengeance of Galora		Short; Lost film
1913	Two Men of the Desert	First Partner	Short; Lost film
1913	A Woman in the Ultimate	Member of the Badger Gang	Short; Lost film
1913	The Wedding Gown		
1913	The Battle at Elderbush Gulch	Indian Chief's Son	Short
1913	The Little Tease	The Valley Man	
1914	Classmates	Duncan Irving	Short
1914	The Green-Eyed Devil		Short; Lost film
1914	The Gangsters of New York	Porky Dugan	Short; Lost film
1914	Judith of Bethulia	Holofernes	
1914	Strongheart	Soangataha / Strongheart	Short, Lost film
1914	The Floor Above	Stephen Pryde	Short; Lost film
1914	Ashes of the Past		Lost film
1914	Home, Sweet Home	John Howard Payne	
1914	The Mountain Rat	Douglas Williams	Short; Lost film
1914	Lord Chumley	Lord Chumley	Short
1914	Man's Enemy		Short
1914	The Avenging Conscience	The Nephew	
1914	The Odalisque	Joe, in love with May	Short; Lost film
1915	The Birth of a Nation	Col. Benjamin Cameron	
1915	Beulah	Dr. Guy Hartwell	Lost film
1915	Ghosts	Captain Arling / Oswald	
1915	The Raven	Edgar Allan Poe	
1915	The Woman Hater		Lost film
1916	The Misleading Lady	Jack Craigen	Lost film
1916	The Strange Case of Mary Page	Phil Langdon, Attorney	Serial; Lost film
1916	The Birth of a Man		Lost film
1916	The Sting of Victory	David Whiting/Walker Whiting	Lost film
1916	The Pillars of Society	Karsten Bernick	Lost film
1916	The Truant Soul	Dr. John Lancaster / Dr. Lawson	Lost film
1917	Little Shoes	David Noel	Lost film
1917	Burning the Candle	James Maxwell	Lost film
1917	The Saint's Adventure	Rev. Paul Manson	Lost film
1917	National Association's All-Star Picture		Lost film
1918	His Robe of Honor	Julian Randolph	Lost film
1918	Humdrum Brown	Hector "Humdrum" Brown	
1918	With Hoops of Steel	Emerson Mead	Lost film
1918	The Great Love	Sir Roger Brighton	Lost film
1918	And a Still Small Voice	Clay Randolph	Lost film
1919	The Long Lane's Turning	Harry Sevier	
1919	The False Faces	Michael Lanyard, "The Lone Wolf"	
1919	Modern Husbands	Stephen Duane	Lost film
1919	The Boomerang	George Gray	
1919	The Long Arm of Mannister	George Mannister	Lost film
1920	The Confession	Father Bartlett	
1920	Parted Curtains	Joe Jenkins	Lost film
1920	A Splendid Hazard	Karl Breitman	Lost film
1921	Flower of the North	Philip Whittemore	
1922	The Ableminded Lady	Breezy Bright	Lost film
1922	One Clear Call	Henry Garnett	
1922	The Kickback	Aaron Price	Lost film
1922	The Long Chance	Harley P. Hennage	Lost film
1922	The Marriage Chance	Dr. Paul Graydon	Lost film
1923	The Face on the Bar-Room Floor	Robert Stevens	Lost film
1923	Gimme	John McGimsey	Lost film
1923	The Unknown Purple	Peter Marchmont / Victor Cromport	Lost film
1923	Boy of Mine	William Latimer	Lost film
1924	The Woman on the Jury	Prosecuting Attorney	Lost film
1924	Single Wives	Franklin Dexter	
1924	The Bowery Bishop	Norman Strong	Lost film
1925	The Golden Bed	Colonel Peake	
1925	On the Threshold	Andrew Masters	
1925	The Girl Who Wouldn't Work	William Hale	
1925	Kit Carson Over the Great Divide	Dr. Samuel Webb	
1925	Kentucky Pride	Mr. Beaumont	
1925	Dollar Down	Alec Craig	
1925	Simon the Jester	Brandt	Lost film
1925	The Plastic Age	Henry Carver	
1926	Three Faces East	George Bennett	
1926	The Barrier	Gale Gaylord	Lost film
1926	The Unknown Soldier	Mr. Phillips	
1926	The Road to Mandalay	Father James	
1926	The Scarlet Letter	Roger Chillingworth	
1926	Everybody's Acting	Thorpe	Lost film
1927	Fighting Love	Filipo Navarro	
1927	The Enchanted Island	Tim Sanborn	Lost film
1927	Wings	Mr. Armstrong	
1927	The Rose of Kildare	Bob Avery	Lost film
1927	Love Me and the World Is Mine	Van Denbosch	
1927	A Light in the Window	Johann Graff	Lost film
1927	London After Midnight	Sir James Hamlin	Lost film
1928	Retribution	Henry / Tommy Mooney	Short, Vitaphone Varieties 2418
1928	Freedom of the Press	John Ballard	Lost film
1929	The Jazz Age	Mr. Maxwell	
1929	Stark Mad	Captain Rhodes	Lost film
1929	Speakeasy	Fuzzy	Lost film
1929	The Bridge of San Luis Rey	Father Juniper	
1929	From Headquarters	Buffalo Bill Ryan	Lost film
1929	River of Romance	Gen. Jeff Rumford	
1929	Black Magic	Dr. Bradbroke	Lost film
1929	Street Corner		Short
1929	In Old California	Don Pedro DeLeón	
1929	The Phantom in the House	Boyd Milburn	
1929	The Trespasser	Fuller	
1930	Blaze o' Glory	Burke	Lost film
1930	Temple Tower	Blackton	
1930	Abraham Lincoln	Colonel Marshall	
1930	The Love Trader	Captain Adams	
1930	Tol'able David	Amos Hatburn	
1931	Is There Justice?	District Attorney John Raymond	Lost film
1931	Anybody's Blonde	Mr. Evans	
1932	Police Court	Nat Barry	
1932	Hotel Continental	Winthrop	
1932	Strange Interlude	Professor Leeds	
1932	Alias Mary Smith	Atwell	
1932	Chandu the Magician	Robert Regent	
1932	Ride Him, Cowboy	John Gaunt	
1932	Klondike	Mark Armstrong	
1932	The Cabin in the Cotton	Eph Clinton	
1932	Me and My Gal	Sarge	
1932	Central Park	Eby	
1932	Self Defense	Dr. Borden	
1933	42nd Street	The Actor	Uncredited
1933	The Whispering Shadow	J.D. Bradley - Company President	Serial
1933	The Flaming Signal	Rev. James	
1933	Somewhere in Sonora	Bob Leadly	
1933	Hold Your Man	Clergyman in Alternate Version	Uncredited
1933	Laughing at Life	Presidente Valenzuela	
1933	Headline Shooter	Judge Beacon	Uncredited
1933	Her Forgotten Past	Mr. Maynard	
1933	The Wolf Dog	Jim Courtney	Serial
1933	The Sin of Nora Moran	Father Ryan	
1934	Dark Hazard	Schultz	Uncredited
1934	Beggars in Ermine	Marchant the Blind Man	
1934	Men in White	Dr. McCabe	
1934	Viva Villa!	Francisco I. Madero	
1934	City Park	Colonel Henry Randolph Ransome	
1934	The Murder in the Museum	Bernard Latham Wayne, alias Professor Mysto	
1934	Judge Priest	Rev. Ashby Brand	
1934	The Scarlet Letter	Roger Chillingworth	
1934	The Lemon Drop Kid	Jonas Deering	
1934	A Girl of the Limberlost	Dr. Ammon	
1934	Love Time	Duke Johann von Hatzfeld	
1934	Bachelor of Arts	Professor Barth	
1935	Helldorado	Abner Meadows	
1935	Dante's Inferno	Pop McWade	
1935	A Tale of Two Cities	Dr. Manette	
1936	The Garden Murder Case	Dr. Garden	
1936	The Mine with the Iron Door	David Burton	
1936	Hearts in Bondage	Captain Buchanan	
1936	The Last Outlaw	Under Sheriff Calvin Yates	Screening on Broadway when Walthall died
1936	The Devil-Doll	Marcel	
1936	China Clipper	Dad Brunn	Walthall collapsed on the set after completing his scenes and died three weeks later (final film role)
