= Frances Raymond =

American actress (1869–1961)

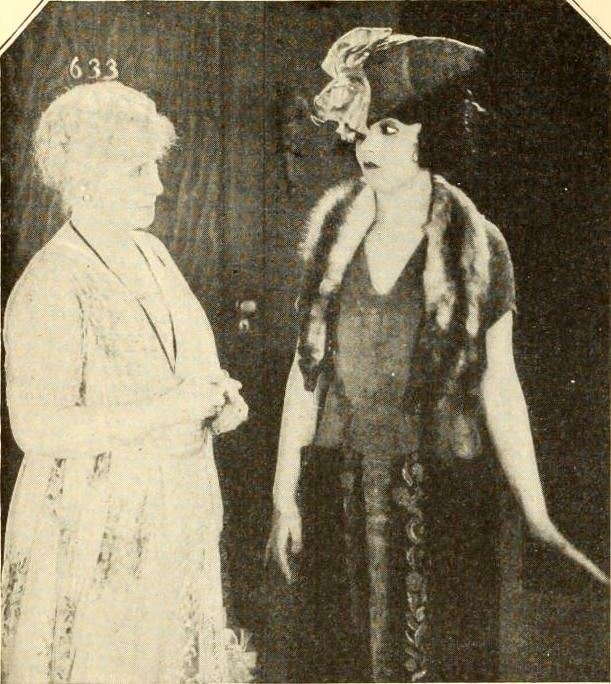
- Raymond (left) with Bebe Daniels in Two Weeks with Pay (1921)
- Born: May 24, 1869; Salem, Massachusetts, United States
- Died: June 18, 1961 (aged 92); Los Angeles, California, United States
- Occupation: Actress
- Years active: 1915–1947 (film)

Frances Raymond (1869–1961) was an American stage and film actress. An established character actress, she played in a number of supporting roles during the silent era. Later, during the sound era, she primarily played much smaller, uncredited parts.

== Selected filmography ==
- The Strange Case of Mary Page (1916)
- The Misleading Lady (1916)
- Skinner's Dress Suit (1917)
- Burning the Candle (1917)
- Sadie Goes to Heaven (1917)
- Love Insurance (1919)
- The Other Half (1919)
- Miss Hobbs (1920)
- A Light Woman (1920)
- The Best of Luck (1920)
- Smoldering Embers (1920)
- A Lady in Love (1920)
- The Midlanders (1920)
- The City of Masks (1920)
- Li Ting Lang (1920)
- The March Hare (1921)
- One a Minute (1921)
- Garments of Truth (1921)
- Two Weeks with Pay (1921)
- One Wild Week (1921)
- Hurricane's Gal (1922)
- Shadows (1922)
- The Ghost Breaker (1922)
- A Chapter in Her Life (1923)
- The Grail (1923)
- Money, Money, Money (1923)
- The Meanest Man in the World (1923)
- Flirting with Love (1924)
- Girls Men Forget (1924)
- Abraham Lincoln (1924)
- Excitement (1924)
- California Straight Ahead (1925)
- Scandal Proof (1925)
- Satan in Sables (1925)
- Seven Chances (1925)
- The Girl on the Stairs (1925)
- What Happened to Jones (1926)
- Behind the Front (1926)
- Stage Kisses (1927)
- The Cruel Truth (1927)
- Get Your Man (1927)
- The Wreck (1927)
- Rich Men's Sons (1927)
- The Gay Defender (1927)
- Web of Fate (1927)
- The Gay Old Bird (1927)
- Wandering Girls (1927)
- Illusion (1929)
- Everything's Rosie (1931)
- Morning Glory (1933)
- The Mighty Barnum (1934)
- College Scandal (1935)
- Champagne Waltz (1937)
- You Can't Take It with You (1938)
- The Star Maker (1939)
- The Great Victor Herbert (1939)
- Cafe Society (1939)
- West Point Widow (1941)
- The Lady Eve (1941)
- Life with Henry (1941)
- Loco Boy Makes Good (1942)
- Happy Go Lucky (1943)
- You Came Along (1945)
- Our Hearts Were Growing Up (1946)
- Ladies' Man (1947)

== Bibliography ==
- Goble, Alan. The Complete Index to Literary Sources in Film. Walter de Gruyter, 1999.
