= Three Friends (1913 film) =

1913 film

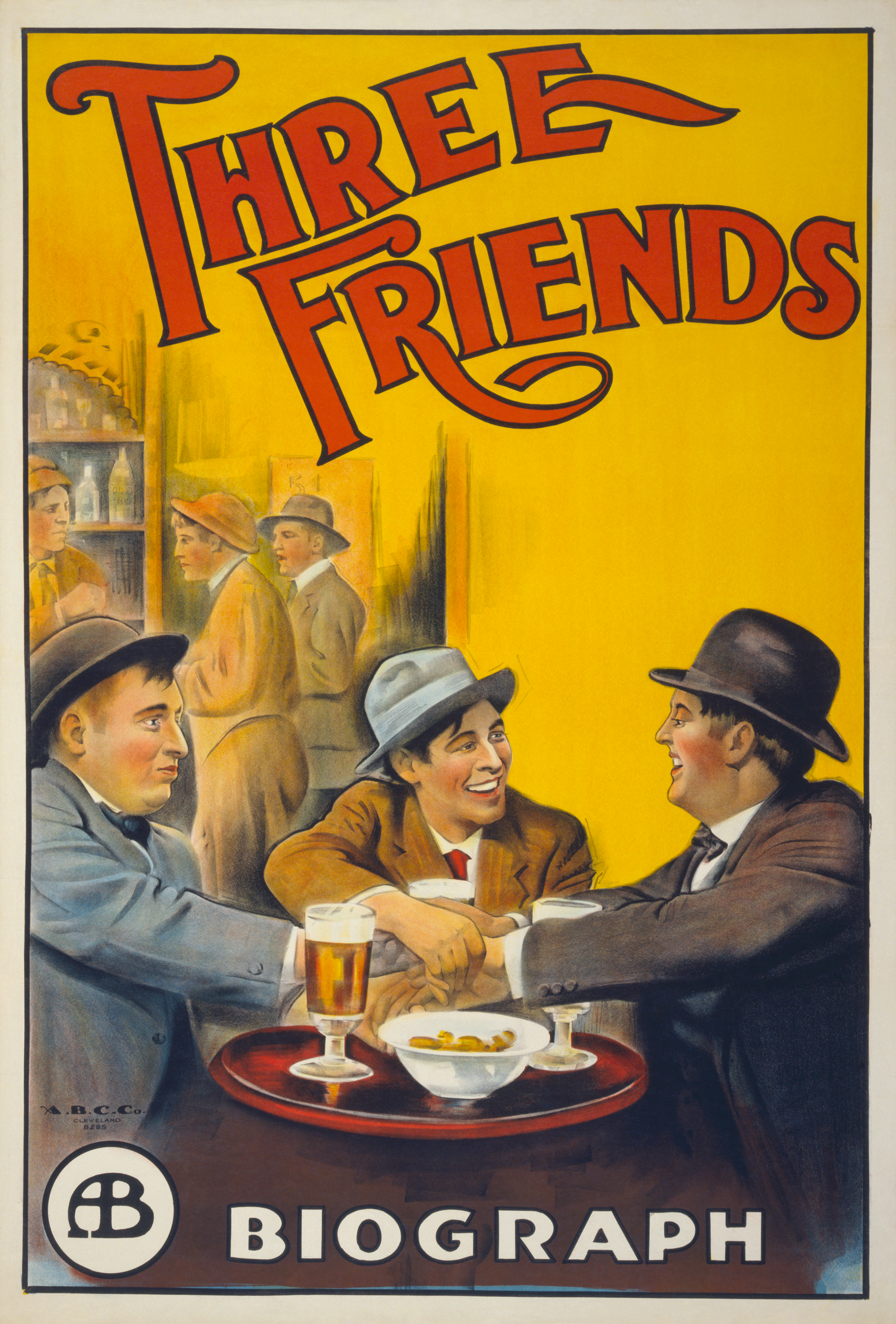
- Poster
- Directed by: D. W. Griffith
- Written by: M. S. Reardon
- Produced by: American Mutoscope and Biograph Company
- Starring: Blanche Sweet; Henry B. Walthall
- Cinematography: G. W. Bitzer
- Distributed by: General Film Company
- Release date: January 2, 1913
- Running time: 17 minutes (16 frame/s)
- Country: United States
- Language: Silent (English intertitles)

Three Friends is a 1913 American short silent Western film directed by D. W. Griffith and starring Blanche Sweet.

== Cast ==
- Henry B. Walthall as The Husband
- Blanche Sweet as The Wife
- John T. Dillon as First Friend
- Lionel Barrymore as Second Friend
- Joseph McDermott as Third Friend
- Clara T. Bracy as In First Factory
- Kathleen Butler as In First Factory
- Harry Carey as In Saloon and In First Factory
- Frank Evans as In First Factory
- J. Jiquel Lanoe as In First Factory
- Walter P. Lewis as Foreman
- Wilfred Lucas as In Second Factory
- Mae Marsh as The Wife's Friend
- W. C. Robinson as In Saloon
- J. Waltham as In Second Factory
