= An Awful Moment =

1908 film directed by D. W. Griffith

- Directed by: D. W. Griffith
- Written by: D. W. Griffith
- Starring: George Gebhardt
- Cinematography: Arthur Marvin
- Release date: December 18, 1908
- Running time: Original duration 12 minutes (one reel)
- Country: United States
- Language: Silent

Play film; runtime 00:08:03

An Awful Moment is a 1908 American silent short drama film directed by D. W. Griffith. A print of the "one-reeler" is preserved in the film archive of the Library of Congress.

== Plot ==
Judge Mowbray sentences a man, at which a gypsy woman protests. The Judge later goes home and sees his wife and daughter. However the gypsy woman breaks into his house. She knocks out Mrs. Mowbray, gags her and ties her to a chair. She sets up a gun to shoot her dead when the door is opened. However the daughter wakes up and is able to tell her father, who saves his wife, and the gypsy woman is arrested.

== Cast ==
- George Gebhardt as Matteo Rettazzi / Policeman
- Marion Leonard as Fiammetta, Matteo's Wife
- Harry Solter as Judge Mowbray
- Florence Lawrence as Mrs. Mowbray
- Gladys Egan as The Mowbrays' Daughter
- Linda Arvidson as The Maid
- Florence Barker
- Dorothy Bernard
- Kate Bruce
- Charles Gorman
- Gertrude Robinson as Woman in Court
- Mack Sennett as Policeman / Man in Court
- Dorothy West
