= The Hole in the Wall (1921 film) =

1921 film

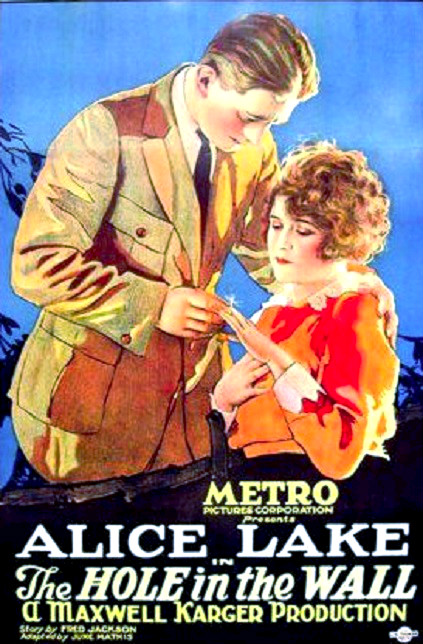
- Film poster
- Directed by: Maxwell Karger
- Written by: Maxwell Karger (scenario)
- Based on: The Hole in the Wall by Fred Jackson
- Produced by: Maxwell Karger
- Starring: Alice Lake; Allan Forrest
- Cinematography: Allen Siegler
- Production company: Metro Pictures
- Distributed by: Metro Pictures
- Release date: December 12, 1921
- Running time: 6 reels (6,100 feet)
- Country: United States
- Language: Silent (English intertitles)

The Hole in the Wall is a 1921 American silent drama film produced and distributed by Metro Pictures and directed and co-produced by Maxwell Karger. The film starred Alice Lake and is based on a Broadway play, The Hole in the Wall by Fred Jackson.

The later 1929 film The Hole in the Wall was an early talkie remake starring Edward G. Robinson and Claudette Colbert.

== Plot ==
As described in a film magazine, Jean Oliver (Lake) is a young woman who has been wronged by a wealthy lady and seeks her revenge. She becomes a seeress, posing as Madam Mysteria, a medium who has been killed in an accident. Through a band of crooks she determines to avenge herself on Mrs. Ramsey (Lester), who was instrumental in sending Jean to prison. Gordon Grant (Forrest), a reporter, comes to the medium's parlor with a woman who is posing as his aunt. He is attempting to solve the kidnapping of Mrs. Ramsey's young grandchild, and while he is there the police raid the place and arrest the crooks. The leader of the gang escape with the baby, however, and demands the release of the gang before he will give the child up. He also asks that Mrs. Ramsey acknowledge that she lied and that Jean is innocent of any wrongdoing, which she does. The film ends with a happy ending as Jean and Gordon are reunited.

The film's title is based upon a scene in which the medium, while in a trance, tells the reporter's lady friend some amazing truths and these truths are graphically presented by having the walls of the parlor crumble and figures crying for recognition appear in the distance.

== Cast ==
- Alice Lake as Jean Oliver
- Allan Forrest as Gordon Grant
- Frank Brownlee as Limpy Jim
- Charles Clary as The Fox
- William De Vaull as Deagon
- Kate Lester as Mrs. Ramsey
- Carl Gerard as Donald Ramsey
- John Ince as Inspector of Police
- Claire Du Brey as Cora Thompson

== Preservation status ==
This film is now considered a lost film.
