= William De Vaull =

American actor

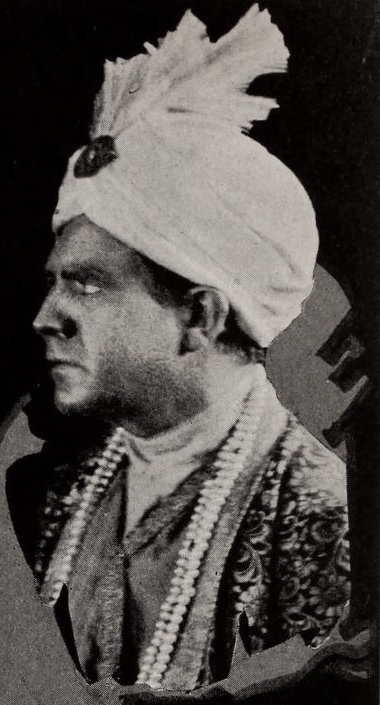
- William De Vaull as depicted on an advertisement for the 1921 film The Hole in the Wall
- Born: December 12, 1870; San Francisco, California, U.S.
- Died: June 4, 1945 (aged 74); Hollywood, California, U.S.
- Other name: William P. DeVaull
- Occupation: Actor
- Years active: 1915–1927

William De Vaull (December 12, 1870 – June 4, 1945) - also credited as William P. DeVaull - was an American film actor. He appeared in more than thirty films from 1915 to 1927. In 1919 he sued the Shipman-Curwood Company for nonpayment of $400 (approximately $35,000 in 2026). He portaryed a Black character, Jake, in the D. W. Griffith film The Birth of a Nation.

== Filmography ==
Film
Year	Title	Role	Notes
1915	The Birth of a Nation	Nelse (aka Jake)	Uncredited
1916	An Innocent Magdalene	Old Joe	
1916	Diane of the Follies	the butler	
1916	Big Tremaine	John Nolan	
1917	The Haunted Pajamas	Colonel Kirkland	
1918	Treasure of the Sea	Harris	
1918	With Hoops of Steel	Jim Harlin	
1919	Life's a Funny Proposition	Jiggs	
1919	The Long Lane's Turning	Jubilee	
1919	What Every Woman Wants	Norman	
1919	The Shepherd of the Hills	Doctor	
1919	Better Times	Si Whittaker	(as William De Vaulle)
1919	Dangerous Waters	Judson	
1919	Poor Relations	Pa Perkins	(as William Du Vaull)
1919	Blind Husbands	a man from home	
1919	The Prince and Betty	Crump	
1920	Girls Don't Gamble	Mr. Cassidy	
1921	Trailin'	Deputy Glendon	Uncredited
1921	The Hole in the Wall	Deagon	
1922	Bing Bang Boom	The Mayor	
1922	In the Days of Buffalo Bill	Edwin M. Stanton	(as William P. DeVaul)
1922	White Shoulders	Uncle Enoch	
1923	Around the World in Eighteen Days	Jiggs	as William P. DeVaul
1923	Tea: With a Kick!	Napoleon	
1923	Kentucky Days	Scipio	
1925	Ace of Spades	Napoleon Bonaparte	Serial, (as William P. DeVaul)
1925	Lights of Old Broadway	De Rhonde's Butler	
1927	In the First Degree	Butler	(final film role)
