= One a Minute =

1921 film

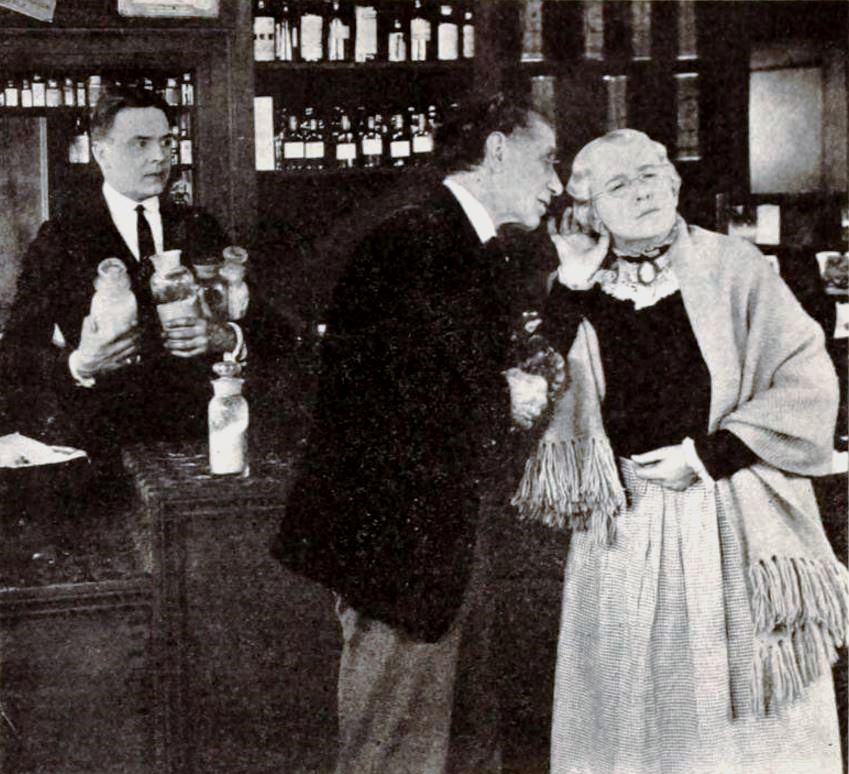
- Film still
- Directed by: Jack Nelson
- Screenplay by: Frederick J. Jackson; Joseph F. Poland
- Produced by: Thomas H. Ince
- Starring: Douglas MacLean; Marian De Beck; Victor Potel; Frances Raymond; Andrew Robson; Graham Pettie
- Cinematography: Bert Cann
- Production companies: Thomas H. Ince Corporation; Famous Players–Lasky Corporation
- Distributed by: Paramount Pictures
- Release date: June 19, 1921
- Running time: 50 minutes
- Country: United States
- Language: Silent (English intertitles)

One a Minute is a 1921 American comedy silent film directed by Jack Nelson and written by Frederick J. Jackson and Joseph F. Poland. The film stars Douglas MacLean, Marian De Beck, Victor Potel, Frances Raymond, Andrew Robson, and Graham Pettie. The film was released on June 19, 1921, by Paramount Pictures.

== Plot ==
As described in a film magazine, college graduate Jimmy Knight returns to the small town of his birth where he takes over his deceased father's drug store and combats a trust's drug store that has eclipsed the older institution in the public's favor. He falls in love with Miriam, daughter of Silas P. Rogers, the magnate controlling the trust, and fights against elimination to win her plaudits. As a desperate means of fighting the competition he places on sale a harmless concoction he calls "Knight's 99", representing it as his father's secret formula that cures all disease. Townspeople try the ointment and it cures every ailment. Jimmy becomes rich overnight and wins the girl's hand when her father cannot buy the formula. At the end it is disclosed that the fifth ingredient of the Knight's 99 responsible for the curative powers, which Rogers could not discover, is faith.

== Cast ==
- Douglas MacLean as Jimmy Knight
- Marian De Beck as Miriam Rogers
- Victor Potel as Jingo Pitts
- Frances Raymond as Granma Knight
- Andrew Robson as Silas P. Rogers
- Graham Pettie as Martin Duffey
- Robert Dudley as Rogers' Attorney (uncredited)
- Wilfred Lucas as Prosecutor (uncredited)
- Patsy Ruth Miller as Assembly Line Worker (uncredited)
- George H. Reed as J. Wellington Norcross, Townsman (uncredited)
- Carl Stockdale as Judge (uncredited)
