= Mary Charleson =

Irish actress

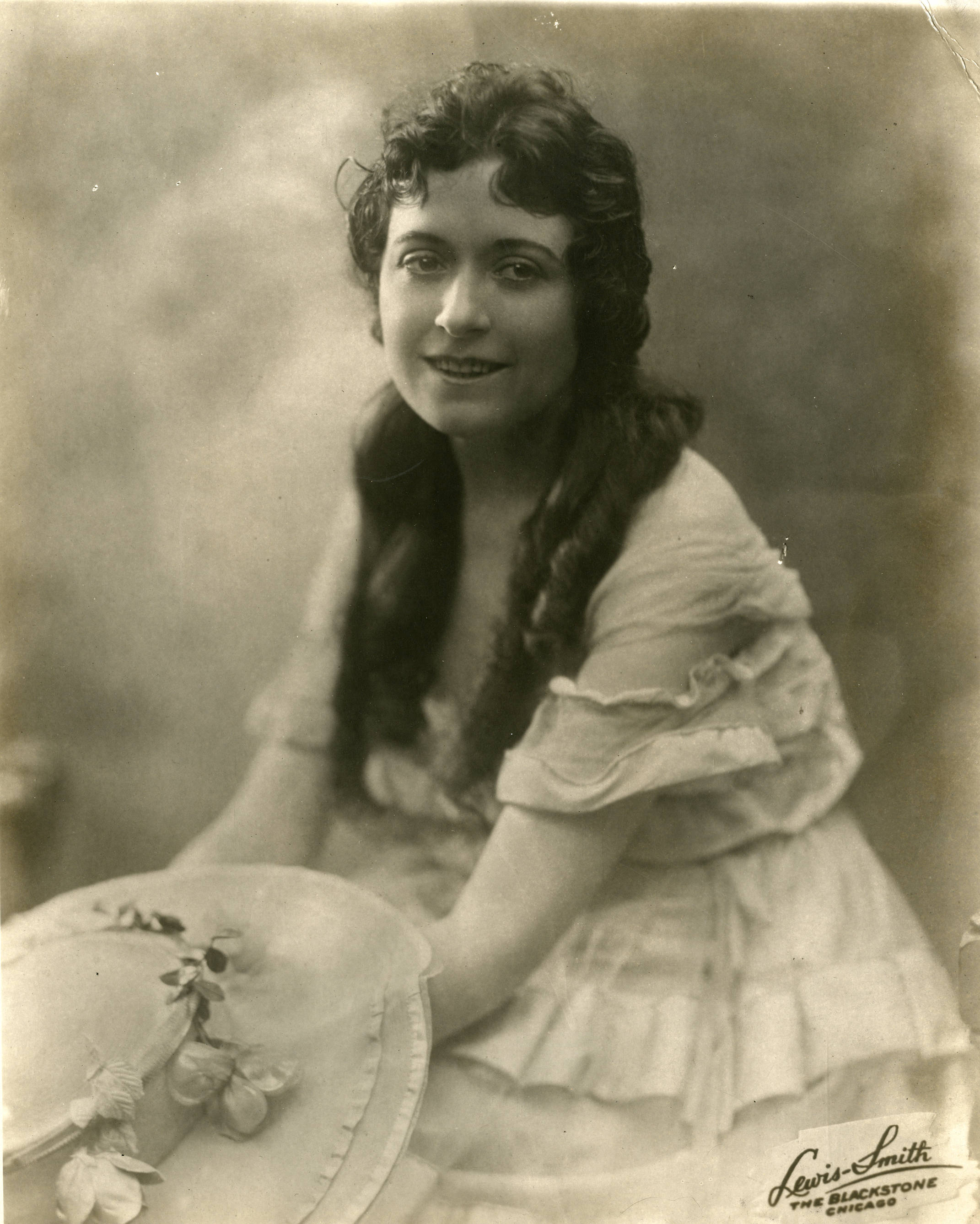
- Charleson in 1923
- Born: 18 May 1890; Dungannon, Ireland
- Died: 3 December 1961 (aged 71); Los Angeles, California, U.S.
- Resting place: Holy Cross Cemetery, Culver City, California, U.S.
- Occupation: Actress
- Years active: 1912–1920
- Spouse: Henry B. Walthall (m. 1918; died 1936)
- Relatives: Kate Price (aunt)

Mary Charleson (18 May 1890 – 3 December 1961) was an Irish silent film actress who starred in about 80 films in the U.S. between 1912 and 1920.

== Early life ==
Charleson was born in Dungannon in Ireland to George Charleson, a hairdresser, and Jane Steele. She was part of a theatrical family, related to the actress Kate Price. Charleson's family moved to California while she was still at school. Intent on following in the family tradition, Charleson took to the stage when she completed her schooling. Her first performance was with the Grand Opera Stock Company playing a variety of parts. She worked with a number of companies on the Pacific coast and then began her career in the silent film.

== Acting career ==
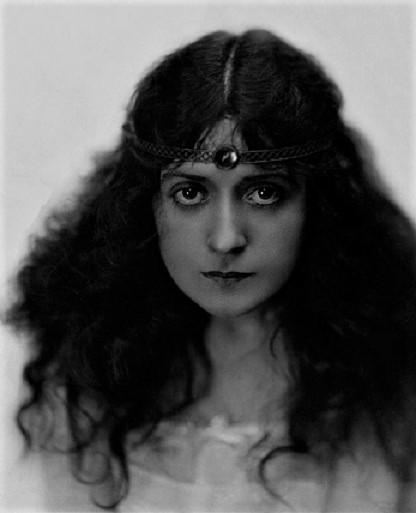
Mary Charleson in 1919

When started in the films her first film was The Ancient Bow in 1912 by the Vitagraph Company of America. The main highlights of her career are The Strange Story of Sylvia Gray (1914), by Vitagraph, The Road o'Strife in 1915 by the Lubin Manufacturing Company, Satan's Private Door in 1917 by the Essanay Film Manufacturing Company and Upstairs and Down (1919), by the Selznick Pictures Corporation.

Charleson worked with names like Rex Ingram and Rollin S. Sturgeon. On 16 March 1918, Charleson gave birth to Henry B. Walthall's baby Mary Patricia., and in 15 Nov 1918, Walthall divorced from his wife Isabel Fenton (Irene Fenton) in Chicago, and 5 days later, Walthall married Mary Charleson in Indiana. Mary Patricia Walthall later had some small film roles but she married an engineer from Buenos Aires and left the industry.

After the Western Human Stuff in 1920 by Universal Pictures, Charleson left acting to focus on her husband's business and became one of the forgotten stars of the silent era.

Mary Charleson died in Los Angeles, California on 3 December 1961 and was buried in Holy Cross Cemetery in Hollywood.

== Filmography ==
- The Road to Yesterday; or, Patio Memories of Days, directed by Rollin S. Sturgeon (1912)
- The Smoke from Lone Bill's Cabin, directed by Rollin S. Sturgeon (1913)
- The Intruder, directed by Maurice Costello and Wilfrid North (1913)
- The Education of Aunt Georgiana, directed by Maurice Costello and Robert Gaillard (1913)
- The Acid Test, directed by Maurice Costello and Robert Gaillard (1914)
- Mr. Barnes of New York, directed by Maurice Costello and Robert Gaillard (1914)
- The Strange Story of Sylvia Gray (1914)
- What Happened to Jones, directed by Fred Mace (1915)
- The Silent Accuser, directed by Joseph Kaufman (1915)
- The Country That God Forgot, directed by Marshall Neilan (1916)
- Passers By (1916)
- The Truant Soul, directed by Harry Beaumont (1916)
- The Little Shoes, directed by Arthur Berthelet (1917)
- Burning the Candle, directed by Harry Beaumont (1917)
- Satan's Private Door, directed by J. Charles Haydon (1917)
- The Saint's Adventure, directed by Arthur Berthelet (1917)
- His Robe of Honor, directed by Rex Ingram (1918)
- Humdrum Brown (1918)
- With Hoops of Steel (1918)
- The Long Lane's Turning
- Upstairs and Down, directed by Charles Giblyn (1919)
- Human stuff (1920)
