= Burning the Candle =

1917 silent film

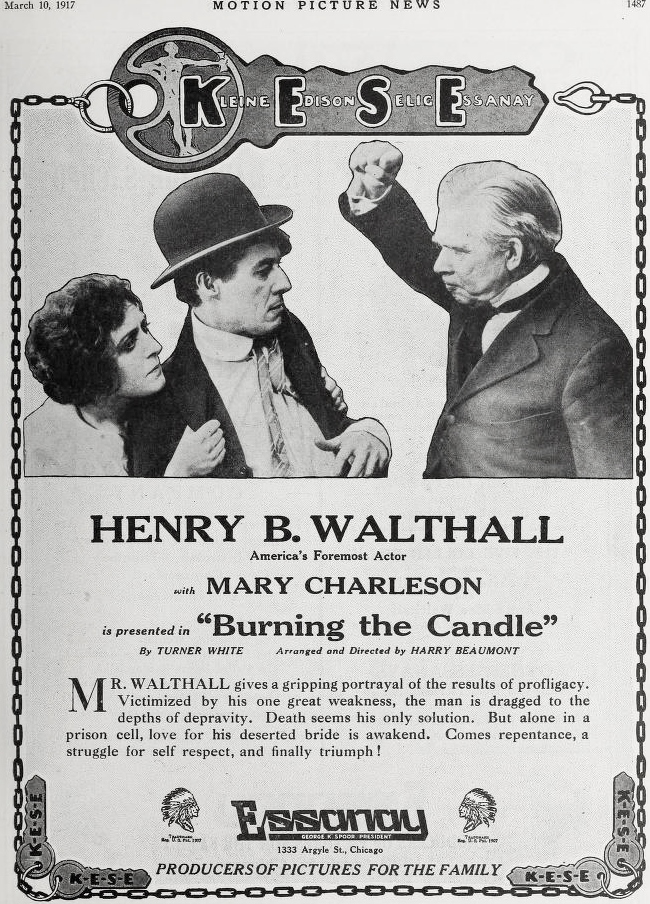
- Directed by: Harry Beaumont
- Written by: Leslie T. White; Harry Beaumont
- Starring: Henry B. Walthall; Mary Charleson; Frances Raymond
- Cinematography: Will E. Smith
- Production company: Essanay Pictures
- Distributed by: K-E-S-E Service
- Release date: March 5, 1917
- Running time: 50 minutes
- Country: United States
- Languages: Silent; English intertitles

Burning the Candle is a 1917 American silent drama film directed by Harry Beaumont and starring Henry B. Walthall, Mary Charleson and Frances Raymond.

== Cast ==
- Henry B. Walthall as James Maxwell
- Mary Charleson as Molly Carrington
- Julien Barton as Judge Carrington
- Frances Raymond as Mrs. Carrington
- Thurlow Brewer as Alfred Lewis
- Patrick Calhoun as Merrit Cole

== Bibliography ==
- Langman, Larry. American Film Cycles: The Silent Era. Greenwood Publishing, 1998.
