= The Truant Soul =

1916 silent film

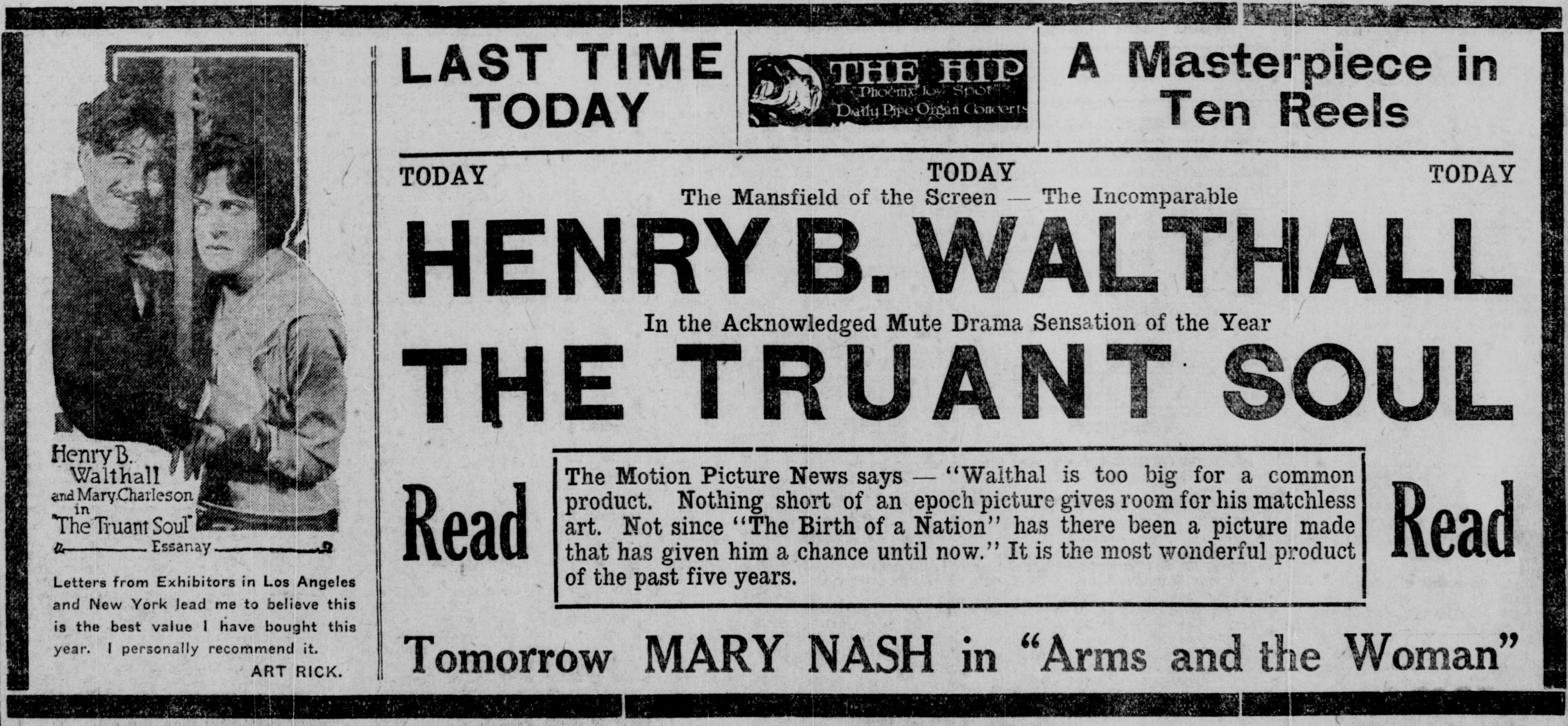
- Contemporary advertisement
- Directed by: Harry Beaumont
- Written by: Victor Rousseau; Charles J. McGuirk
- Produced by: George K. Spoor
- Starring: Henry B. Walthall; Mary Charleson; Patrick Calhoun
- Cinematography: Harry Zech
- Production company: Essanay Pictures
- Distributed by: K-E-S-E Service
- Release date: December 25, 1916
- Running time: 70 minutes
- Country: United States
- Languages: Silent; English intertitles

The Truant Soul is a 1916 American silent drama film directed by Harry Beaumont and starring Henry B. Walthall, Mary Charleson and Patrick Calhoun.

== Cast ==
- Henry B. Walthall as Dr. John Lancaster / Dr. Lawson
- Mary Charleson as Joan Wentworth
- Patrick Calhoun as Myers
- Anna Mae Walthall as Mrs. Dana
- Mary Parkyn as Mrs. Fraser
- Ullrich Haupt as Dr. Jenkins

== Bibliography ==
- Robert B. Connelly. The Silents: Silent Feature Films, 1910-36, Volume 40, Issue 2. December Press, 1998.
