= Victor Rousseau Emanuel =

English-born pulp fiction author

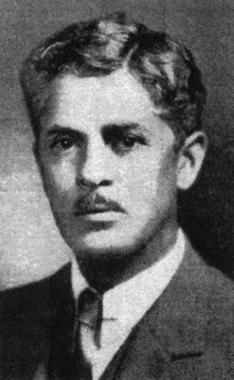
Victor Rousseau Emanuel (1920s)

Victor Rousseau Emanuel (born Avigdor Rousseau Emanuel; January 1879 – 6 April 1960) was a British writer who wrote novels, newspaper series, science fiction and pulp fiction works. He was active in Great Britain and the United States during the first half of the 20th century.

During the first 20 years of his career, Emanuel wrote predominantly under the pen names Victor Rousseau, H. M. Egbert, and V. R. Emanuel. In the 1930s, he only created pulp fiction under his own name. He wrote racy stories under the pen name Lew Merrill.

== Early years ==
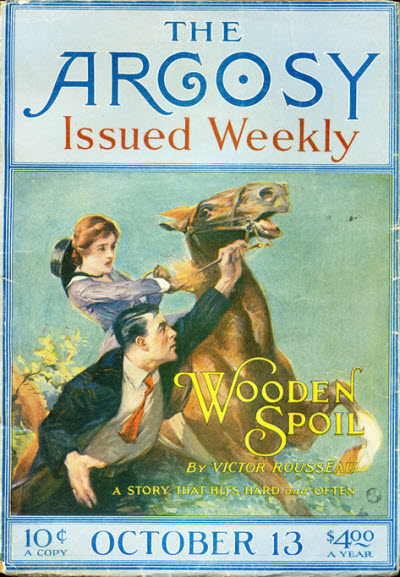
Rousseau Emanuel's "Wooden Spoil" was originally published in the 13 October 1917 issue of The Argosy

Born in England, Emanuel enrolled at Harrow School in 1892 and Balliol College, Oxford in 1896. However, he soon left Balliol and sailed to Cape Town, Cape Colony. For the next two years, Emanuel travelled South Africa, working odd jobs. While in Johannesburg, he obtained a journalist job with the Standard and Diggers' News and then the Transvaal Leader.

In 1899, during the Boer War, Emanuel enlisted with Edward Cecil Bethune's Mounted Infantry, a British Army unit. However, he was discharged after 35 days. Several weeks later, Emanuel registered with the Natal Colonial Scouts at Pietermaritzburg. He was officially discharged from the Scouts in April 1900.

== Early works ==
Emanuel returned to London, wrote and published his first novel, Derwent's Horse. It was a humorous account of two recruits serving with Bethune's Mounted Infantry. With the proceeds from this novel, Emanuel sailed to New York City, in June 1901.

While between jobs in 1902, Emanuel began writing his second novel, Spartacus. It was inspired by Gustave Flaubert's novel, Salammbo. In September 1905, Emanuel submitted Spartacus to Houghton-Mifflin They rejected it for publication, saying it was a weak novel with poor characterisation. That same year, Emanuel assisted with the Jewish Encyclopedia, published by Funk & Wagnalls in 1905 and 1906.

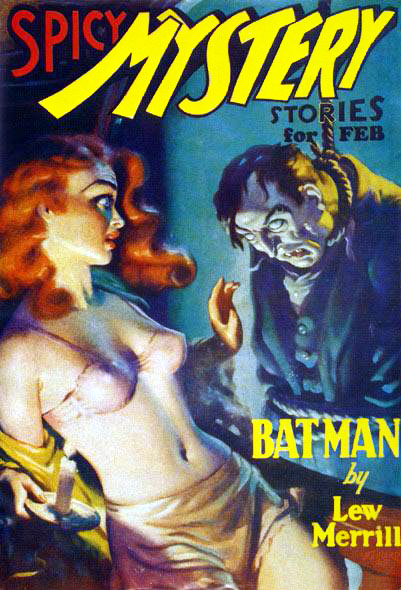
Cover of the pulp magazine Spicy Mystery Stories (February 1936, Vol. 2, no. 4) featuring Batman under the Lew Merrill name.

Emanuel's earliest known fiction output appeared in late 1905, in the form of children's vignettes, syndicated nationally, carrying the byline V. R. Emanuel.

From early 1906 through 1907, Emanuel wrote regional Florida special articles for the Baltimore American. He took on an editorial post with Will Carleton's Every Where magazine in mid-1907. Here, he also created the alias Egbert Prentice. This name morphed into the H. M. Egbert alias.

Emanuel made his first official professional magazine sale, with a short story about the Canadian North, "The Last Cartridge," in The Munsey (1907 September).

== Harper's Weekly ==
In 1908, Emanuel started working as an editor for Harper's Weekly, a position he retained for three years. It is here that H. M. Egbert makes its earliest known debut, within the edition of 26 December 1908, attached to an article, rather than a fiction story.

Whilst employed by Harpers, Emanuel wrote special articles and the occasional short story. Stories he or the staff deemed unfit for publication by Harper's Weekly were sold to the Illustrated Sunday Magazine, a nationally syndicated publication. Stories that failed to meet with this editor's approval were likewise circulated to lesser syndicates.

== Newspaper series ==
In 1909, Emanuel started his series The Surgeon of Souls. This series featured Dr. Ivan Brodsky, a man who believed in faith and hypnotism as the cure toward laying ghosts, etc. The stories were syndicated amongst the big-city newspapers under the alias H. M. Egbert, but sold poorly. Fifteen years later, 11 of the surviving tales were reprinted as original fiction in Weird Tales magazine, bylined under Victor Rousseau.

Emanuel's first science fiction series was The Devil Chair. John Haynes, an Englishman, stripped of inherited land in America, is paralysed by a bullet to the spine and falsely imprisoned. While in the prison workshop, he fashions a gyroscopic device, that whilst adhered initially to a boot, propels him a couple hundred miles per hour. While affixed to any object, the device cannot be removed, until he deactivates it. Once free from prison, Haynes uses his device to exact retribution on all his enemies.

== Canada ==
In 1913, Emanuel, his wife and two children moved to Canada. He wrote the Canadian-themed serials Jacqueline of Golden River and Wooden Spoil. Both serials eventually become hardcover books and sold extremely well.

In early 1914, Emanuel began the popular series Tales of the St. Lawrence Riverway. Set in the village of St. Jean, Quebec, the central character was Father Sebastian, the village priest. Nine Riverway stories appeared in Blue Book magazine (1914 September through 1915 May), whilst others, unaccepted here, were sold elsewhere over the ensuing years. In the 1930s, the series was reprinted by the Toronto Star and the Boston Globe.

In early 1914, Emanuel finished, The Messiah of the Cylinder, a novel influenced by H. G. Wells' When the Sleeper Wakes. Despite acceptance by Everybody's Magazine, the story lingered for three years (1917 June, July, August, September). In the summer of 1915, Emanuel produced a science fiction series, The Sea Demons. It was printed by All-Story Weekly and serialised in three instalments (1916 January 1, 15, 22).

Emanuel also wrote screen adaptations of syndicated fiction stories for Universal Film. His first screenplay was for the film The Truant Soul (25 December 1916). A decade later, several of Emanuel's pulp western stories were adapted into films.

Emanuel's other science and fantasy serials for the Munsey publications included:

- Fruit of the Lamp (The Argosy, 1918 February 2, 9, 16, 23)
- Draft of Eternity (All-Story Weekly, 1918 June 1, 8, 15, 22)
- Eric of the Strong Heart (Railroad Man's Magazine, 1918 November 16, 23, 30; 7 December 14)
- The Eye of Balamok (All-Story Weekly, 1920 January 17, 24, 31)
- My Lady of the Nile (Argosy All-Story Weekly, 1921 May 7, 14, 21, 28)

== England and New York ==
In December 1919, Emanuel and his family returned to England. However, he struggled to sell his works, resulting in periods of homelessness and hunger for his family. In early 1922, Emanuel wrote a new Canadian-themed serial, The Home Trail. It was printed in People's Story Magazine (1922 August 25; 4 September 11, 18, 25) and sold for $1,000.

In July 1922, Emanuel returned to New York. He sold another Canadian serial for $1,000, Lee of the Northwest Mounted. It appeared in People's Popular Monthly (1923 January, February, March, April, May, June, July, August). Later that year, he sold another serial for $1,000, Sergeant Forbes, Alias. It appeared in four instalments of People's magazine (1923 August 15; 1 September 15; 1 October).

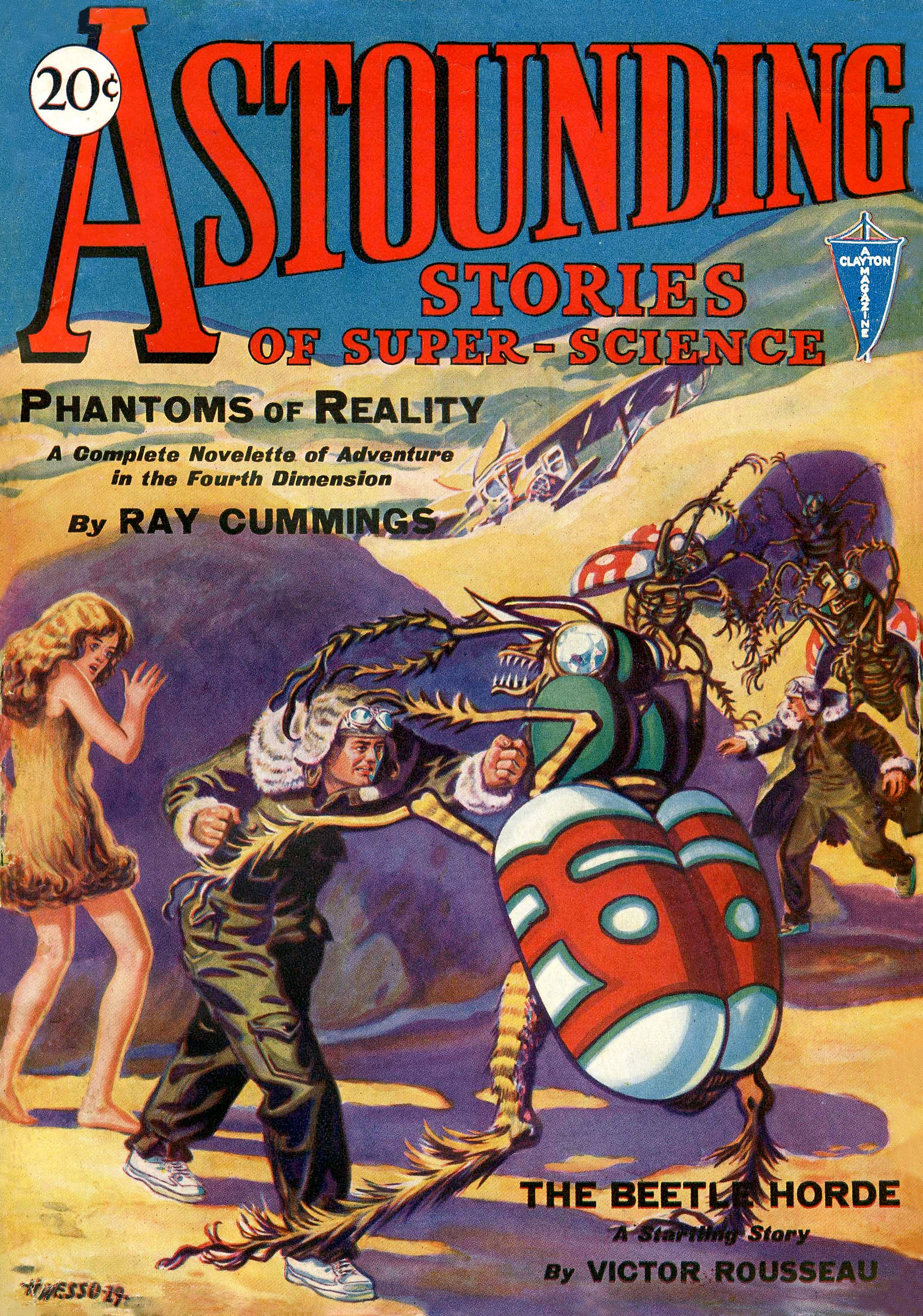
The debut issue's cover of Astounding Stories featured Emanuel's serial "The Beetle Horde"

From 1923 to 1925, Emanuel produced three "serious" novels under his own surname. The first novel, The Story of John Paul, was suppressed as libelous; largely because his brother, Montague, is named in the novel as the protagonist's father; additionally, the novel was anti-Semitic. In late 1924, Emanuel sold the second novel, Middle Years. Released in early 1925, it dealt with a middle-aged man's life insecurities and fancy for a younger woman. The third novel, The Selmans, attacked England's Jews as hypocritical.

Emanuel continued to write Canadian-themed works until 1942. He also wrote heavily during this period for the various self-proclaimed True magazines. However, since they were reportedly "true" tales, none of the tales sported a byline. Confirming which stories are his is nearly impossible, unless he used Canada or South Africa as background colour as potential clues.

With the re-release of The Surgeon of Souls in Weird Tales (1926–1927), Emanuel re-entered the fantasy field courtesy of Bernarr MacFadden's Ghost Stories magazine (1926–1929). He created a series of psychic investigative tales featuring Dr. Martinus. He also sold five science fiction stories in 1930 to the newly launched Astounding Stories of Super-Science, and two novelettes in 1931 to Miracle Science and Fantasy Stories.

== End of career ==
By the mid-1930s MacFadden had stopped buying stories from Emanuel. He then wrote for Clayton's Strange Tales of Mystery and Terror, supplying three stories (1931–1932). In 1932, he officially entered Weird Tales with two stories, and in 1933, one last science fiction story in The Argosy.

To obtain more work, Emanuel now started writing so-called "spicy pulps", creating hundreds of sexually suggestive short stories. He added sexual content to stories he had never sold and published them. From 1940 to 1941, Emanuel wrote the first dozen "Jim Anthony, Super Detective" novels for Super-Detective; Jim Anthony was a pulp hero created in imitation of the popular Doc Savage. After 1947, Emanuel produced a few more stories before retiring.

== Works ==
=== Works (as Victor Rousseau) ===
- Derwent's Horse (UK: Methuen, 1901)
- Messiah of the Cylinder (USA: A.C. McClurg, 1917) and Apostle of the Cylinder (UK: Hodder and Stoughton, 1918)
- Wooden Spoil (USA: George H. Doran, 1919) unauthorised edition
- Wooden Spoil (USA: Grosset and Dunlap, 1919)--(UK: Hodder and Stoughton, 1919)
- The Eye of Balamlok (The All-Story, 1920)
- The Big Muskeg (USA: Stewart Kidd, 1921)--(UK: Hodder and Stoughton, 1923)
- The Lion's Jaws (UK: Hodder and Stoughton, 1923)
- The Home Trail (UK: Hodder and Stoughton, 1924)
- The Big Man of Bonne Chance (UK: Hodder and Stoughton, 1925)
- Golden Horde (UK: Hodder and Stoughton, 1926)

=== Works (as H. M. Egbert) ===
- Jacqueline of Golden River (USA: Doubleday Page, 1920)--(UK: Hodder and Stoughton, 1924)
- My Lady of the Nile (UK: Hodder and Stoughton, 1923)
- The Big Malopo (UK: John Long, 1924)
- Draught of Eternity (UK: John Long, 1924, reprinted by Steeger Books)
- The Sea Demons (UK: John Long, 1924, reprinted by Armchair Fiction)
- Eric of the Strong Heart (UK: John Long, 1925, reprinted by Steeger Books)
- Mrs. Aladdin (UK: John Long, 1925)
- Salted Diamonds (UK: John Long, 1926) 2nd imprint circa 1927–28
- Winding Trails (UK: John Long, 1927)

=== Works (as V. R. Emanuel) ===
- The Story of John Paul (UK: Constable, 1923)
- The Selmans (USA: The Dial Press, 1925)
- Middle Years (USA: Minton, Balch, 1925)

=== Works (as Victor Rousseau, reprinted posthumously) ===
- The Surgeon of Souls (USA: The Spectre Library, 2006) Dr. Ivan Brodsky series
- The Tracer of Egos (USA: The Spectre Library, 2007) Dr. Phileas Immanuel series
- The Devil Chair (USA: The Spectre Library, 2009) John Haynes series

== Sources ==
- Wallace, Morgan A. His Second Self: The Bio-Bibliography of Victor Rousseau Emanuel, The Spectre Library, 2011 ISBN 978-0-9791734-2-4
