= Florence Barker (actress) =

American actress (1891–1913)

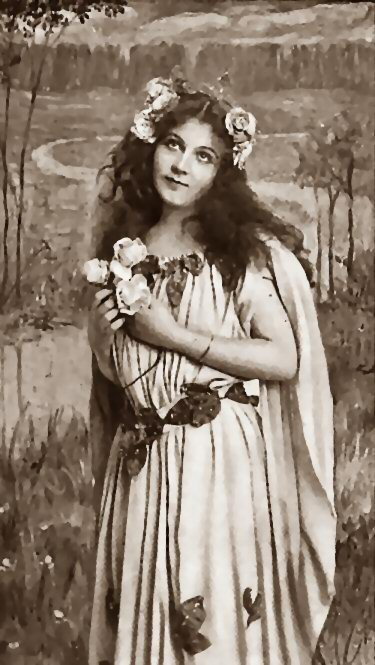
- Burr McIntosh Monthly, January, 1908
- Born: November 22, 1891; Los Angeles, California
- Died: February 15, 1913 (aged 21); Los Angeles, California
- Other name: Priscilla May
- Years active: 1905-1912

Florence Barker (November 22, 1891 – February 15, 1913) was an American stage and silent film actress from Los Angeles.

She began in amateur theatre in her early teens, and her professional debut came in the Ferris Company's production of The Altar of Friendship in Los Angeles in 1907. By age 18, she was playing lead roles at the Grand Theatre in Los Angeles.

At around this time she started acting in motion pictures and went on to appear in at least 63 films. For several years, Barker was the Biograph Company's leading woman. She also worked in Paris and London as the leading woman with the Pathé Freres film company. By 1912, she was performing for Powers Picture Plays.

Barker died of pneumonia in Los Angeles at the age of 21.

== Selected filmography ==
Year	Title	Role	Notes
1908	An Awful Moment		
1909	The Girls and Daddy		
1909	Getting Even		
1909	Choosing a Husband	Gladys	
1910	The Englishman and the Girl		
1910	Faithful	John's Sweetheart	
1910	The Two Brothers	Mexican	
1910	The Kid	Doris Marshall	
1910	The Oath and the Man	Madame Prevost	
1911	The Two Paths		
1911	His Daughter	Mary	
1911	Priscilla's April Fool Joke	Priscilla	
1911	Priscilla and the Umbrella	Priscilla	
1912	A Voice from the Deep		
