= Choosing a Husband =

1909 film directed by D. W. Griffith

- Directed by: D. W. Griffith
- Written by: D. W. Griffith
- Starring: Florence Barker
- Cinematography: G. W. Bitzer
- Distributed by: Biograph Company
- Release date: December 30, 1909
- Running time: 6 minutes
- Country: United States
- Language: Silent (English intertitles)

Choosing a Husband is a 1909 American short silent drama film directed by D. W. Griffith and starring Florence Barker. It is not known whether the film currently survives.

== Plot ==
Gladys has four bachelors pursuing her. To test their loyalty, she fabricates errands to make them believe she is away when they visit. During each visit, the men meet her attractive younger sister. Each ends up flirting with the sister and fails the test.

== Cast ==
- Florence Barker as Gladys
- Kate Bruce
- Charles Craig as Bachelor
- Anthony O'Sullivan as Bachelor
- Billy Quirk as Bachelor
- Mack Sennett as Bachelor
- Blanche Sweet as One of Gladys' Friends
- Henry B. Walthall as Harry
- Dorothy West as One of Gladys' Friends

== See also ==
- List of American films of 1909
- D. W. Griffith filmography
- Blanche Sweet filmography
