= His Robe of Honor =

1918 silent film directed by Rex Ingram

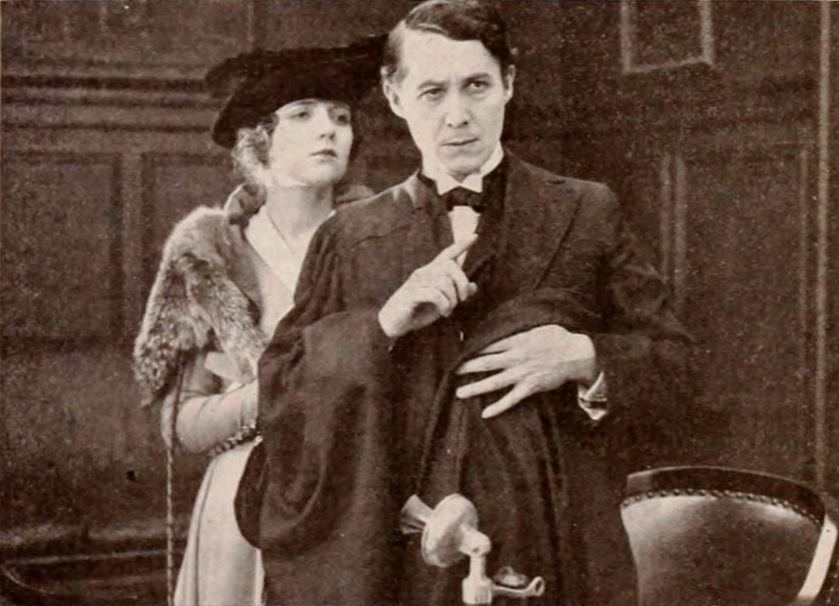
- Lois Wilson and Henry B. Walthall in His Robe of Honor
- Directed by: Rex Ingram
- Written by: Ethel Dorrance; James Dorrance; Julian La Mothe
- Starring: Henry B. Walthall; Mary Charleson; Lois Wilson
- Cinematography: Carl Widen
- Production company: Paralta Plays
- Distributed by: W. W. Hodkinson Corporation
- Release date: January 15, 1918
- Country: United States
- Languages: Silent; English intertitles

His Robe of Honor is a 1918 American silent crime drama film directed by Rex Ingram and starring Henry B. Walthall, Mary Charleson and Lois Wilson.

The film's sets were designed by the art director R. Holmes Paul.

== Cast ==
- Henry B. Walthall as Julian Randolph
- Mary Charleson as Roxana Frisbee
- Lois Wilson as Laura Nelson
- Noah Beery as 'Boss' Nordhoff
- Joseph J. Dowling as Bruce Nelson
- Roy Laidlaw as Robert Partland
- Fred Montague as Million Mulligan
- Eugene Pallette as Clifford Nordhoff
- Guy Newhard as Carrots

== Bibliography ==
- Leonhard Gmür. Rex Ingram: Hollywood's Rebel of the Silver Screen. 2013.
