= Faithful (1910 film) =

1910 film directed by D. W. Griffith

- Directed by: D. W. Griffith
- Written by: Frank E. Woods
- Produced by: American Mutoscope and Biograph Company
- Starring: Arthur V. Johnson; Mack Sennett
- Cinematography: Billy Bitzer; Arthur Marvin
- Distributed by: Biograph Company
- Release date: March 21, 1910
- Running time: 17 minutes; one reel
- Country: United States
- Language: Silent (English intertitles)

Faithful is a 1910 American silent short comedy film directed by D. W. Griffith and starring Mack Sennett, a future studio owner and comedy director.

== Cast ==
- Arthur V. Johnson as John Dobbs
- Mack Sennett as Zeke (Faithful)
- Florence Barker as John's sweetheart
- Kate Bruce as Mother of John's sweetheart
- Francis Grandon as Neighbor
- Dell Henderson as Bystander
- W. Chrystie Miller as Neighbor
- Anthony O'Sullivan as Bystander/Neighbor
- Frank Powell as Butler (unconfirmed)
- Billy Quirk as Neighbor
- Dorothy West as Neighbor

== See also ==
- List of American films of 1910
