= The Englishman and the Girl =

1910 film directed by D. W. Griffith

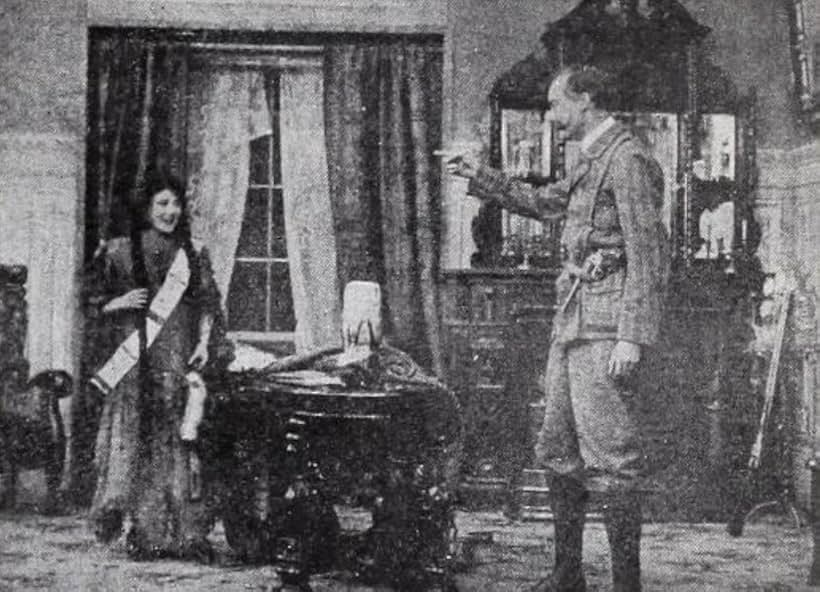
- Film still
- Directed by: D. W. Griffith
- Written by: D. W. Griffith
- Starring: Charles Craig; Mary Pickford
- Cinematography: Billy Bitzer
- Distributed by: Biograph
- Release date: February 17, 1910
- Running time: 11 minutes
- Country: United States
- Language: Silent (English intertitles)

The Englishman and the Girl is a 1910 short comedy film directed by D. W. Griffith. It is being restored by the Film Preservation Society.

== Plot ==
A small town's drama group is preparing for a Pocahontas-type play when one of the members' English relatives suddenly arrives for a visit. This man, unlike the theater group, does not have any sense of humor, which sparks the relative and his friends to play practical jokes on him. They dress up as Indians to scare him, but the Englishman is so convinced that he grabs his gun to shoot at them. At another moment, they try to get revenge by pretending to attack him, but the plan again backfires when the Englishman uses a prop gun from a heroine to horrify them.

== Cast ==
- Charles Craig as Albert Wilberforce
- Mary Pickford as The Girl
- George Nichols as Mr. Thayer
- Kate Bruce as Mrs. Thayer
- Gladys Egan as The Child
- Ruth Hart as A Friend
- Dorothy West as A Friend/Member of Dramatic Club
- Francis J. Grandon as In Store/Member of Dramatic Club
- Anthony O'Sullivan as In Store/Member of Dramatic Club
- Mack Sennett as In Store/Member of Dramatic Club
- Linda Arvidson as Member of Dramatic Club
- Dell Henderson as Member of Dramatic Club
- W. Chrystie Miller as Member of Dramatic Club
- Gertrude Robinson as Member of Dramatic Club
- Thomas H. Ince
- Florence Barker

== See also ==
- List of American films of 1910
- D. W. Griffith filmography
- Mary Pickford filmography
