= Rose O'Salem-Town =

1910 film directed by D. W. Griffith

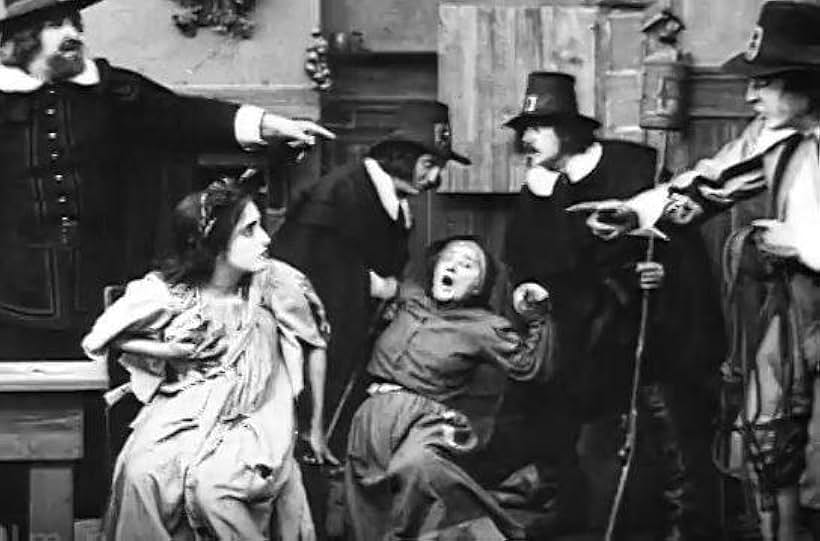
- Film still
- Directed by: D. W. Griffith
- Written by: Emmett C. Hall
- Produced by: American Mutoscope and Biograph Company
- Starring: Henry B. Walthall
- Cinematography: Billy Bitzer
- Distributed by: Biograph Company
- Release date: September 26, 1910
- Running time: 17 minutes
- Country: United States
- Language: Silent (English intertitles)

Rose O'Salem-Town is a 1910 silent short drama film directed by D. W. Griffith.

The story takes place in Salem, Massachusetts during the era of the witch trials.

== Cast ==
- Dorothy West as A Sea Child
- Clara T. Bracy as The Sea Child's Mother
- Henry B. Walthall as The Trapper
- George Nichols as The Puritan
- William J. Butler as Judge (uncredited)
- Verner Clarges as Judge (uncredited)
- Edward Dillon as A Puritan (uncredited)
- Gladys Egan as Little Child (uncredited)
- Frank Evans as Judge (uncredited)
- Francis J. Grandon as Captor (uncredited)
- Guy Hedlund as Indian (uncredited)
- Arthur V. Johnson (uncredited)
- Henry Lehrman as Captor (uncredited)
- Marion Leonard (uncredited)
- Charles Hill Mailes as Indian / Puritan (uncredited)

Rose O'Salem Town (1910)

== See also ==
- List of American films of 1910
- List of films about witchcraft
