= The Oath and the Man =

1910 film by D. W. Griffith

- Directed by: D. W. Griffith
- Written by: Stanner E.V. Taylor
- Starring: Henry B. Walthall; Florence Barker; W. Chrystie Miller; Francis J. Grandon
- Cinematography: G. W. Bitzer
- Release date: September 22, 1910
- Running time: 17 minutes (16 frame/s)
- Country: United States
- Language: Silent (English intertitles)

The Oath and the Man is a 1910 American silent drama film directed by D. W. Griffith.

== Cast ==
- Henry B. Walthall as Henri Prevost
- Florence Barker as Madame Prevost
- W. Chrystie Miller as A Priest
- Francis J. Grandon as A Nobleman
