= Yellow Ticket (disambiguation) =

Yellow ticket is a prostitute ID card in Russian Empire

(The) Yellow Ticket may also refer to:

- The Yellow Ticket (1931 film), an American feature film
- The Yellow Ticket (play), a 1914 play by Michael Morton
- The Yellow Ticket (1918 American film), an American silent film
- The Yellow Ticket (1918 German film)
- The Yellow Ticket (1928 film), a Soviet silent drama film

== See also ==
- The Yellow Passport, 1916 silent film based on the 1914 play
- Yellow passport (disambiguation)
- Yellow Card (disambiguation)
