= Yellow passport (disambiguation) =

Yellow passport may refer to:

- Yellow ticket, prostitution permit in the Russian Empire
- The Yellow Passport, American 1916 silent film
- El pasaporte amarillo,
  - A 1915 novel by Joaquín Dicenta
  - A 2009 Chilean film directed by Raúl Ruiz

== See also ==
- Yellow Ticket (disambiguation)
- Yellow Card (disambiguation)
