= Hal August =

American silent film actor (1890–1918)

- Born: Frank T. Halleck; August 23, 1890; Oakland, California
- Died: September 21, 1918 (aged 28); North Chicago, Illinois
- Resting place: Hollywood Forever Cemetery
- Occupations: Actor, US Navy Reserve
- Years active: 1913–1918

Hal August (1890–1918) was a silent film actor born as Frank T. Halleck or Frank T. Hallock or Frank T. Hallack. He performed mostly in westerns and dramas.

He appeared in numerous short films directed by Edwin August and produced by Edwin's production company Eaco Films. He worked also for the Bison Film Company, Balboa Amusement Producing Company and Powers Picture Plays. Contemporary references often list him and Edwin August as brothers or half-brothers.

August married Corinne M. Hooker in 1915, in a ceremony that was kept secret until she sued for divorce later that year.

He joined the US Navy Reserve during the Great War, but died from pneumonia on base in Great Lakes naval station, Illinois in September 1918. He was buried at the Hollywood Forever Cemetery.

== Selected filmography ==
- His Own Blood (1913) *short
- An evil of the Slums (1914) *short
- A Coincidental Bridegroom (1914) *short
- Into the Lion's Pit (1914) *short
- Withered Hands (1914) *short
- My Mother's Irish Shawls (1914) *short
- The Hand That Rules the World (1914) *short
- Hands Invisible (1914) *short
- The Romance of an Actor (1914) *short
- Pitfalls (1914) *short
- The Taint of an Alien (1914) *short
- The Two Gun Man (1914) *short
- The Great Secret (1914) *short
- A Double Haul (1914) *short
- A Strange Adventure (1914) *short
- Beyond the Trail (1916) *short
