= Colonel Newcome =

Colonel Newcome may refer to:

- Colonel Newcome, a major character in The Newcomes, an 1855 novel by William Makepeace Thackeray
- Colonel Newcome (play), a 1906 play by the British writer Michael Morton, based on the novel
- Colonel Newcome (film), a 1920 British silent historical drama film, based on the novel
