= Michael Morton (dramatist) =

English dramatist (1864–1931)

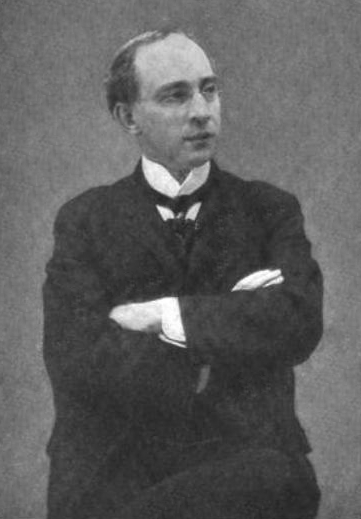
- Morton in 1903
- Born: 1864; London, England
- Died: 11 January 1931 (aged 66–67); Walton-on-the-Hill, England
- Occupation: Dramatist
- Spouse: Florence Mainwaring-Dunstan
- Children: 1
- Relatives: Martha Morton (sister)

Michael Morton (1864 – 11 January 1931) was an English dramatist. He is known for the play Alibi (1928), based on Agatha Christie's novel The Murder of Roger Ackroyd (1926).

== Biography ==
Morton was born in London, in 1864, and spent most of his childhood in the United States. His sister was the playwright Martha Morton.

Morton married Florence Mainwaring-Dunstan, and they had one son. He died at his home in Walton-on-the-Hill, Surrey on 11 January 1931, aged 66 or 67.

== Career ==
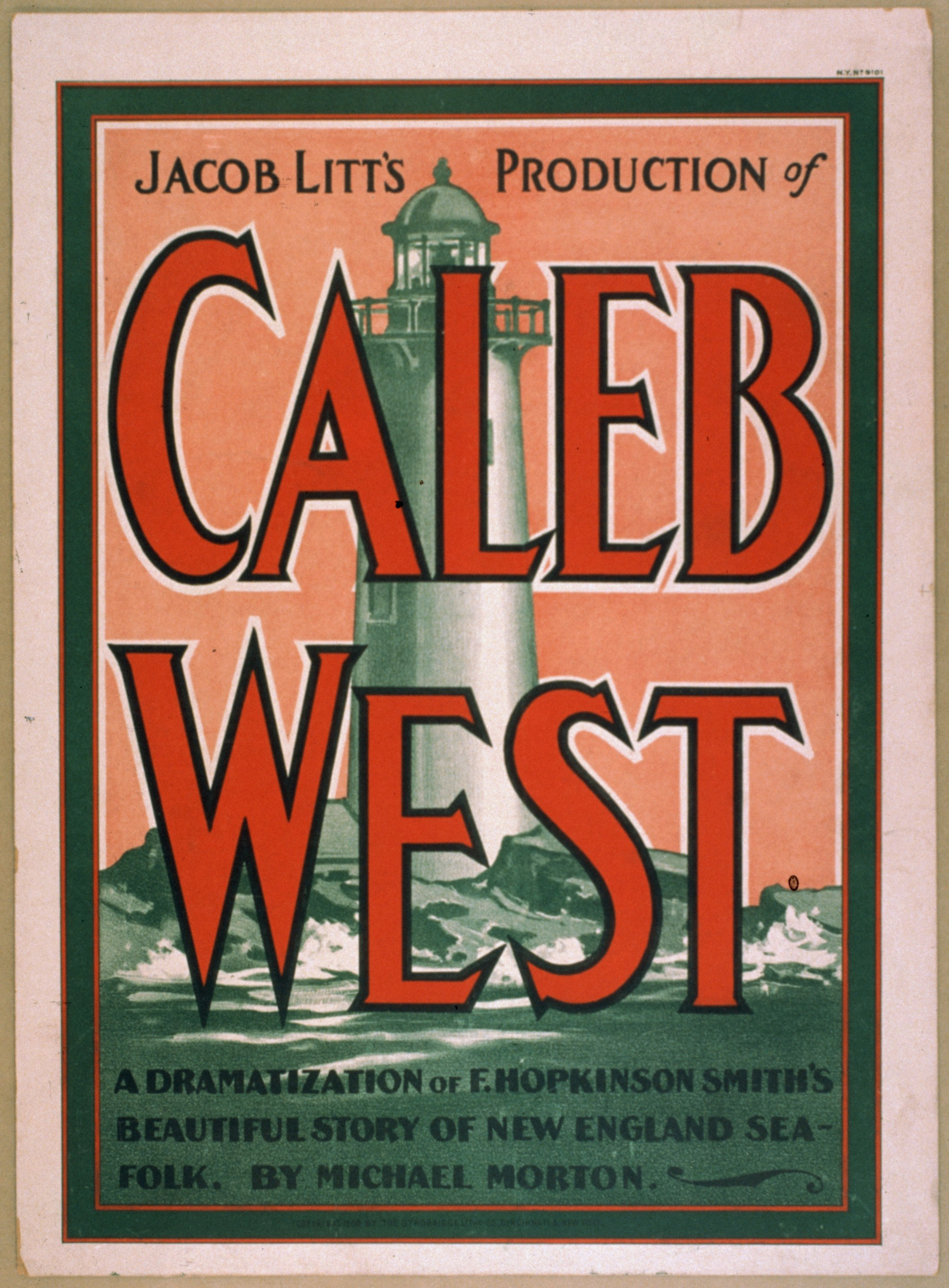
Poster for the play Caleb West (1900), adapted by Morton from the novel by Francis Hopkinson Smith

=== Detective Sparkes ===
Morton's comedy called Detective Sparkes opened at the Garrick Theatre in August 1909 to good reviews. He also directed the production which ran into October for a total of 64 performances.

=== The Yellow Ticket ===
In 1914, Morton's play, The Yellow Ticket ran 183 performances on Broadway and starred Florence Reed and John Barrymore. It was adapted to the screen and, due to its popularity, several filmed versions were made in the silent era alone. The first, The Yellow Passport (1916), was directed by Edwin August and starred Clara Kimball Young. The second version, The Yellow Ticket (1918), starred Fannie Ward, Warner Oland and Milton Sills. A German version called Der Gelbe Schein was produced in 1918 and starred Pola Negri. Yet another filmed version was a talking picture and was directed by Raoul Walsh in 1931. It was also titled The Yellow Ticket; its players were Elissa Landi, Lionel Barrymore and Laurence Olivier. James Wong Howe was the cameraman.

=== Colonel Newcome ===
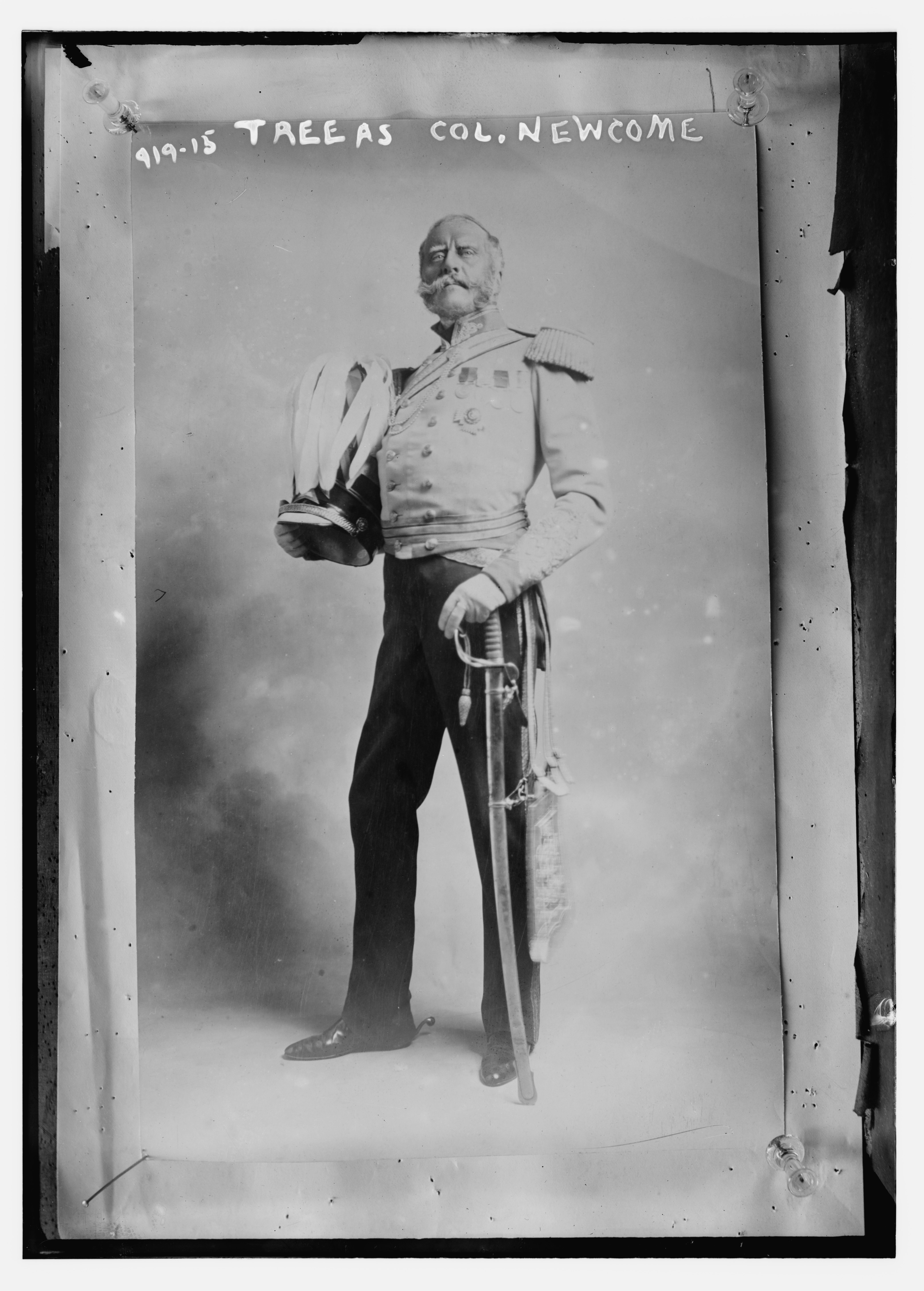
Herbert Beerbohm Tree in Colonel Newcome (1917)

Morton adapted William Makepeace Thackeray's 1854-55 novel The Newcomes into a play called Colonel Newcome, which opened in April 1917 at the New Amsterdam Theatre and starred Herbert Tree and St. Clair Bayfield.

=== Woman to Woman ===
His 1921 play Woman to Woman was adapted three times for film.

=== Alibi ===
He adapted Agatha Christie's novel The Murder of Roger Ackroyd into a play called Alibi, which opened in London in 1928. This was her first work adapted to the stage and it ran 250 performances.
