= The Yellow Ticket (play) =

Play by Michael Morton

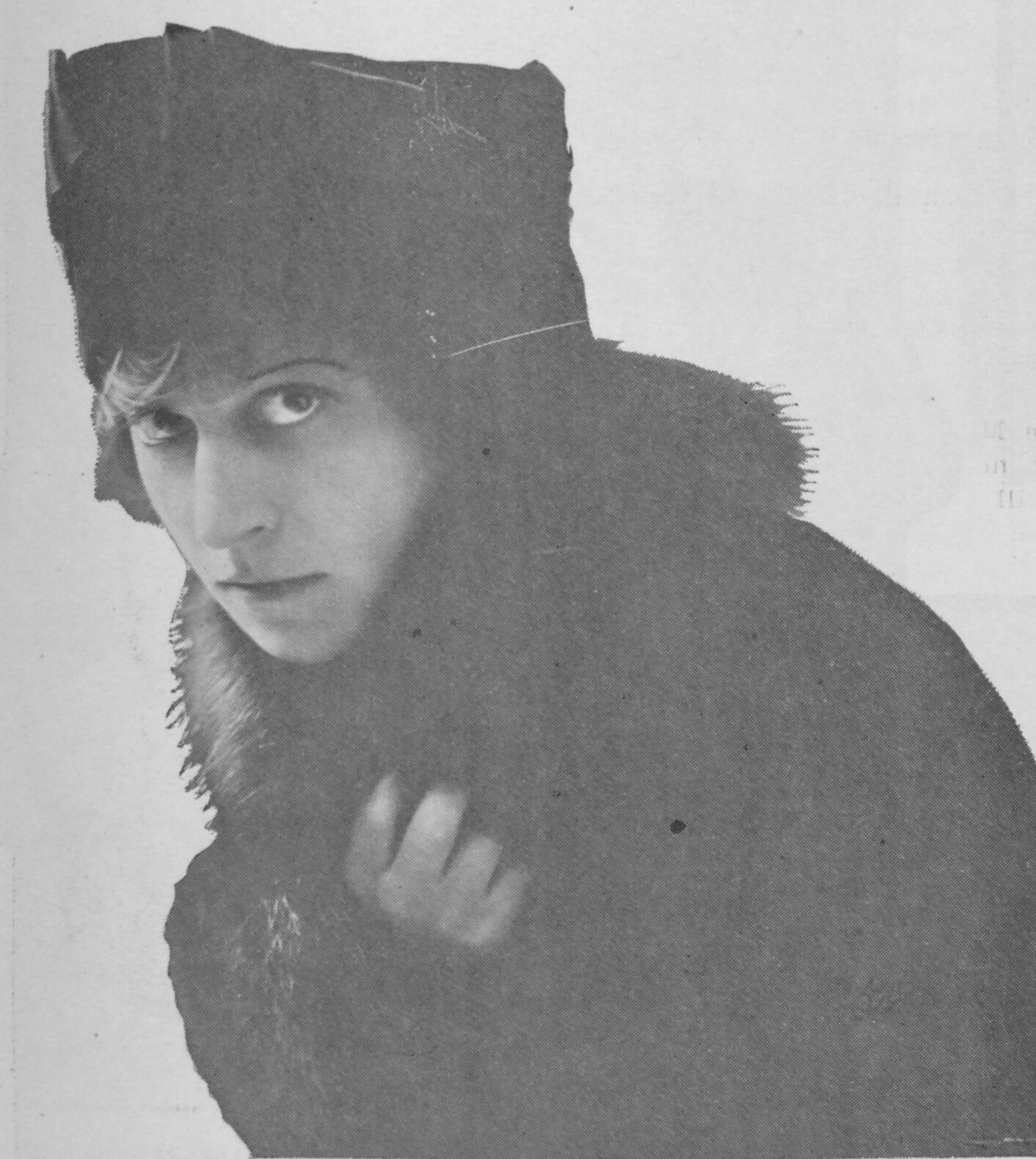
Belle Mitchell as Marya in a 1915 U.S. touring production of "The Yellow Ticket".

The Yellow Ticket is a 1914 Broadway play by dramatist Michael Morton, which premiered at the Eltinge 42nd Street Theatre in Manhattan on January 20, 1914.

== Plot ==
Anna Mirrel, a young Jewish girl in Czarist Russia, is forced to pretend to be a prostitute to obtain a prostitute's passport (a "yellow ticket") in order to visit her father, whom she believes to be ill. When she arrives in St. Petersburg, she learns that her father has been killed. She encounters a young journalist and tells him about injustices the government has kept him from learning about.

== Original cast ==
- John Barrymore as Julian Rolfe
- Florence Reed as Anna Mirrel, a.k.a. Marya Varenka
- Emmett Corrigan as Monsieur Zoubatoff
- A. C. P. Evans as Vassellevitch
- Macey Harlam as Petrov Paviak
- Elaine Inescort as Marjory Seaton
- Julian L'Estrange as Count Nikolai Rostov
- Harry Lillford as Boglosky
- John B. Mason as Baron Stepan Audrey
- David Torrence as John Seaton
- Michael Wilens as Peter

== In other media ==
=== Film ===
- The Yellow Passport, a 1916 silent film drama starring Clara Kimball Young as Sonia Sokoloff and Edwin August as Adolph Rosenheimer
- The Yellow Ticket, a 1918 silent film starring Fannie Ward as Anna Mirrel, and Milton Sills as Julian Rolfe
- The Yellow Ticket, a 1931 pre-Code American drama film starring Elissa Landi as Marya Kalish and Laurence Olivier as Julian Rolfe.

== See also ==
- Der Gelbe Schein (English titles: The Yellow Ticket and The Devil's Pawn).
