= The Blood Red Tape of Charity =

1913 film

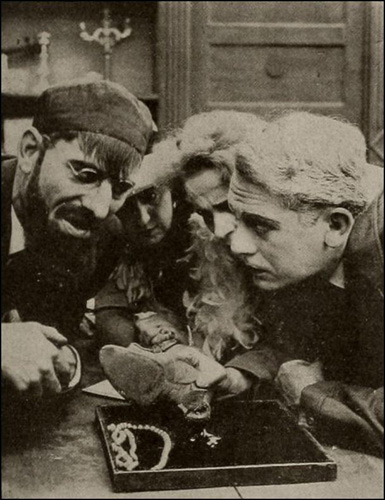
- A still from the lost film (Chaney is on the left)
- Directed by: Edwin August
- Written by: Edwin August
- Produced by: Pat Powers
- Starring: Edwin August; Unknown; Lon Chaney
- Distributed by: Universal Film Manufacturing Company
- Release date: September 26, 1913
- Running time: 1 reel (disputed)
- Country: United States
- Languages: Silent; English intertitles

The Blood Red Tape of Charity is a 1913 American silent short propaganda drama film written, directed and starring Edwin August and produced by Pat Powers. August wrote the scenario with the intent to highlight the evils of organized charity while entertaining the viewers. The film focuses on William Weldon, a telegraph lineman who is injured on the job and cannot work for several weeks. The family seeks aid from charity organizations, but "red tape" regulations prevent the family from receiving timely assistance. A gentleman thief named Marx decides to do one last job for the benefit of the family. He forces a doctor to treat the Weldon's invalid daughter Alice before proceeding to rob a charity ball's attendees. Marx pawns the stolen articles and saves the family before turning himself in to the police.

The film was released on September 26, 1913, and played in theaters throughout the United States. The unbilled cast list has been stated to include Lon Chaney in the role of the pawn broker. The Charity Organization Societies sought to produce a film to counter the negative portrayal of charities in The Blood Red Tape of Charity. P. L. Whitney stopped short of directly calling the film's portrayal dangerous, but advocated that charity members use the media to highlight the film's faults and exaggerations. Patricia Erens would use the surviving film still of the pawn broker, claimed to be Lon Chaney by scholars, as an example of Jewish character archetypes that were prominent in silent films. The film is now considered lost, with only a surviving still and the plot details available online.

== Synopsis ==
The film's plot survives because of Universal's publication of the details in Moving Picture News. The official description is as follows:

"Charity, through excessive organization, often defeats its own purpose. William Weldon, a telegraph lineman, is the father of a large family, and finds it a hard struggle to make ends meet on his small wages. By a fall from a telegraph pole one afternoon he sustains injuries which force a lay-off for several weeks. His family is left destitute and, after a time, seek aid from various charity organizations. In each case the organization promises to make a full investigation and do what they can, but by the time all the red tape and rules are complied with, the family would starve. In the meantime, Marx, a gentleman thief who has a secret retreat in the same building in which the Weldon family live, meets the invalid daughter, Alice Weldon. She tells him of the family's condition and Marx endeavors to aid her, although at the time he is out of ready cash himself. Taking desperate measures, he holds up a doctor and forces him to attend to Weldon's needs. Then, in company with the female leader of the gang, he attends the charity ball. There he makes a haul — plucking jewelry and trinkets from every one with whom he comes in contact. He pawns the stolen articles and uses the money to help the Weldons. After the family has recovered, through Marx's aid, the charity organizations finally send a few dollars and a skimpy supply of food. Marx decides to reform — in fact, his reformation has been intended for some time, and his last "job" was only the outcome of his desire to do a worthy charity. He goes to the police, declares himself, and surrenders. Marx is sentenced, and while sitting in his cell a vision of Alice appeared before him, repaying him for his sacrifice and charity."

== Cast ==
- Edwin August as Marx, a Gentleman Thief
- Unknown as William Weldon
- Lon Chaney as a Jewish pawnbroker

It is possible that Mary Charleston was a part of the cast due to Edwin August's having been noted as working with her in Powers' productions.

== Production ==
According to an interview with Dorothy Donnell, Edwin August wrote The Blood Red Tape of Charity with an intent on showing the evils of organized charity. He also directed the production.

Within months of completing this production, August would leave Universal. Donnell stated that August was tired of earning money for other people when he would make more under his own brand.

The film's cast and credits were unbilled and very few details emerged, but two scholars have claimed that it featured Lon Chaney. Jon Mirsalis states that Chaney has an unbilled part as a pawnbroker. Michael Blake notes that Chaney had a role in the film, but also states that the film had only one reel and lists the production code as 0119. Blake's claim that it was a single reel is the subject of dispute because the release was originally referred to as a two-reel production in publications and many advertisements. Indeed, Blake's book cites a review from "Moving Picture World" that stated "Edwin August has written a brilliant two-part drama along this theme....", but he doesn't state if a two-part movie means one or two reels.

== Release ==
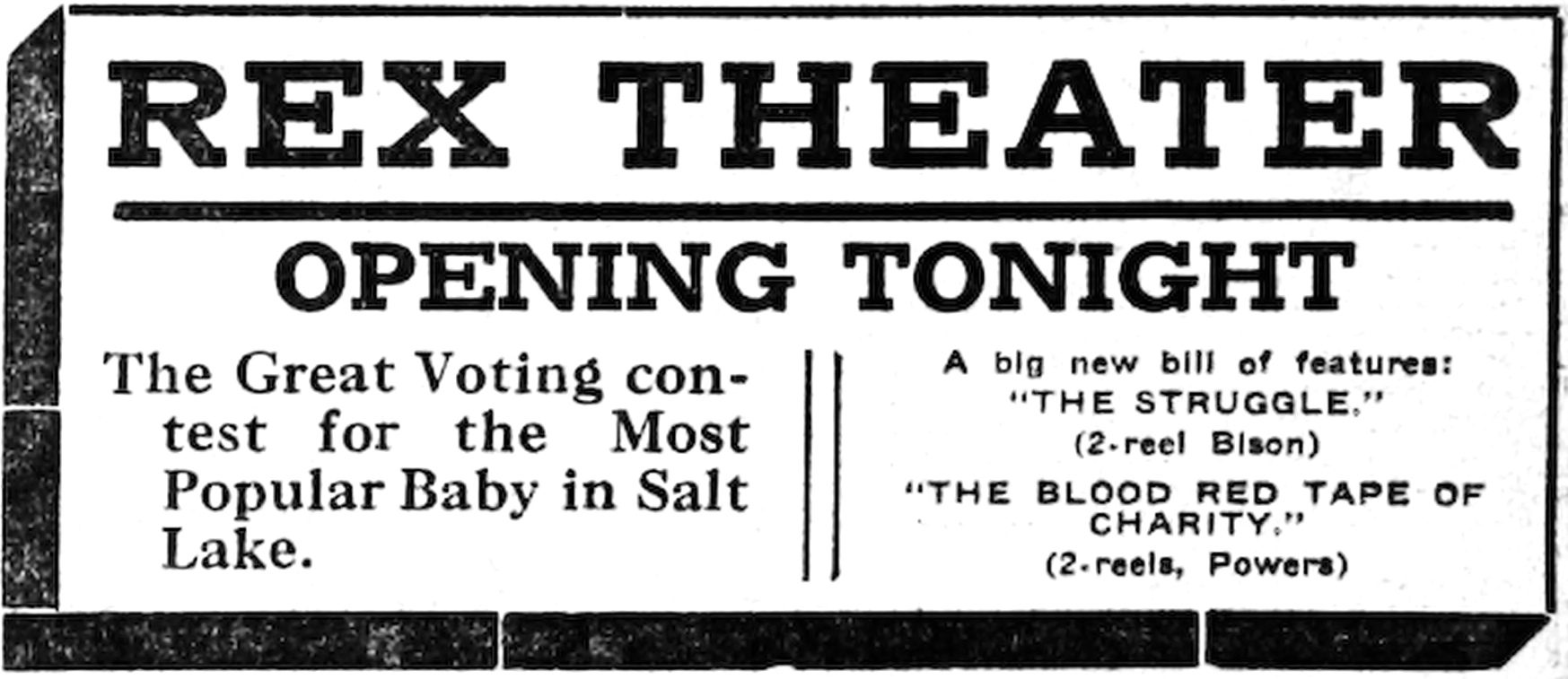
Contemporary newspaper advertising a double feature with The Blood Red Tape of Charity

The film was released on September 26, 1913, by Universal Film Manufacturing Company under the Powers label. On August 15, 1913, prior to the film's release, the Daily Capital Journal of Salem, Oregon contained a brief section on Edwin August which lists The Blood Red Tape of Charity as one of his latest successes. This occurred more than a month prior to the film's release, and is not known to have appeared in any other source or any known pre-release viewing event. After the film was released nationwide, advertisements for its viewing appeared in newspapers including in El Paso, Texas, Chicago, Illinois, Indiana, Iowa, Ohio, Nebraska, Kansas, and Pennsylvania.

== Reception ==
Jon C. Mirsalis's website cites a review in Moving Picture World which states, "There is considerable strength in the offering, but it has some bad faults. One of these is melodramatic and insincere acting. The photography is good and in spite of numerous absurdities the picture has strong moments." Descriptive ads for the film were often informative; an ad by the Crystal Theater indicates that August wrote and acted in the film, but also did not shy away from film's depiction of charity organizations and instead promoted the film's defining message as "Charity Organizations Pay Dearly for Incompetency". Another advertisement cites the New York World review detailing the propaganda film's intent to gain public attention to incite a "regeneration" of charitable organizations. An advertisement in the El Paso Herald by the Alamo Theater described the film as "a beautiful story of love, devotion and charity. It is a strong moral lesson and should appeal to the "charity workers" in this country." The advertisement also said the film would make viewers more charitable and good, but that the film's critique on charity workers in particular would be far from appealing or well received.

The film provoked a response by the Charity Organization Societies because of its melodramatic and exaggerated depiction of the family's suffering due to regulation delays. In its response to letters about the film, the Charity Organization Bulletin wished for a scenario to be written and produced to "give a true picture of the work done by organized charity." In the book The Charity Organization Movement in the United States: A Study in American Philanthropy, Volume 19, the film is said to be to an attack on organized charity by a distortion of the facts.

These characterizations were accurate, as August's intention to instruct and entertain audiences of the evils of organized charity makes The Blood Red Tape of Charity a propaganda film by definition.

Another response by P. L. Whitney, Extension Secretary of United Charities, stopped short of calling the film outright dangerous, but noted its intent and the "poetic justice" that surrounds the two secretaries, one of whom results in Marx postponing his retirement, and later takes their jewelry to provide for the family. Whitney advised the editor and readers to keep watch for the film and use the media to highlight its faults and exaggerations.

Patricia Erens used the film still of the pawnbroker, claimed by Mirsalis to be Lon Chaney, as an example of the common depictions of Jews in her book The Jew in American Cinema.
