= The Lesser Evil (1912 film) =

1912 film

- Directed by: D. W. Griffith
- Written by: George Hennessy
- Starring: Blanche Sweet; Edwin August
- Cinematography: G. W. Bitzer
- Distributed by: Biograph Company
- Release date: April 29, 1912
- Running time: 17 minutes
- Country: United States
- Language: Silent (English intertitles)

The Lesser Evil is a 1912 American short silent drama film directed by D. W. Griffith and starring Blanche Sweet. A print of the film survives.

== Cast ==
- Blanche Sweet as The Young Woman
- Edwin August as The Young Woman's Sweetheart
- Mae Marsh as The Young Woman's Companion
- Alfred Paget as The Leader of the Smugglers
- Charles Hill Mailes as The Revenue Officer / Policeman
- Charles West as The Go-Between
- William A. Carroll as In Smuggler Band
- Charles Gorman as In Smuggler Band
- Robert Harron as In Smuggler Band
- Harry Hyde as Policeman
- J. Jiquel Lanoe as In Smuggler Band
- Owen Moore (unconfirmed)
- Frank Opperman as In Smuggler Band
- Herbert Prior (unconfirmed)
- W. C. Robinson as In Smuggler Band

== See also ==
- List of American films of 1912
- D. W. Griffith filmography
- Blanche Sweet filmography
