= Martha Morton =

American dramatist

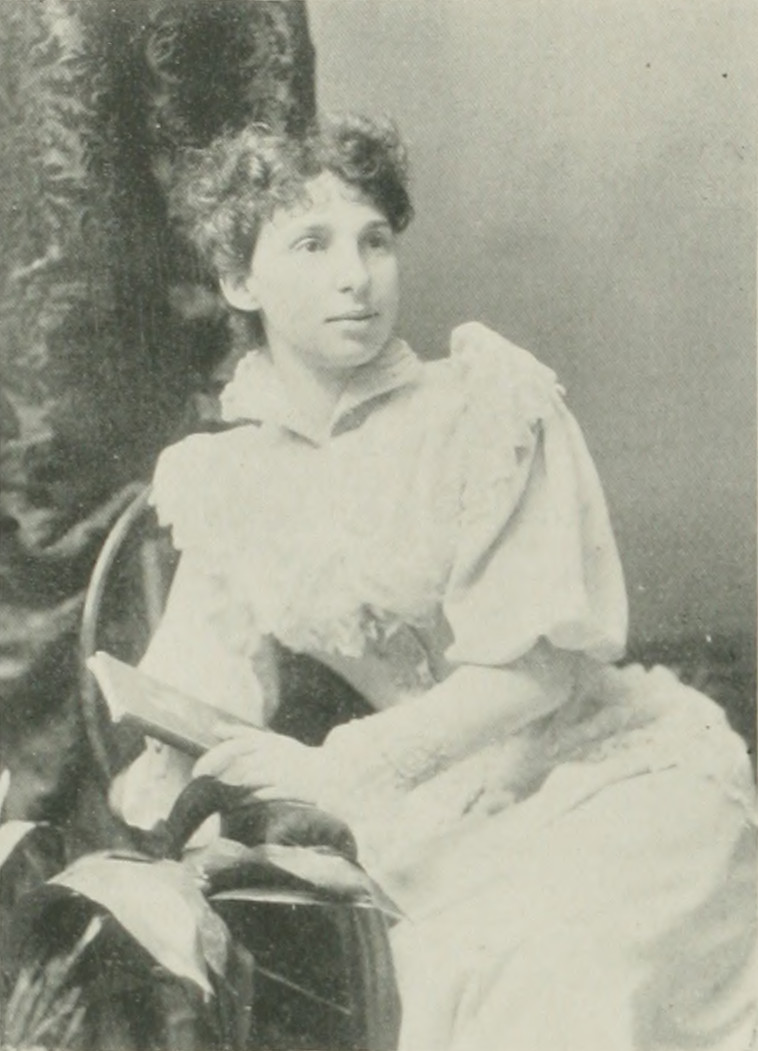
- Born: October 10, 1865; New York City, U.S.
- Died: February 18, 1925 (aged 59); New York City, U.S.
- Education: Hunter College
- Occupation: playwright
- Spouse: Hermann Conheim (m. 1897)
- Relatives: Michael Morton (brother)
- Writing career
- Language: English

Martha Morton (October 10, 1865 – February 18, 1925) was the first successful American woman to sustain a lengthy career as a professional playwright. Author of numerous plays, she founded the Society of Dramatic Authors, and helped open doors for other female theatre artists.

== Early years and education ==
Martha Morton was born in New York City on October 10, 1865, the brother of playwright Michael Morton. Raised partly in London and in New York City, she attended the Normal College (Hunter College). She began writing stories and poems at a young age, and found some early success in getting published.

== Career ==
When she was nineteen, in 1884 Morton wrote a parody of David Belasco's May Blossom, which Daniel Frohman used as a skit for a benefit production. Morton then penned a melodrama, Helene, staged in a benefit showing, followed by a two-week production in 1889; Clara Morris, an actress renowned for her emotive acting style, kept the melodrama in her repertoire for a number of years. Morton's next produced play, The Merchant, won first place and $5,000 in the New York World's playwriting contest, enjoying a seven-week run at the Madison Square Theatre in 1891. Four plays for comedian William H. Crane undoubtedly contributed to Morton's high earnings as a playwright; Crane toured the United States and played in New York: Brother John (1893), His Wife's Father (1895), A Fool of Fortune (1896), and The Senator Keeps House (1911).

At the age of twenty-one, she directed her first Broadway production, and became increasingly interested in "the role of women as active participants in solving problems of a national scope". Several successful female playwrights followed in Morton's footsteps, thanks to her unending encouragement. When she tried to join the American Dramatists Club, she was denied admission because she was a woman. As a result, she, along with other women dramatists, founded the Society of Dramatic Authors in 1907, which included thirty female members, and one male member. When members of the American Dramatists Club joined Morton's group, the cross-saturation eventually led to the joining of the two, called The Society of American Dramatists and Composers—forerunner of the Dramatists Guild of America.

On May 30, 1897, Morton's Helene opened the summer season at the Elitch Theatre with actor James O'Neill—father of the American playwright Eugene O'Neill—as the leading man.

Morton married Hermann Conheim in 1897 and died February 18, 1925, after a brief struggle with heart disease.

== Themes ==
She contributed to American theatre, serving as an example and encouraging younger women playwrights. Although most of her plays reflect the mode of her time and are not remembered today, she worked to express critical views on stage and to try different genres. One important achievement "was in her resolution to present women characters on stage who had the strength to be independent in thought and action". Eventually, Morton would go on to earn over US$1,000,000 for her plays.

== Selected works ==
- Hélène (1888)
- The Merchant (1891)
- Brother John (1893)
- His Wife's Father (1895)
- A Fool of Fortune (1896)
- A Bachelor's Romance (1897)
- The Diplomat (1902)
- Her Lord and Master (1902)
- The Movers (1907)
- On the Eve (1909)
