= Belle Taylor (screenwriter) =

American screenwriter

- Occupation: Screenwriter
- Years active: 1910–1914

Belle Taylor was a screenwriter who wrote silent short films for Biograph in the United States in the early 1910s.

== Selected filmography ==
- Her Father's Silent Partner (1914)
- A Welcome Intruder (1913)
- Love's Messenger (1912)
- Iola's Promise (1912)
- The Old Bookkeeper (1912)
- His Daughter (1911)
- A Wreath of Orange Blossoms (1911)
- A Child's Stratagem (1910)
- The Broken Doll (1910)
