= Body and Soul (1931 film) =

1931 film

- Theatrical release poster
- Directed by: Alfred Santell
- Written by: Jules Furthman
- Based on: play Squadrons by Elliott White Springs and A. E. Thomas
- Produced by: William Fox
- Starring: Charles Farrell; Elissa Landi; Humphrey Bogart; Myrna Loy
- Cinematography: Glen MacWilliams
- Edited by: Paul Weatherwax
- Music by: Peter Brunelli; George Lipschultz (uncredited)
- Production company: Fox Film Corporation
- Distributed by: Fox Film Corporation
- Release date: February 22, 1931
- Running time: 70 minutes
- Country: United States
- Language: English

Body and Soul is a 1931 American Pre-Code action drama film directed by Alfred Santell and starring Charles Farrell, Elissa Landi, Humphrey Bogart, and Myrna Loy. The story, adapted from the stage play Squadrons by Elliott White Springs and A.E. Thomas, depicts Royal Air Force pilots in World War I. (Note: Body and Soul was Bogart's third credited screen appearance.)

== Plot ==
In World War I, American pilots Mal Andrews, Tap Johnson, and Jim Watson enroll in a Royal Air Force squadron. Mal and Tap are worried that their friend Jim is cheating on his new bride. When General Trafford Jones arrives to evaluate the squadron, he criticizes its lack of discipline and poor effort in aerial battles. Consequently, the general orders Watson to undertake a near-suicidal mission to shoot down an enemy balloon for his first flight with the squadron. Secretly, Mal joins him aboard the aircraft and when Jim is killed in the air battle, his friend manages to complete the mission and make it look as if the dead pilot was a hero.

At the base, Jim's wife Carla is mistaken for "Pom Pom," his mistress. Mal falls in love with Carla and when Alice Lester, the real "Pom Pom", appears, she finds out that Tap is about to fly a mission. Lester is a German spy who sends the information to the enemy; Tap is killed as a result. When Mal realizes that Carla is Jim's widow and not his mistress, he sets off on another mission, with the hope that he will return to his true love.

== Cast ==
- Charles Farrell as Mal Andrews
- Elissa Landi as Carla (Note: Landi made her American film debut in the film.)
- Humphrey Bogart as Jim Watson
- Myrna Loy as Alice Lester ("Pom Pom")
- Don Dillaway as Tap Johnson
- Crauford Kent as Major Burke
- Pat Somerset as Major Knowls
- Ian MacLaren as General Trafford-Jones
- David Cavendish as Lieutenant Meggs (Dennis D'Auburn)

== Production ==
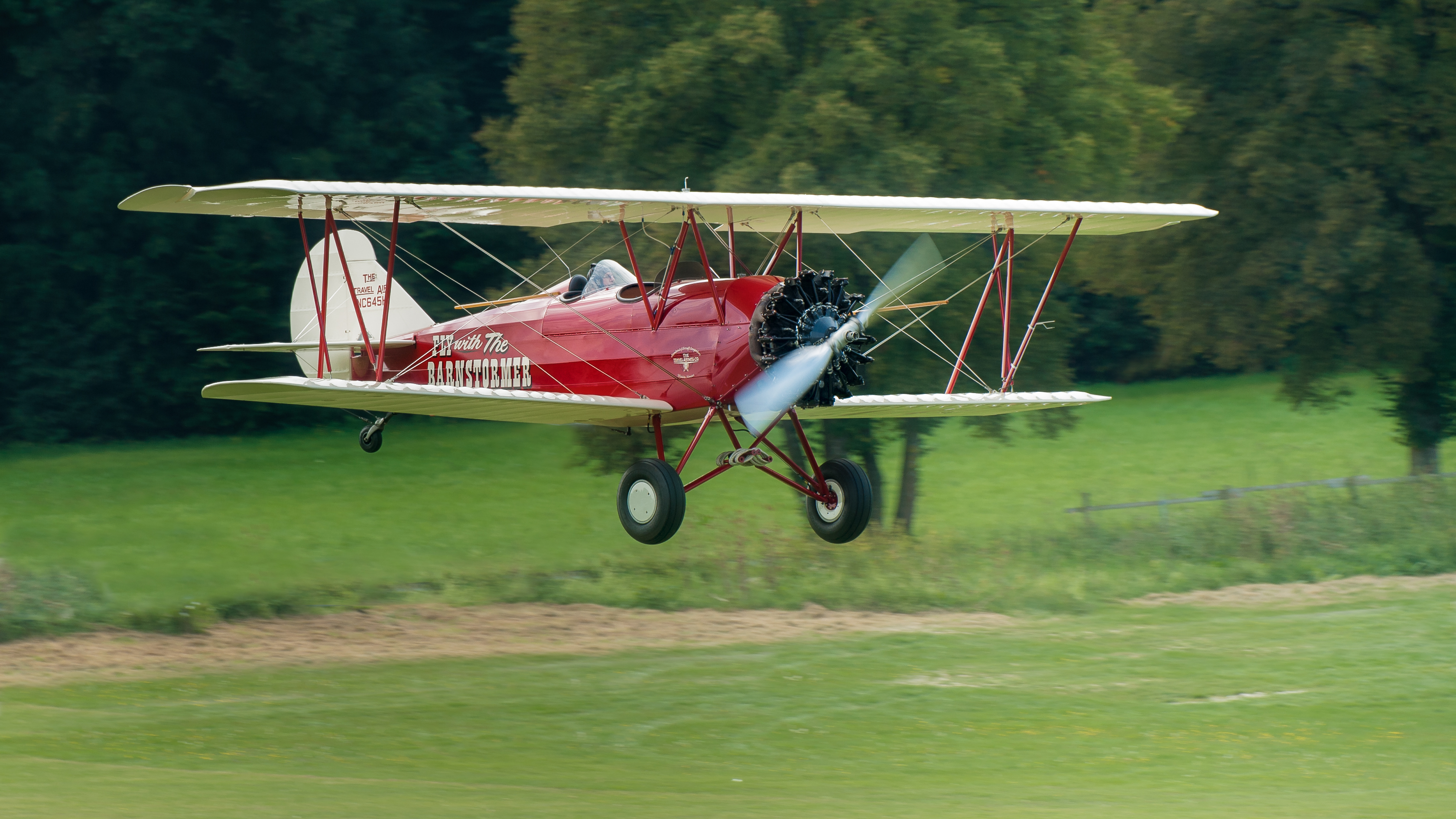
The Travel Air 4000 such as the example used in Body and Soul was often employed in movies as it approximated the "look" of a World War I aircraft.

Body and Soul began location shooting on November 29, 1930, at the Russell Movie Ranch in Agoura, California, with a modicum of flying. A Travel Air 4000 biplane that had been flown in Hell's Angels (1930), disguised as a British World War I fighter aircraft, was the only actual aircraft acquired for the production. A combination of flying sequences, matched to sound stage process shots at the studio where the Travel Air was again used, completed the aerial scenes. Production wrapped up on January 2, 1931.

== Reception ==
The main attraction of Body and Soul was in the drama and the introduction of Elissa Landi to North American audiences. In Mordaunt Hall's review for The New York Times, he noted: "There are several effective flying episodes, but after all, the whole production hinges on the excellent portrayal of Elissa Landi." He also praised other actors: "Myrna Loy does well with the minor role of Alice Lester. Humphrey Bogart is earnest as Jim Watson, and Donald Dillaway acquits himself favorably as the valorous Tap Johnson."
