= His Daughter =

1911 film directed by D. W. Griffith

- Directed by: D. W. Griffith
- Written by: Belle Taylor
- Starring: Edwin August
- Cinematography: G. W. Bitzer
- Distributed by: Biograph Company
- Release date: February 23, 1911
- Running time: 17 minutes
- Country: United States
- Language: Silent (English intertitles)

His Daughter is a 1911 American silent short drama film directed by D. W. Griffith, starring Edwin August and featuring Blanche Sweet.

== Cast ==
- Edwin August as William Whittier
- Florence Barker as Mary
- Linda Arvidson
- Wilfred Lucas
- Mack Sennett
- Blanche Sweet

== See also ==
- D. W. Griffith filmography
- Blanche Sweet filmography
