= Alibi (play) =

Play written by Michael Morton

- Front cover of the 1929; Samuel French Ltd. Acting Edition
- Original language: English
- Written by: Michael Morton, from a novel by Agatha Christie

Premiere
- Date: 15 May 1928
- Place: United Kingdom

Alibi is a 1928 play by Michael Morton based on The Murder of Roger Ackroyd, a 1926 novel by British crime writer Agatha Christie.

It opened at the Prince of Wales Theatre in London's West End on 15 May 1928, starring Charles Laughton as Hercule Poirot. It was deemed a success and ran for 250 performances closing on 7 December 1928. It was the first work of Agatha Christie's to be presented on stage and the first adaptation of one of her works for any medium outside of her books. Retitled The Fatal Alibi, the play was first presented on Broadway in February 1932; the production was directed by Laughton, who reprised the role of Poirot.

== Background ==
Set used for Acts I and II of 1928 London production. Sir Roger Ackroyd's study (with open doors) where the murder takes place is seen at rear centre of set

Christie disagreed with the change of her favourite character Caroline Sheppard, the inspiration for Miss Marple, into a beautiful girl called Caryl Sheppard. She only permitted this change because the alternative was turning Poirot into a young man called Beau Poirot and having "lots of girls in love with him".

== Synopsis ==
The residents of Fernley Park, the home of Sir Roger Ackroyd, discuss the suicide of a local woman, Mrs. Ashley Ferrars, during the previous night. Ms. Ferrars had a close relationship with Sir Roger and her death has greatly affected him. They further discuss the impending announcement of the engagement between Sir Roger's daughter-in-law Flora and Ralph Paton. An attractive neighbor, Caryl Sheppard, arrives to play bridge, followed by Hercule Poirot, who has recently moved to the village. Caryl invites Poirot to dine with her at Fernley that evening with her and her brother, Dr. James Sheppard.

When Dr. Sheppard arrives, he and Ackroyd discuss the late Mrs. Ferrars. Ackroyd had planned to marry Mrs. Ferrars after she had finished mourning her late husband's death. After putting him off for three more months, she confessed to having poisoned him. She was driven to suicide by an unknown blackmailer. Ackroyd is certain that she would have left him a letter detailing who her persecutor was. That night, after everyone has gone to bed, Ackroyd is stabbed with a dagger through the neck, with only his own prints on the handle.

Dr. Sheppard tells Poirot of the real cause of Mrs. Ferrars' suicide and the letter that Sir Roger received. Ackroyd's secretary Geoffrey Raymond tells Poirot that at 9.30, he heard Ackroyd tell some unknown person that he could not give them money. Houseguest Major Blunt also says he heard the words when he was walking on the terrace, but was distracted by a woman in white moving about the grounds. The woman turns out to be parlourmaid Ursula Bourne, who is secretly married to Ralph Paton.

The next morning, Poirot summons the butler, Parker, and asks him to state what is different about the study compared to the previous evening. Raymond is questioned about any strangers seen in the past week. The only one he can recall was a young representative from a firm of Dictaphone manufacturers. Mr Hammond, the family solicitor, reveals that the dead man's will leaves the majority of the estate to Paton. It is also revealed that £100 cash is missing from Ackroyd's room. Four days later, Flora confesses that she stole the money. Blunt, in love with Flora, chivalrously claims the money was given to him by Sir Roger but Poirot tells the Major that Flora was going to marry him to escape her and her mother's poverty.

The next night, Poirot gathers all the suspects and, after revealing Bourne's marriage to Paton, proceeds to discredit Paton's alibi. Poirot tells the assembled group that in order to save Paton, the real murderer must confess. They have until midday tomorrow and then Poirot will go to the police. After everyone leaves, Poirot fetches back Dr. Sheppard and accuses him of the crime. He reveals that when Blunt and Raymond heard the voice of Ackroyd heard refusing a blackmail request, they were in fact listening to a previously made Dictaphone recording. The murderer then removed the Dictaphone from the scene. The murderer can only be someone who had a receptacle to carry away the machine and who had the study to himself for a moment after the discovery of the body – in other words, Dr. Sheppard himself. The doctor's motive was to protect himself – he was Mrs Ferrars' blackmailer. Poirot suggests that the doctor take the "cleanest" way out; Sheppard agrees and leaves. Poirot tells Caryl that he has failed to catch the murderer, but that he is able to clear Ralph.

== Reception of London production ==
The review in The Times issue of 16 May 1928 questioned "whether you can make a play out of theoretical analysis" and went on to praise Laughton's performance as Poirot. "If we do not weary of Poirot shooting questions to left and right, Poirot with uplifted finger expounding his views to a half-circle of listeners, it is because Mr. Charles Laughton, with a little help from the text, makes a personality out of the fat and sentimental little ratiocinator." The review stated that Lady Tree had no scope within the part given to her to invest the part of Mrs. Ackroyd with personality but "competence was all that was demanded from her, and from the rest of the cast, and it was generally forthcoming. One actor singled out for praise was Henry Daniell for his "imperturbably natural butler" however his "mystery...was not...analysed enough".

The Guardian of 16 May 1928 expressed similar sentiments, saying "we can hardly resist the play despite its wheezy start and inability to accelerate, because M. Poirot is presented in the flesh by Mr. Charles Laughton, who, unlike much youth of brilliant hopes, continues to perform almost more than he so lavishly promised".

The review in The Observer of 20 May 1928 was laudatory about the performances of J.H. Roberts and Charles Laughton. About Roberts, the reviewer said, "If ever a man succeeded by his performance in throwing an audience of determined sleuths off the scent, Mr. Roberts threw those members of the first-night audience who had not read Mrs. Christie's clever novel off it." About Laughton, the reviewer said, "He seizes the stage and firmly controls the audience. He fills me with a sense of his power, and makes me intensely aware of him from the moment he comes on to the stage until the moment he leaves it. He is an actor."
On the play in general, the reviewer did say it, "begins badly but steadily improves; the first two scenes, which are dull and slow, might be telescoped. Mr. Morton, indeed, had a difficult job to perform in dramatising the novel, for the cleverness of Mrs. Christie's story lies not so much in the plot as in the fact that it is told by the murderer. Mr. Laughton, however, added so much to the part of Poirot that they play seemed far bigger than it is." This reviewer, unlike the others quoted, did state that the rest of the cast was also "excellent".

The Scotsman of 16 May 1928 said, "It is a tribute to Mr Michael Morton…that during the play…one completely ignored the many weaknesses in the chain of evidence that bought the guilt home to the murderer of Sir Roger Ackroyd." They called Alibi "one of the best of its kind" and, like the others, praised Laughton's performance as Poirot.

The Daily Mirror of 16 May 1928 said of Charles Laughton's performance that, "He has that force of personality which invests his every word or movement with interest. He imparts too, a sense of reality and impending drama, to the process of cross-examining various persons. Sir Gerald du Maurier has produced the piece according to that modern fashion in which people move quietly, behave credibly and often sit with their backs to the audience when speaking."

== Credits of London production ==
Agatha Christie's novel was adapted for the stage by Michael Morton. The production was directed by Gerald du Maurier.

=== Cast ===
- Charles Laughton as Hercule Poirot
- Lady Beerbohm Tree as Mrs. Ackroyd
- Jane Welsh as Flora Ackroyd
- Henry Daniell as Parker
- Basil Loder as Major Blunt
- Iris Noel as Ursula Bourne
- Henry Forbes-Robertson as Geoffrey Raymond
- Gillian Lind as Caryl Sheppard
- J. H. Roberts as Doctor Sheppard
- Cyril Nash as Ralph Paton
- Norman V. Norman as Sir Roger Ackroyd, Bt
- John Darwin as Inspector Davies
- J. Smith Wright as Mr. Hammond
- Constance Anderson as Margot

== Broadway production ==
Laughton also starred in and directed the Broadway production, retitled The Fatal Alibi which opened at the Booth Theatre on 9 February 1932 with settings by Dale Stetson and produced by Jed Harris. It was not a success and played for only 24 performances, closing 27 February 1932.

Brooks Atkinson of The New York Times reviewed the play in its issue of 10 February 1932 when he claimed that, "the minuteness of the facts involved and the meticulousness of the play construction make The Fatal Alibi a rather difficult crime play to follow in the theatre". He further said that the cast was "excellent" and singled out Laughton's performance as "an immensely entertaining exercise in poster portraiture", however, "Since Mr. Laughton enjoys playing the part, a guileless theatregoer may enjoy watching him. But colorful acting, slightly detached from the flow of narrative, can also temper a drama's illusion. In the opinion of this department, Mr. Laughton's lithographic performing has that subtle effect. It diverts attention from the play."

=== Credits ===
Script amendments for Jed Harris's Broadway production were by John Anderson. Charles Laughton directed.

==== Cast ====
- Charles Laughton as Hercule Poirot
- Effie Shannon as Mrs. Ackroyd
- Jane Wyatt as Flora Ackroyd
- Donald Randolph as Parker
- Kenneth Hunter as Major Blunt
- Jane Bramley as Bourne
- Edward Crandall as Geoffrey Raymond
- Helen Vinson as Caryl Sheppard
- Moffat Johnston as Doctor Sheppard
- Lowell Gilmore as Captain Ralph Paton
- Lionel Pape as Sir Roger Ackroyd
- Lawrence H. Cecil as Inspector Davies
- Fothringham Lysons as Mr. Hammond
- Andree Cordy as Margot

== Publication history ==
The play was first published as a Samuel French Acting Edition (No. 1177) in January 1930 (copyright 1929).

== Adaptations ==
In 1931, a film adaptation of the play, entitled Alibi, was produced by Twickenham Studios in England. Austin Trevor starred as Hercule Poirot.

A radio version of the play was presented on the BBC Home Service on 17 June 1944 from 9.20 to 10.35pm as part of the Saturday Night Theatre strand. The play was adapted for broadcasting by Marjorie Pratt and produced by Howard Rose.
