= B. F. Zeidman =

American film producer (1896–1970)

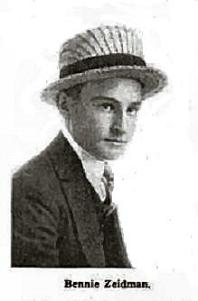
- The Moving Picture World, (July 29, 1916)
- Born: Benjamin F. Zeidman; October 4, 1896; Philadelphia
- Died: August 7, 1970 (aged 73); Los Angeles
- Other name: Bennie Zeidman
- Occupations: Hollywood Publicist and Film Producer

B. F. Zeidman (October 4, 1896 – August 7, 1970) was a Hollywood film producer whose long film career began while he was still in his teens during the era of silent film.

== Early life ==
He was born Benjamin "Bennie" Zeidman at Philadelphia, the middle of five children raised by Joseph and Clara Zeidman. Bennie's birth-mother most likely died sometime around the turn of the century leaving his father to wed Clara about 1902. His father was Russian, as were his mother and step-mother, and supported his family as an owner of a Philadelphia area butcher shop.

== Career ==
As early as 1911 Bennie was doing publicity for Lubin Studios, and had gained the nickname "Bennie of Lubinville." In 1914 Zeidman worked as publicity manager for the Liberty Motion Picture Company, and then for Eaco Films in New York. Over the next several years he would work as publicist for D. W. Griffith, Fine Arts Films, Yorke-Metro Studios, and Douglas Fairbanks. In 1922 he produced the film Where Is My Wandering Boy Tonight?, and would go on to produce or co-produce some twenty-six films over the following twenty-two years including Prison Train, Grand Central Murder, and the 1936 documentary Beneath the Seas. His last two productions were the Laurel and Hardy films Air Raid Wardens and Nothing But Trouble.

At 101 pounds and just under five feet, Zeidman was once described as the "smallest press agent in captivity".

== Death ==
Bennie Zeidman died in 1970 at the age of 73 in Los Angeles.

== Filmography ==
=== As producer ===
- Nothing But Trouble (1944)
- Air Raid Wardens (1943)
- The Youngest Profession (1943)
- Grand Central Murder (1942)
- Pacific Rendezvous (1942)
- Leopard Men of Africa (1940)
- The Adventures of the Masked Phantom (1939)
- Prison Train (1938)
- Sweetheart of the Navy (1937)
- Girl Loves Boy (1937)
- White Legion (1936)
- In His Steps (1936)
- Beneath the Sea (1936)
- Straight from the Heart (1935)
- I've Been Around (1935)
- Wake Up and Dream (1934)
- I Give My Love (1934)
- Let's Talk It Over (1934)
- Glamour (1934)
- Beloved (1934)
- Samarang (1933)
- Renegades of the West (1932)
- Trailing the Killer (1932)
- Hell's House (1932)
- Daughters of Pleasure (1924)
- The Good Bad Boy (1924)
- Daring Youth (1924)
- Bright Lights of Broadway (1923)
- Where's My Wandering Boy Tonight? (1922)

=== As actor ===
- The Mystery of the Leaping Fish (1916) as Scenario Editor
- A Practical Demonstration(1914) as The Office Boy
- His Wife's Mother (1912)
- The Office Favorite (1912) as Jimmie Watkins - the Office Boy

=== As editor ===
- The Fleet's In (1928)
- Just Married (1928)

=== As writer ===
- Figures Don't Lie (1927)
