= The Yellow Passport =

1916 film by Edwin August

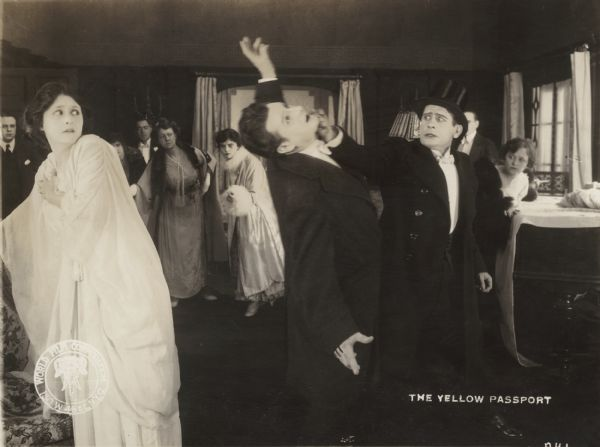
- Still of Clara Kimball Young reacting to Edwin August punching John St. Polis
- Directed by: Edwin August
- Written by: Abraham S. Schomer (author); Frances Marion (scenario); Edwin August (scenario)
- Based on: The Yellow Ticket by Michael Morton
- Starring: Clara Kimball Young
- Cinematography: Philip Hatkin
- Production company: World Film
- Distributed by: World Film
- Release date: February 7, 1916
- Running time: 5 reels
- Country: United States
- Language: Silent (English intertitles)

The Yellow Passport is a lost 1916 silent film drama produced and distributed by the World Film Company. Based on Michael Morton's 1914 Broadway play of the same title, it was directed by Edwin August and starred Clara Kimball Young. On the stage the lead characters were played by Florence Reed and John Barrymore. Morton's story was filmed several times in the silent era and made as The Yellow Ticket in 1931 with Lionel Barrymore and Elissa Landi.

A rerelease title for this film was The Badge of Shame.

== Plot ==
Sonia Sokoloff, a young Jewish girl in the Russian Empire, is forced to pretend to be a prostitute to obtain a passport (a "yellow ticket") in order to visit her father, whom she believes to be ill. When she arrives in Petrograd, she learns that her father has been killed. She encounters a young journalist and tells him about injustices the government has kept him from learning about.

== Cast ==
- Clara Kimball Young as Sonia Sokoloff
- Edwin August as Adolph Rosenheimer
- John St. Polis as Fedia
- Alec B. Francis as Myron Abram
- John W. Boyle as Carl Rosenheimer
- Mrs. David Landau as Mrs. Rosenheimer
- Edward Kimball as David Sokoloff
- Mrs. E.M. Kimball as Mrs. Sokoloff
- Thomas Charles as Fiodor
- Florence Hackett as Akulena, Fiodor's Wife
- Silas Feinberg as Alex Sokoloff
- Robert Cummings as Ivan
- Nicholas Dunaew as Music Master
- Adolph Lestina as Chief of Police

== See also ==
- The Yellow Ticket (1918 film)
- The Yellow Ticket (1931 film)
