= The Yellow Ticket (1931 film) =

1931 film directed by Raoul Walsh

- Film poster
- Directed by: Raoul Walsh
- Written by: Guy Bolton; Jules Furthman; Michael Morton
- Produced by: Raoul Walsh
- Starring: Elissa Landi; Lionel Barrymore; Laurence Olivier
- Cinematography: James Wong Howe
- Edited by: Jack Murray
- Music by: Carli Elinor; R. H. Bassett; Hugo Friedhofer
- Distributed by: Fox Film Corporation
- Release date: October 30, 1931
- Running time: 88 minutes
- Country: United States
- Language: English

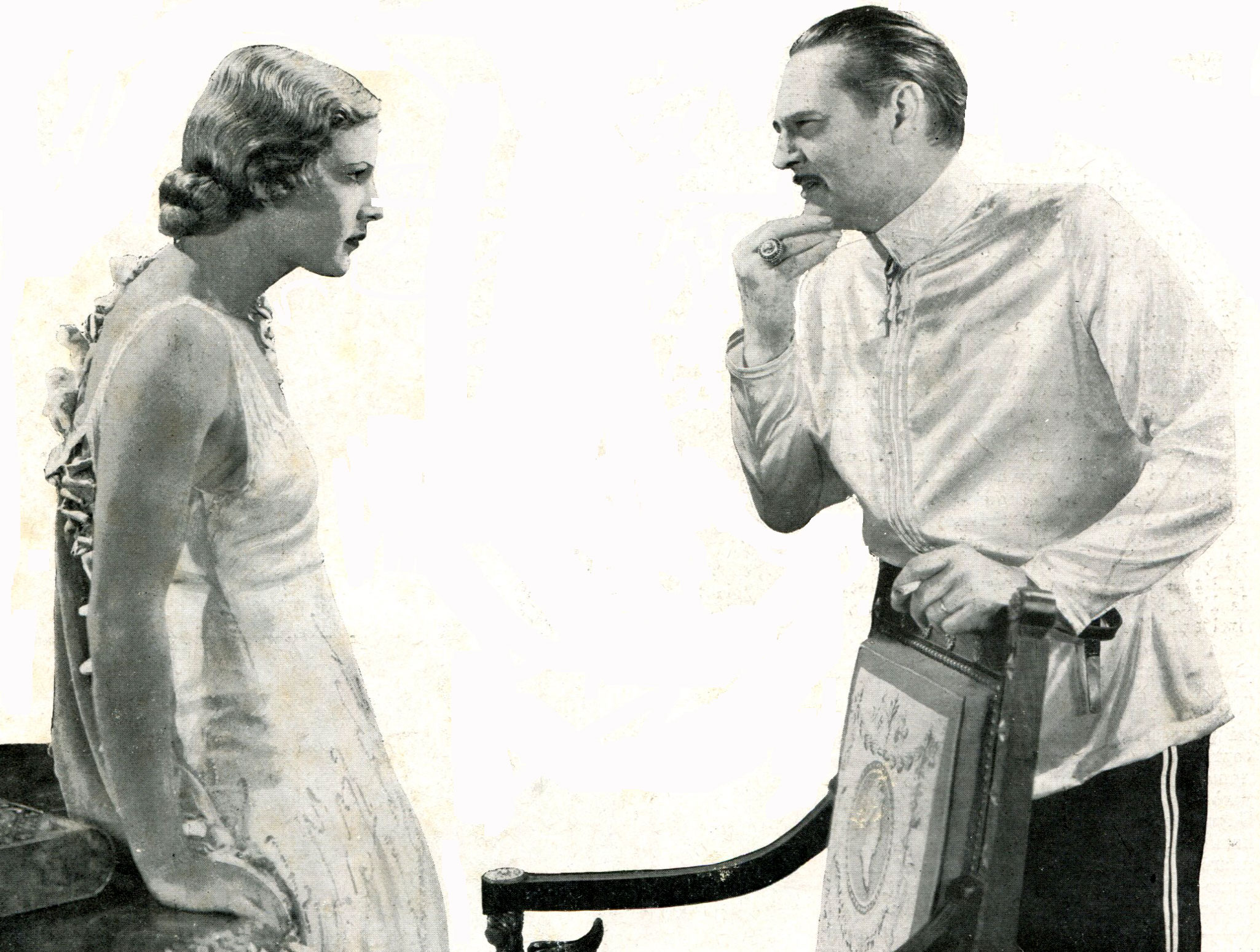
Elissa Landi and Lionel Barrymore

The Yellow Ticket is a 1931 pre-Code American drama film based on the 1914 play of the same name by Michael Morton, produced by the Fox Film Corporation, directed by Raoul Walsh, and starring Elissa Landi, Lionel Barrymore and Laurence Olivier. Boris Karloff appears briefly in a small supporting role. The picture is also a noteworthy example of productions from the pre-Code era in that it includes brief nudity.

The original play, presented on Broadway, ran from January to June 1914 and starred Lionel's younger brother John Barrymore opposite Florence Reed. This film is the third American adaptation of the play. The first two are The Yellow Passport from 1916 and The Yellow Ticket from 1918. A German version, Der Gelbe Schein, was also filmed and released in 1918.

== Plot ==
When martial law is declared in Russia, all Jews are restricted to their villages. The authorities are unsympathetic to Marya, who desperately wants to travel to St. Petersburg to see her dying father. Marya learns that a special card, called "the yellow ticket", is issued to prostitutes and allows them to travel freely.

Marya manages to get a yellow ticket. In St. Petersburg, Baron Andrey, a corrupt police official, prevents his lecherous nephew, Captain Nikolai, from forcing himself on Marya. She later meets Julian, a British journalist, and tells him about injustices the government has kept him from learning about, including the yellow ticket. When Julian's articles are published, Andrey, a womanizer, guesses that Marya has been giving him information.

== Cast ==
- Elissa Landi as Marya Kalish
- Lionel Barrymore as Baron Igor Andrey
- Laurence Olivier as Julian Rolfe
- Walter Byron as Count Nikolai
- Arnold Korff as Grandfather Kalish
- Mischa Auer as Melchior
- Edwin Maxwell as Police Agent
- Rita La Roy as Fania Rubinstein
- Sarah Padden as Mother Kalish
- Boris Karloff as Orderly
- Henry Kolker as Officer at checkpoint (uncredited)

== See also ==
- The Black Pass (Czarna ksiazeczka, a 1915 lost Polish short by Aleksander Hertz also with Pola Negri)
