= Elissa Landi =

Italian actress (1904–1948)

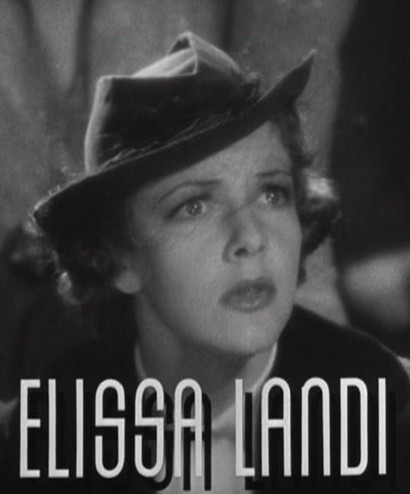
- Trailer for After the Thin Man (1936)
- Born: Elizabeth Marie Christine von Kühnelt; December 6, 1904; Venice, Italy
- Died: October 21, 1948 (aged 43); Kingston, New York, U.S.
- Occupation: Actress
- Years active: 1926–1943
- Spouse(s): John Cecil Lawrence (m. 1928; div. 1936); Curtis Kinney Thomas (1905-2002) (m. 1943)
- Children: 1

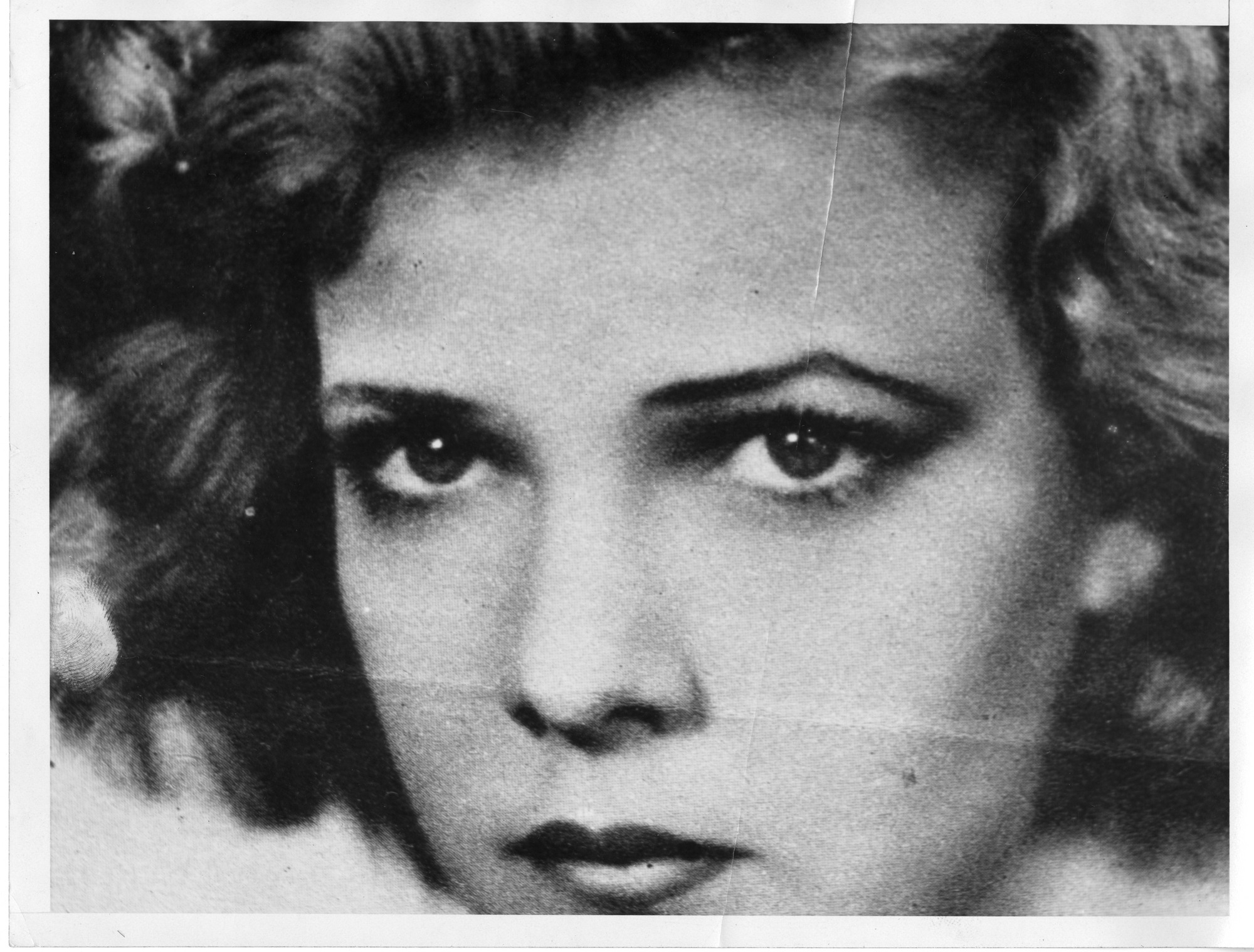
Landi in 1932

Elissa Landi (born Elisabeth Marie Christine von Kühnelt; December 6, 1904 – October 21, 1948) was an Austrian-American actress born in Venice, who was popular as a performer in Hollywood films of the 1920s and 1930s. She "claims descent from Empress Elizabeth of Austria-Hungary", and was noted for her alleged aristocratic bearing.

== Biography ==
Landi was born Elizabeth Marie Christine von Kühnelt in Venice, Italy, to Austrian Richard Kühnelt and his wife Caroline (later, "Countess Caroline Zanardi Landi"). She was raised in the village of Kleinhart in Lower Austria near Vienna until the divorce of her parents. Later on she was educated in England. From 1928 to 1936, she was married to John Cecil Lawrence, and from 1943 to 1948 to Curtis Kinney Thomas.

Landi's first ambition was to be an author. She wrote her first novel at the age of twenty, and returned to writing during lulls in her acting career. She debuted on stage in Dandy Dick (1923). She joined the Oxford Repertory Company at an early age, and appeared in many successful British and American stage productions. In 1926 she starred in Dorothy Brandon's Blind Alley in the West End.

During the 1920s she appeared in British, French, and German films before traveling to the United States to appear in a Broadway production of A Farewell to Arms (1930). Her other Broadway credits included Empress of Destiny (1938), Apology (1943), and Dark Hammock (1944).

She was signed to a contract by Fox Film Corporation (later 20th Century Fox) in 1931. She was paired successfully with some of the major leading men, including David Manners, Charles Farrell, Warner Baxter, and Ronald Colman, in romantic dramas such as Body and Soul (1931, which also featured Humphrey Bogart).

In 1931, she starred in the Fox feature The Yellow Ticket along with a young Laurence Olivier, Lionel Barrymore, and Boris Karloff. Raoul Walsh directed. The film was based on Michael Morton's 1914 play and was about a young Jewish girl who obtains a prostitute's passport during a period when Jews were not allowed such freedom so that she can travel in Czarist Russia to visit her sick father.

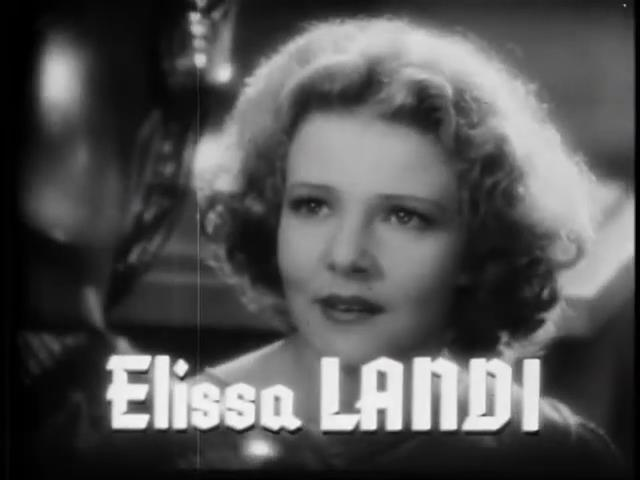
Trailer for The Sign of the Cross (1932)

Fox lent her to Paramount in 1932 to play Mercia, the female lead in Cecil B. DeMille's The Sign of the Cross adapted from the play of the same name. DeMille said he chose her for the role because "[t]here is the depth of the ages in her eyes, today in her body and tomorrow in her spirit."

Landi traveled with Katharine Hepburn.

She starred in the box office hit The Count of Monte Cristo (1934) with Robert Donat.

Her contract with Fox was abruptly cancelled in 1936 when she refused a particular role. Metro-Goldwyn-Mayer signed her, and after a couple of romantic dramas, she played the cousin of Myrna Loy in After the Thin Man (1936). She retired from acting in 1943, after making only two more films.

Landi became a naturalized U.S. citizen in 1943 and dedicated herself to writing, producing six novels and a series of poems. She had published her first novel as early as age nineteen. She continued writing novels at the height of her movie fame and for the rest of her short life.

She died from cancer in Kingston, New York, at age 43 and was buried at Oak Hill Cemetery in Newburyport, Massachusetts.

Landi has a star on the Hollywood Walk of Fame for her contributions to Motion Pictures, at 1611 Vine Street.

== Filmography ==
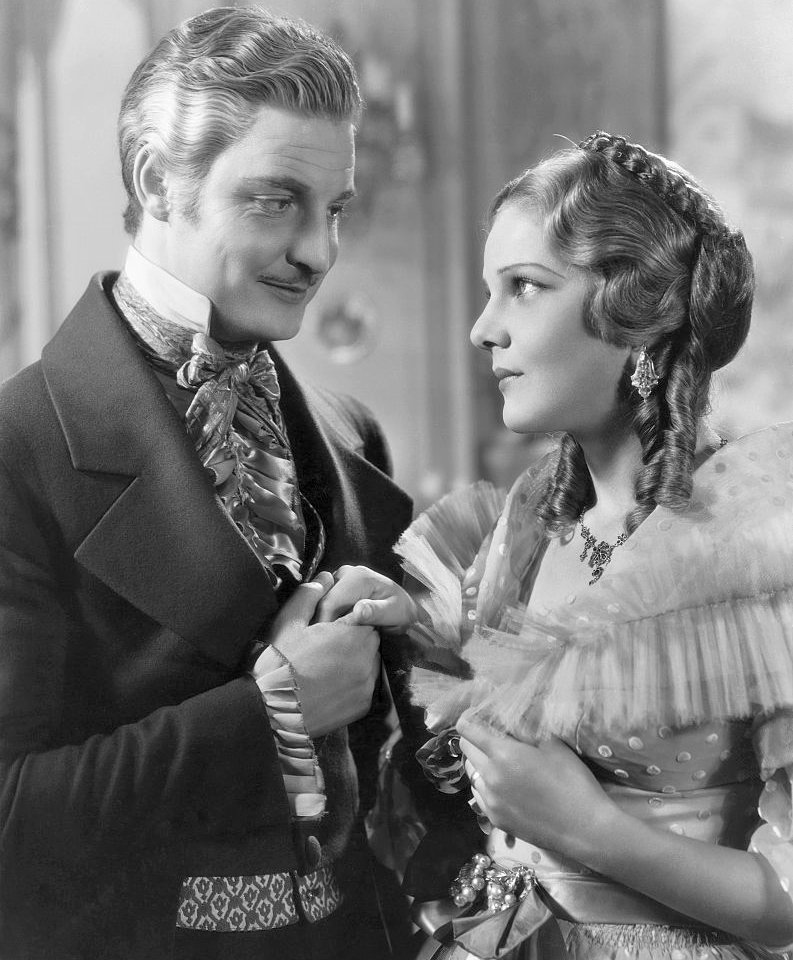
Robert Donat and Landi in The Count of Monte Cristo (1934)

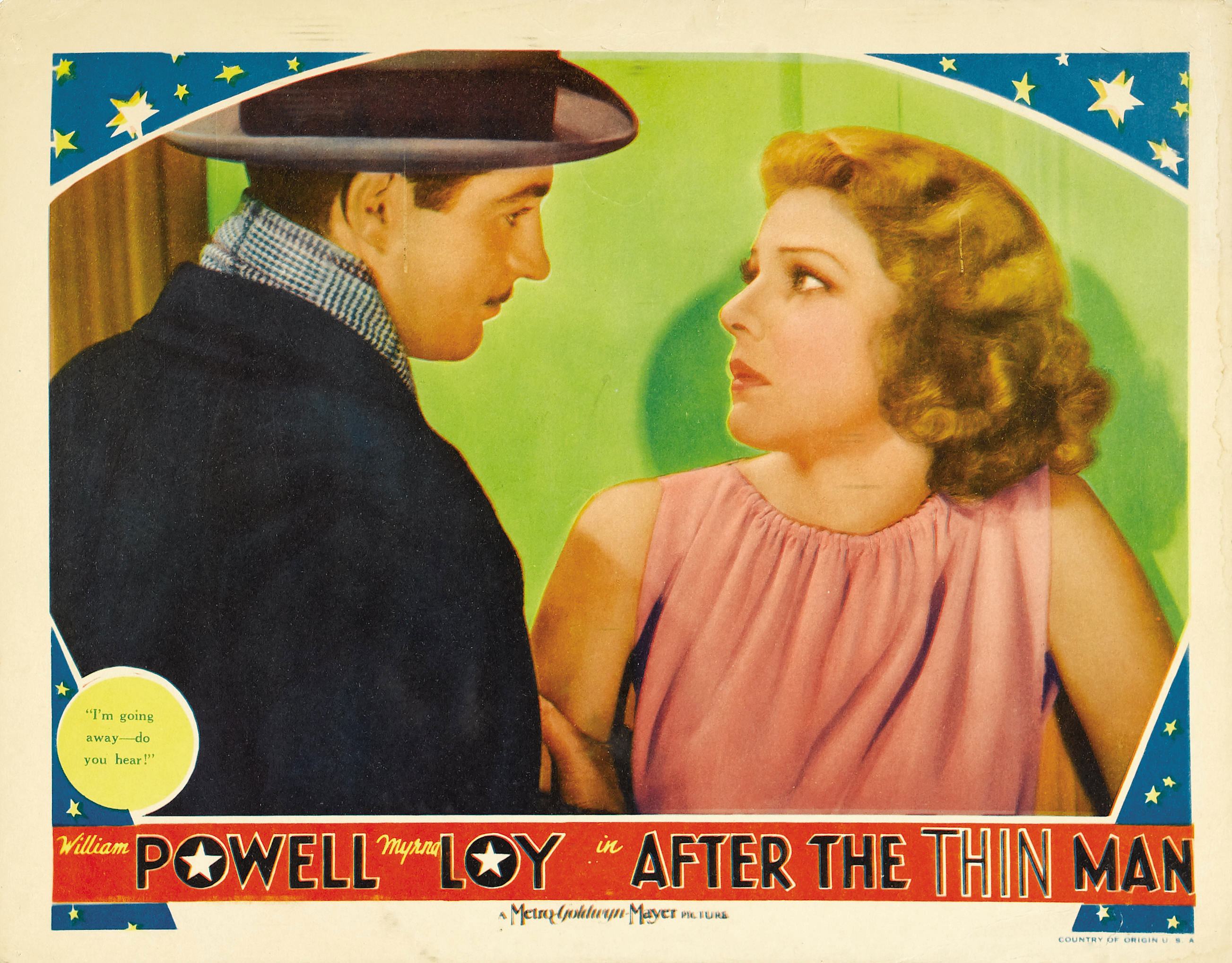
Lobby card for After the Thin Man (1936)

Year	Film	Role	Director	Notes
1926	London	Alice Cranston	Herbert Wilcox	Lost film
1928	Bolibar	Françoise-Marie / La Monita	Walter Summers	
1928	Underground	Nell	Anthony Asquith	
1928	Sin	Jeanne, Gérard's Wife	Gustaf Molander	
1929	The Inseparables	Velda	John Stafford	
1930	The Parisian	Yvonne	Jean de Limur	
1930	Knowing Men	Korah Harley	Elinor Glyn	
1930	The Price of Things	Anthea Dane	Elinor Glyn	
1930	Children of Chance	Binnie/Lia Monta	Alexander Esway	
1931	Body and Soul	Carla	Alfred Santell	
1931	Always Goodbye	Lila Banning	William Cameron Menzies	
1931	Wicked	Margot Rande	Allan Dwan	
1931	The Yellow Ticket	Marya Kalish	Raoul Walsh	
1932	Devil's Lottery	Evelyn Beresford	Sam Taylor	
1932	The Woman in Room 13	Laura Ramsey	Henry King	
1932	A Passport to Hell	Myra Carson	Frank Lloyd	
1932	The Sign of the Cross	Mercia	Cecil B. DeMille	
1933	The Warrior's Husband	Antiope	Walter Lang	
1933	I Loved You Wednesday	Vicki Meredith	William Cameron Menzies	
1933	The Masquerader	Eve Chilcote	Richard Wallace	
1933	By Candlelight	Marie	James Whale	
1934	Man of Two Worlds	Joan Pemberton	J. Walter Ruben	
1934	The Great Flirtation	Zita Marishka	Ralph Murphy	
1934	Sisters Under the Skin	Judy O'Grady aka Blossom Bailey	David Burton	
1934	The Count of Monte Cristo	Mercedes de Rosas	Rowland V. Lee	
1935	Königsmark	Princess Aurore	Maurice Tourneur	
1935	Enter Madame	Lisa Della Robbia	Elliott Nugent	
1935	Without Regret	Jennifer Gage	Harold Young	
1936	The Amateur Gentleman	Lady Cleone Meredith	Thornton Freeland	
1936	Mad Holiday	Peter Dean	George B. Seitz	
1936	After the Thin Man	Selma Landis	W. S. Van Dyke	
1937	The Thirteenth Chair	Helen Trent	George B. Seitz	
1943	Corregidor	Dr. Royce Lee	William Nigh	

== Radio appearances ==
Year	Program	Episode/source
1943	Suspense	"Nothing Up My Sleeve"
