= Colonel Newcome (play) =

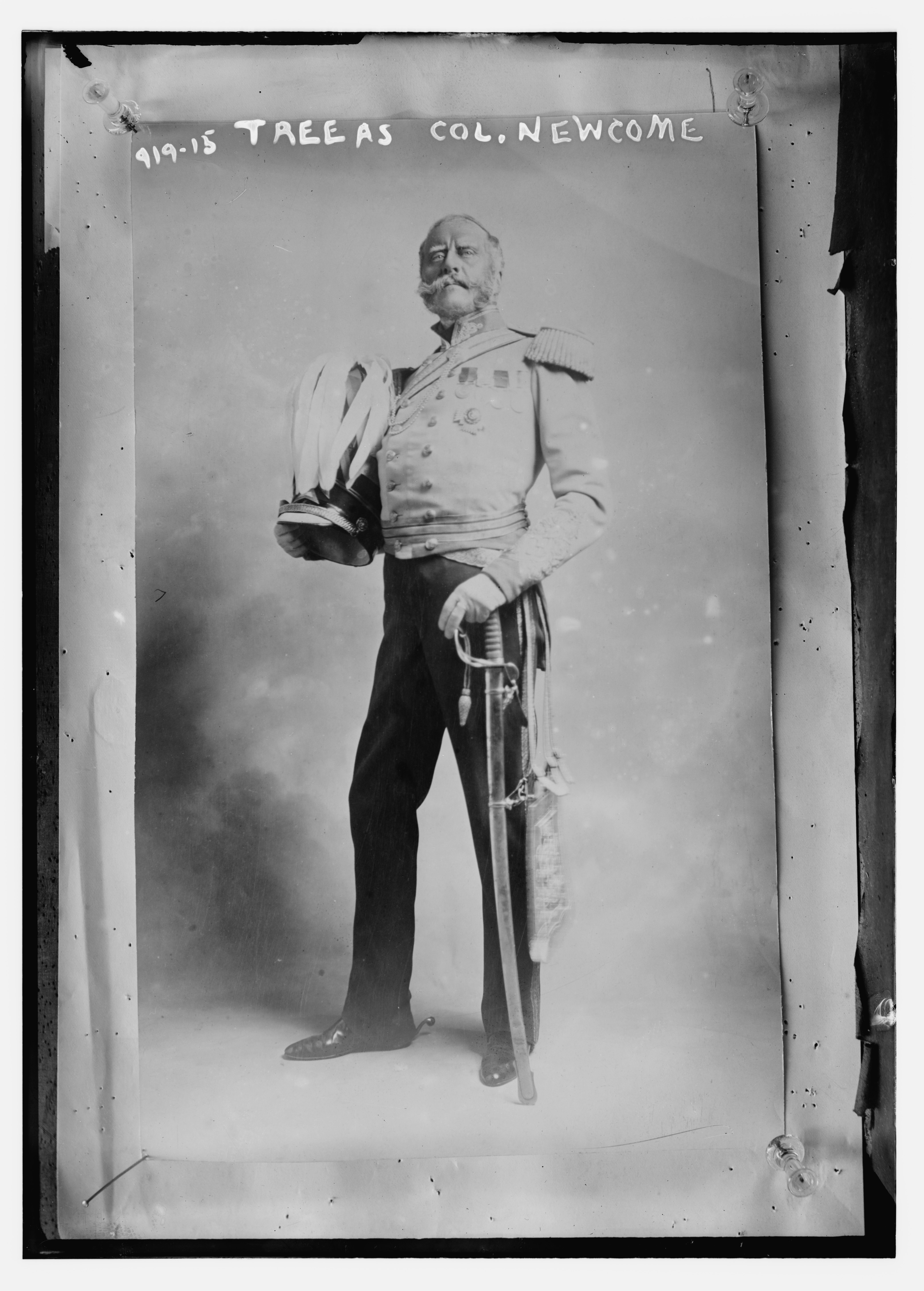
Herbert Beerbohm Tree in Colonel Newcome (1917)

Colonel Newcome is a 1906 play by the British writer Michael Morton. It is based on the character from the 1855 William Makepeace Thackeray novel The Newcomes. The part was written for the actor Herbert Beerbohm Tree.

== Bibliography ==
- Matthews, Brander. Playwrights on playmaking, and other studies of the stage. 1923.
