= The Yellow Ticket (1918 American film) =

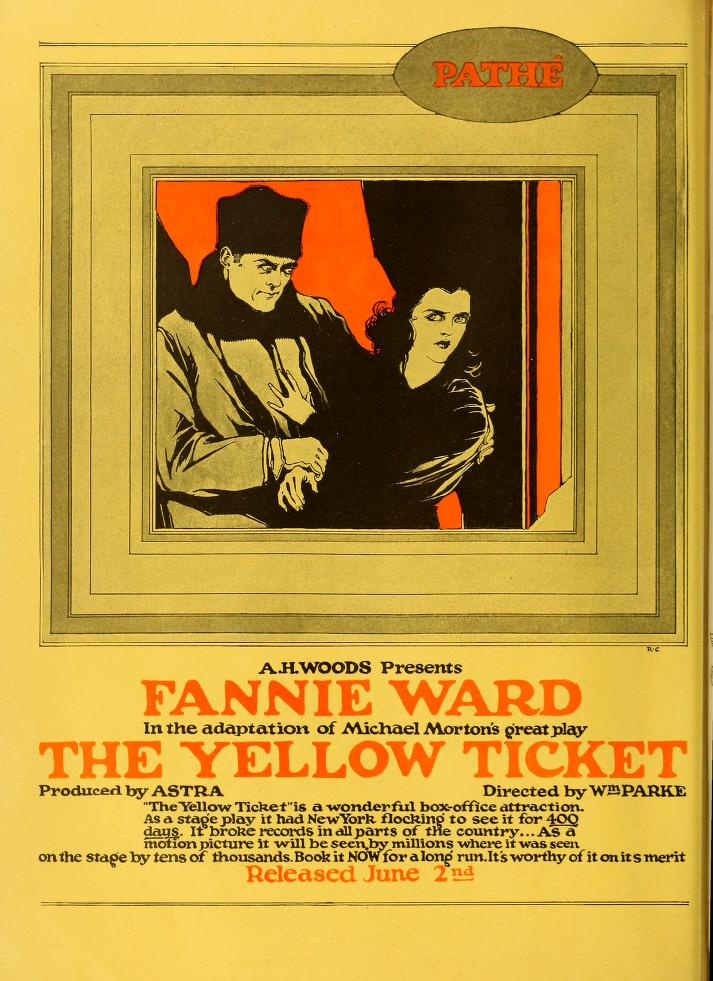
- Advertisement in The Moving Picture World, 1918
- Directed by: William Parke
- Written by: Tom Cushing
- Based on: The Yellow Ticket by Michael Morton
- Produced by: Astra Film Co.
- Starring: Fannie Ward; Milton Sills; Warner Oland
- Distributed by: Pathé Exchange
- Release date: May 26, 1918
- Running time: 5 reels
- Country: United States
- Language: Silent (English intertitles)

The Yellow Ticket is a 1918 American silent drama film directed by William Parke and starring Fannie Ward. It is based on Michael Morton's 1914 play The Yellow Ticket. This screen adaptation of the play is currently classified as a lost film.

== Plot ==
Anna Mirrel, a young Jewish girl in Czarist Russia, is forced to pretend to be a prostitute to obtain a passport (a "yellow ticket") in order to visit her father, whom she believes to be ill. When she arrives in St. Petersburg, she learns that her father has been killed. She encounters a young journalist and tells him about injustices the government has kept him from learning about.

== Cast ==
- Fannie Ward as Anna Mirrel
- Milton Sills as Julian rolfe
- Warner Oland as Baron Andrey
- Armand Kaliz as Count rostov
- J. H. Gilmour as U. S. Consul Seaton
- Helene Chadwick as Miss Seaton
- Leon Bary as Petrov Paviak
- Anna Lehr as Mary Varenka
- Dan Mason as Isaac Mirrel

Uncredited cast

- Nicholas Dunaew
- Edward Elkas
- Charles Jackson (*as Charley Jackson)
- Richard Thornton

== Production ==
The film is an adaptation of a play by Michael Morton. Raoul Walsh would direct another film version in 1931.

The film was produced by Astra Films and distributed by Pathé Exchange.
