= Eaco Films =

American film studio founded in New York City

Eaco Films was an American film studio founded in New York City in 1914 by M. C. Goldman, Edward E. Anderson (brother of G. M. Anderson), and Edwin August. Benjamin Zeidman was the advertising and publicity manager. The company was named from the initials of Edward Anderson/Edwin August (E. A. Co.). Eaco went bankrupt after a few months.
