= Edwin August =

American actor (1883–1964)

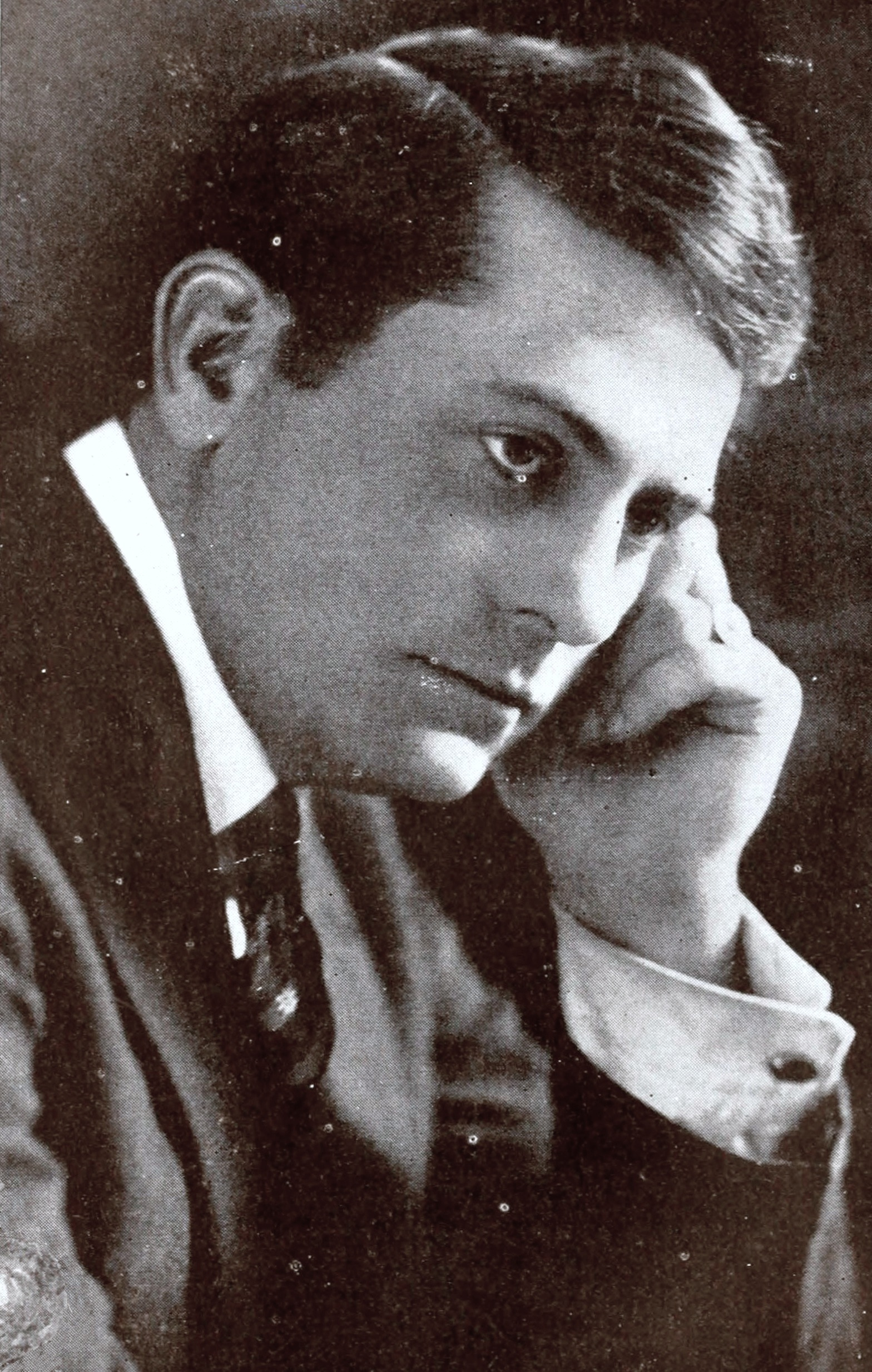
- August in 1914
- Born: Edwin August Phillip von der Butz; November 10, 1883; St. Louis, Missouri, U.S.
- Died: March 4, 1964 (aged 80); Hollywood, California, U.S.
- Occupations: Actor; film director; screenwriter
- Years active: 1909–1947

Edwin August Phillip von der Butz (November 10, 1883 – March 4, 1964) was an American actor, director, and screenwriter of the silent era.

August was born in St. Louis, Missouri, and graduated from Christian Brothers College there. He acted in stock theater as leading man at the Imperial Theater in St. Louis. He went on to act on stage in New York. He appeared on Broadway in Mr. and Mrs. Daventry (1910).

He appeared in more than 150 films between 1909 and 1947. He also directed 52 films between 1912 and 1919. He co-founded Eaco Films in 1914. He wrote novels under the pen name Montague Lawrence.

August died in Hollywood, California. His grave is located at Valhalla Memorial Park Cemetery in North Hollywood.

== Partial filmography ==
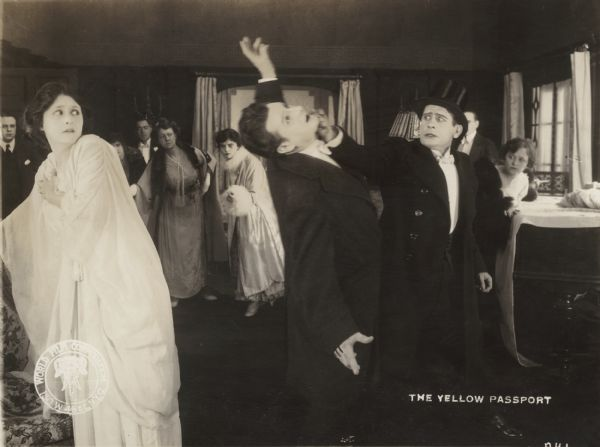
Clara Kimball Young reacts as August (right) punches John St. Polis in a still from The Yellow Passport (1916).

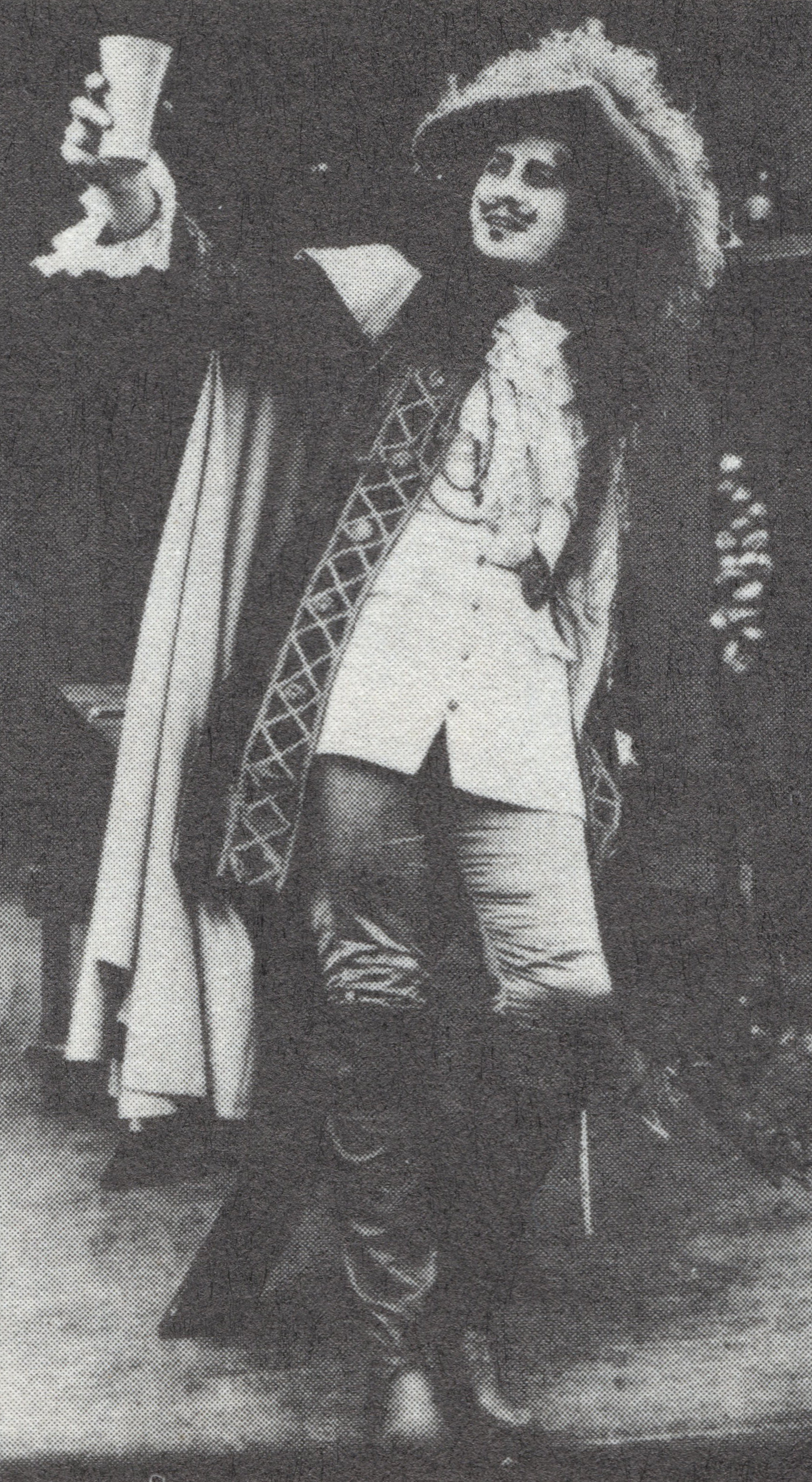
August in the Biograph film The Smile of a Child (1911)

- The Welcome Burglar (1909, Short)
- The House with Closed Shutters (1910, Short)
- The Stars and Stripes (1910) - John Paul Jones, captain of the Bonhomme Richard
- The Fugitive (1910, Short) - John - the Union Son
- His Daughter (1911, Short) - William Whittier
- The Smile of a Child (1911, Short)
- A Country Cupid (1911, Short) - Jack - Edith's Sweetheart
- Out from the Shadow (1911, Short) - Mr. Vane
- Her Awakening (1911, Short)
- The Stuff Heroes Are Made Of (1911, Short) - The Young Author
- The Making of a Man (1911, Short) - Young Woman's Family
- The Long Road (1911, Short)* - At Party
- Through Darkened Vales (1911, Short)
- The Voice of the Child (1911, Short) - The Husband
- The Eternal Mother (1912, Short) - John - the Husband
- The Old Bookkeeper (1912, Short) - The Old Bookkeeper's Employer
- Under Burning Skies (1912, Short) - On Street
- One Is Business, the Other Crime (1912, Short) - The Rich Husband
- The Lesser Evil (1912, Short) - The Young Woman's Sweetheart
- A Beast at Bay (1912, Short) - The Young Woman's Ideal
- The School Teacher and the Waif (1912, Short) - The School Teacher
- The Sands of Dee (1912, Short) - The Artist
- Twixt Love and Ambition (1912, Short) - John Sterne
- The Detective's Stratagem (1913, Short) - The Bank President
- The Lions Pit (1914, Short) - Marius
- Brute Force (1914, Short)
- The Hoosier Schoolmaster (1914)
- Pitfalls (1914)
- When It Strikes Home (1915) - Richard Hartley
- Evidence (1915) - Curley Lushington
- The Yellow Passport (1916) - Adolph Rosenheimer
- The Social Highwayman (1916) - John Jaffray / Curtis Jaffray
- A Tale of Two Nations (1917)
- The Lion's Claws (1918) - Roger Hammond
- A Broadway Scandal (1918) - David Kendall
- The Mortgaged Wife (1918) - Darrell Courtney
- The City of Tears (1918) - Tony Bonchi
- The Idol of the North (1921) - Martin Bates
- The Blonde Vampire (1922) - Martin Kent
- Scandal Street (1925) - Howard Manning
- Dreary House (1928)
- Side Street (1929) - Henchman Mac (uncredited)
- Romance of the West (1930) - Chuck Anderson
- Orchids to You (1935) - Flower Shop Employee (uncredited)
- Come and Get It (1936) - Restaurant Patron (uncredited)
- Marked Woman (1937) - Juror (uncredited)
- Safety in Numbers (1938) - Customer
- The Rage of Paris (1938) - Receptionist (uncredited)
- Youth Takes a Fling (1938) - Railroad Conductor (uncredited)
- Mr. Smith Goes to Washington (1939) - Senator (uncredited)
- The Magnificent Ambersons (1942) - Citizen (uncredited)
- The Pride of the Yankees (1942) - Restaurant Patron (uncredited)
- Gentleman Jim (1942) - Olympic Club Member (uncredited)
- Over My Dead Body (1942) - Bailiff
- Mr. Lucky (1943) - Blood Bank Donor (uncredited)
- Song of the Thin Man (1947) - Casino Patron (uncredited)
- The Exile (1947) - Burger (uncredited)

=== As director ===
- The Sea Urchin (1913)
- The Blood Red Tape of Charity (1913)
- The Trap (1913)
- Evidence (1915)
- The Yellow Passport (1916)
