= The Yellow Ticket (1918 German film) =

1918 film

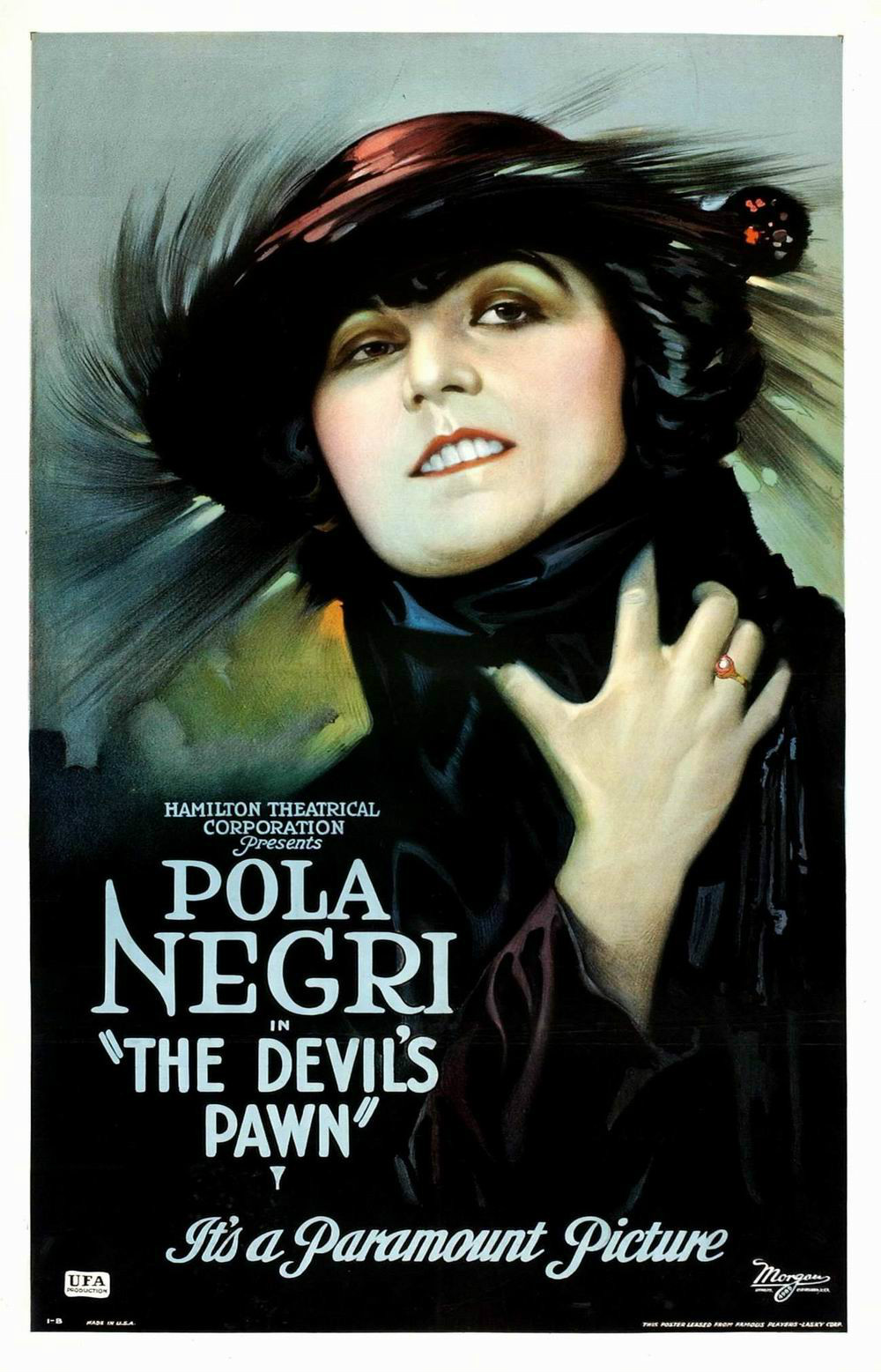
- Theatrical release poster for the 1922 US release, titled The Devil's Pawn
- Directed by: Victor Janson; Eugen Illés
- Written by: Hans Brennert; Hans Kräly
- Produced by: Paul Davidson
- Starring: Pola Negri
- Cinematography: Eugen Illés
- Production company: PAGU
- Distributed by: UFA; Paramount Pictures
- Release date: 22 November 1918
- Running time: 58 minutes
- Country: Germany
- Language: Silent film

The Yellow Ticket (German: Der Gelbe Schein), also known as The Devil's Pawn, is a 1918 German silent film starring Pola Negri in a double role as Lea and her mother Lydia, Victor Janson as Ossip Storki, and Harry Liedtke as Dimitri. It was directed by Victor Janson and Eugen Illés.

== Plot ==
Pola Negri plays Lea, a bright adolescent girl who lives in the Jewish ghetto of Warsaw with her ill father. She loves to read, and intends to study medicine at a university in St. Petersburg in the hopes of making her father well again. Her father dies suddenly and her tutor, Ossip Storki, is called away to work for the governor. When she goes to Russia, she learns that Jewish women are only allowed to work as sex workers with the benefit of a "yellow passport", otherwise they will be taken to prison. She applies for a yellow passport and takes up residency at a brothel. Upon finding the identification papers of her tutor's deceased sister Sophie in a book her tutor gave her, Lea applies to the University with the deceased sister's identification papers and is accepted. So begins an unhappy life of studying by day and receiving scholastic honors, while reluctantly working as a party girl at night. Her fellow students, including a boy named Dimitri who is in love with her, then find her out. Dimitri in particular is crushed to learn of Lea's double life. Lea realizes that this will be the end of her scholastic career, and attempts suicide.

Dimitri goes to their professor, Peter Zukowski, to tell him of Lea's double life. Prof. Zukowski then ruminates over his own double life, having fathered an illegitimate child 19 years prior with a fellow student named Lydia. He does not know what became of either Lydia or the child. Meanwhile, Lea's former tutor Storki learns that his deceased sister has allegedly received a gold medal for her studies at the University in St. Petersburg. Storki is suspicious and asks for a leave of absence from his work to investigate the matter. A meeting between Stroki and Prof. Zukowski reveals that Lea is actually the professor's long lost daughter. The next day, Lea is brought to the University for an emergency operation. The professor learns on the spot this it is Lea, his daughter, that he has to save from death. The surgery is successful, and Lea recovers, with both her father and her admirer Dimitri at her side.

== Production ==
It was made at the Tempelhof Studios in Berlin. According to the restored version of the film's intertitles, "The Yellow Ticket takes place in Warsaw in 1918, during the First World War before the German army had left. In the film, Warsaw was used to portray the city of St. Petersburg. Many scenes were filmed in the Jewish 'ghetto' of Warsaw." It was a full-length remake of Czarna Ksiazeczka, a 1915 Polish film directed by Aleksander Hertz that also starred Negri.

== Release ==
German release poster

Der Gelbe Schein was released in Germany on November 22, 1918. It was released in the US by Paramount Pictures in 1922 under the title The Devil's Pawn.

During World War II, the National Socialist regime in Germany allegedly attempted to destroy all existing copies of the film, but it managed to survive. The film was restored by Kevin Brownlow and is held by The Israeli Film Archive and The Nederlands Filmmuseum.

Der Gelbe Schein was digitally restored and released on DVD as The Yellow Ticket in 2011 by Bright Shining City Productions as part of the 3-DVD set Pola Negri: Iconic Collection-Early Films.

In 2013, the klezmer violinist Alicia Svigals composed a new score for the film for violin and piano. With the jazz pianist Marilyn Lerner, she toured the United States accompanying the Brownlow version of the film (with newly translated intertitles by Svigals). Svigals' score was commissioned by the New Jewish Culture Network of the Foundation for Jewish Culture.

== Reception ==
Polanegri.com claims The Yellow Ticket is "an enjoyable movie with a great dramatic storyline that involves heartbreak, melodrama with surprise connections amongst the main players, and a positive message about embracing humanity over race."

The Foundation for Jewish Culture calls the film "Remarkably progressive for its time."
