= Mr. and Mrs. Jones =

Mr. and Mrs. Jones is a series of popular short comedy films produced in 1908-1909 by American Biograph starring John R. Cumpson and Florence Lawrence in the title roles, Eddie and Emma Jones, which helped to turn the latter into one of the first movie stars. The series arose out of Biograph's attempts to come up with a more polite, less vulgar form of slapstick comedy. Having been known as "The Biograph Girl," the "Mrs. Jones" name quickly became attached to Lawrence, as actors at the time were almost never credited. The series ended when Lawrence was fired from Biograph over a pay dispute. She was quickly hired by Carl Laemmle's Independent Moving Picture Company (IMP). Selig Polyscope Company released the unrelated Mrs. Jones' Birthday on 30 August 1909.

The films were directed by D. W. Griffith, who co-wrote the early episodes with Frank E. Woods and wrote the later episodes. Mack Sennett appeared in various roles, including the Jones's butler, in several of the shorts.

== Films in the Series ==
- 1. Mr. Jones at the Ball (25 December 1908)
- 2. Mrs. Jones Entertains (9 January 1909)
- 3. Mr. Jones Has a Card Party (21 January 1909)
- 4. The Joneses Have Amateur Theatricals (18 February 1909)
- 5. His Wife's Mother (1 March 1909)
- 6. Jones and His New Neighbors (29 March 1909)
- 7. Jones and the Lady Book Agent (10 May 1909)
- 8. Her First Biscuits (17 June 1909)
- 9. The Peachbasket Hat (24 June 1909)
- 10. Mr. Jones' Burglar (8 August 1909)
- 11. Mrs. Jones' Lover; or, 'I Want My Hat' (19 August 1909)
