= Jones and the Lady Book Agent =

1909 comedy film by D. W. Griffith

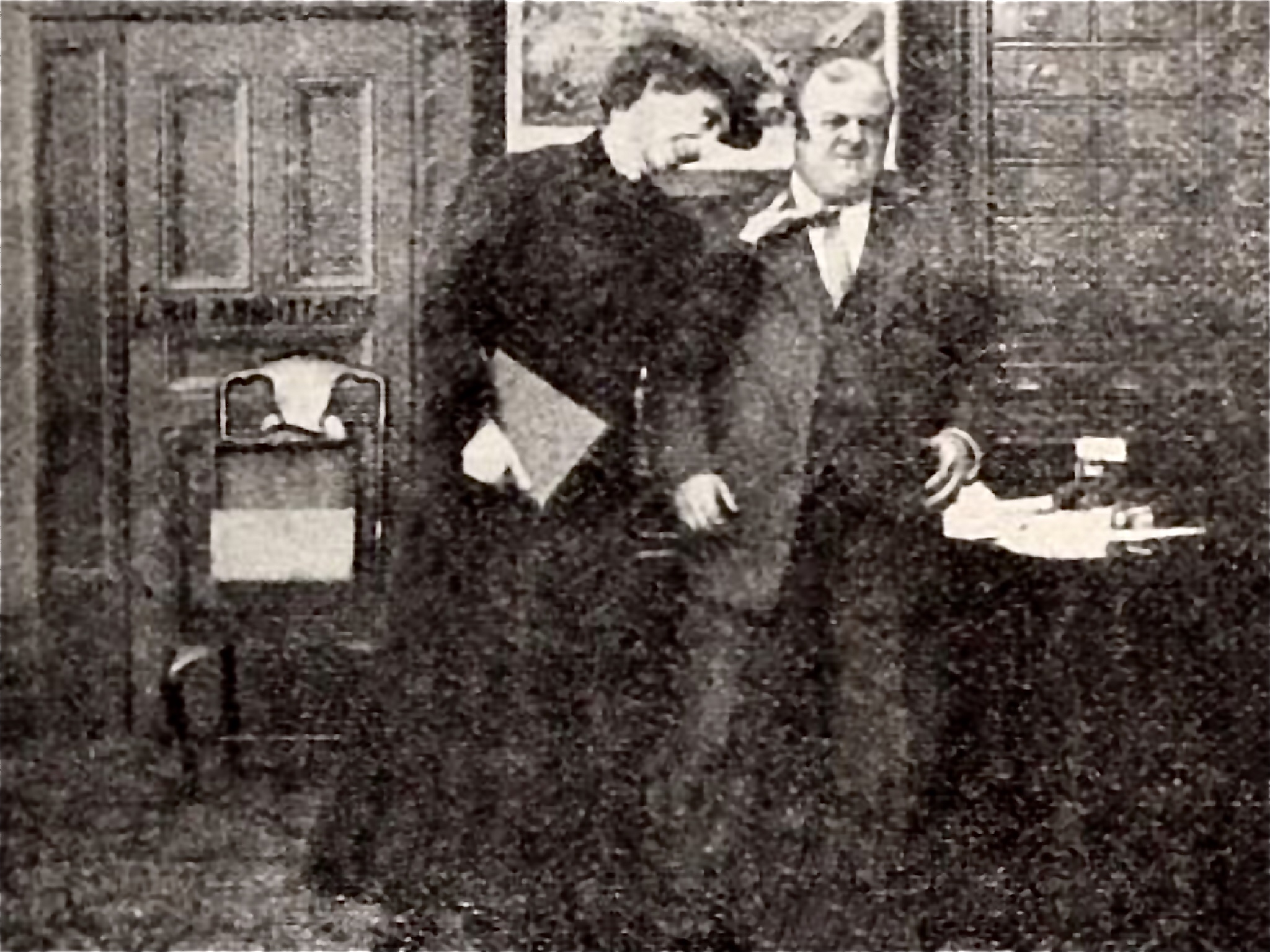
- Film still with the book agent (Flora Finch) and Mr. Jones (John Cumpson)
- Directed by: D. W. Griffith
- Written by: Frank E. Woods
- Produced by: American Mutoscope and Biograph Company, Manhattan, New York
- Starring: John R. Cumpson; Florence Lawrence; Flora Finch
- Cinematography: G. W. Bitzer
- Release date: May 10, 1909
- Running time: 8-9 minutes, 585 feet at release (part of split reel) (Note: According to the reference How Movies Work by Bruce F. Kawin (New York: Macmillan Publishing Company, 1987, pp. 46-47), a full 1000-foot reel of film in the silent era had, on average, a maximum running time of 15 minutes. Also, silent films were generally projected at a "standard" speed of 16 frames per second, much slower than the 24 frames of later sound films.)
- Country: United States
- Languages: Silent; English intertitles

Jones and the Lady Book Agent is a 1909 American silent comedy film written by Frank E. Woods and directed by D. W. Griffith. Produced by the American Mutoscope and Biograph Company in New York City, the short stars John R. Cumpson, Florence Lawrence, and Flora Finch as the "lady book agent". It is one film in a series of 1908 and 1909 Biograph pictures in which Cumpson and Lawrence performed together as the married couple Mr. and Mrs. Jones. When this comedy was released in May 1909, it was distributed to theaters on a "split reel", which was a single projection reel that accommodated more than one motion picture. It shared its reel with another Biograph comedy short directed by Griffith, The French Duel. The film was released on May 10, 1909 by Biograph Company and was met by positive viewers. The film is presumed lost.

Original contact-print paper rolls of both motion pictures, as well as projectable safety-stock footage of the productions, are preserved in the Library of Congress.

== Plot ==
The comedy opens in the office of Mr. Edward Jones, who is being pestered by a female literary agent to buy a book from her. After leaving his office, the agent overhears Jones making insulting remarks about her. The agent, now seeking revenge, plants incriminating but false evidence of a romantic relationship between them, items that Edward's wife Emma will later see at their home. Emma is enraged when she sees the fabricated evidence, and she literally "beats up her husband". She then locks herself in their bedroom and begins packing her suitcase to go to her mother's home. In the end, however, all is forgiven after an apologetic letter from the agent arrives in which she confesses her scheme against the hapless Mr. Jones.

Further details about the film's storyline are given in a May 10, 1909 bulletin published by Biograph:

There is no question that the good-natured man is always made the "Patsy" and so it is that poor Jones, who is benignity personified, is always getting into hot water. His latest episode is an experience with a female book agent, who tried to sell him a book entitled "How to be happy, tho' wedded." The work does not appeal to affable Edward, and he with gentlemanly firmness rejects her from his office, as his friend Dick Smith enters, to whom he mimics the ludicrous antics of his visitor. All this is witnessed by this modern Clio, who is peeking through the keyhole. She vows to be revenged, and seeing a box of gloves which Jones has bought for his wife, she substitutes her corsets for the gloves, writes a note which she puts in his overcoat pocket, asking him to return her corsets, and finally sends a letter to Mrs. Jones, warning her of her husband's perfidy and to search his pockets for proof. Does the scheme work? Well, there seems to be a certainty a case of "Jones vs. Jones" appearing on the calendar of the Divorce Court, in the near future, but the book agent becomes conscience stricken and sends a letter of contrition to Mr. and Mrs. Jones explaining everything. Peace again reigns and Jones receives the osculatory balm for his throbbing forehead.

== Cast ==
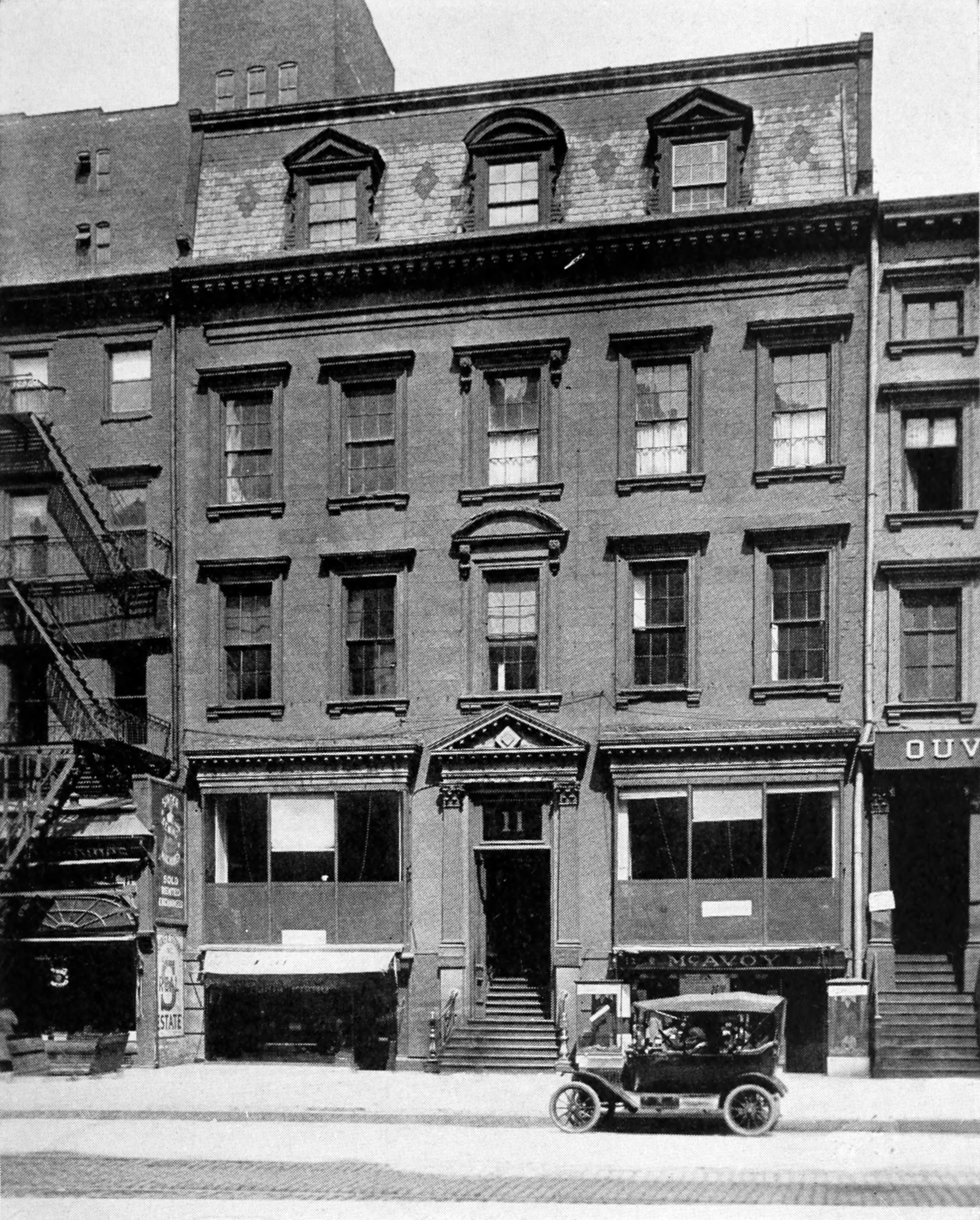
Biograph's Manhattan studio, where the comedy was filmed in three days in January 1909

- John R. Cumpson as Mr. Jones
- Florence Lawrence as Mrs. Jones
- Flora Finch as lady book agent
- Mack Sennett as Dick Smith
- Gertrude Robinson as maid
- Owen Moore in office
- Harry Solter in office
- George Gebhardt in office
- Robert Harron as messenger

== Production ==
The screenplay, written by Frank E. Woods, was produced at Biograph's main studio, which in 1909 was located inside a large renovated brownstone mansion in New York City, in Manhattan, at 11 East 14th Street. Filmed over three days—on January 12, 14, and 25, 1909—director Griffith and cinematographer G. W. "Billy" Bitzer shot on interior sets at the studio.

=== The short's "anonymous" actors ===
Identifying cast members in early Biograph releases such as Jones and the Lady Book Agent is made more difficult by the fact that the studio, as a matter of company policy, did not begin publicly crediting its performers on screen, in trade publications, or in newspaper advertisements until years after this comedy's release. The names of the cast members in this short were generally unknown to theater audiences in 1909, as were the names of the rest of Biograph's relatively small staff of "photoplayers" and crew, including Griffith himself. At the time of this comedy's release, Florence Lawrence was already gaining widespread celebrity among filmgoers. Few people, though, outside the motion picture industry knew her name, so in 1909 and for the remainder of her time working at Biograph, the actress was referred to by admirers and in news articles in the media simply as "'the Biograph girl'". The studio would not begin to credit or publicize its performers by name until 1913.

=== Part of the "Jonesy" series ===
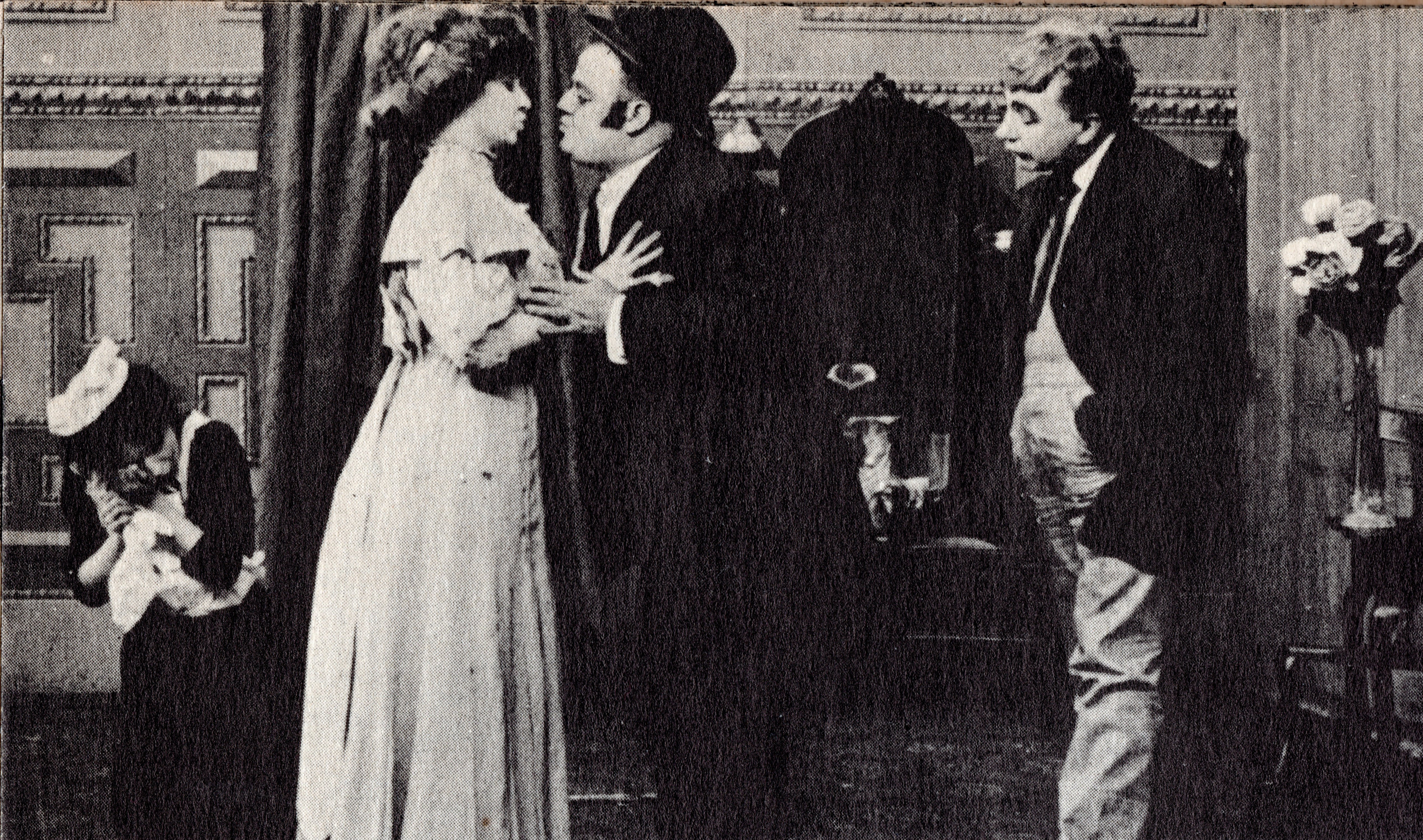
Lawrence and Cumpson (center) kiss in one of the earlier "Jones shorts", Mrs. Jones Entertains (1909)

Jones and the Lady Book Agent is the ninth film in a series of thirteen very popular Biograph comedy shorts that were written by Frank E. Woods in 1908 and 1909. Twelve of those films were directed by Griffith and starred the duo of Cumpson and Lawrence as a married couple. Initially, the couple's surname was "Bibbs", but after their first screen performance together, the two actors played as Eddie and Emma Jones for the rest of the series. (Note: The 1908 short His Day of Rest, released on May 29 that year, is considered by some film historians to be Biograph's first "Jones" film because its screenplay was also written by Frank E. Woods and contained situations and characterizations that are identical to those found in the later Jones comedies. That film, however, was not directed by Griffith but by Wallace McCutcheon, and it starred Edward Dillon as a "Mr. Bibbs", not as the character of Mr. Jones. Although Cumpson and Lawrence were also identified as Mr. and Mrs. Benjamin Bibbs in their first short together as a married couple, A Smoked Husband (1908), in all of the remaining installments in the series, the actors performed only as Mr. and Mrs. Jones.)

Released between September 1908 and September 1909, all of the "Jonesy" films from that period feature Cumpson as the portly and frequently "bewildered" Mr. Jones and Florence Lawrence as his pretty, much younger spouse. The other shorts in the series with Cumpson and Lawrence are A Smoked Husband (1908), Mr. Jones at the Ball (1908), Mrs. Jones Entertains (1909), Mr. Jones Has a Card Party (1909), The Joneses Have Amateur Theatricals (1909), His Wife's Mother (1909), Jones and His New Neighbors (1909), Her First Biscuits (1909), The Peachbasket Hat (1909), Jones' Burglar (1909), and Mrs. Jones' Lover (1908) (Note: The 1909 short Mrs. Jones' Lover is also cited in some contemporary publications and in later film indexes by another title, I Want My Hat.) The general structure and comedic style of Jones and the Lady Book Agent replicated those found in all the releases in the series, common traits described by biographer Kelly R. Brown in her 1999 book Florence Lawrence, The Biograph Girl: America's First Movie Star. "The stories", writes Brown, "were pure slapstick comedy, straight from vaudeville, where usually a misunderstanding escalated into the kind of comic violence which audiences loved."

== Release and reception ==
Although filmed in January 1909, the comedy was not released until nearly four months later, on May 10, an exceedingly long time after the completion of filming in the early silent era, when shorts were edited, having theatrical prints made, were promoted in the "trades", and released with remarkable speed. Usually those tasks required only a matter of a few weeks and, at times, even less time. For example, Jones and His New Neighbors, the release in the "Jones series" that preceded this picture, completed its filming at Biograph on February 25, 1909 and was released less than five weeks later, on March 29. While some delays were due to scheduling considerations with other productions and the appropriate pairing of split reels, an interval of four months between final filming and release was very unusual in 1909, especially for such brief screen subjects. The release of this Jones short was no doubt delayed in part due to its pairing with The French Duel. That comedy took only two days to shoot, but those filming days were widely spaced apart. Biograph production records show that the first day of filming took place on February 23; the second, not until 16 days later, on March 11. Inclement weather might have played a role in that delay, for after filming interior scenes of The French Duel at Biograph's Manhattan studio, Griffith shot needed outdoor footage on location in Coytesville, situated in the borough of Fort Lee, New Jersey.

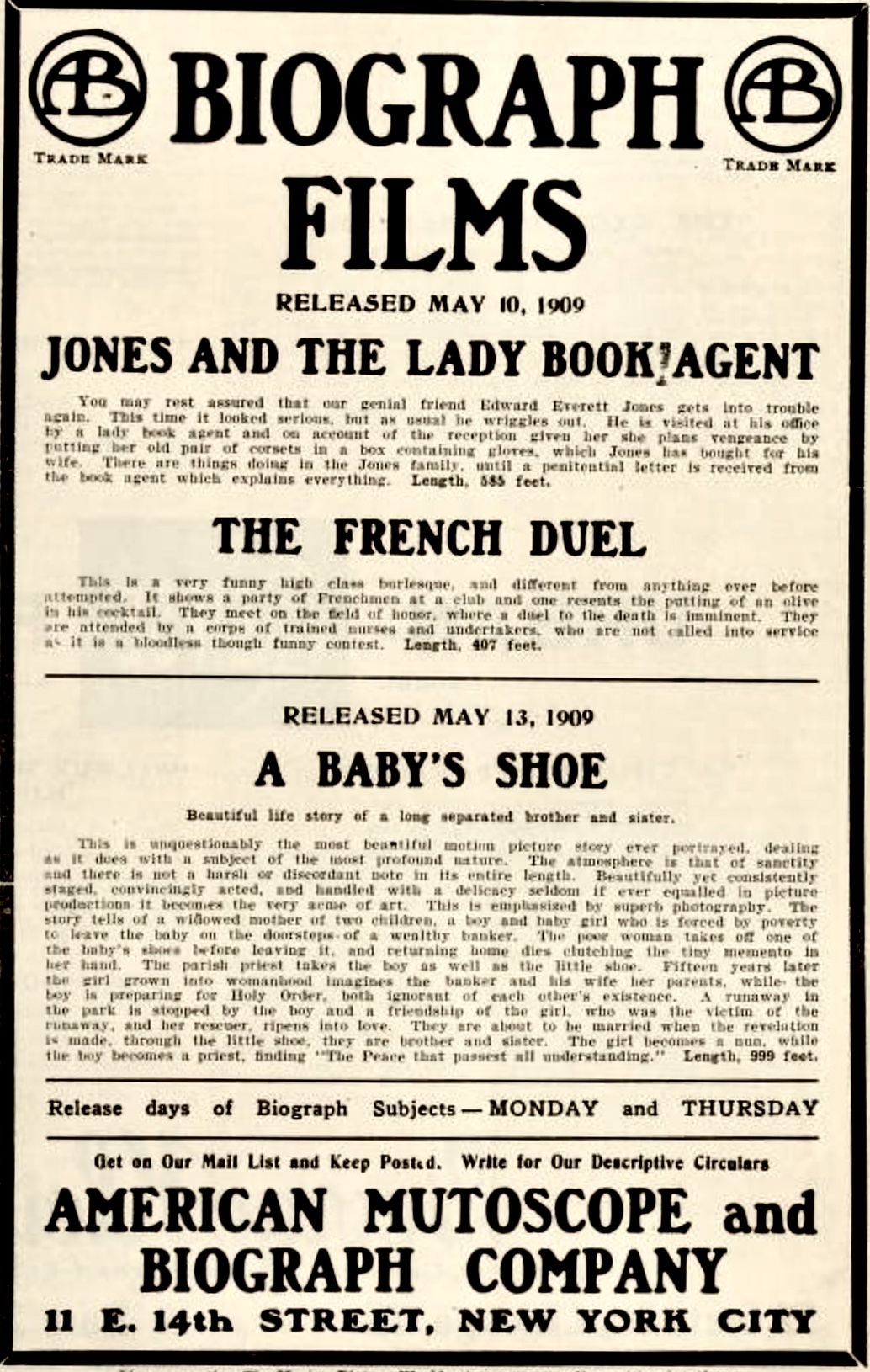
Studio promotion in 1909 for the film and its split-reel companion The French Duel

After their release, the split-reel films circulated to theaters throughout the United States and continued to be promoted for weeks in film-industry publications and for months by newspapers in both large and small communities. The two Biograph shorts were often paired by theater managers with other split-reel releases distributed by Edison Studios in the same period. For example, in June 1909 in Barre, Vermont, the local theater advertised a joint presentation of Jones and the Lady Book Agent and The French Duel with the two Edison comedies Uncle Tom Wins and The Unsuccessful Superstition as well as with a full vaudeville show of skits and "Scotch" singers. This ninth comedy of the "Jones series", like its predecessors, was popular with audiences, with "very funny" and "clever" being common descriptions of the shorts in contemporary newspaper and theater advertisements.

== Preservation status ==
Photographic prints and a film negative and positive of Jones and the Lady Book Agent survive in the Library of Congress (LOC), which holds a 205-foot paper roll of contact prints produced directly frame-by-frame from the comedy's original 35mm master negative. (Note: The print of Jones and the Lady Book Agent preserved in the Library of Congress is numbered "FLA5504"; the negative copy, "FRA2378".) Submitted by Biograph to the United States government in 1909, shortly before the film's release, the roll is part of the original documentation required by federal authorities for motion picture companies to obtain copyright protection for their productions. While the library's paper roll of the film is certainly not projectable, a negative copy of the roll's paper images was made and transferred onto modern polyester-based safety film stock to produce a positive print for screening. Those copies were made as part of a preservation project carried out during the 1950s and early 1960s by Kemp R. Niver and other LOC staff, who restored more than 3,000 early paper rolls of film images from the library's collection and created safety-stock copies.

== See also ==
- D. W. Griffith filmography
