= Jones and His New Neighbors =

1909 film directed by D. W. Griffith

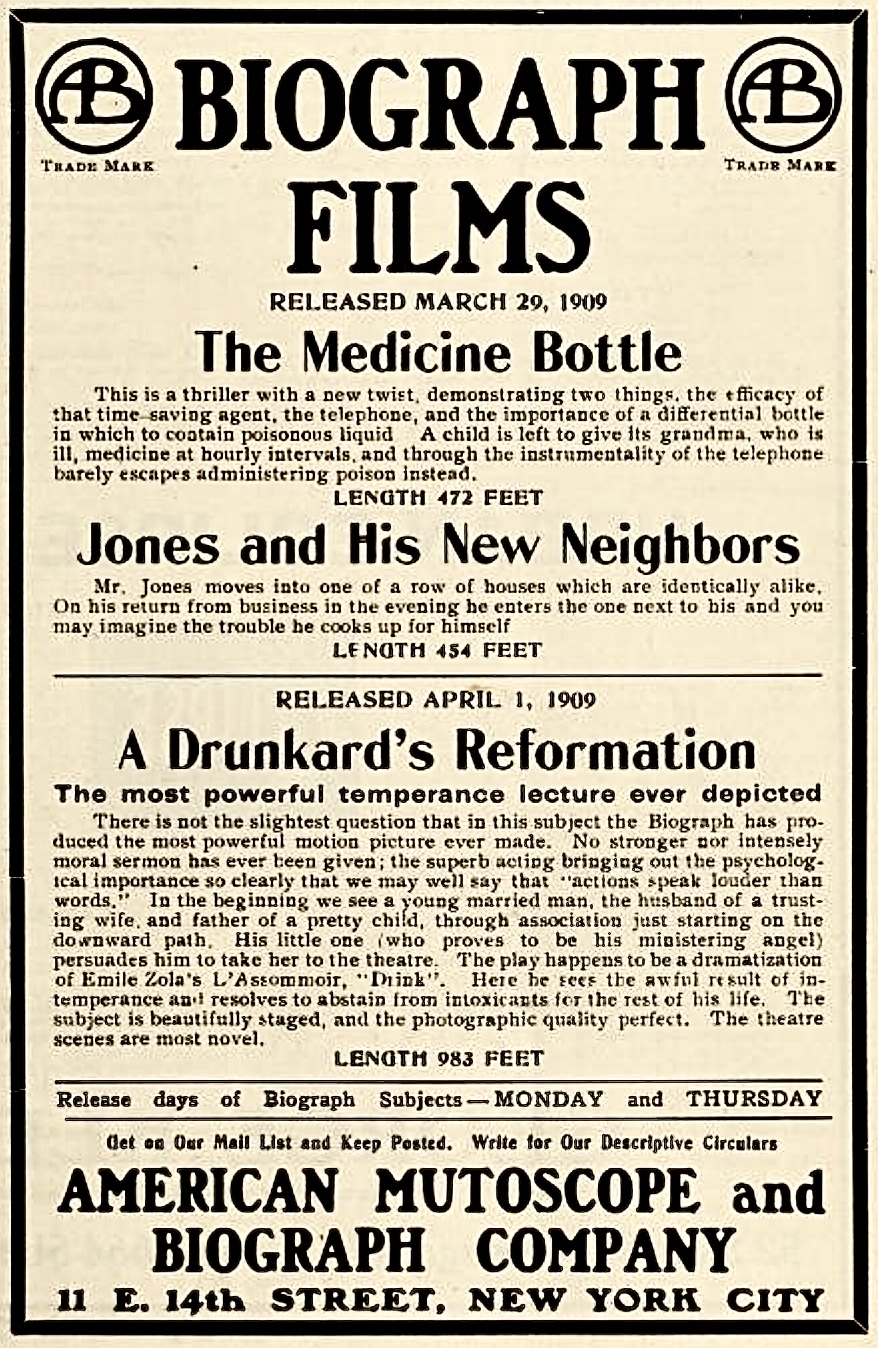
- Biograph promotion for the film and its split-reel companion The Medicine Bottle
- Directed by: D. W. Griffith
- Written by: Frank E. Woods
- Produced by: American Mutoscope and Biograph Company, Manhattan, New York
- Starring: John R. Cumpson; Florence Lawrence; Anita Hendrie
- Cinematography: G. W. Bitzer
- Release date: March 29, 1909
- Running time: 7 minutes, 454 feet (part of split reel) (Note: According to the reference How Movies Work by Bruce F. Kawin (New York: Macmillan Publishing Company, 1987, pp. 46-47), a full 1000-foot reel of film in the silent era had, on average, a maximum running time of 15 minutes. Also, silent films were generally projected at a "standard" speed of 16 frames per second, much slower than the 24 frames of later sound films.)
- Country: United States
- Languages: Silent; English intertitles

Jones and His New Neighbors is a 1909 American silent comedy film written by Frank E. Woods and directed by D. W. Griffith. Produced by the American Mutoscope and Biograph Company in New York City, the short stars John R. Cumpson, Florence Lawrence, and Anita Hendrie. It is one film in a series of 1908 and 1909 Biograph pictures in which Cumpson and Lawrence performed together as the married couple Mr. and Mrs. Jones. When this comedy was released in March 1909, it was distributed to theaters on a "split reel", which was a single projection reel that accommodated more than one motion picture. It shared its reel with another Biograph short directed by Griffith, the dramatic "thriller" The Medicine Bottle.

Original contact-print paper rolls of both motion pictures, as well as projectable safety-stock copies of them, are preserved in the Library of Congress.

== Plot ==
The following summary of the comedy is published in the April 3, 1909 issue of the New York trade publication The Film Index:

The Joneses have moved and taken an apartment in one of a row of houses which are identically alike. The most natural thing happens; Jones gets into the wrong house, and, of course, his intrusion is vigorously resented, and it looked for a time he would suffer bodily injury, but as usual the menacing clouds dissipate and peace again reigns in the Jones domicile. Eddie may get some hard bumps, but they never scar.

Additional details about the film's storyline are provided in another much later summary published in Kemp P. Niver's extensive 1985 reference Early Motion Pictures: The Paper Print Collection in the Library of Congress:

All of the incidents in this humorous one-reel picture are related to the preoccupation of neighbors who live on a street where the front doors are all identical. A husband comes home, his wife embraces him and leaves the room. When she returns she finds a strange man reading the newspaper and generally making himself at home. She is disturbed. The unwelcome intruder flees in terror, accidentally taking his host's hat and overcoat. The film shows three such incidents. The final scenes show all the neighbors, brandishing kitchenware and pounding on the door of the man who caused all the trouble by wandering into the wrong apartment. A policeman arrives and straightens everything out, ending the film.

== Cast ==
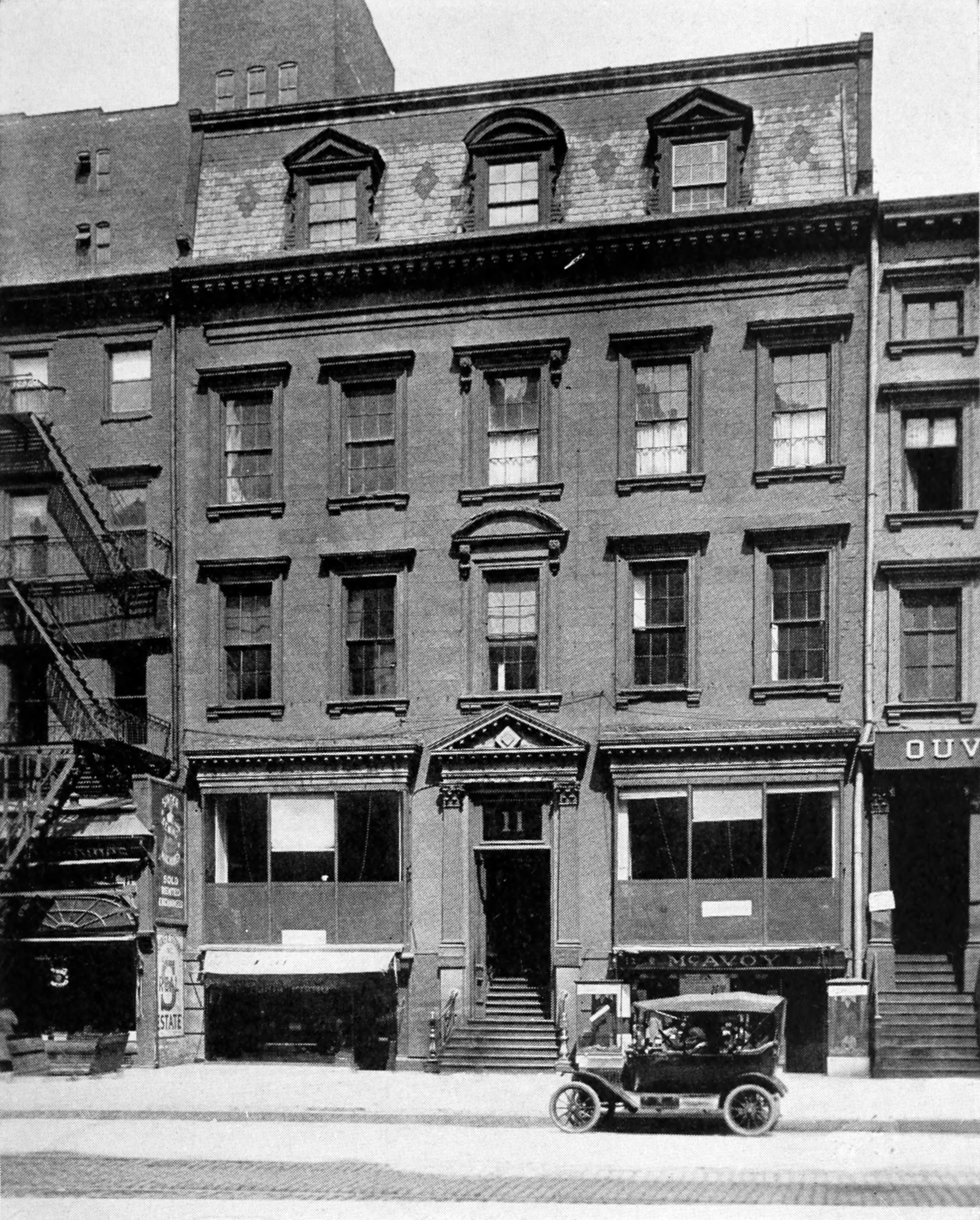
Biograph's Manhattan studio, where the comedy's interior scenes were filmed in February 1909

- John R. Cumpson as Mr. Eddie Jones
- Florence Lawrence as Mrs. Emma Jones
- Anita Hendrie as neighbor
- Mack Sennett as police officer
- Gertrude Robinson as the maid
- Owen Moore as extra in crowd
- Linda Arvidson as extra in crowd
- Anita Hendrie as extra in crowd
- Charles Avery as extra in crowd
- David Miles as extra in crowd
- Flora Finch as extra in crowd
- Charles Inslee as extra in crowd
- Gladys Egan in unverified role, likely another crowd extra

== Production ==
The screenplay, written by Frank E. Woods, was produced at Biograph's main studio, which in 1909 was located inside a large renovated brownstone mansion in New York City, in Manhattan, at 11 East 14th Street. Filmed in two days, on February 24 and 25, director Griffith and cinematographer "Billy" Bitzer used interior sets at the studio and shot exterior scenes on location along Perry Street in the city, just a short distance west of Biograph's facility.

=== Biograph's uncredited actors ===
Identifying cast members in early Biograph releases such as Jones and His New Neighbors is made more difficult by the fact that the studio, as a matter of company policy, did not begin publicly crediting its performers on screen, in trade publications, or in newspaper advertisements until years after this short's release. All the players in this short were unidentified in their roles on screen and in print, as were the rest of Biograph's relatively small staff of "photoplayers" and crew members in other productions at the time. When this comedy was released, Lawrence was already gaining widespread celebrity among filmgoers. Few people, though, outside the motion picture industry knew her name, so in 1909 and for the remainder of her time working at Biograph, the actress was referred to by admirers and in news articles in the media simply as "'the Biograph girl'". Biograph would not reveal the names of its actors nor post them on theater bills until 1913.

=== Biograph's "Jonesy comedies", 1908-1909 ===
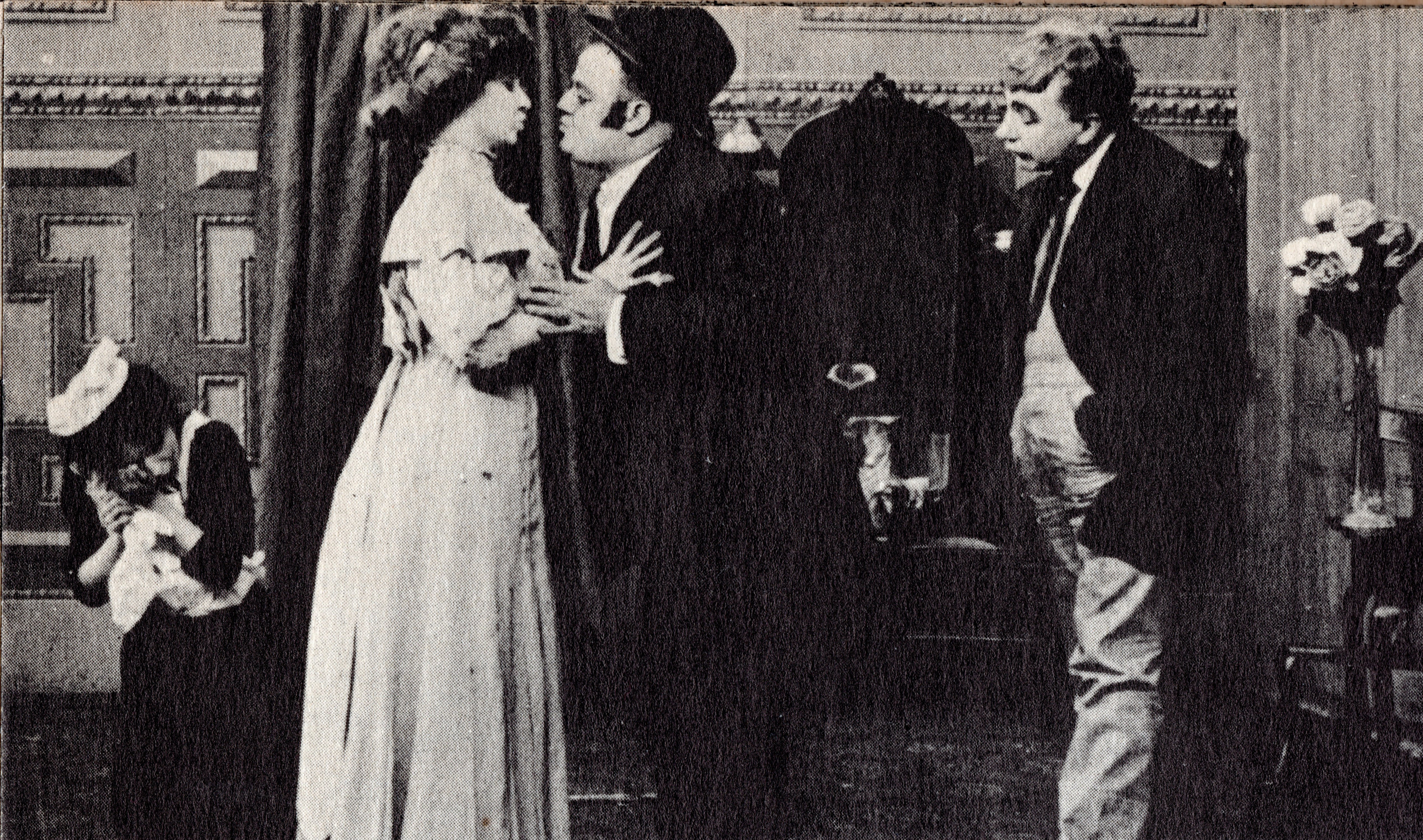
Cumpson (center) and Lawrence kiss in one of the earlier "Jones shorts", Mrs. Jones Entertains (1909)

Jones and His New Neighbors is the eighth film in a series of thirteen very popular Biograph comedy shorts that were written by Frank E. Woods in 1908 and 1909. Twelve of those films were directed by Griffith and starred the duo of Cumpson and Lawrence, who portrayed a married couple named "Mr. and Mrs. Bibbs" in their first screen performance together but thereafter as the husband and wife characters "Eddie and Emma Jones" for the rest of the series. (Note: The 1908 short His Day of Rest, released on May 29 that year, is considered by some film historians to be Biograph's first "Jones" film because its screenplay was also written by Frank E. Woods and contained situations and characterizations that are identical to those found in the later Jones comedies. That film, however, was not directed by Griffith but by Wallace McCutcheon, and it starred Edward Dillon as a "Mr. Bibbs", not as the character of Mr. Jones. Although Cumpson and Lawrence were also identified as Mr. and Mrs. Benjamin Bibbs in their first short together as a married couple, A Smoked Husband (1908), in all of the remaining installments in the series, the actors performed only as Mr. and Mrs. Jones.) (Note: In a few 1909 references to the Mr. Jones character in trade publications and newspapers, his first name is given as "Eddy" instead of "Eddie", although the latter is by far the predominant spelling. Also, screenwriter Frank E. Wood's full name for his character is cited as "Edward Everett Jones" in Biograph's later promotion for the short Jones and the Lady Book Agent, which can be seen on page 583 in the May 8, 1909 issue of the trade publication The Moving Picture World.) Released between September 1908 and September 1909, all of the "Jonesy" films from that period feature Cumpson as the portly and frequently "bewildered" Mr. Jones and Florence Lawrence as his pretty, much younger spouse. The other shorts in the series with Cumpson and Lawrence are A Smoked Husband (1908), Mr. Jones at the Ball (1908), Mrs. Jones Entertains (1909), Mr. Jones Has a Card Party (1909), The Joneses Have Amateur Theatricals (1909), His Wife's Mother (1909), Jones and the Lady Book Agent (1909), Her First Biscuits (1909), The Peachbasket Hat (1909), Jones' Burglar (1909), and Mrs. Jones' Lover (1909) (Note: The 1909 short Mrs. Jones' Lover is also cited in some contemporary publications with the alternate title I Want My Hat.) The general structure and comedic style of Jones and His New Neighbors replicated those found in all the releases in the series, common traits described by biographer Kelly R. Brown in her 1999 book Florence Lawrence, The Biograph Girl: America's First Movie Star. "The stories", Brown writes, "were pure slapstick comedy, straight from vaudeville, where usually a misunderstanding escalated into the kind of comic violence which audiences loved."

According to Florence Lawrence, her screen partner Cumpson seemed ill-suited by temperament to be a comedian, especially a lead in Jones and His New Neighbors or in any of the other films in the series. Lawrence in 1915—two years after Cumpson's death—described working with him in an interview published in the widely read fan magazine Photoplay. In that interview she said she enjoyed performing with him at Biograph, and "Mrs. Jones" also provided some insight into the success of this film and the others in the series:

It was Mr. Cumpson who helped to make the "Jonesy" pictures so popular, for he was "Jonesy." When we undertook the first picture there was no intention of making a series of comedy productions, but when the exchanges began asking for more and more "Jonesy" pictures, we kept it up until I left the Biograph Company. Mr. Cumpson was the most serious comedian I have ever known. Nothing was ever funny to him, and he never tried to be funny. When all the rest of the company would laugh at something he had said or done he would become indignant, thinking we were making fun of him.

== Release and reception ==
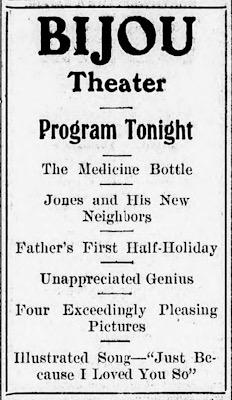
Newspaper promotion for Biograph and Edison split-reel films in Missoula, Montana, May 1909

After its release on March 29, 1909, the film and its split-reel companion circulated to theaters throughout the United States and continued to be promoted for weeks in film-industry publications and then into the early months of 1910 by newspapers in small, remote communities. A reviewer of the short in the April 3 issue of the New York trade journal The Moving Picture World found the neighborhood "complications" caused by Mr. Jones' confused antics "funny even if overdone." Only two days after the film's release, it was already being screened far from New York, in Ogden, Utah. The Orpheum Theatre there on March 31 informed the readers of the local newspaper that yet another "Jones" film had arrived, announcing "Here's a chance to laugh. Mr. Jones is with us again in Jones And His New Neighbors." The same week, in Virginia, The Richmond Palladium and Sun-Telegram informed local moviegoers about the short's screening at the Arcade Theatre. Recycling comments about the comedy published in the March 27, 1909 issue of The Moving Picture World, the newspaper asked, "We are wont to say poor Jones, but are we sincere?" "For if it wasn't for Jones' misfortunes", the paper noted, "we would miss many a hearty laugh." In West Virginia a month later, the Dixie Theatre in Fairmont, invited residents to come see "our favorites, Mr. and Mrs. Jones, in a laughable comedy to splendid advantage"

Then, over eight months later and more than 3,400 miles northwest of Fairmont, theatrical copies of Jones and His New Neighbors and its companion short The Medicine Bottle arrived in the United States territory of Alaska, in the port town of Skagway. There the comedy was advertised on January 27, 1910, in The Daily Alaskan, which labels it a "screaming farce" and encourages readers to see it the next night at the local Elks' Hall. The Skagway newspaper, however, in its advertisement mistitles Jones and His New Neighbors and lists it instead as "Mr. Jones in the W[r]ong House".

== Preservation status ==
Photographic prints and a film negative and positive of Jones and His New Neighbors survive in the Library of Congress (LOC), which holds a 173-foot paper roll of contact prints produced directly frame-by-frame from the comedy's original 35mm master negative. (Note: The print of Jones and His New Neighbors preserved in the Library of Congress is numbered "FLA5503"; the negative copy, "FRA2377".) Submitted by Biograph to the United States government in 1909, shortly before the film's release, the roll is part of the original documentation required by federal authorities for motion picture companies to obtain copyright protection for their productions. While the library's paper roll of the film is certainly not projectable, a negative copy of the roll's paper images was made and transferred onto modern polyester-based safety film stock to produce a positive print for screening. Those copies were made as part of a preservation project carried out during the 1950s and early 1960s by Kemp R. Niver and other LOC staff, who restored more than 3,000 early paper rolls of film images from the library's collection and created safety-stock copies.

== See also ==
D. W. Griffith filmography
