= The Call of the Wild (1908 film) =

1908 film directed by D. W. Griffith

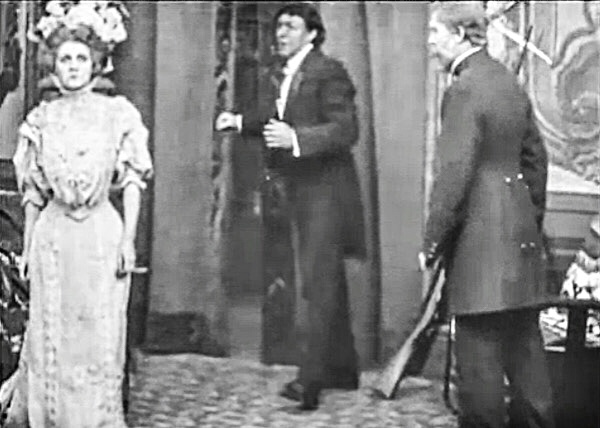
- Scene with actors (from left) Florence Lawrence, Charles Inslee, and Harry Solter
- Directed by: D. W. Griffith
- Written by: D. W. Griffith
- Starring: Charles Inslee; Harry Solter; Florence Lawrence
- Cinematography: G. W. Bitzer; Arthur Marvin
- Production companies: American Mutoscope and Biograph Company, New York City
- Distributed by: American Mutoscope and Biograph Company
- Release date: October 27, 1908
- Running time: Originally 14–15 minutes (1 reel, 988 feet)
- Country: United States
- Languages: Silent; English intertitles

The Call of the Wild is a 1908 American short silent Western film directed by D. W. Griffith and produced by the American Mutoscope and Biograph Company. The short, a "one-reeler", stars Charles Inslee, Harry Solter and Florence Lawrence. Its interior scenes were shot at Biograph's studio facilities in New York City, and its exteriors were filmed on location in Coytesville, today one of the oldest communities in Fort Lee, New Jersey.

Prints of this short survive, including in the film archives of the Library of Congress. Despite its title, the motion picture is not an adaption of Jack London's 1903 adventure novel The Call of the Wild. Its content is entirely unrelated to that literary work.

== Plot ==
The story, set in the late 1800s, is a cross-cultural melodrama about Gladys Penrose (Florence Lawrence), a young white woman who rejects the professed love of George Redfeather (Charles Inslee). George, a Native American, has lived for years in white society and has just returned to the American West from Pennsylvania, where he graduated with high honors and was a football star at a prominent "Indian boarding school" in Carlisle. In recognition of George's scholastic and athletic achievements, Gladys's father, a lieutenant in the United States Army, holds a formal reception and dance for the local "hero". George, however, has fallen desperately in love with Gladys, and at the party he openly expresses his feelings to her as well as his desire to marry her one day. She angrily dismisses his advances, and her father, also angered, orders the young man out of the Penrose house.

After leaving the party, George goes back to the small house in town where he living. Once back in his bedroom—humiliated and infuriated by his treatment—he strips off his "white man's" formal evening attire and dons traditional native buckskin clothing as well as an elaborate war bonnet. He then leaves the town and rejoins his tribe "in the wilds". Back with his "own people", George agitates a small group of his fellow braves with a fiery speech and bottles of whiskey, and then, after becoming inebriated, he returns by himself to the town to spy on Gladys and to observe her activities. When he sees her go riding alone on horseback into the countryside, George assembles six of his braves, and they chase and capture Gladys while she is gathering wildflowers. George now tries to force his affections on her as his men watch and laugh in the background. Gladys struggles and rebuffs him. She then points to the sky and implores George to allow her to leave, reminding him not to abandon the teachings of God or to ignore the constant "presence of the All Powerful Master". Suddenly ashamed and contrite, George drops to his knees. When he rises, he leads her back toward her horse, but the other braves attempt to stop her. George pushes his men away, draws his knife, and threatens them if they do not allow her to go. The men back off as he helps Gladys onto her horse. After he kisses her hand, she departs. He now finds her handkerchief on the ground, presses it to his face, and exhibits remorse again for his actions. His men appear to be disgusted by this change in his behavior. George rides off alone, still clutching Gladys's handkerchief and visibly sad. After holding the handkerchief to his face one last time, he drops it to the ground and leaves the scene.

== Cast ==
PLAY film; runtime 00:14:09.

- Charles Inslee as George Redfeather
- Harry Solter as Lieutenant Penrose
- Florence Lawrence as Gladys Penrose
- George Gebhardt as The Indian agent
- John R. Cumpson as The Penroses' Chinese servant
- Mack Sennett as Party guest / Indian warrior
- Arthur Johnson as Party guest / Indian warrior
- Claire McDowell as Party guest

== Production ==
The scenes inside Lieutenant Penrose's home and in George's bedroom were filmed at Biograph's New York studio, which was situated in a large converted brownstone residence at 11 East 14th Street in Manhattan. All the outdoor scenes were shot on location about 12 miles from the studio, across the Hudson River, in the community of Coytesville in Fort Lee, New Jersey. Later, in 1915, in an autobiographical feature for the movie fan magazine Photoplay, Florence Lawrence described working on Biograph's "wild and woolly" screenplays in the borough:

...peaceful Coytesville, New Jersey...was the scene of most all the sensational western dramas until about three years ago [1912], and this in spite of the fact that it was almost impossible to make a scene that even remotely resembled the west. There was always a telephone pole around close enough to come within range of the camera which was never discovered until after the scene was photographed.

Filming at both the New York studio and Coytesville were completed between September 17–25, 1908. Eight days prior to the one-reeler's release, the production was copyrighted by Biograph and assigned the registration number H117205. That copyright protection expired long ago. Since this film was produced and publicly exhibited in the United States prior to 1931, it is now in the public domain and free for use without restrictions.

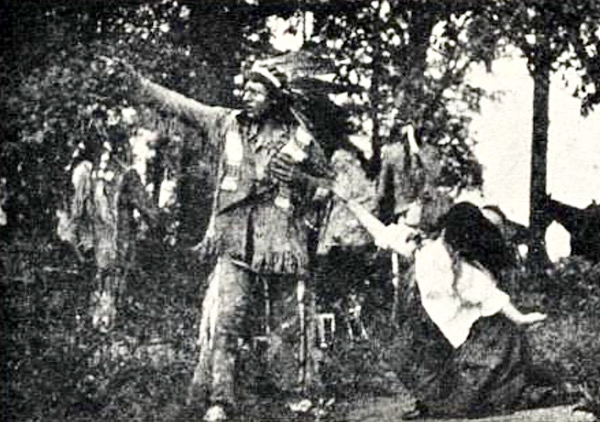
Actors Inslee (left) and Lawrence on location in Coytesville, New Jersey, September 1909

Biograph's selection of Florence Lawrence as a costar in the production was not surprising at the time. She was in her second year working in films, but during that relatively short time she had gained considerable screen experience and was already one of the more popular actors in Biograph's stock company of players. The year after the release of this short, studio executives and theater audiences were referring to her as "The Biograph Girl", and by 1910 Lawrence was among the leading ladies in silent films.

== Release and reception, 1908 ==
The melodrama generally received very positive reviews in the days and weeks after its release in 1908. In its October 31 issue that year, the New York-based trade journal The Moving Picture World provides an additional overview of the short's plot as well as a concise assessment of its presentation. "The film", reports the journal, "is most thrilling in situations, beautiful in photography and superbly acted." Reviews in newspapers across the country were also positive. The Morning Astorian, for example, in Astoria, Oregon, also summarizes the short's plot in its November 18 edition and then urges its readers to see the film before its run at the local Grand Theatre ends:

The picture tells a story of a young Indian who gained fame as a hero in a college football game. He comes in contact with a distinguished army officer who introduces the young buck to his daughter. The Indian falls in love with the young lady and asks her to become his wife; she refuses, he then becomes desperate and responds to "the call of the wild" where he rejoins his own kind and seeks to forget his sorrow with over-indulgence in firewater.
The picture is intensely interesting and exciting throughout and is probably one of the best seen in this city for some time. Tonight will be the last opportunity to witness "The Call of the Wild" and is well worth the time of anyone to pay the Grand a visit.

== Preservation status ==
The playable copy of the film featured on this page was produced from a 376-foot roll of paper prints copied from the production's original footage. That roll of images, preserved in Library of Congress (LOC), was made in 1908 by Biograph, which used its now-lost 35mm master negative of The Call of the Wild to print frame-by-frame positive images of the drama onto strips of photographic paper. Submitted by Biograph to the United States government shortly before the film's release, the roll of paper prints is part of the original documentation required by federal authorities when motion-picture companies applied for copyright protection for their productions. While the library's paper print record is not projectable, such paper copies can be transferred onto modern polyester-based safety film stock for screening. In fact, during the 1950s and early 1960s, Kemp R. Niver and other LOC staff restored more than 3,000 such paper rolls in the library's collection and transferred many of them, including The Call of the Wild, to safety stock.

== See also ==
D. W. Griffith filmography
