= Florence Lawrence =

Canadian-American actress (1886–1938)

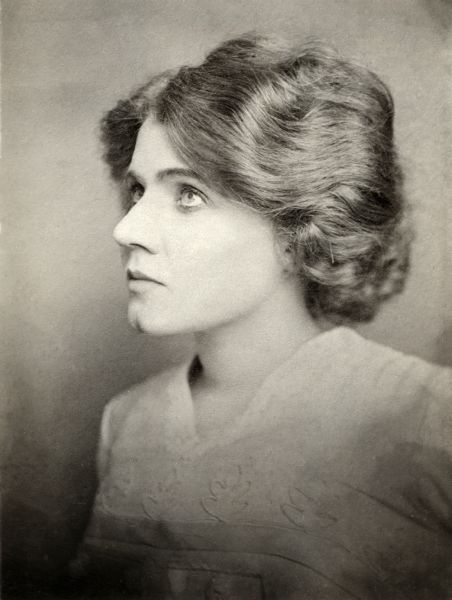
- Lawrence in 1908
- Born: Florence Annie Bridgwood; January 2, 1886; Hamilton, Ontario, Canada
- Died: December 28, 1938 (aged 52); Beverly Hills, California, U.S.
- Resting place: Hollywood Forever Cemetery
- Other names: The Biograph Girl; The Imp Girl
- Occupations: Actress; inventor
- Years active: 1906–1938
- Known for: The Girl and the Outlaw; Resurrection; Mr. Jones at the Ball; Mrs. Jones Entertains; The Broken Oath; Her Humble Ministry; The Maelstrom; The Unfoldment; The Angel of the Studio; Betrayed by a Handprint
- Spouses: Harry Solter (m. 1908; died 1920) Charles Woodring (m. 1921; div. 1932) Henry Bolton (m. 1933; div. 1934)

Florence Lawrence (born Florence Annie Bridgwood; January 2, 1886 – December 28, 1938) was a Canadian-American actress and inventor. She is often referred to as the "first movie star", and was long thought to be the first film actor to be named publicly until evidence published in 2019 indicated that the first named film star was French actor Max Linder. At the height of her fame in the 1910s, she was known as the "Biograph Girl" for work as one of the leading ladies in silent films from the Biograph Company. She appeared in almost 300 films for various motion picture companies throughout her career. Outside of her film career, she is best known for inventing the car turn and brake signals.

== Early life ==
Florence Annie Bridgwood was born on 2 January 1886 in Hamilton, Ontario. She was the youngest of three children of George Bridgwood, an English-born carriage builder and Charlotte "Lotta" Bridgwood (née Dunn), a vaudeville actress. Charlotte Bridgwood had emigrated to Canada from Ireland after the Great Famine with her family as a child. She was known professionally as Lotta Lawrence and was the leading lady and director of the Lawrence Dramatic Company. At the age of three, Lawrence made her debut onstage with her mother in a song and dance routine. When she was old enough to memorize lines of dialogue, she performed with her mother and other members of the Lawrence Dramatic Company in dramatic plays. After performing tear-jerking dramas like Dora Thorne and East Lynne began to depress Lawrence, her mother dropped them from the company's repertoire. While Lawrence performed on stage at the behest of her mother, she recalled that she enjoyed the work but did not like the traveling that all vaudeville performers were required to do. By the age of six, Lawrence had earned the nickname "Baby Flo, the Child Wonder".

On February 18, 1898, George Bridgwood died from accidental coal gas poisoning at his home in Hamilton (Lawrence's parents had been separated since she was four years old). Lotta Lawrence moved the family from Hamilton to Buffalo, New York to live with her mother Ann Dunn. She chose to stop bringing her children along for stage performances and for the first time, Florence was enrolled in school. After graduating, Lawrence rejoined her mother's dramatic company. However, her mother disbanded the Lawrence Dramatic Company shortly thereafter; the two moved to New York City around 1906.

== Early career: film and stage ==
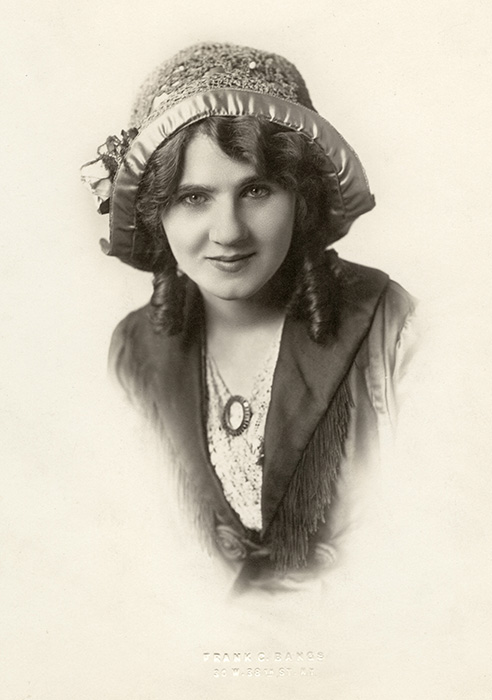
Portrait of Lawrence by Frank C. Bangs Studio, c. 1908

Lawrence was one of several Canadian pioneers in the film industry who were attracted by the rapid growth of the fledgling motion picture business. In 1906, she appeared in her first motion picture. The next year, she appeared in 38 movies for the Vitagraph film company. During the spring and summer of 1906, Lawrence auditioned for a number of Broadway productions, but she did not have success. However, on December 27, 1906, she was hired by the Edison Manufacturing Company to play Daniel Boone's daughter in Daniel Boone; or, Pioneer Days in America. She got the part because she knew how to ride a horse. Both she and her mother received parts and were paid five dollars per day for two weeks of outdoor filming in freezing weather.

In 1907, she went to work for the Vitagraph Company in Brooklyn, New York, acting as Moya, an Irish peasant girl in a one-reel version of Dion Boucicault's The Shaughraun. She returned briefly to stage acting, playing the leading role in a road show production of Melville B. Raymond's Seminary Girls. Her mother played her last role in this production. After touring with the roadshow for a year, Lawrence resolved that she would "never again lead that gypsy life". In 1908, she returned to Vitagraph where she played the lead role in The Dispatch Bearer. Largely as a result of her equestrian skills, she received parts in 11 films in the next five months.

=== Biograph Studios ===
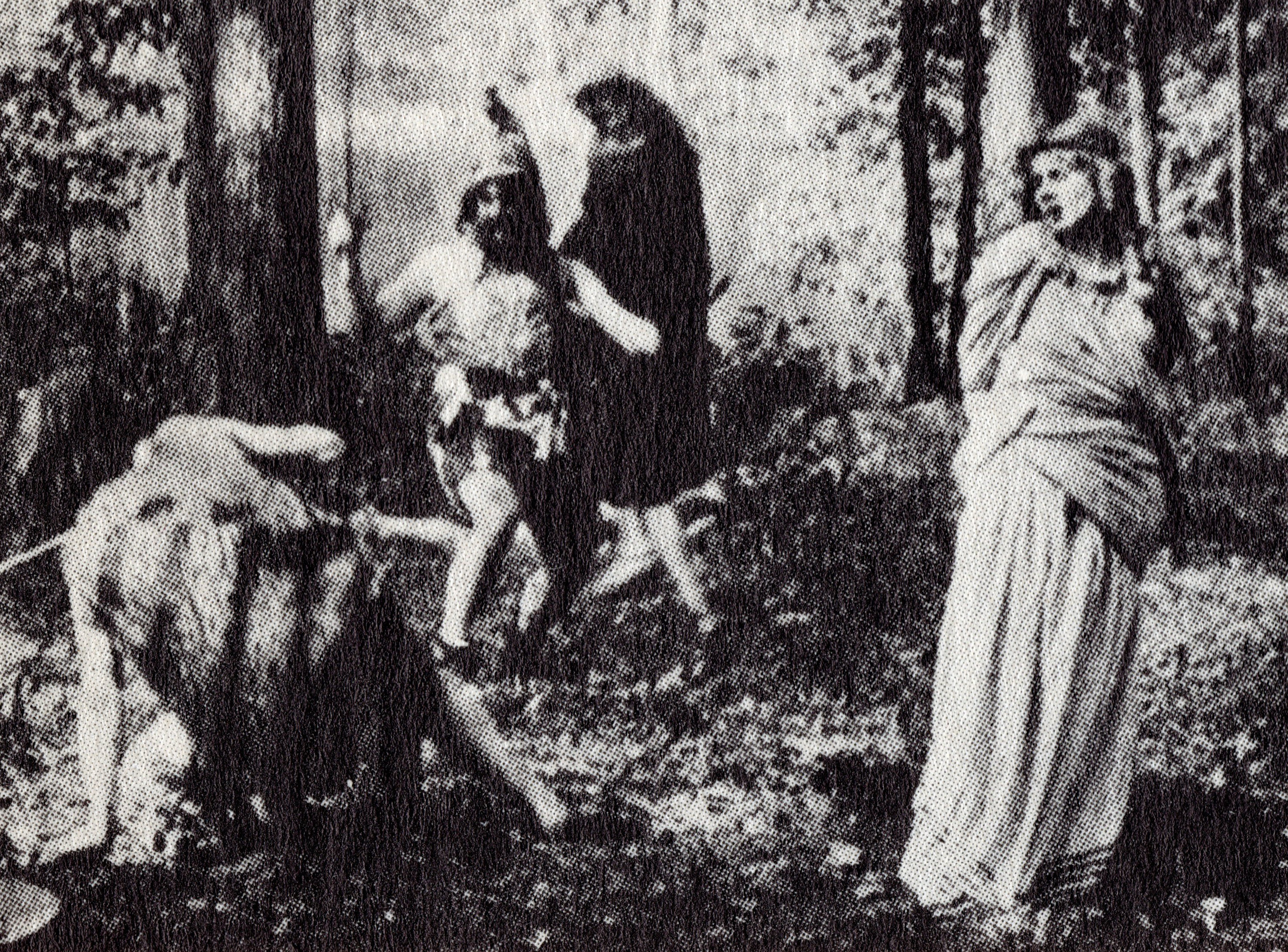
Florence Lawrence in Ingomar, the Barbarian (1908)

Also at Vitagraph was a young actor, Harry Solter, who was looking for "a young, beautiful equestrian girl" to star in a film to be produced by the Biograph Studios under the direction of D. W. Griffith. Griffith, the most prominent producer-director at Biograph Studios, had noticed the beautiful blonde-haired woman in one of Vitagraph's films. Because the film's actors received no mention, Griffith had to make discreet inquiries to learn she was Florence Lawrence and to arrange a meeting. Griffith had intended to give the part to Florence Turner, Biograph's leading lady, but Lawrence managed to convince Solter and Griffith that she was the best suited for the starring role in The Girl and the Outlaw. With the Vitagraph Company, she had been earning $20 per week, working also as a costume seamstress over and above acting. Griffith offered her a job, acting only, for $25 per week.

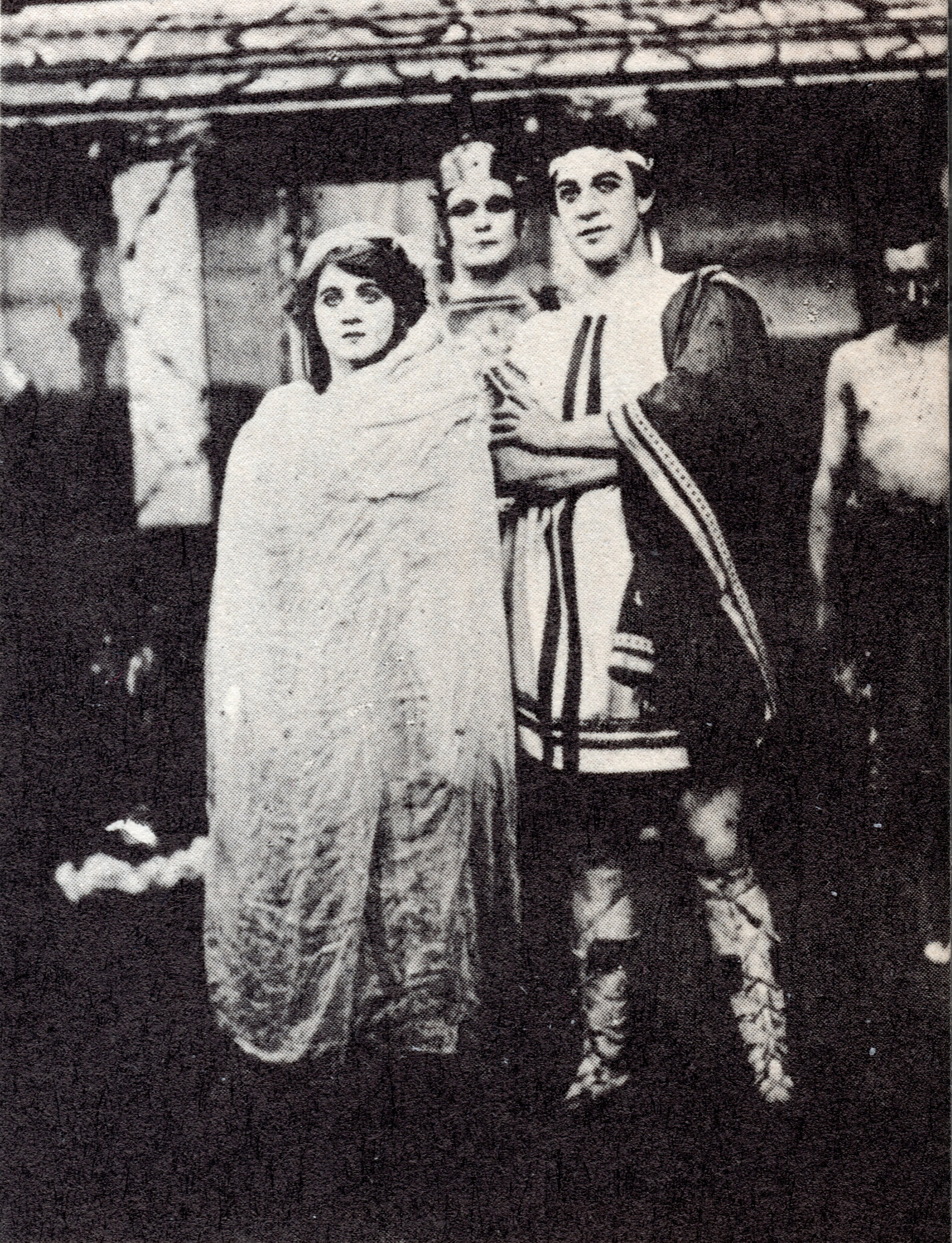
Florence Lawrence, Harry Solter and Mack Sennett in The Slave (1909)

After her success in this role, she appeared as a society belle in Betrayed by a Handprint and as an Indian in The Red Girl. In total, she had parts in most of the 60 films directed by Griffith in 1908. Toward the end of 1908, Lawrence married Harry Solter. Lawrence gained much popularity, but because her name never was publicized, fans began writing to the studio asking to know her identity. Even after she had gained wide recognition, particularly after starring in the comedy series Mr. and Mrs. Jones and the highly successful Resurrection, Biograph Studios refused to publicly announce her name and fans simply called her the "Biograph Girl". During cinema's formative years, silent screen actors were not named because studio owners feared that fame might lead to demands for higher wages and because many actors were embarrassed to be performing pantomime in motion pictures. She continued to work for Biograph in 1909. Her demand to be paid by the week rather than daily was met, and she received double the normal rate.

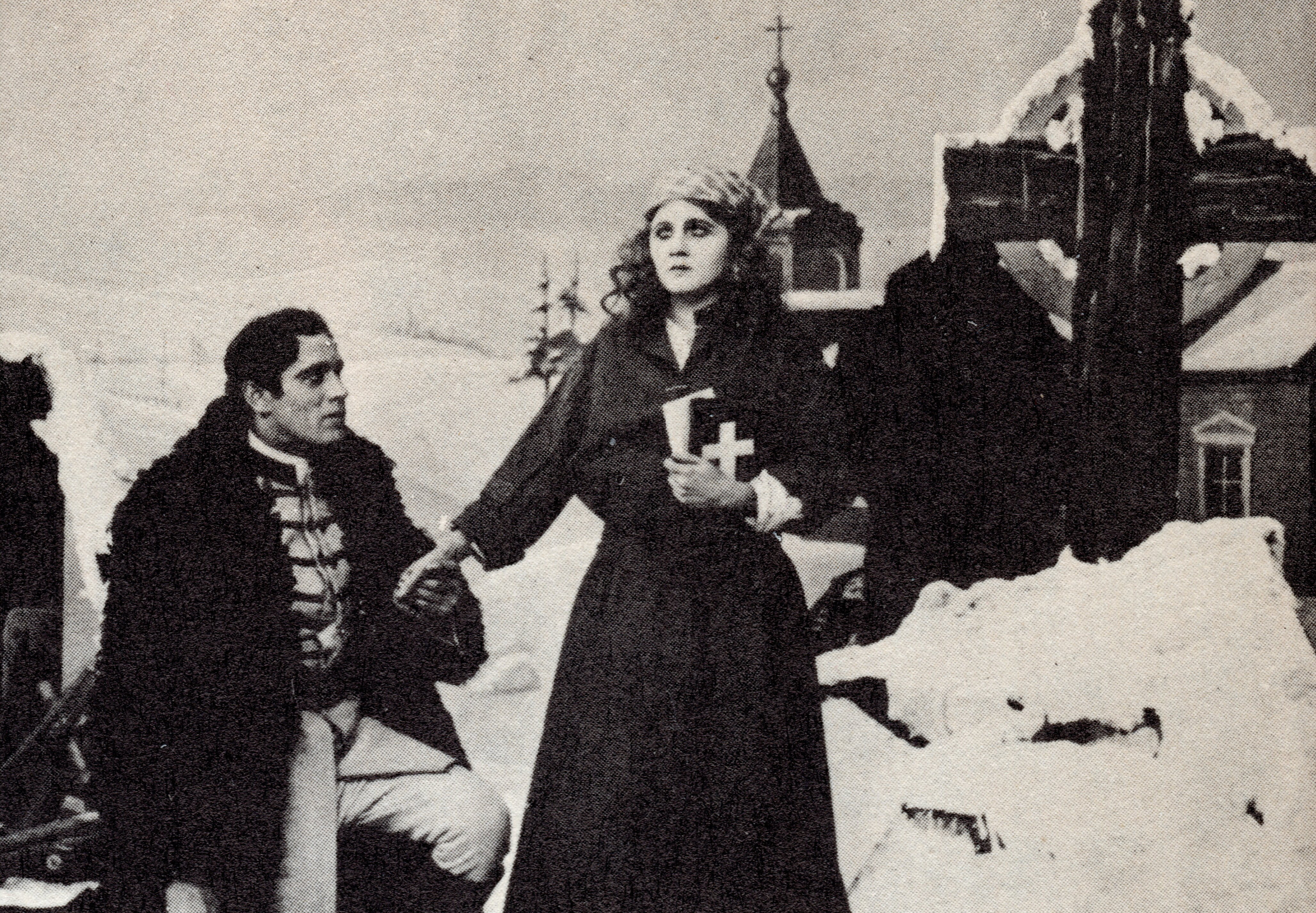
Arthur V. Johnson and Florence Lawrence in Resurrection (1909)

=== Independent Moving Pictures Company ===
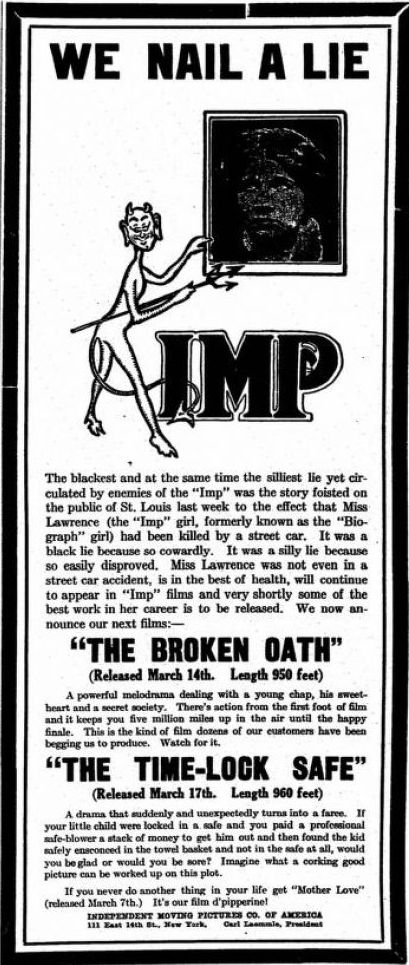
Carl Laemmle's promotion of The Broken Oath starring Lawrence (Billboard 1910)

Finding themselves 'at liberty', Lawrence and Solter in 1909 were able to join the Independent Moving Pictures Company of America (IMP). The company, founded by Carl Laemmle, the owner of a film exchange (who later absorbed IMP into Universal Pictures, of which he was founder and president), was looking for experienced filmmakers and actors. Needing a star, he lured Lawrence away from Biograph by promising to give her a marquee. First, Laemmle organized a publicity stunt by starting a rumor that Lawrence had been killed by a street car in New York City. Then, after gaining much media attention, he placed ads in the newspapers that announced "We nail a lie" and included a photo of Lawrence. The ad declared she is alive and well and making The Broken Oath, a new movie for his IMP Film Company to be directed by Solter.

Laemmle had Lawrence make a personal appearance in St. Louis, Missouri in March 1910 with her leading man to show her fans that she was very much alive, making her one of the early performers not already famous in another medium to be identified by name by her studio.

=== Lubin Studios ===
By late 1910, Lawrence left IMP to work for Lubin Studios, advising her fellow Canadian, the 18-year-old Mary Pickford, to take her place as IMP's star.

=== Victor Film Company ===
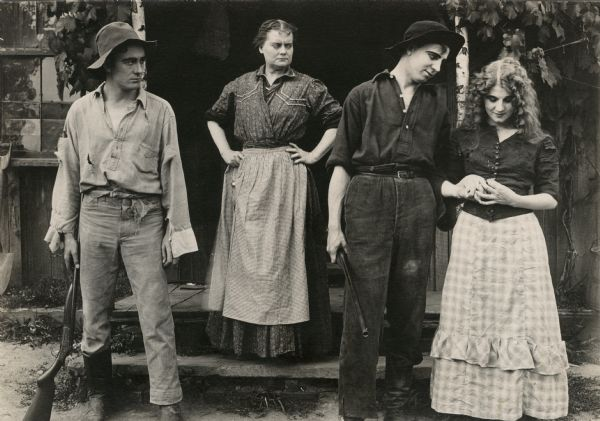
Scene of Lawrence (far right) in 1912 Victor production After All; other cast are (from left) Owen Moore, Victory Bateman on step, and Gladden James.

In 1912, Lawrence and Solter made a deal with Carl Laemmle, forming their own company. Laemmle gave them complete artistic freedom in the company, named Victor Film Company, and paid Lawrence $500 per week as the leading lady, and Solter $200 per week as director. They established a film studio in Fort Lee, New Jersey and made a number of films starring Lawrence and Owen Moore, then sold to Universal Pictures in 1913. With this new prosperity, Florence was able to realize a 'lifelong dream,' buying a 50-acre (20 ha) estate in River Vale, New Jersey. In August 1912, she had a fight with her husband, in which he "made cruel remarks about his mother-in-law". He left and went to Europe. However, he wrote "sad" letters to her every day, telling her of his plans to commit suicide. His letters "softened her feelings", and they were re-united in November 1912. Lawrence announced her intention to retire.

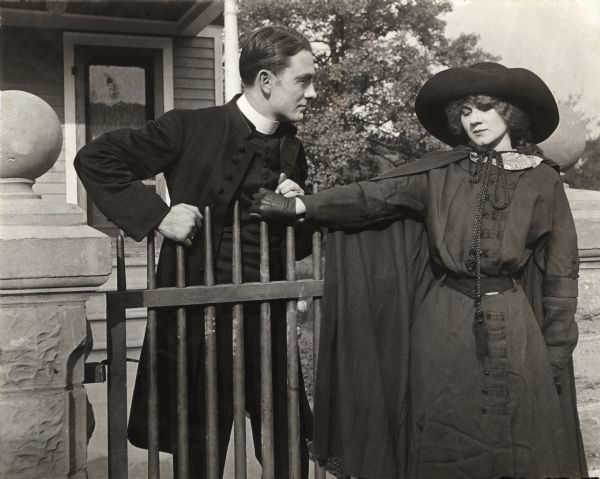
Owen Moore talks to Florence Lawrence in the silent drama, The Redemption of Riverton (1912)

She was persuaded to return to work in 1914 for her company (Victor Film Company), which had been acquired by Universal Studios. During the filming of Pawns of Destiny in 1915, a staged fire got out of control. Lawrence was burned, her hair was singed, and she suffered a serious fall which fractured her spine. She went into shock for months. She returned to work, but collapsed after the film was completed. To add to her problems, Universal refused to pay her medical expenses, leaving Lawrence feeling betrayed. In mid-1916, she returned to work for Universal and completed Elusive Isabel. However, the strain of working took its toll on her, and she suffered a serious relapse. She was completely paralyzed for four months. In 1921, she traveled to Hollywood to attempt a comeback, but had little success. She received a leading role in a minor melodrama (The Unfoldment), and then two supporting roles. All her film work after 1924 was in uncredited bit parts.

== Automotive inventions ==
Besides her film career, Lawrence is credited with designing the first "auto signaling arm", a predecessor of the modern turn signal, along with the first mechanical brake signal. She did not patent these inventions, however, and as a result she received no credit for, nor profit from, either one.

== Personal life ==
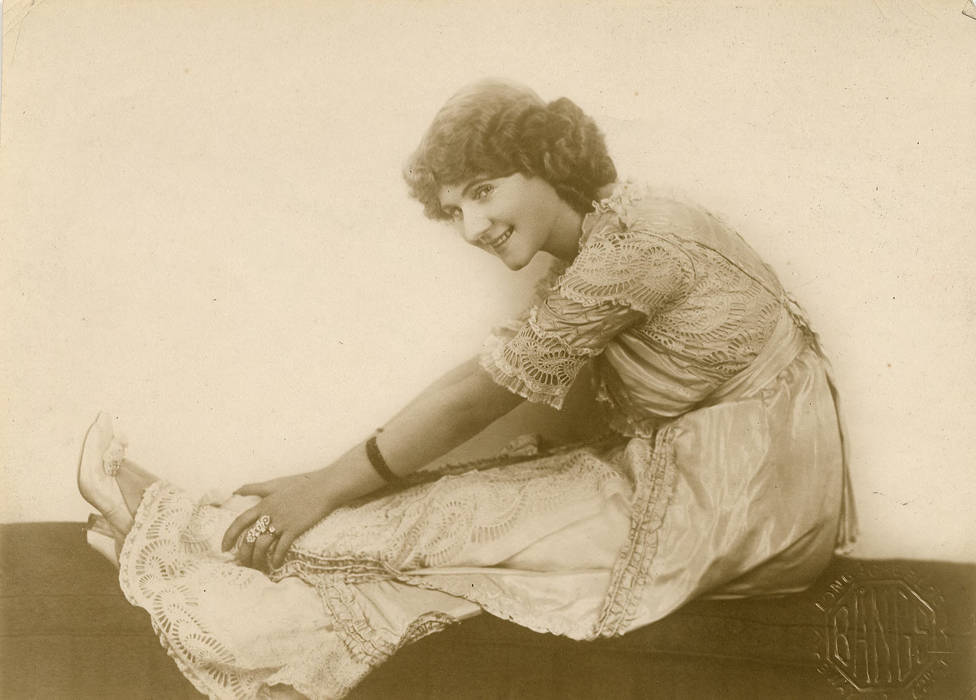
Florence Lawrence, silent film actress (1914)

Lawrence was married three times. Her first marriage was to actor, screenwriter and director Harry Solter in 1908. They remained married until Solter's death in 1920. She then married automobile salesman Charles Byrne Woodring in 1921. They separated in 1929; Lawrence was granted an interlocutory divorce in February 1931, which was finalized the following year. During the 1920s, Lawrence and Woodring opened a cosmetics store in Los Angeles called Hollywood Cosmetics. The store sold theatrical makeup and also sold a line of cosmetics that Lawrence developed. They continued their partnership after their separation in 1929, but the store was forced to close in 1931.

In 1933, Lawrence wed for the third and final time, to Henry Bolton, who turned out to be an abusive alcoholic and beat her severely. The union lasted five months.

== Later years ==
By the late 1920s, Lawrence's popularity had declined and she suffered several personal losses. She was devastated when her mother, to whom she was close, died suddenly in August 1929. Four months later, she separated from her second husband, Charles Woodring. While Lawrence earned a small fortune during her film career, she made many poor business decisions. She lost much of her fortune after the stock market crash in October 1929 and ensuing Great Depression. The cosmetics store that she and her second husband opened in Los Angeles also lost business because of the Depression, and the couple was forced to close its doors in 1931.

By the early 1930s, Lawrence's acting career consisted solely of extra and bit parts which were often uncredited. In 1936, Metro-Goldwyn-Mayer studio head Louis B. Mayer began giving extra and bit parts to former silent film actors for $75 per week. Lawrence, along with other "old timers" from the silent era whose careers had all but ended when sound films replaced silent films, signed with M-G-M. Lawrence remained with the studio until her death.

In mid-1937, Lawrence was diagnosed with what her doctor described as "a bone disease which produces anemia and depression." The disease was likely myelofibrosis, a rare bone marrow disease, or agnogenic myeloid metaplasia, both of which were incurable at the time. Due to her poor health and chronic pain, Lawrence became depressed but attempted to keep working. Around this time she moved into a home on Westbourne Drive in West Hollywood, with a studio worker named Robert "Bob" Brinlow and his sister.

== Death ==
At 1 p.m. on December 28, 1938, Lawrence phoned the offices of M-G-M where she was to report to work that afternoon, claiming that she was ill. Sometime later in the afternoon, Lawrence ingested ant poison and cough syrup at her home in West Hollywood. Accounts differ as to how Lawrence was discovered; some media reports stated her neighbor Marian Menzer heard her screams, while others say that Lawrence called Menzer stating that she poisoned herself. Menzer called an ambulance, and Lawrence was rushed to Beverly Hills Emergency Hospital. Doctors were unable to save Lawrence, who died at 2:45 p.m. Lawrence left a suicide note in her home addressed to her housemate Bob Brinlow, stating:

Dear Bob,

Call Dr. Wilson. I am tired. Hope this works. Good bye, my darling. They can't cure me, so let it go at that.
Lovingly, Florence – P.S. You've all been swell guys. Everything is yours.

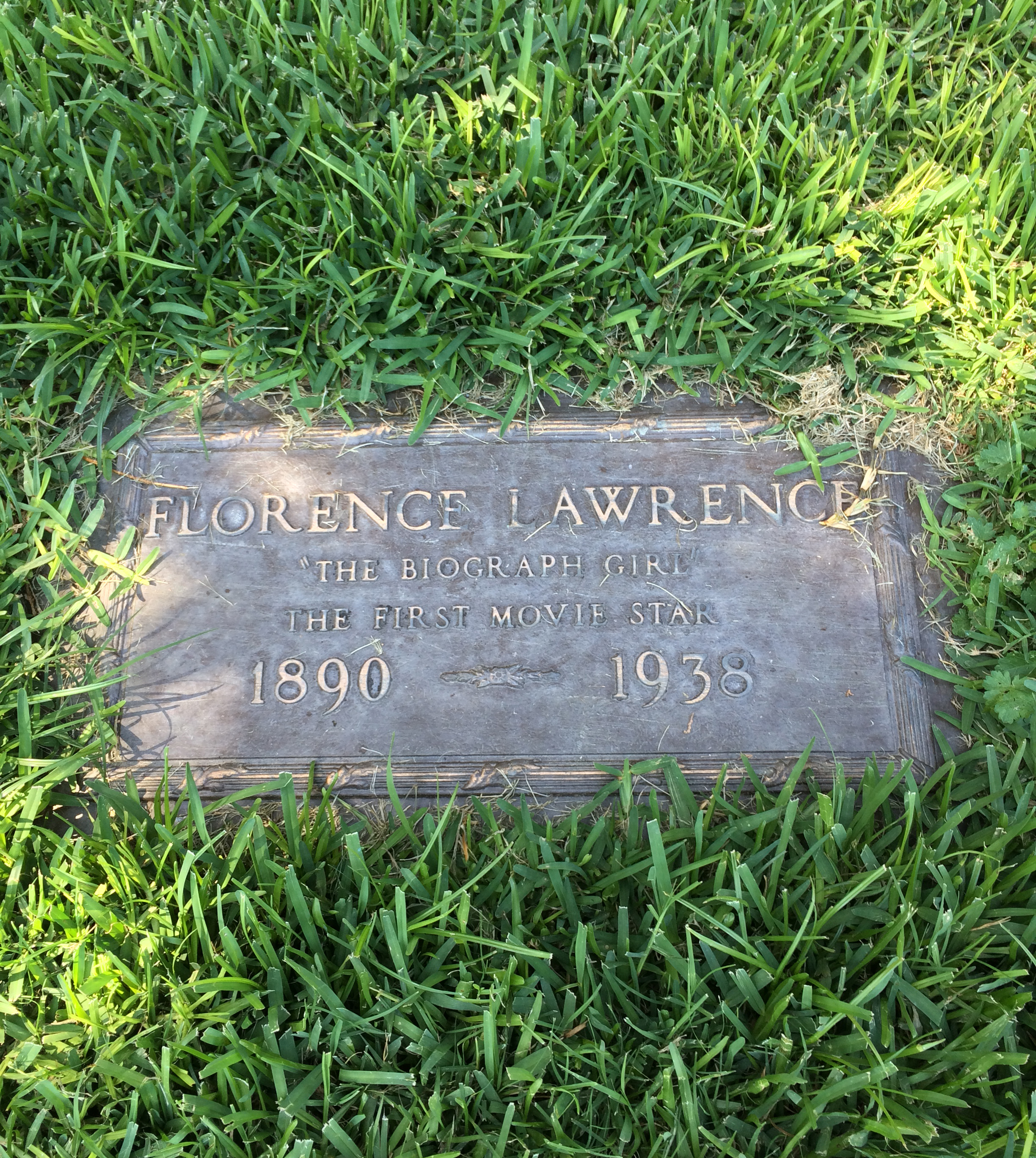
Lawrence's gravestone, Hollywood Forever Cemetery

Lawrence's death was ruled a "probable suicide" owing to her "ill health". The Motion Picture & Television Fund paid for Lawrence's funeral, held on December 30, and for her unmarked grave in the Hollywood Cemetery (now Hollywood Forever Cemetery) in Hollywood. Her grave remained unmarked until 1991, when an anonymous British actor paid for a memorial marker for her. (Note: Some sources name Roddy McDowall as the anonymous donor.) It reads: "The Biograph Girl/The First Movie Star". The date of birth on Lawrence's headstone is given as 1890. This inaccuracy was also stated on her death certificate filled out by the coroner. Lawrence's biographer, Kelly R. Brown, owed this mistake to "Lawrence's own brand of fiction" as she routinely subtracted years off her age. The mistake was repeated by the Pierce Brothers Mortuary, where Lawrence's funeral was held, although most obituaries printed her correct year of birth: 1886.

== Cultural references ==
In William J. Mann's novel The Biograph Girl (2000), Mann blends the facts of Lawrence's life with fiction. Instead of fading into oblivion and committing suicide, Lawrence, with the help of a doctor, fools the public into thinking she committed suicide. A journalist discovers Lawrence at the nursing home where she has lived secretly, and he decides to write a biography of her.

== Filmography ==
=== Short subject ===
Year	Title	Role	Notes
1906	The Automobile Thieves	Female accomplice	
1907	Daniel Boone	Boones' daughter	
1907	The Boy, the Bust and the Bath		
1907	Athletic American Girls		Lost film
1907	Bargain Fiend; or, Shopping à la Mode		Lost film
1907	The Shaughraun	Moya	Lost film
1907	The Mill Girl		
1907	The Despatch Bearer; or, Through the Enemy's Lines		Lost film
1908	Cupid's Realm; or, A Game of Hearts		Lost film
1908	Macbeth	Banquet Guest	Lost film
1908	Romeo and Juliet	Juliet	
1908	Lady Jane's Flight	Lady Jane	Lost film
1908	The Viking's Daughter: The Story of the Ancient Norsemen	Theckla, the Viking's Daughter	Lost film
1908	Love Laughs at Locksmiths; an 18th Century Romance		Lost film
1908	The Bandit's Waterloo		
1908	Salome	Salome	Lost film
1908	Betrayed by a Handprint	Myrtle Vane	
1908	The Girl and the Outlaw	Woman	Lost film
1908	Behind the Scenes	Mrs. Bailey	
1908	The Red Girl	The Red Girl	
1908	The Heart of O'Yama	O'Yama	
1908	Where the Breakers Roar	At the Beach	
1908	A Smoked Husband	Mrs. Bibbs	
1908	Richard III		Lost film
1908	The Stolen Jewels	Mrs. Jenkins	
1908	The Devil	A Model	
1908	The Zulu's Heart	The Boer's Wife	
1908	Father Gets in the Game	First Couple	
1908	Ingomar, the Barbarian	Parthenia	
1908	The Vaquero's Vow	Wedding Party / In Bar	
1908	The Planter's Wife	Tomboy Nellie	
1908	Romance of a Jewess	Ruth Simonson	
1908	The Call of the Wild	Gladys Penrose	
1908	Concealing a Burglar	Mrs. Brown	Lost film
1908	Antony and Cleopatra	Cleopatra	
1908	After Many Years	Mrs. John Davis	
1908	The Pirate's Gold		Lost film
1908	The Taming of the Shrew	Katharina	
1908	The Song of the Shirt	Working Woman – 1st Sister	Incomplete film
1908	A Woman's Way		Lost film
1908	The Ingrate	The Trapper's Wife	Lost film
1908	An Awful Moment	Mrs. Mowbray	
1908	The Clubman and the Tramp	Bridget / Dinner Guest	
1908	Julius Caesar	Calpurnia	Lost film
1908	Money Mad	Bank Customer / Landlady	
1908	The Valet's Wife	Nurse	
1908	The Feud and the Turkey	Nellie Caufield's Sister	Lost film
1908	The Reckoning	The Wife	Lost film
1908	The Test of Friendship	Jennie Colman	Lost film
1908	The Dancer and the King: A Romantic Story of Spain		Lost film
1908	The Christmas Burglars	Mrs. Martin	Lost film
1908	Mr. Jones at the Ball	Mrs. Jones	
1908	The Helping Hand	At Brothel / Wedding Guest	Lost film
1908	A Calamitous Elopement		
1909	One Touch of Nature	Mrs. John Murray	Lost film
1909	Mrs. Jones Entertains	Mrs. Jones	Lost film
1909	The Honor of Thieves	Rachel Einstein	Lost film
1909	The Sacrifice	Mrs. Hardluck	Lost film
1909	Those Boys!	The Maid	Lost film
1909	The Criminal Hypnotist	The Maid	Lost film
1909	The Fascinating Mrs. Francis	Visitor	Lost film
1909	Mr. Jones Has a Card Party	Mrs. Jones	
1909	Those Awful Hats	Theatre Audience	Uncredited
1909	The Cord of Life	Woman in Tenement	
1909	The Girls and Daddy	Dr. Payson's First Daughter	
1909	The Brahma Diamond	The Guard's Sweetheart	Lost film
1909	A Wreath in Time	Mrs. John Goodhusband	
1909	Tragic Love	The Maid / In Factory	Lost film
1909	The Curtain Pole	Mrs. Edwards	
1909	His Ward's Love	The Reverend's Ward	Lost film
1909	The Joneses Have Amateur Theatricals	Mrs. Jones	
1909	The Politician's Love Story		
1909	The Golden Louis		
1909	At the Altar	Girl at Wedding	
1909	Saul and David		Lost film
1909	The Prussian Spy	The Maid	Lost film
1909	His Wife's Mother	Mrs. Jones	Lost film
1909	A Fool's Revenge		Lost film
1909	The Wooden Leg	Claire	Lost film
1909	The Roue's Heart	Noblewoman	Lost film
1909	The Salvation Army Lass	Mary Wilson	
1909	The Lure of the Gown	Veronica	
1909	I Did It		Lost film
1909	The Deception	Mabel Colton	Lost film
1909	And a Little Child Shall Lead Them		
1909	The Medicine Bottle	Mrs. Ross	
1909	Jones and His New Neighbors	Mrs. Jones	
1909	A Drunkard's Reformation	Woman In the Play	
1909	Trying to Get Arrested	The Nanny	
1909	The Road to the Heart	Miguel's daughter	
1909	Schneider's Anti-Noise Crusade	Mrs. Schneider	
1909	The Winning Coat	Lady-in-Waiting	Lost film
1909	A Sound Sleeper	Second Woman	Lost film
1909	Confidence	Nellie Burton	
1909	Lady Helen's Escapade	Lady Helen	
1909	A Troublesome Satchel	In Crowd	Lost film
1909	The Drive for Life	Mignon	Lost film
1909	Lucky Jim	Wedding Guest	
1909	Tis an Ill Wind that Blows No Good	Mary Flinn	
1909	The Eavesdropper		Lost film
1909	The Note in the Shoe	Ella Berling	Lost film
1909	One Busy Hour	Customer	Lost film
1909	The French Duel	Nurse	Lost film
1909	Jones and the Lady Book Agent	Mrs. Jones	
1909	A Baby's Shoe	The Poor Mother	
1909	The Jilt	Mary Allison – Frank's Sister	Lost film
1909	Resurrection	Katucha	
1909	The Judgment of Solomon		Lost film
1909	Two Memories	Party Guest	Lost film
1909	Eloping with Auntie	Margie	Lost film
1909	What Drink Did	Mrs. Alfred Lucas	
1909	Eradicating Aunty	Flora – Aunty's Ward	Lost film
1909	The Lonely Villa		Lost film
1909	Her First Biscuits	Mrs. Jones	
1909	The Peachbasket Hat	Mrs. Jones	
1909	The Way of Man	Mabel Jarrett	
1909	The Necklace		
1909	The Country Doctor	Mrs. Harcourt	
1909	The Cardinal's Conspiracy	Princess Angela	
1909	Tender Hearts	Minor role	
1909	Sweet and Twenty	Alice's Sister	
1909	Jealousy and the Man	Mrs. Jim Brooks	Lost film
1909	The Slave	Nerada	
1909	The Mended Lute	Rising Moon	
1909	Mr. Jones' Burglar	Mrs. Jones	
1909	Mrs. Jones' Lover	Mrs. Jones	Lost film
1909	The Hessian Renegades		
1909	Lines of White on a Sullen Sea		
1909	Love's Stratagem	The Girl	Lost film
1909	Nursing a Viper		
1909	The Forest Ranger's Daughter	The Forest Ranger's Daughter	Lost film
1909	Her Generous Way		Lost film
1909	Lest We Forget		Lost film
1909	The Awakening of Bess	Bess	Lost film
1909	Mrs. Jones Entertains	Mrs. Jones	Lost film
1909	The Awakening		Lost film
1910	The Right of Love		Lost film
1910	The Tide of Fortune		Lost film
1910	Never Again	Mrs. Henpecker, Temperance Crusader	Lost film
1910	The Coquette's Suitors		Lost film
1910	Justice in the Far North		Lost film
1910	The Blind Man's Tact		Lost film
1910	Jane and the Stranger	Jane	Lost film
1910	The Governor's Pardon		Lost film
1910	The New Minister		Lost film
1910	Mother Love	The Mother	Lost film
1910	The Broken Oath		Lost film
1910	The Time-Lock Safe	The Mother	
1910	His Sick Friend	The Wife	Lost film
1910	The Stage Note		Lost film
1910	Transfusion		Lost film
1910	The Miser's Daughter	The Miser's Daughter	Lost film
1910	His Second Wife		Lost film
1910	The Rosary		Lost film
1910	The Maelstrom		
1910	The New Shawl	Marie	Lost film
1910	Two Men	The Orphan	Lost film
1910	The Doctor's Perfidy		Lost film
1910	The Eternal Triangle	The Wife	Lost film
1910	The Nichols on Vacation	Mrs. Nichols	Lost film
1910	A Reno Romance	Grace	Lost film
1910	A Discontented Woman		Lost film
1910	A Self-Made Hero	The Girl	Lost film
1910	A Game for Two	Mrs. Henderson	Lost film
1910	The Call of the Circus		Lost film
1910	Old Heads and Young Hearts		Lost film
1910	Bear Ye One Another's Burden	Mrs. George Rand	Lost film
1910	The Irony of Fate		Lost film
1910	Once Upon a Time		Lost film
1910	Among the Roses	The Rose Girl	Lost film
1910	The Senator's Double		Lost film
1910	The Taming of Jane	Jane	Lost film
1910	The Widow	The Widow	Lost film
1910	The Right Girl		Lost film
1910	Debt		Lost film
1910	Pressed Roses		Lost film
1910	All the World's a Stage		Lost film
1910	The Count of Montebello	The Heiress	Lost film
1910	The Call		Lost film
1910	The Mistake		Lost film
1911	His Bogus Uncle	The Object of Their Affection	Lost film
1911	Age Versus Youth	Nora Blake	Lost film
1911	A Show Girl's Stratagem	Ethel Lane	Lost film
1911	The Test	Miss Gillman	Lost film
1911	Nan's Diplomacy	Nan	Lost film
1911	Vanity and Its Cure	Effie Hart	Lost film
1911	His Friend, the Burglar	Mrs. Tom Dayton – The Wife	Lost film
1911	The Actress and the Singer	The Actress	Lost film
1911	Her Artistic Temperament	Flo	Lost film
1911	Her Child's Honor	The Mother	Lost film
1911	The Wife's Awakening	The Wife	Lost film
1911	Opportunity and the Man	Flora Hamilton	Lost film
1911	The Two Fathers	Gladys	Lost film
1911	The Hoyden	Gladys Weston	Lost film
1911	The Sheriff and the Man		Lost film
1911	A Fascinating Bachelor	The Nurse	Lost film
1911	That Awful Brother	Florence	Lost film
1911	Her Humble Ministry	The Reformed Woman	Lost film
1911	A Good Turn		Lost film
1911	The State Line	The Sheriff's Daughter	Lost film
1911	A Game of Deception	The Actress	Lost film
1911	The Professor's Ward	Edith – The Professor's Ward	Lost film
1911	Duke De Ribbon Counter	Lillian De Mille	Lost film
1911	Higgenses Versus Judsons	Freda Judson	Lost film
1911	The Little Rebel	Rosalind Trevaine	Lost film
1911	Always a Way	Ruth Craven	Lost film
1911	The Snare of Society	Mary Williams	Lost film
1911	During Cherry Time	Violet – the Country Girl	Lost film
1911	The Gypsy	Zara – the Gypsy	Lost film
1911	Her Two Sons	The Younger Brother's Wife	Lost film
1911	Through Jealous Eyes	Flo – the Doctor's Office Nurse	Lost film
1911	A Rebellious Blossom	Flo = the Rebellious Daughter	Lost film
1911	The Secret	Diana Stanhope	Lost film
1911	Romance of Pond Cove	Florence Earle	Lost film
1911	The Story of Rosie's Rose	Rosie Carter	Lost film
1911	The Life Saver	Jessie Storm – the Local Girl	Lost film
1911	The Matchmaker	Evelyn Bruce – the Young Governess	Lost film
1911	The Slavey's Affinity	Peggy – a Boarding House Drudge	Lost film
1911	The Maniac	Dora Elsmore	Lost film
1911	A Rural Conqueror	Marjorie Thorne	Lost film
1911	One on Reno	Mrs. Appleby	Lost film
1911	Aunt Jane's Legacy	Bessie Elkins – the Niece	Lost film
1911	His Chorus Girl Wife	Sybil Sanford – a Chorus Girl	Lost film
1911	A Blind Deception	Ellen Austin – the Nurse	Lost film
1911	A Head for Business	Phyllis Moore	Lost film
1911	A Girlish Impulse	Gladys Stevens	Lost film
1911	Art Versus Music	Ethel Vernon	Lost film
1911	The American Girl		Lost film
1912	A Village Romance	Flo – the Country Girl	Lost film
1912	The Players	Flo Lakewood	Lost film
1912	Not Like Other Girls	Flo	Lost film
1912	Taking a Chance	Mrs. Flo Mills	Lost film
1912	The Mill Buyers	Flo	Lost film
1912	The Chance Shot	Flo	Lost film
1912	Her Cousin Fred	Flo Ballard	Lost film
1912	The Winning Punch	Nellie Wilson	Lost film
1912	After All	Margie	Lost film
1912	All for Love	Flo	Lost film
1912	Flo's Discipline	Florence Dow	
1912	The Advent of Jane	Dr. Jane Bixby	Lost film
1912	Tangled Relations	Florence the Governess	Lost film
1912	Betty's Nightmare	Betty	Lost film
1912	The Cross-Roads	Annabel Spaulding	
1912	The Angel of the Studio	Roxie	Lost film
1912	The Redemption of Riverton	June Martin	Lost film
1912	Sisters	Annie / Mary (twin sisters)	Lost film
1912	The Lady Leone	Lady Leone Mervyn	Lost film
1912	A Surgeon's Heroism		Lost film
1913	The Closed Door	Florence Ashleigh	Lost film
1913	The Girl o'the Woods	Mab Hawkins	Lost film
1913	The Spender	Flo	Lost film
1913	His Wife's Child	Flo	Lost film
1913	Unto the Third Generation	Esther Stern	Lost film
1913	The Influence of Sympathy	The Wife	Lost film
1913	A Girl and Her Money	Florence Kingsley	Lost film
1913	Suffragette's Parade in Washington		Lost film
1913	The Counterfeiter		
1914	The Coryphee	Florence	Lost film
1914	The Romance of a Photograph	Flo	Lost film
1914	The False Bride	Florence Gould & Amy St. Clair (Dual Role)	Lost film
1914	The Law's Decree	Flo	Lost film
1914	The Stepmother	Flo	Lost film
1914	The Honeymooners	Florence Blair	Lost film
1914	Diplomatic Flo	Flo	Lost film
1914	The Little Mail Carrier	Flo – the Little Mail Carrier	Lost film
1914	The Pawns of Destiny	Flo	Lost film
1914	The Bribe		Lost film
1914	A Disenchantment	Flo – the Maid	Lost film
1914	The Doctor's Testimony	Florence Lund	Lost film
1914	A Singular Cynic	Flo Welton	Lost film
1914	Her Ragged Knight	Flo – Bob's Ward	Lost film
1914	The Mad Man's Ward		Lost film
1914	The Honor of the Humble	Flo Soule – The Gamekeeper's Daughter	Lost film
1914	Counterfeiters	Flo	Lost film
1914	A Mysterious Mystery	Miss Lawrence	Lost film
1914	The Woman Who Won	Florence Lloyd	Lost film
1914	The Great Universal Mystery	Herself	Lost film
1917	Face on the Screen		Lost film
1918	The Love Craze		Lost film

=== Features ===
Year	Title	Role	Notes
1908	The Red Girl	The Red Girl	Lost film
1914	A Singular Sinner		Lost film
1916	Elusive Isabel	Isabel Thorne	Lost film
1922	The Unfoldment	Katherine Nevin	Lost film
1923	The Satin Girl	Sylvia	Lost film
1923	Lucretia Lombard		
1924	Gambling Wives	Polly Barker	Lost film
1926	The Johnstown Flood	Townswoman	Uncredited
1926	The Greater Glory	Woman	Uncredited; Lost film
1930	Sweeping Against the Winds		
1931	Homicide Squad		
1931	Pleasure	Martha	
1931	The Hard Hombre	The Sister	Uncredited
1932	So Big	Mina	Uncredited
1932	Sinners in the Sun	Minor role	Uncredited
1933	Secrets	Minor role	Uncredited
1933	The Silk Express	Minor role	Uncredited
1934	The Old Fashioned Way	Minor role	Uncredited
1935	Man on the Flying Trapeze	Minor role	Uncredited
1935	The Crusades	Minor role	Uncredited
1936	Yellow Dust	Minor role	Uncredited
1936	One Rainy Afternoon	Minor role	Uncredited
1936	Hollywood Boulevard	Minor role	Scenes deleted
1937	Night Must Fall	Minor role	Uncredited

== See also ==
- Canadian pioneers in early Hollywood

== Bibliography ==
- Bailey, Thomas Melville (1992). Dictionary of Hamilton Biography. Vol. III, 1925–1939. W.L. Griffin Ltd. pp. 106–108.
- Brown, Kelly R. (1999). Florence Lawrence, the Biograph Girl: America's First Movie Star. McFarland. ISBN 0-786-43089-3.
