= The Unfoldment =

1922 film

- Directed by: George Kern ?Murdock MacQuarrie
- Written by: James Couldwell(story); Reed Heustis(story)
- Produced by: Producers Pictures
- Starring: Florence Lawrence
- Cinematography: Edward Gheller; Hal Mohr
- Distributed by: Associated Exhibitors
- Release date: January 1, 1922
- Running time: 6 reels
- Country: USA
- Language: Silent..English titles

The Unfoldment is a lost 1922 silent film feature directed by George Kern and starring Florence Lawrence. It was produced by an independent company.

Only a fragment of this film survives in the Library of Congress collection.

== Cast ==
- Florence Lawrence - Katherine Nevin
- Barbara Bedford - Martha Osborne
- Charles K. French - James Osborne
- William Conklin - Charles MacLaughlin
- Albert Prisco - Angus
- Lydia Knott - Mrs. MacLaughlin
- Raymond Cannon - Jack Nevin
- Murdock MacQuarrie - Mayor of Avenue A
- Wade Boteler - Ted Packham
- R. L. Frost - Christ .. (*note:possibly poet Robert Frost)
