= One Touch of Nature (1909 film) =

1909 film directed by D. W. Griffith

- Directed by: D. W. Griffith
- Written by: Stanner E.V. Taylor
- Starring: Arthur V. Johnson
- Cinematography: Arthur Marvin
- Release date: January 1, 1909
- Running time: 10 minutes (one reel)
- Country: United States
- Language: Silent

One Touch of Nature is a 1909 American silent short drama film directed by D. W. Griffith. It is not known whether the film currently survives, which suggests that it is a lost film.

== Cast ==
- Arthur V. Johnson as John Murray
- Florence Lawrence as Mrs. John Murray
- Marion Leonard as Sicilian Woman
- Charles Inslee as Sicilian Woman's Accomplice
- Harry Solter as Doctor
- Linda Arvidson as Nurse
- Kate Bruce
- Adele DeGarde
- Gladys Egan
- George Gebhardt as Man at Stage Door
- Jeanie MacPherson
- Gertrude Robinson
- Mack Sennett
- Dorothy West
