= The Red Girl =

1908 film directed by D. W. Griffith

- Directed by: D. W. Griffith
- Written by: D. W. Griffith; Stanner E.V. Taylor
- Produced by: American Mutoscope & Biograph Company
- Starring: Florence Lawrence
- Cinematography: Arthur Marvin
- Distributed by: American Mutoscope & Biograph
- Release date: September 15, 1908
- Running time: 17 minutes (one reel)
- Country: United States
- Languages: Silent; English intertitles

The Red Girl is a 1908 American black-and-white short silent Western film directed by D. W. Griffith for the American Mutoscope & Biograph Company. It stars Florence Lawrence and the cast includes Charles Inslee, George Gebhardt, D. W. Griffith, Mack Sennett and Linda Arvidson.

== Plot ==
An Indian girl helps a Mexican woman who has stolen a bag of gold nuggets belonging to a girl miner. The Mexican woman seduces the Indian girl's husband and tortures her. She escapes and meets the posse looking for the thief. Her husband and the woman are escaping downstream in a canoe so the posse launch other canoes and give chase. A fight ensues with the canoes capsizing and the Mexican woman taken prisoner. The Indian girl's husband pleads with her to forgive him but she refuses and goes away with the girl miner.

== Cast ==
- Florence Lawrence as The Red Girl
- Charles Inslee as The Red Girl's Husband

=== Others (not all confirmed) ===
- Linda Arvidson as Woman in Second Bar
- Clara T. Bracy
- George Gebhardt as Indian / Man in First Bar / Man in Second Bar
- D. W. Griffith as Man on Footpath
- Arthur V. Johnson
- Anthony O'Sullivan
- Mack Sennett as Man in First Bar / Man in Second Bar
- Harry Solter as Bartender
- Marion Sunshine
