= Betrayed by a Handprint =

1908 film directed by D. W. Griffith

- Play film; runtime 00:10:43.
- Directed by: D. W. Griffith
- Written by: D. W. Griffith
- Starring: Florence Lawrence
- Cinematography: G. W. Bitzer; Arthur Marvin
- Release date: September 1, 1908
- Running time: 13 minutes (1 reel, original release length 833 feet)
- Country: United States
- Language: Silent

Betrayed by a Handprint is a 1908 American silent short crime film directed by D. W. Griffith. A print of the film exists.

== Cast ==
- Florence Lawrence as Myrtle Vane
- Harry Solter as Mr. Wharton
- Linda Arvidson as The Maid / Party Guest
- Kate Bruce as Mrs. Wharton (unconfirmed)
- Gene Gauntier as Party Guest
- George Gebhardt as The Palmister
- Mack Sennett as The Butler
