= The Clubman and the Tramp =

1908 American silent short comedy film

- Directed by: D. W. Griffith
- Written by: D. W. Griffith
- Starring: Florence Lawrence
- Cinematography: G. W. Bitzer
- Release date: November 27, 1908
- Running time: 17 minutes (one reel)
- Country: United States
- Language: Silent

The Clubman and the Tramp is a 1908 American silent short comedy film directed by D. W. Griffith.

== Cast ==
- Florence Lawrence as Bridget / Dinner Guest
- Linda Arvidson as Dinner Guest
- John R. Cumpson
- George Gebhardt as Waiter
- Robert Harron as Man on Street
- Arthur V. Johnson as Dinner Guest / Moneylender
- Jeanie MacPherson as Dinner Guest
- Mack Sennett as Dinner Guest / Policeman
- Harry Solter as Man on Street
