= The Girl and the Outlaw =

1908 film directed by D. W. Griffith

- Directed by: D. W. Griffith
- Written by: D. W. Griffith
- Produced by: American Mutoscope & Biograph Company
- Starring: Charles Inslee
- Cinematography: Arthur Marvin
- Distributed by: American Mutoscope & Biograph
- Release date: September 8, 1908
- Running time: 14 minutes (one reel)
- Country: United States
- Languages: Silent; English intertitles

The Girl and the Outlaw is a 1908 American short silent Western film directed by D. W. Griffith for American Mutoscope & Biograph Company. It starred Charles Inslee as the outlaw but other members of the cast are largely unconfirmed. Florence Lawrence and Mack Sennett made early appearances.

== Plot ==
A girl called Nellie falls for Preston, a notorious outlaw who leads a band of Native American renegades. Preston treats her badly and leaves her for dead but she is rescued by a mountain woman whom she had befriended. They escape together, sharing a horse, but Nellie is mortally wounded. As Preston tries to overtake them, the mountain woman stabs him in the chest and he is killed. The renegades stop and then ride away. Nellie dies soon after reaching her father's cabin.

== Cast ==
- Charles Inslee as Bill Preston, the outlaw
- Gene Gauntier as Nellie Carson (unconfirmed)
- Harry Solter as Nellie's father

=== Others (unconfirmed) ===
- George Gebhardt
- Arthur V. Johnson
- Florence Lawrence
- Wilfred Lucas
- Mack Sennett
- Dorothy West
