= The Heart of O'Yama =

1908 film directed by D. W. Griffith

- Directed by: D. W. Griffith
- Written by: D. W. Griffith; Bret Harte
- Starring: Florence Lawrence
- Cinematography: Arthur Marvin
- Release date: September 18, 1908
- Running time: 15 minutes (one reel)
- Country: United States
- Language: Silent

The Heart of O'Yama is a 1908 American silent short drama film directed by D. W. Griffith. It is based on the play La Tosca by Victorien Sardou.

== Cast ==
- Florence Lawrence as O'Yama
- George Gebhardt as O'Yama's Lover
- D. W. Griffith as Footman
- George Nichols as Grand Daimio (unconfirmed)
- Mack Sennett as Footman
- Harry Solter as Spy
