= Her Humble Ministry =

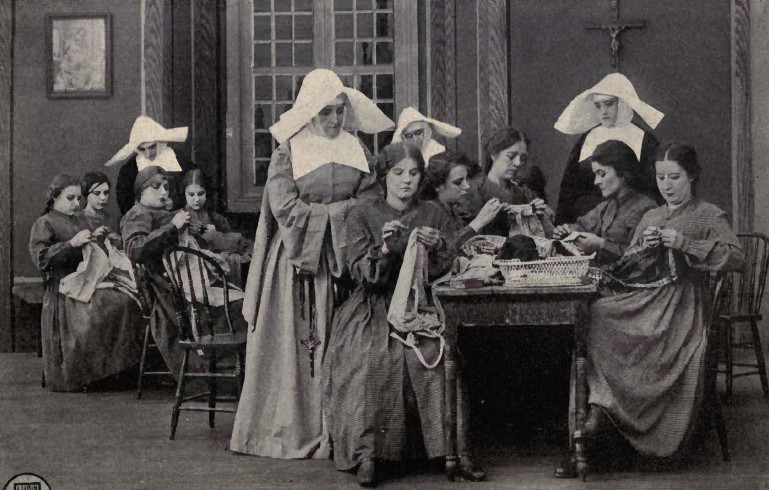
- Still captured in David S. Hulfish's Cyclopedia of Motion-Picture Work
- Directed by: Harry Solter
- Produced by: Siegmund Lubin
- Starring: Florence Lawrence; Spottiswoode Aitken; Ethel Elder; Arthur V. Johnson; Albert McGovern
- Production company: Lubin Manufacturing Company
- Release date: May 18, 1911
- Running time: 1,000 feet
- Country: United States

Her Humble Ministry is a 1911 silent, short drama film directed by Harry Solter for the Lubin Manufacturing Company. The film follows a young woman (Florence Lawrence), who lives in the slums with her corrupt parents. She is taken from the custody of her parents into a reform school, where a group of nuns successfully rehabilitate her. She is eventually able to reform a duo of former convicts the same, one of whom (Arthur V. Johnson) wins her love.

Lawrence and Johnson, usually cast as quarreling lovers, star in this romantic drama film in which Lawrence's character becomes an authority. This character has been cited as a deviation for Lawrence's roles in Lublin productions. The film was released on May 18, 1911, to positive critical reception. It is now likely lost.

== Plot ==
Living in a slum, a young woman is sent to a reform school when her corrupt parents are deemed unfit. The nuns who operate the school are eventually able to reintegrate the woman into society. She later comes across two former convicts, one of whom has served time for petty thievery. The woman successfully rehabilitates both, just as she has been. Meanwhile, she falls in love with one of the thieves; an advertisement in the New York Dramatic Mirror describes that character as a "past master in porch-climbing, safe-blowing and highway robbery", who secures a job thanks to the woman.

== Production ==
Her Humble Ministry is a production of the Lubin Manufacturing Company, owned by Lubin. On its completion, the film was roughly 1,000 feet in length. It starred Florence Lawrence as the leading character. Her parents were portrayed by Spottiswoode Aitken and Ethel Elder. Arthur V. Johnson and Albert McGovern were cast as the former convicts; in the film, Johnson's character falls in love with Lawrence's.

The film was directed by Harry Solter, at the time Lawrence's spouse. Lawrence, who joined the Philadelphia film studio in early 1911, was still contractually signed to Lubin in the months following the film's release. In Lubin productions, Lawrence and Johnson were often mutually typecast as an unlikely romantic duo set to marry or as an already wedded couple whose relationship is threatened over trivial matters. The film historian Kelly R. Brown called Her Humble Ministry a slight departure from Lawrence's usual roles, as an arbiter to Johnson.

Her Humble Ministry was released on May 18, 1911. The film screened at the Majestic Theatre in Victoria, British Columbia, on July 13 of the same year; and at the nearby Crystal Theatre almost a year later, on June 12. Editors of the British Columbian Daily Colonist described the film as a "touching love story". A writer of the East Oregonian observed a religious motif, calling it "one of the most wisely conducted films" ever produced with such a theme. The screenwriter Monte M. Katterjohn denounced the lack of further screenings of Lubin's filmography, including Her Humble Ministry, in a 1914 Photoplay article. Seeing these productions as better produced than the perceived flood of slapstick and burlesque comedies, Katterjohn called Her Humble Ministry, among Lubin's other films, a "charming wor[k] of yesteryear".

The film is presumed lost, as are most Lubin films starring Lawrence. Released in the same year as Her Humble Ministry, The Two Fathers is an exception; a complete copy was extant in the BFI National Archive in 1999.

== Citations ==
- Brown, Kelly R. (1999). Florence Lawrence, the Biograph Girl: America's First Movie Star. McFarland & Company. ISBN 9780786406272.
- Lawrence, Florence; Katterjohn, Monte M. (November 1914). "Growing Up with the Movies". Photoplay. VI (6). Cloud Publishing Company: 28–41.
- Rabkin, Leslie Y. (1998). The Celluloid Couch: An Annotated International Filmography of the Mental Health Professional in the Movies and Television, from the Beginning to 1990. Scarecrow Press. ISBN 9780810834620.
