= Resurrection (1909 film) =

- PLAY partial copy of film; runtime 00:12:11.
- Directed by: D. W. Griffith
- Written by: Leo Tolstoy; Frank E. Woods
- Produced by: Biograph Company
- Starring: Florence Lawrence
- Cinematography: G.W. Bitzer; Arthur Marvin
- Distributed by: Biograph Company
- Release date: May 20, 1909
- Running time: Original length 15-16 minutes (1 reel, 999 feet)
- Country: United States
- Languages: Silent; English title card

Resurrection is a 1909 American silent short film made by the Biograph Company. It is based on Leo Tolstoy's 1899 novel Resurrection. Adapted for the screen by Frank E. Woods, it was directed by D. W. Griffith and stars several pioneering legends of American cinema such as Arthur V. Johnson, Florence Lawrence, Marion Leonard, Owen Moore, Mack Sennett, and Linda Arvidson, who was Griffith's first wife.

== Cast ==
- Arthur V. Johnson - Prince Dmitri
- Florence Lawrence - Katusha
- Marion Leonard - A Prisoner
- Owen Moore - At Court/At Prison
- Mack Sennett - At Court/A Guard/At Inn
- Clara T. Bracy -
- Charles Avery

== Plot ==
The subject opens with the return home of Prince Dimitri. who meets the maid Katusha. a little peasant girl, and is instantly charmed with her beauty. Young, artless and innocent, as pretty as a rose, she unwittingly fascinates the prince. His noble bearing likewise impresses her, and his little attentions flatter her, until at length she is unable to resist his advances. The poor girl is meted the usual fate. An alliance is out of the question. The disparity of their ranks even forbids it. and soon the prince must cast her aside.

Five years later we find that the girl, who is now a loathsome sight, has learned the bitter lesson of the eternal truth, "The wages of sin is death." It is death to the soul at all events. She has gone down to the lowest depths and is arrested in a low Russian tavern. As she is carried to the tribunal she passes Prince Dimitri, who now sees the terrible result of his sins. He grows repentant and attempts to plead her cause before the jury, but they are a callous lot and pay no attention to the arguments for nor against, and by force of habit vote to send her to Siberia. She is dragged out to the pen of detention and herded with a lot of poor unfortunates, who scarcely bear any resemblance to human beings.

The repentant prince determines to give up his life to right the wrong he has done, and visits her here with a view of turning her now vicious nature, handing her a copy of the Bible. She does not recognize him at first, but when she does she flies into fury, beating his body and face with her fists and the book. He leaves her and she sits moodily on the bench with the book on her lap. Shortly she turns its pages and her eyes fall on the passage (John 11:25), "And Jesus said unto her. I am the resurrection and the life: he that believeth in me, though he were dead yet shall be live." In an instant her whole being changes. There is hope for her salvation, and she reads on. The guards arrive and we next see her with the poor unfortunates trudging over the snow-clad steppes toward the goal from whence few return. She becomes the ministering angel, sharing her comforts with them. The prince, meanwhile, has secured her pardon and hastens after her. Giving her the welcome notice, he begs her to return with him as his wife. However, she prefers to work out her salvation helping those poor souls to whom a kindness is an indescribable blessing, and bidding him farewell, she renounces the world for the path of duty, so we leave her kneeling on the snow at the foot of the Holy Cross.
