= Biograph girl =

Pseudonym for Mary Pickford and Florence Lawrence

Biograph Girl was a phrase associated with two early-20th-century actresses, Florence Lawrence and Mary Pickford, who made black-and-white silent films with the Biograph Company. At that time, all studios refused to give actors on-screen film credit; they did not want them to gain public celebrity status and command higher salaries. This had already happened with stage actors, and the studios did not want to repeat the trend on film.

Because the actors were mainly anonymous, the public and news media began to call the popular actress Florence Lawrence the "Biograph girl". In 1910, Lawrence was lured away from Biograph by Carl Laemmle when he started his new Independent Motion Picture Company, known as IMP (he later founded Universal Studios in 1913). Laemmle wanted Lawrence to be his star attraction so he offered her more money ($250 a week) and marquee billing—something Biograph did not allow at the time. She signed on with him; Laemmle had rumors of her death circulated in the press and later took out advertisements criticizing the same rumors. This publicity, timed with the release of her first IMP film The Broken Oath (1910), made her a household name. She quickly became the first film star with celebrity status, and the second person to receive billing on the credits of her film (after Max Linder). From then on, other actors slowly began to receive billing credit on film.

After Lawrence left Biograph, Mary Pickford began gaining in popularity with the studio and was soon nicknamed the new "Biograph Girl" until she, too, received billing credits in her films.

Coincidentally, both Lawrence and Pickford were both originally from Ontario, Canada; Pickford was from Toronto, and Lawrence from Hamilton. As well, both were raised by their mothers, as their fathers died within a week of each other (in unrelated accidents) in February 1898.
