= George Gebhardt =

American actor (1879–1919)

- Born: September 21, 1879; Basel, Switzerland
- Died: May 2, 1919 (aged 39); Edendale, Los Angeles, U.S.
- Occupation: Actor
- Years active: 1908—1918

George Gebhardt (September 21, 1879 – May 2, 1919) was an American silent film actor. He appeared in more than 120 films between 1908 and 1922. He was born in Basel, Switzerland and died in Edendale, Los Angeles from tuberculosis.

== Selected filmography ==
- Balked at the Altar (1908)
- After Many Years (1908)
- The Fight for Freedom (1908)
- Romance of a Jewess (1908)
- The Taming of the Shrew (1908)
- Money Mad (1908)
- A Calamitous Elopement (1908)
- The Greaser's Gauntlet (1908)
- The Man and the Woman (1908)
- The Fatal Hour (1908)
- For Love of Gold (1908)
- The Call of the Wild (1908)
- For a Wife's Honor (1908)
- Betrayed by a Handprint (1908)
- Monday Morning in a Coney Island Police Court (1908)
- The Girl and the Outlaw (1908)
- Behind the Scenes (1908)
- The Red Girl (1908)
- The Heart of O'Yama (1908)
- Where the Breakers Roar (1908)
- A Smoked Husband (1908)
- The Stolen Jewels (1908)
- The Devil (1908)
- The Zulu's Heart (1908)
- Father Gets in the Game (1908)
- Ingomar, the Barbarian (1908)
- The Vaquero's Vow (1908)
- The Planter's Wife (1908)
- Concealing a Burglar (1908)
- The Pirate's Gold (1908)
- The Guerrilla (1908)
- The Song of the Shirt (1908)
- The Ingrate (1908)
- A Woman's Way (1908)
- The Clubman and the Tramp (1908)
- The Valet's Wife (1908)
- The Feud and the Turkey (1908)
- The Reckoning (1908)
- The Test of Friendship (1908)
- An Awful Moment (1908)
- The Christmas Burglars (1908)
- Mr. Jones at the Ball (1908)
- The Helping Hand (1908)
- The Kentuckian (1908)
- One Touch of Nature (1909)
- The Maniac Cook (1909)
- The Honor of Thieves (1909)
- Love Finds a Way (1909)
- The Sacrifice (1909)
- A Rural Elopement (1909)
- The Criminal Hypnotist (1909)
- The Fascinating Mrs. Francis (1909)
- Those Awful Hats (1909)
- The Welcome Burglar (1909)
- The Cord of Life (1909)
- The Brahma Diamond (1909)
- A Wreath in Time (1909)
- Tragic Love (1909)
- The Curtain Pole (1909)
- The Golden Louis (1909)
- At the Altar (1909)
- Jones and the Lady Book Agent (1909)
- The Politician's Love Story (1909)
- The Dishonored Medal (1914)
- The Secret of the Submarine (1915)
- The Fighting Hope (1915)
- The Voice in the Fog (1915)
- Blackbirds (1915)
- The Unknown (1915)
- Hands Up! (1918)
- Madame Spy (1918)
- Through Eyes of Men (1920)
