= Daniel Boone (1907 film) =

1907 American silent film

Daniel Boone; or, Pioneer Days in America is a 1907 American silent film directed by Wallace McCutcheon and Edwin S. Porter for the Edison Manufacturing Company. It starred Florence Lawrence, often called "the first movie star."

== Plot ==
Famed American pioneer and frontiersman Daniel Boone's daughter befriends an Indian maiden as Boone and his companion start out on a hunting expedition. While he is away, Boone's cabin is attacked by the Indians, who set it on fire and abduct Boone's daughter. Boone returns, swears vengeance, then heads out on the trail to the Indian camp. His daughter escapes but is chased. The Indians encounter Boone, which sets off a huge fight on the edge of a cliff. A burning arrow gets shot into the Indian camp. Boone gets tied to the stake and tortured. The burning arrow sets the Indian camp on fire, causing panic. Boone is rescued by his horse, and Boone has a knife fight in which he kills the Indian chief.

== Cast ==
- William Craven as Daniel Boone
- Florence Lawrence as Boone's daughter
- Susanne Willis
- Mrs. William Craven

== Production and release ==
Film historian Charles Musser writes that the production was haphazardly shot in Bronx Park as weather and talent schedules permitted. Florence Lawrence kept notes of her first experiences in the film, which show that Porter did not delegate much of the work, which led to a slow shooting schedule. Porter created a fire effect in the film by hand-painting portions of the negative.
