= The Stolen Jewels (1908 film) =

1908 film directed by D. W. Griffith

- Directed by: D. W. Griffith
- Written by: D. W. Griffith
- Starring: Harry Solter
- Cinematography: G. W. Bitzer
- Release date: September 29, 1908
- Running time: 11 minutes (one reel)
- Country: United States
- Language: Silent

The Stolen Jewels is a 1908 American silent short drama film directed by D. W. Griffith.

== Cast ==
- Harry Solter as Mr. Jenkins
- Florence Lawrence as Mrs. Jenkins
- Linda Arvidson as The Nurse
- John R. Cumpson as Smithson / Man at Broker's
- Gladys Egan as Child
- George Gebhardt as The Detective / The Mover
- D. W. Griffith as Crowd Member at Exchange
- Charles Inslee as Man at Brokers
