= Victor Studios =

The Victor Film Company was a motion picture company formed in 1912 by movie star Florence Lawrence and her husband, Harry Solter. The company established Victor Studios in Fort Lee, New Jersey, when early film studios in America's first motion picture industry were based there at the beginning of the 20th century.

At a time when actors received no screen credits, Carl Laemmle of the Independent Moving Pictures Company (IMP) had begun promoting Lawrence's name and image, making her into America's "First Movie Star."

Harry Solter had already been directing Lawrence at IMP and with their own studio, he made a large number of film shorts starring his wife, many of which co-starred Owen Moore and King Baggot. In addition, the studio teamed Moore with Fritzi Brunette in several of its productions. However, with the amalgamation of several studios to create the colossal Universal Film Manufacturing Company, Lawrence and Solter had little choice but to sell out in 1913. With Solter no longer involved, Universal brought in young directors such as Allan Dwan and James Kirkwood, Sr. The Victor entity remained in use until 1917 when it was absorbed completely into Universal.
