= The Broken Oath =

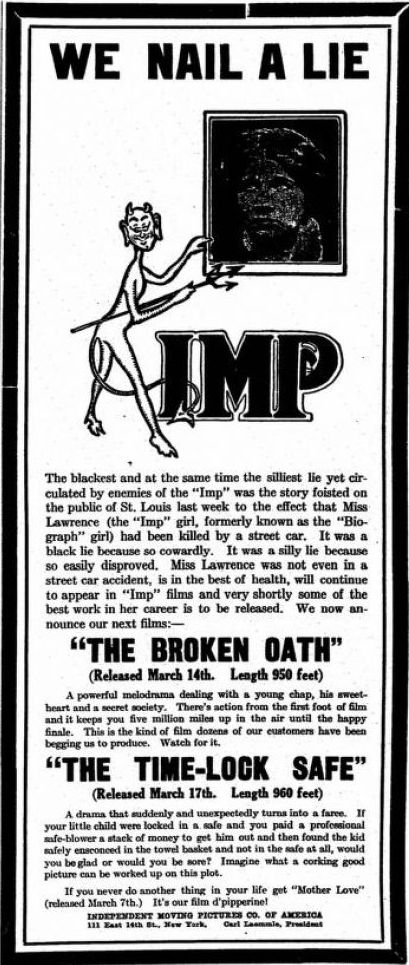
- Advertisement in Billboard (1910)
- Directed by: Harry Solter
- Produced by: Carl Laemmle
- Starring: Florence Lawrence
- Production company: IMP
- Release date: 1910
- Running time: 18 minutes
- Country: United States
- Language: English

The Broken Oath is a 1910 silent short film starring Florence Lawrence, directed by Harry Solter, and produced by Carl Laemmle. It was the first film to marquee the name of an actor, Lawrence, to promote a film.

Laemmle arranged elaborate publicity for the film, planting a fake news story in newspapers that Lawrence had been killed in a street-car accident. When this was widely picked up by other publications, he published advertisements saying that the original story was a lie and that she was starring in a new film to be released shortly (although some ads misspelled the film title as The Broken Bath).
