= George Kern =

American lawyer

George Calvin Kern Jr.
- Born: April 19, 1926; Baltimore, Maryland
- Died: November 27, 2012 (aged 86); New York City
- Education: Princeton University (A.B.); Yale Law School (LL.B.)
- Occupation: Corporate lawyer
- Employer: Sullivan & Cromwell

George Calvin Kern Jr. (April 19, 1926 – November 27, 2012), a native of Baltimore, Maryland, was a leading New York corporate lawyer in the 1970s and 1980s.

== Biography ==
Kern graduated with an A.B. from the School of Public and International Affairs (now Woodrow Wilson School of Public and International Affairs) from Princeton University in 1947 after completing a senior thesis titled "War Beyond the Law - The Efforts to Outlaw War from Versailles to Nurnberg." After graduating from Yale Law School in 1952, Kern joined Sullivan & Cromwell where he became a partner in 1960. Kern was widely viewed among the legal professional as a uniquely colorful figure who dabbled in all aspects of corporate law. When the mergers & acquisitions boom started in the 1970s, most established corporate law firms refused this sort of work and left it to upstarts such as Skadden, Arps, Slate, Meagher & Flom and Wachtell, Lipton, Rosen & Katz. Kern, alone among elite Wall Street corporate lawyers, understood that mergers would change the face of corporate America and relished the takeover battles of the day. Kern was widely viewed as one of the early leaders at the M&A bar together with Joseph H. Flom and Martin Lipton. Kern retired from active practice in 1994.
