= Elusive Isabel =

1909 novel by Jacques Futrelle

- First edition
- Author: Jacques Futrelle
- Illustrator: Alonzo Kimball
- Language: English
- Genre: Spy novel
- Publisher: A.L. Burt/Bobbs-Merrill
- Publication date: 1909
- Publication place: United States
- Media type: Print (hardback & paperback)
- Pages: 273 pp (first edition, hardback)

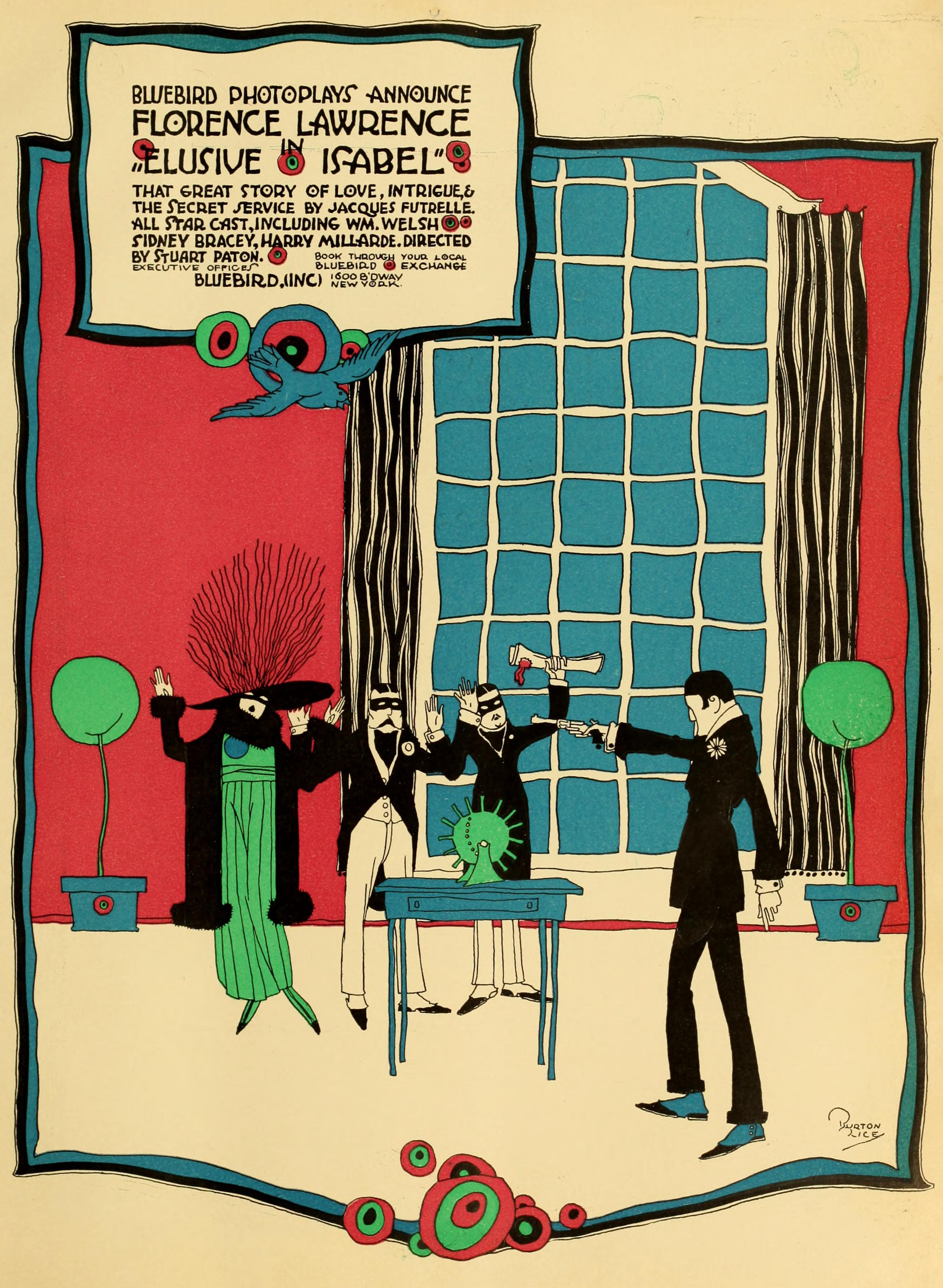
Advertisement for the 1916 film based on the book.

Elusive Isabel is a novel by Jacques Futrelle first published in 1909. Set in Washington, D.C., it is a spy novel about an international conspiracy of the "Latin" countries against the English-speaking world with the aim to take over world control.

== Plot summary ==
The eponymous heroine, Isabel Thorne, is a young woman, half British, half Italian, who works for the Italian Secret Service. She has been commissioned to bring about the signing of a secret contract, in the capital of the enemy, by representatives of all countries involved, both European and American. Her brother, an inventor, has devised a secret weapon by which missiles can be fired from submarines (see also depth charge) which will, it is hoped, secure military domination over the rest of the world.

Members of the U.S. Secret Service, who have been alerted, are assigned to prevent the signing of this "Latin compact" and bring to justice those involved who have no diplomatic immunity. One young representative named Grimm, however, although absolutely loyal to his government, falls in love with the beautiful foreign agent, Thorne.

In the end Thorne, who reciprocates her admirer's love, becomes estranged from her employer, the Italian government, because she does not want Grimm, who has been captured by the conspirators and knows all their secrets, to be murdered. Stripped of all her power and possessions, she unites with him at the end of the novel, no longer elusive.

Elusive Isabel is now in the public domain.

== See also ==
- Henry Adams's Democracy: An American Novel (1880) is another novel set in Washington, D.C. which deals with various machinations big and small in the U.S capital
