= Her First Biscuits =

1909 silent short film

- A scene from the film
- Directed by: D. W. Griffith
- Written by: Frank E. Woods
- Starring: John R. Cumpson; Florence Lawrence
- Cinematography: Billy Bitzer
- Release date: June 17, 1909
- Running time: 7 minutes (514 feet on split reel at release) (Note: A full 1000-foot reel of film in the silent era had, on average, a maximum running time of 15 minutes. Also, silent films were generally projected in the early 1900s at a "standard" speed of 16 frames per second, much slower than the 24 frames of later sound films. A 514-foot film in 1909 would have therefore had a runtime between 7 and 8 minutes.)
- Country: United States
- Language: Silent (English intertitles)

Her First Biscuits is a 1909 American silent short comedy film written by Frank E. Woods, directed by D. W. Griffith, and starring John R. Cumpson and Florence Lawrence. This was future movie megastar Mary Pickford's film debut, as a 16-year-old extra.

== Plot ==
Mrs. Jones makes biscuits for her husband for the first time. He pretends to like them, but he really thinks they are terrible. He leaves for work at his theatrical booking office.

After a short while, the biscuits make Mr. Jones sick; he leaves the office for the adjacent room. While he is away, his wife shows up and leaves a bag of biscuits on his desk. Numerous actors show up, spot the biscuits and eat them (including one played by a teenage Mary Pickford). All of them become ill too, most joining Mr. Jones in the next room. Back in the kitchen, an iceman making a delivery, a policeman and another workman all suffer the same fate. Mr. Jones' secretary is a witness to the biscuits' effects. When she is pestered by an actor, she offers him a biscuit just to get rid of him. It works.

When Mrs. Jones returns to the office, all of her victims are angry with her. When she flees their wrath, they chase her home, where she finds the other three casualties of her baking. After some persuading, they get her to throw the biscuits away.

== Release ==
At its release in June 1909, the comedy was distributed to theaters on a "split reel", which was a single projection reel that accommodated more than one motion picture. It shared its reel with another Biograph short directed by Griffith, the drama The Faded Lilies.

== Preservation ==
Prints of both films are preserved in the film archive of the Library of Congress.

== Cast ==
- John R. Cumpson as Mr. Jones
- Florence Lawrence as Mrs. Jones
- Linda Arvidson
- Charles Avery as Biscuit Victim
- Dorothy Bernard
- Clara T. Bracy
- Charles Craig
- Flora Finch
- Guy Hedlund
- Anita Hendrie as Biscuit Victim
- Arthur V. Johnson as Biscuit Victim
- Marion Leonard as Biscuit Victim
- Jeanie MacPherson as Secretary
- Owen Moore as Biscuit Victim
- Anthony O'Sullivan as Workman
- Mary Pickford as Biscuit Victim
