= Mr. Jones at the Ball =

1908 film directed by D. W. Griffith

- Directed by: D. W. Griffith
- Written by: D. W. Griffith
- Starring: John R. Cumpson
- Cinematography: G. W. Bitzer
- Release date: December 25, 1908
- Running time: 8 minutes (one reel)
- Country: United States
- Language: Silent

Mr. Jones at the Ball is a 1908 American silent short comedy film directed by D. W. Griffith.

== Cast ==
- John R. Cumpson as Mr. Jones
- Florence Lawrence as Mrs. Jones
- Mack Sennett as Butler / Policeman
- George Gebhardt as Man in Blackface / Guest at Ball
- Charles Inslee as Guest at Ball
- Arthur V. Johnson as Guest
- Jeanie MacPherson as Guest at Ball
- Harry Solter as Guest at Ball
- Marion Sunshine as Guest
