= Mr. Jones Has a Card Party =

1909 film directed by D. W. Griffith

- Directed by: D. W. Griffith
- Written by: D. W. Griffith; Frank E. Woods
- Starring: John R. Cumpson
- Cinematography: G. W. Bitzer
- Release date: January 21, 1909
- Running time: 10 minutes (one reel)
- Country: United States
- Language: Silent

Mr. Jones Has a Card Party is a 1909 American silent short comedy film directed by D. W. Griffith. A print of the film exists.

== Cast ==
- John R. Cumpson as Mr. Jones
- Florence Lawrence as Mrs. Jones
- Linda Arvidson as The Maid
- Flora Finch as Guest
- Robert Harron as A Messenger
- Anita Hendrie as Guest
- Charles Inslee as Guest
- Arthur V. Johnson as Guest
- Jeanie MacPherson as Guest
- Mack Sennett as Guest
- Harry Solter as Guest
