= Mrs. Jones Entertains =

1909 film directed by D. W. Griffith

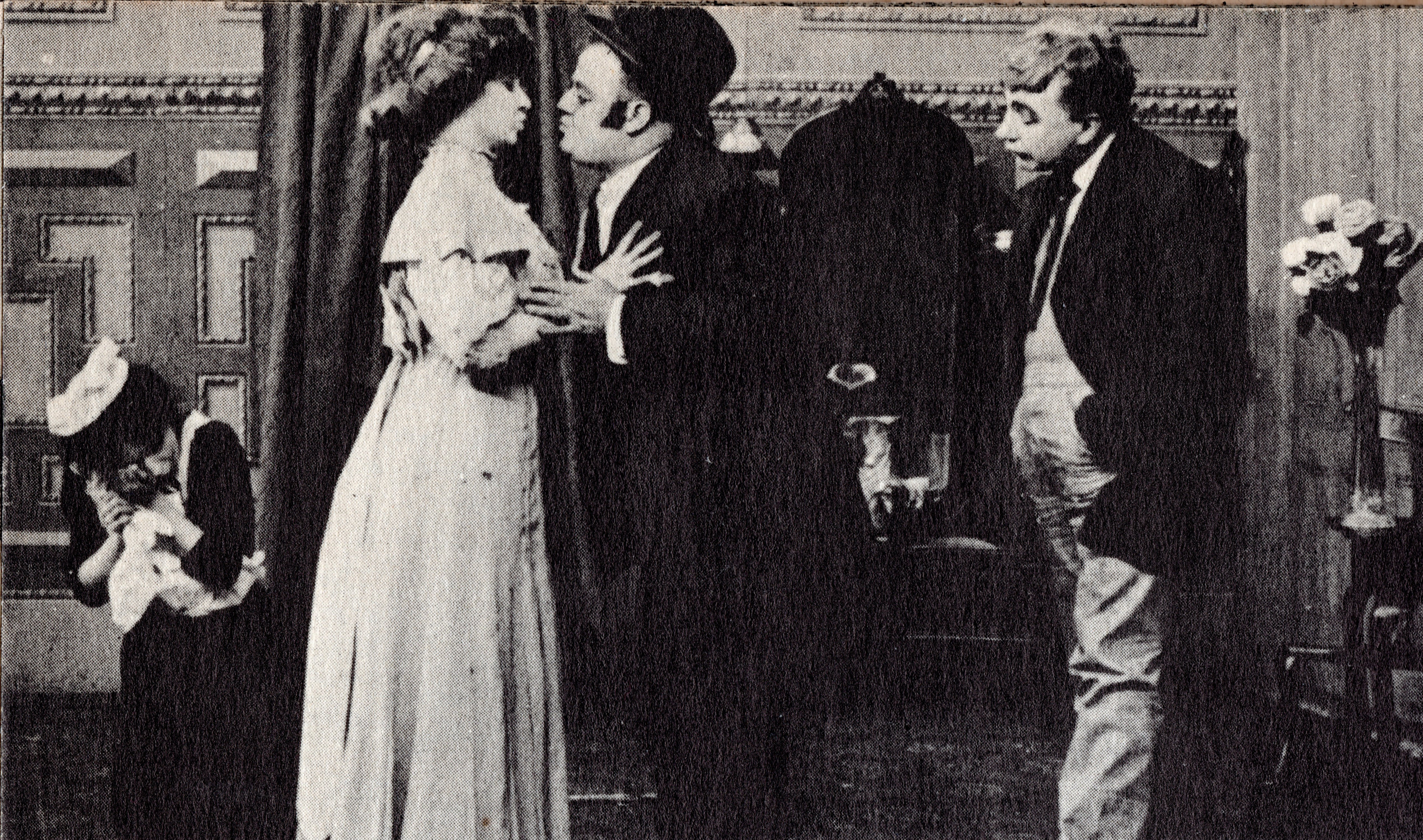
- Directed by: D. W. Griffith
- Written by: D. W. Griffith; Frank E. Woods
- Starring: John R. Cumpson
- Cinematography: G. W. Bitzer
- Release date: January 9, 1909
- Running time: 11 minutes (one reel)
- Country: United States
- Language: Silent

Mrs. Jones Entertains is a 1909 American silent short comedy film directed by D. W. Griffith. The Internet Movie Database lists Mary Pickford as appearing in this short. However, Pickford did not begin with Biograph until the end of April 1909.

== Plot ==
Dear little Mrs. Jones once gave a tea party to her temperance friends, at which Mr. Jones unfortunately got intoxicated. So his presence was objected to when the ladies met again. As luck would have it the waiter who was to serve the repast could not come, and so Jones, poor fellow, consented to disguise himself and act as waiter to his own wife's guests. These prim and virtuous ladies duly arrived; the meal was served and all proceeded happily until Jones, who received the dishes from a pert maid in the kitchen, was seized by a desire to try an experiment before the meal was finished. Discovering a bottle which appeared to contain a spirituous liquid, he poured some into each of the guests' cups. The effect of the experiment was soon apparent. The ladies got more communicative towards each; they warmed and melted: they clamored for more "tea"; they got quite boisterous and just slightly indecorous, and finally so abusive and intoxicated that Mrs. Jones had to clear them off, and then husband and wife were reconciled, presumably with a promise on his part to behave himself in future.

== Cast ==
- John R. Cumpson as Mr. Jones
- Florence Lawrence as Mrs. Jones
- Jeanie MacPherson as The Maid
- Linda Arvidson
- Flora Finch as A Guest
- Anthony O'Sullivan
- Mary Pickford as Dorothy Nicholson
- Mack Sennett
- Harry Solter as Delivery Man
