= List of Biograph films released in 1909 =

This is a list of all 142 Biograph films released in 1909.

== Releases ==
Title	Release	Ref	Notes	Status
One Touch of Nature	January 1, 1909			
The Honor of Thieves	January 11, 1909			
Love Finds a Way	January 11, 1909			
A Rural Elopement	January 14, 1909			
The Sacrifice	January 14, 1909			
The Criminal Hypnotist	January 18, 1909			
Those Boys!	January 18, 1909			
Mr. Jones Has a Card Party	January 21, 1909			
The Fascinating Mrs. Francis	January 21, 1909			
The Welcome Burglar	January 25, 1909			
Those Awful Hats	January 25, 1909			
The Cord of Life	January 28, 1909			
The Girls and Daddy	February 1, 1909			
The Brahma Diamond	February 1, 1909			
A Wreath in Time	February 8, 1909			
Edgar Allen Poe [sic]	February 8, 1909			
The Curtain Pole	February 15, 1909			
His Ward's Love	February 15, 1909			
The Hindoo Dagger	February 18, 1909			
The Joneses Have Amateur Theatricals	February 18, 1909			
The Politician's Love Story	February 22, 1909			
The Golden Louis	February 22, 1909			
At the Altar	February 25, 1909			
His Wife's Mother	March 1, 1909			
The Prussian Spy	March 1, 1909			
A Fool's Revenge	March 4, 1909			
The Roue's Heart	March 8, 1909			
The Wooden Leg	March 8, 1909			
The Salvation Army Lass	March 11, 1909			
The Lure of the Gown	March 15, 1909			
I Did It, Mamma	March 15, 1909			
The Voice of the Violin	March 18, 1909			
The Deception	March 22, 1909			
And a Little Child Shall Lead Them	March 22, 1909			
A Burglar's Mistake	March 25, 1909			
The Medicine Bottle	March 29, 1909			
Jones and His New Neighbors	March 29, 1909			
A Drunkard's Reformation	April 1, 1909			
The Road to the Heart	April 5, 1909			
Trying to Get Arrested	April 5, 1909			
A Rude Hostess	April 8, 1909			
Schneider's Anti-Noise Crusade	April 8, 1909			
The Winning Coat	April 12, 1909			
A Sound Sleeper	April 12, 1909			
Confidence	April 15, 1909			
Lady Helen's Escapade	April 19, 1909			
A Troublesome Satchel	April 19, 1909			
Lucky Jim	April 26, 1909			
Twin Brothers	April 26, 1909			
'Tis an Ill Wind that Blows no Good	April 29, 1909			
The Eavesdropper	May 3, 1909			
The Suicide Club	May 3, 1909			
The Note in the Shoe	May 6, 1909			
One Busy Hour	May 6, 1909			
A French Duel	May 10, 1909			
Jones and the Lady Book Agent	May 10, 1909			
A Baby's Shoe	May 13, 1909			
The Jilt	May 17, 1909			
Resurrection	May 20, 1909			
Eloping with Aunty	May 24, 1909			
Two Memories	May 24, 1909			
The Cricket on the Hearth	May 27, 1909			
What Drink Did	May 31, 1909			
Eradicating Aunty	June 3, 1909			
His Duty	June 3, 1909			
The Violin Maker of Cremona	June 7, 1909			
The Lonely Villa	June 10, 1909			
A New Trick	June 10, 1909			
The Son's Return	June 14, 1909			
Her First Biscuits	June 17, 1909			
The Faded Lilies	June 17, 1909			
Was Justice Served?	June 21, 1909			
The Peachbasket Hat	June 24, 1909			
The Mexican Sweethearts	June 24, 1909			
The Way of Man	June 28, 1909			
The Necklace	July 1, 1909			
The Message	July 5, 1909			
The Country Doctor (1909 film)	July 8, 1909			
The Cardinal's Conspiracy	July 12, 1909			
The Friend of the Family	July 15, 1909			
Tender Hearts	July 15, 1909			
The Renunciation	July 19, 1909			
Sweet and Twenty	July 22, 1909			
Jealousy and the Man	July 22, 1909			
A Convict's Sacrifice	July 26, 1909			
The Slave	July 29, 1909			
A Strange Meeting	August 2, 1909			
The Mended Lute	August 5, 1909			
They Would Elope	August 9, 1909			
Jones' Burglar	August 9, 1909			
The Better Way	August 12, 1909			
With Her Card	August 16, 1909			
His Wife's Visitor	August 19, 1909			
Mrs. Jones' Lover; or I Want My Hat	August 19, 1909			
The Indian Runner's Romance	August 23, 1909			
The Seventh Day	August 26, 1909			
Oh, Uncle!	August 26, 1909			
The Mills of the Gods	August 30, 1909			
Pranks	August 30, 1909			
The Sealed Room	September 2, 1909			
The Little Darling	September 2, 1909			
The Hessian Renegades	September 6, 1909			
Comata, the Sioux	September 9, 1909			
Getting Even	September 13, 1909			
The Children's Friend	September 13, 1909			
The Broken Locket	September 16, 1909			
In Old Kentucky	September 20, 1909			
A Fair Exchange	September 23, 1909			
Leather Stocking	September 27, 1909			
The Awakening	September 30, 1909			
Wanted, a Child	September 30, 1909			
Pippa Passes (film)	October 4, 1909			
Fools of Fate	October 7, 1909			
The Little Teacher	October 11, 1909			
A Change of Heart	October 14, 1909			
His Lost Love	October 18, 1909			
Expiation	October 21, 1909			
In the Watches of the Night	October 25, 1909			
Lines of White on a Sullen Sea	October 28, 1909			
The Gibson Goddess	November 1, 1909			
What's Your Hurry	November 1, 1909			
Nursing a Viper	November 4, 1909			Extant
The Restoration	November 8, 1909			
The Light that Came	November 11, 1909			
Two Women and a Man	November 15, 1909			
A Midnight Adventure	November 18, 1909			
Sweet Revenge	November 18, 1909			
The Open Gate	November 22, 1909			
The Mountaineer's Honor	November 25, 1909			
The Trick that Failed	November 29, 1909			
In the Window Recess	November 29, 1909			
The Death Disc: A Story of the Cromwellian Period	December 2, 1909			
Through the Breakers	December 6, 1909			
The Red Man's View	December 9, 1909			
A Corner in Wheat	December 13, 1909			
In a Hempen Bag	December 16, 1909			
The Test	December 16, 1909			
A Trap for Santa Claus	December 20, 1909			
In Little Italy	December 23, 1909			
To Save Her Soul	December 27, 1909			
The Day After (1909 film)	December 30, 1909			
Choosing a Husband	December 30, 1909			

== Bibliography ==
- Moving Picture World Volume 4. New York, Chalmers Publishing Company. 1909.
- Moving Picture World Volume 5. New York, Chalmers Publishing Company. 1909.
