= D. W. Griffith filmography =

These are the films directed by the pioneering American filmmaker D. W. Griffith (1875–1948). According to IMDb, he directed 41 feature-length and 478 short films between 1908 and 1931.

== 1908 ==
- The Adventures of Dollie
- The Fight for Freedom (director disputed)
- The Tavern Keeper's Daughter
- The Black Viper
- The Red Man and the Child
- Deceived Slumming Party
- The Bandit's Waterloo
- A Calamitous Elopement
- The Greaser's Gauntlet
- The Man and the Woman
- The Fatal Hour
- For Love of Gold
- Balked at the Altar
- For a Wife's Honor
- Betrayed by a Handprint
- Monday Morning in a Coney Island Police Court
- The Girl and the Outlaw
- Behind the Scenes
- The Red Girl
- The Heart of O'Yama
- Where the Breakers Roar
- A Smoked Husband
- The Stolen Jewels
- The Devil
- The Zulu's Heart
- Father Gets in the Game
- Ingomar, the Barbarian
- The Vaquero's Vow
- The Planter's Wife
- Romance of a Jewess
- The Call of the Wild
- Concealing a Burglar
- After Many Years
- The Pirate's Gold
- The Taming of the Shrew
- The Guerrilla
- The Song of the Shirt
- The Ingrate
- A Woman's Way
- The Clubman and the Tramp
- Money Mad
- The Valet's Wife
- The Feud and the Turkey
- The Reckoning
- The Test of Friendship
- An Awful Moment
- The Christmas Burglars
- Mr. Jones at the Ball
- The Helping Hand

== 1909 ==
- One Touch of Nature
- The Maniac Cook
- Mrs. Jones Entertains
- The Honor of Thieves
- Love Finds a Way
- The Sacrifice
- A Rural Elopement
- Those Boys!
- The Criminal Hypnotist
- The Fascinating Mrs. Francis
- Mr. Jones Has a Card Party
- Those Awful Hats
- The Welcome Burglar
- The Cord of Life
- The Girls and Daddy
- The Brahma Diamond
- Edgar Allen Poe
- A Wreath in Time
- Tragic Love
- The Curtain Pole
- His Ward's Love
- The Joneses Have Amateur Theatricals
- The Hindoo Dagger
- The Politician's Love Story
- The Golden Louis
- At the Altar
- The Prussian Spy
- His Wife's Mother
- A Fool's Revenge
- The Wooden Leg
- The Roue's Heart
- The Salvation Army Lass
- The Lure of the Gown
- I Did It
- The Voice of the Violin
- The Deception
- And a Little Child Shall Lead Them
- A Burglar's Mistake
- The Medicine Bottle
- Jones and His New Neighbors
- A Drunkard's Reformation
- Trying to Get Arrested
- The Road to the Heart
- A Rude Hostess
- Schneider's Anti-Noise Crusade
- The Winning Coat
- A Sound Sleeper
- Confidence
- A Troublesome Satchel
- Lady Helen's Escapade
- The Drive for a Life
- Twin Brothers
- Lucky Jim
- Tis an Ill Wind That Blows No Good
- The Suicide Club
- The Eavesdropper
- One Busy Hour
- The Note in the Shoe
- Jones and the Lady Book Agent
- The French Duel
- A Baby's Shoe
- The Jilt
- Resurrection
- Two Memories
- Eloping with Auntie
- The Cricket on the Hearth
- His Duty
- Eradicating Aunty
- What Drink Did
- The Violin Maker of Cremona
- A New Trick
- The Lonely Villa
- The Son's Return
- Her First Biscuits
- The Faded Lilies
- Was Justice Served?
- The Peachbasket Hat
- The Mexican Sweethearts
- The Way of Man
- The Necklace
- The Message
- The Country Doctor
- The Cardinal's Conspiracy
- Tender Hearts
- The Friend of the Family
- The Renunciation
- Sweet and Twenty
- Jealousy and the Man
- A Convict's Sacrifice
- The Slave
- A Strange Meeting
- The Mended Lute
- They Would Elope
- Jones' Burglar
- The Better Way
- With Her Card
- Mrs. Jones' Lover or I Want My Hat
- His Wife's Visitor
- The Indian Runner's Romance
- The Seventh Day
- Oh, Uncle!
- Pranks
- The Mills of the Gods
- The Sealed Room
- The Little Darling
- The Hessian Renegades
- Comata, the Sioux
- Getting Even
- The Children's Friend
- The Broken Locket
- In Old Kentucky
- A Fair Exchange
- Leather Stocking
- Wanted, a Child
- The Awakening
- Pippa Passes or The Song of Conscience
- Fools of Fate
- The Little Teacher
- A Change of Heart
- His Lost Love
- The Expiation
- In the Watches of the Night
- Lines of White on a Sullen Sea
- What's Your Hurry?
- The Gibson Goddess
- Nursing a Viper
- The Restoration
- The Light That Came
- Two Women and a Man
- A Sweet Revenge
- A Midnight Adventure
- The Open Gate
- The Mountaineer's Honor
- The Trick That Failed
- In the Window Recess
- The Death Disc: A Story of the Cromwellian Period
- Through the Breakers
- The Red Man's View
- A Corner in Wheat
- The Test
- In a Hempen Bag
- A Trap for Santa Claus
- In Little Italy
- To Save Her Soul
- The Day After
- Choosing a Husband
- The Heart of an Outlaw
- Mamma
- Bill Sharkey's Last Game

== 1910 ==
- The Rocky Road
- The Dancing Girl of Butte
- Her Terrible Ordeal
- On the Reef
- The Call
- The Honor of His Family
- The Last Deal
- The Cloister's Touch
- The Woman from Mellon's
- The Course of True Love
- The Duke's Plan
- One Night and Then
- The Englishman and the Girl
- His Last Burglary
- Taming a Husband
- The Final Settlement
- The Newlyweds
- The Thread of Destiny
- In Old California
- The Man
- The Converts
- Faithful
- The Twisted Trail
- Gold Is Not All
- The Smoker (director disputed)
- His Last Dollar
- The Two Brothers
- As It Is In Life
- A Rich Revenge
- A Romance of the Western Hills
- Thou Shalt Not
- The Tenderfoot's Triumph (director disputed)
- The Way of the World
- Up a Tree (director disputed)
- The Gold Seekers
- The Unchanging Sea
- Love Among the Roses
- Over Silent Paths
- An Affair of Hearts (director disputed)
- Ramona
- A Knot in the Plot (director disputed)
- The Impalement
- In the Season of Buds
- The Purgation
- A Child of the Ghetto
- A Victim of Jealousy
- In the Border States
- The Face at the Window
- Never Again (director disputed)
- May and December (director disputed)
- The Marked Time-Table
- A Child's Impulse
- Muggsy's First Sweetheart
- A Midnight Cupid
- What the Daisy Said
- A Child's Faith
- A Flash of Light
- Serious Sixteen
- As the Bells Rang Out!
- The Call to Arms
- Unexpected Help
- An Arcadian Maid
- Her Father's Pride
- The House with Closed Shutters (Civil War story)
- A Salutary Lesson
- The Usurer
- An Old Story with a New Ending (director disputed)
- The Sorrows of the Unfaithful
- Wilful Peggy
- The Modern Prodigal
- The Affair of an Egg (director disputed)
- A Summer Idyll
- Little Angels of Luck
- A Mohawk's Way
- In Life's Cycle
- A Summer Tragedy (director disputed)
- The Oath and the Man
- Rose O'Salem-Town
- Examination Day at School
- The Iconoclast
- That Chink at Golden Gulch
- The Broken Doll
- The Banker's Daughters
- The Message of the Violin
- Two Little Waifs
- Waiter No. 5
- The Fugitive
- Simple Charity
- Sunshine Sue
- The Song of the Wildwood Flute
- His New Lid (director disputed)
- A Plain Song
- A Child's Stratagem
- The Golden Supper
- His Sister-In-Law
- The Lesson
- White Roses (director disputed)
- Winning Back His Love

== 1911 ==
- Flaming Arrows
- The Two Paths
- When a Man Loves
- The Italian Barber
- His Trust
- His Trust Fulfilled
- Fate's Turning
- The Poor Sick Men (director disputed)
- A Wreath of Orange Blossoms
- Three Sisters
- Heart Beats of Long Ago
- What Shall We Do with Our Old?
- Fisher Folks
- The Diamond Star
- His Daughter
- The Lily of the Tenements
- The Heart of a Savage
- A Decree of Destiny
- Conscience
- Was He a Coward?
- Teaching Dad to Like Her
- The Lonedale Operator
- The Spanish Gypsy
- The Broken Cross
- The Chief's Daughter
- Paradise Lost (director disputed)
- Madame Rex
- A Knight of the Road
- His Mother's Scarf
- How She Triumphed
- The Two Sides
- In the Days of '49
- The New Dress
- The Crooked Road
- The White Rose of the Wilds
- A Romany Tragedy
- The Smile of a Child
- Enoch Arden: Part I
- Enoch Arden: Part II
- The Primal Call
- Her Sacrifice
- Fighting Blood
- The Thief and the Girl
- The Jealous Husband
- Bobby, the Coward
- The Indian Brothers
- A Country Cupid
- The Last Drop of Water
- Out from the Shadow
- The Ruling Passion
- The Sorrowful Example
- The Blind Princess and the Poet
- The Rose of Kentucky
- Swords and Hearts
- The Stuff Heroes Are Made Of
- The Old Confectioner's Mistake
- The Squaw's Love
- Dan the Dandy
- The Revenue Man and the Girl
- Her Awakening
- The Making of a Man
- Italian Blood
- The Unveiling
- The Adventures of Billy
- The Long Road
- Love in the Hills
- The Battle (Civil War story)
- The Trail of Books
- Through Darkened Vales
- The Miser's Heart
- Sunshine Through the Dark
- A Woman Scorned
- The Failure
- Saved from Himself
- As in a Looking Glass
- A Terrible Discovery
- The Voice of the Child

== 1912 ==
- Grannie
- The Baby and the Stork
- A Tale of the Wilderness
- The Eternal Mother
- The Old Bookkeeper
- For His Son
- A Blot on the 'Scutcheon
- The Transformation of Mike
- A Sister's Love
- Billy's Stratagem
- The Mender of Nets
- Under Burning Skies
- The Sunbeam
- A Siren of Impulse
- A String of Pearls
- The Girl and Her Trust
- Iola's Promise
- The Root of Evil
- The Goddess of Sagebrush Gulch
- The Punishment
- Fate's Interception
- The Female of the Species
- Just Like a Woman
- One Is Business, the Other Crime
- The Lesser Evil
- The Old Actor
- A Lodging for the Night
- His Lesson
- When Kings Were the Law
- A Beast at Bay
- An Outcast Among Outcasts
- Home Folks
- A Temporary Truce
- Lena and the Geese
- The Spirit Awakened
- The School Teacher and the Waif
- Man's Lust for Gold
- An Indian Summer
- Man's Genesis
- Heaven Avenges
- The Sands of Dee
- Black Sheep
- The Narrow Road
- A Child's Remorse
- The Inner Circle
- A Change of Spirit
- A Pueblo Romance
- A Pueblo Legend
- In the North Woods
- An Unseen Enemy
- Blind Love
- Two Daughters of Eve
- Friends
- So Near, yet So Far
- A Feud in the Kentucky Hills
- The Chief's Blanket
- In the Aisles of the Wild
- The One She Loved
- The Painted Lady
- The Musketeers of Pig Alley
- Heredity
- The Massacre
- Gold and Glitter
- My Baby
- The Informer
- Brutality
- The New York Hat
- My Hero
- The Burglar's Dilemma
- A Cry for Help
- The God Within

== 1913 ==
- Three Friends
- The Telephone Girl and the Lady
- An Adventure in the Autumn Woods
- The Tender Hearted Boy
- A Misappropriated Turkey
- Brothers
- Oil and Water
- Drink's Lure
- A Chance Deception
- Love in an Apartment Hotel
- Broken Ways
- A Girl's Stratagem
- The Unwelcome Guest
- Near to Earth
- Fate
- A Welcome Intruder
- The Sheriff's Baby
- The Hero of Little Italy
- The Perfidy of Mary
- The Little Tease
- A Misunderstood Boy
- The Left-Handed Man
- The Lady and the Mouse
- If We Only Knew
- The Wanderer
- The Stolen Loaf
- The House of Darkness
- The Yaqui Cur
- Just Gold
- His Mother's Son
- The Ranchero's Revenge
- A Timely Interception
- Death's Marathon
- The Mothering Heart
- Her Mother's Oath
- The Sorrowful Shore
- The Reformers; or, The Lost Art of Minding One's Business
- The Enemy's Baby
- The Mistake
- The Coming of Angelo
- Two Men of the Desert
- The Adopted Brother
- Madonna of the Storm
- The Battle at Elderbush Gulch
- The Conscience of Hassan Bey

== 1914 ==
- Waifs
- Judith of Bethulia
- The Battle of the Sexes
- The Great Leap; Until Death Do Us Part
- Brute Force
- Home, Sweet Home
- The Escape
- The Avenging Conscience: or 'Thou Shalt Not Kill'
- The Dishonored Medal

== 1915 ==
- The Birth of a Nation

== 1916 ==
- A Day with Governor Whitman
- Intolerance

== 1918 ==
- Hearts of the World
- The Great Love
- Lillian Gish in a Liberty Loan Appeal
- The Greatest Thing in Life

== 1919 ==
- The World of Columbus
- A Romance of Happy Valley
- The Girl Who Stayed at Home
- Broken Blossoms
- True Heart Susie
- The Fall of Babylon (re-edited version of said sequence from Intolerance)
- The Mother and the Law (re-edited version of said sequence from Intolerance)
- Scarlet Days
- The Greatest Question

== 1920 ==
- The Idol Dancer
- Remodeling Her Husband (director disputed)
- The Love Flower
- Way Down East

== 1921 ==
- Dream Street
- Orphans of the Storm

== 1922 ==
- One Exciting Night
- Mammy's Boy (never completed, remade as His Darker Self by another director in 1924)

== 1923 ==
- The White Rose

== 1924 ==
- America
- Isn't Life Wonderful

== 1925 ==
- Sally of the Sawdust
- That Royle Girl

== 1926 ==
- The Sorrows of Satan

== 1927 ==
- Topsy and Eva (co-director, uncredited)

== 1928 ==
- Drums of Love
- The Battle of the Sexes

== 1929 ==
- Lady of the Pavements

== 1930 ==
- Abraham Lincoln (first Griffith sound film)

== 1931 ==
- The Struggle (last film)
