= List of drama films of the 1900s =

This is a list of drama films of the 1900s.

== 1901 ==
- Fire!

== 1908 ==
- The Black Viper
- The Helping Hand
- The Song of the Shirt
- Choosing a royal bride
- The Reconciliation
- El pastorcito de Torrente
- Don Álvaro o la fuerza del sino
- Don Quijote
- Amleto

== 1909 ==
- At the Altar
- A Corner in Wheat
- The Country Doctor
- A Drunkard's Reformation
- Fools of Fate
- The Golden Louis
- The Hessian Renegades
- The Lonely Villa
- A Midsummer Night's Dream
- Les Misérables
- Resurrection
- The Sealed Room
- A Trap for Santa Claus

• Vadim

• O Nono Mandamento

• Camila O'Gorman

• The Scottish Covenanters

• Heroes of the Cross

• Sonho de Valsa

• The Life of Moses

• Gøngehøvdingen

• Revolutionsbryllup

• Locura de amor

• Et budskab til Napoleon paa Elba

• Andreas Hofer
