= In Old Kentucky =

In Old Kentucky may refer to:

- In Old Kentucky (1909 film), an American silent short drama film
- In Old Kentucky (1919 film), an American silent drama film
- In Old Kentucky (1927 film), an American silent drama film
- In Old Kentucky (1935 film), an American comedy film
- In Old Kentucky (stage play), see Louise Closser Hale
