= David Miles (actor) =

American actor and director

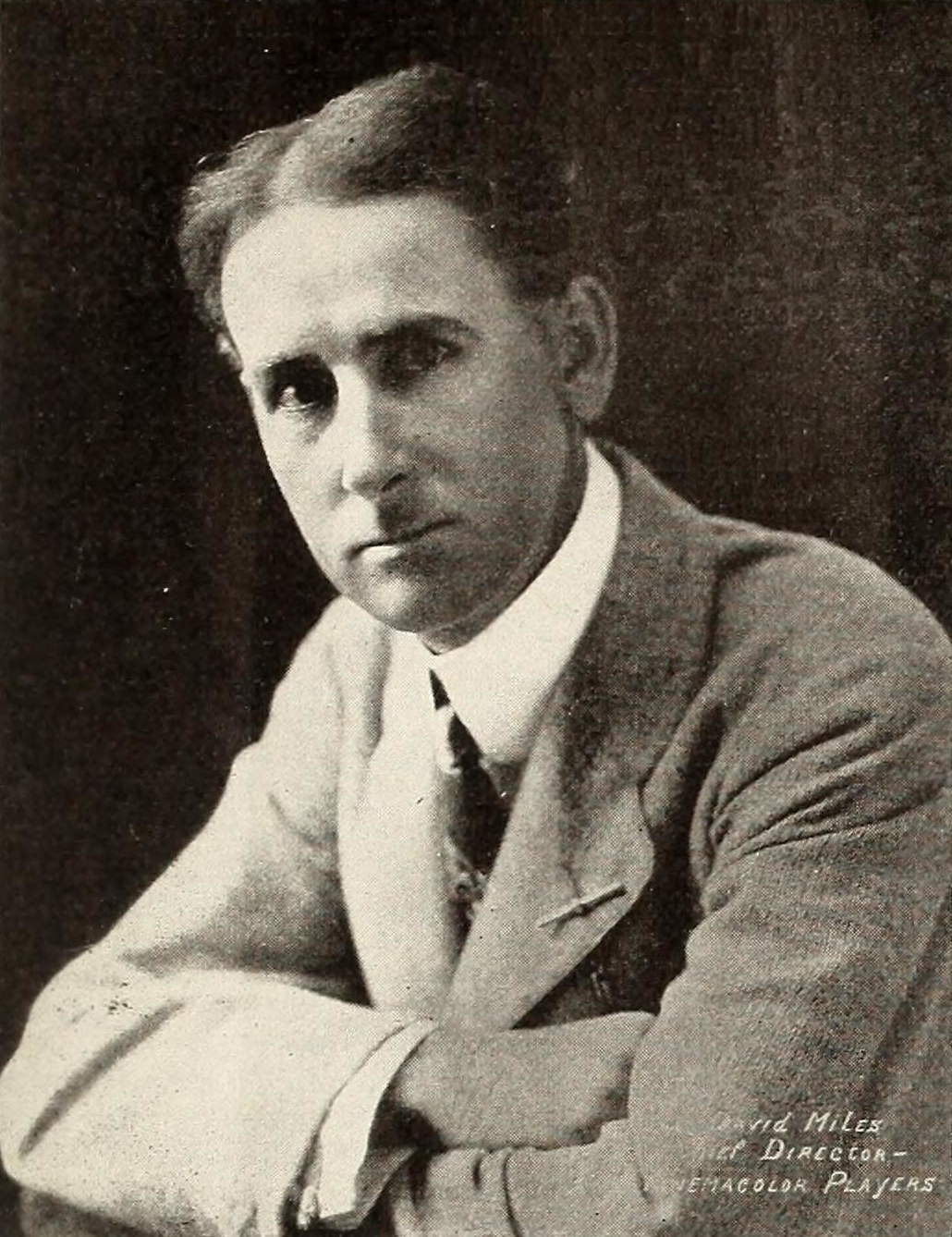
- Born: October 26, 1871; Milford, Connecticut, U.S.
- Died: October 28, 1915 (aged 44); New York City, New York, U.S.
- Occupations: Actor; Director
- Years active: 1909–1915

David Miles (October 26, 1871 – October 28, 1915) was an American actor and director. Born in Milford, Connecticut, he became a Hollywood actor and was head of dramatic production at the Kinemacolor Company of America until October 1913. Later, he owned David Miles, Inc., a film making company in Los Angeles, California. He died of a sudden hemorrhage while walking with his secretary in New York City, aged 44.

== Partial filmography ==
=== As actor ===
All 1909 shorts, unless otherwise noted.

- The Helping Hand
- The Maniac Cook
- The Honor of Thieves
- Love Finds a Way
- A Rural Elopement
- The Criminal Hypnotist
- The Welcome Burglar
- The Cord of Life
- The Girls and Daddy
- The Brahma Diamond
- Edgar Allen Poe
- A Wreath in Time
- Tragic Love
- The Joneses Have Amateur Theatricals
- His Wife's Mother
- The Politician's Love Story
- At the Altar
- The Prussian Spy
- The Wooden Leg
- The Roue's Heart
- The Voice of the Violin
- The Deception
- And a Little Child Shall Lead Them
- A Burglar's Mistake
- A Drunkard's Reformation
- Trying to Get Arrested
- The Road to the Heart
- Lucky Jim
- Lady Helen's Escapade
- Two Memories
- The Cricket on the Hearth
- The Violin Maker of Cremona
- The Lonely Villa
- An Outcast Among Outcasts (1912 short)

=== As director ===
- The Closed Bible (1912 short)
- How To Live 100 Years (1913 Kinemacolor short)
- The Scarlet Letter (1913 Kinemacolor short)
- Local Color (1913 Kinemacolor short)
