= His Wife's Mother =

His Wife's Mother can refer to:

- His Wife's Mother (1909 film), a 1909 American silent film directed by D. W. Griffith
- His Wife's Mother (1932 film), a 1932 British film directed by Harry Hughes
