= The Cricket on the Hearth (1909 film) =

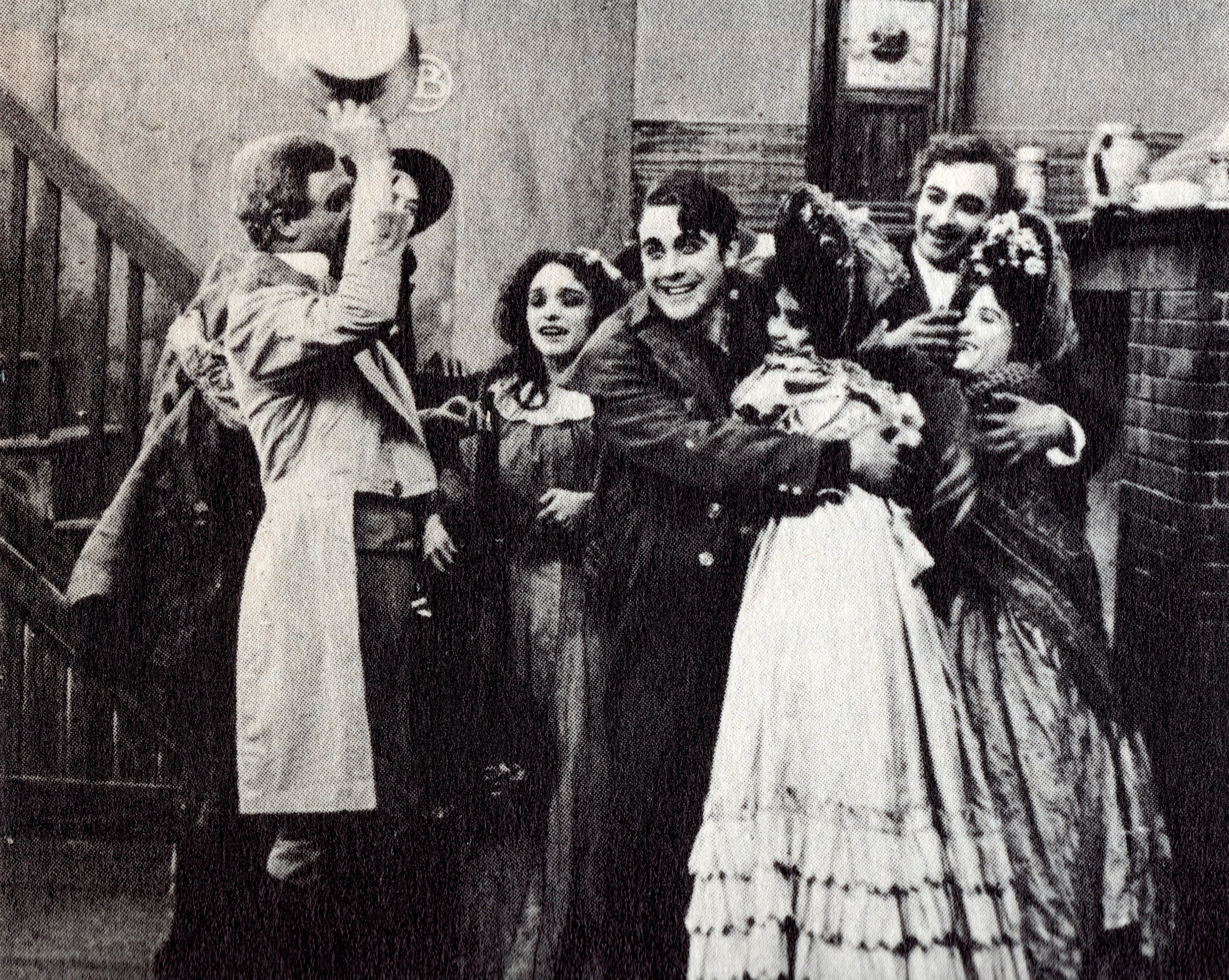
- Still from film
- Directed by: D. W. Griffith
- Written by: Frank E. Woods
- Based on: The Cricket on the Hearth by Charles Dickens
- Starring: Owen Moore
- Cinematography: Billy Bitzer; Arthur Marvin
- Production company: American Mutoscope and Biograph Company
- Distributed by: Biograph Company
- Release date: May 27, 1909
- Running time: 14-15 minutes (1 reel; original release length 989 feet)
- Country: United States
- Languages: Silent; English title card

The Cricket on the Hearth is a 1909 American silent short film directed by D. W. Griffith. It is based on the 1845 novella of the same name by Charles Dickens.

== Plot ==
The full film

Opening in the home of Caleb Plummer, an old toymaker, we see his son, Edward, departing for the sea. A tender farewell to father and blind sister, Bertha, takes him to the road where he bids adieu to his sweetheart, Mary Fielding. There is then a lapse of three years and we find honest John Pereyhingle the husband of Dot. Mrs. Fielding has gotten into moderate straits and consents to the marriage of Old Tackleton, the grouch, to May. This is repugnant to May, whose heart is set on Edward. Edward returns, stopping on the way at the King George Inn where he learns of the approaching nuptials of Tackleton and May. Borrowing a disguise from a strolling Merry Andrew, he goes in the garb of an old wayfarer on John’s cart to see Dot and find out the truth. John, prompted by Tackleton, watches the pair. Not recognising Edward, John assumes he is a lover. Edward upon learning from Dot how inimical the match is to May resolves to carry her away, which he does with the assistance of Dot. They are married in the roadway just as the much perturbed Tackleton appears. John discovers what a fool he has been in doubting Dot, Tackleton realises what an unpopular grouch he has been and decides to change, while Bertha and Old Caleb are overjoyed at the return of Edward.

== Cast ==
- Owen Moore - Edward Plummer
- Violet Mersereau - May Fielding
- Linda Arvidson - Sister Dorothy
- Dorothy West - Sister Bertha (unconfirmed)
- David Miles - Caleb Plummer
- George Nichols - Mr. Fielding
- Anita Hendrie - Mrs. Fielding
- Herbert Prior - John Peerybingle
- Mack Sennett - Merry Andrew
- Harry Solter - Tackleton
- John R. Cumpson - Innkeeper
- Arthur V. Johnson - The Minister

== See also ==
- D. W. Griffith filmography
