= The Maniac Cook =

1909 film directed by D. W. Griffith

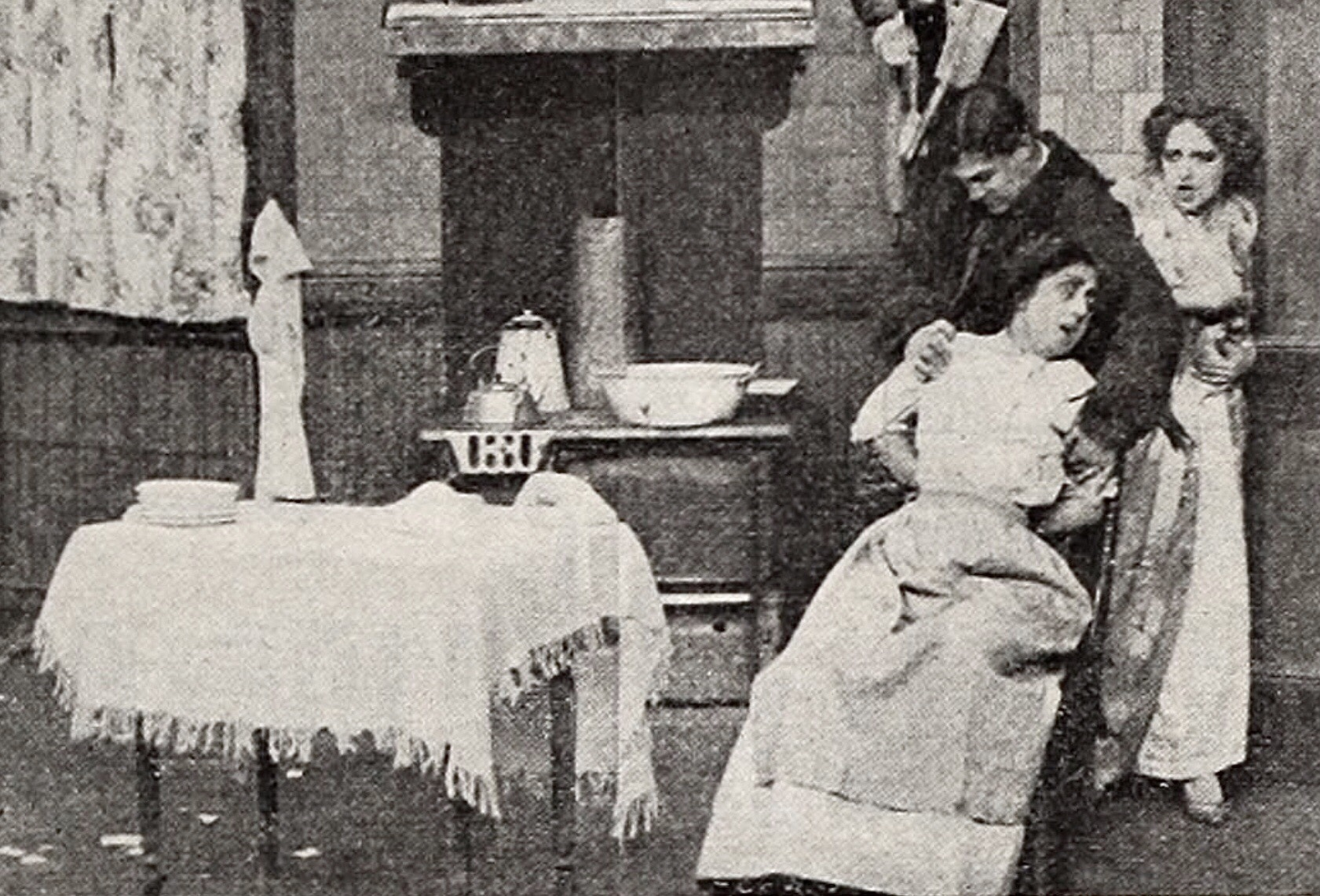
- Scene with actors (from left): Anita Hendrie, Harry Solter, and Marion Leonard
- Directed by: D. W. Griffith
- Produced by: Biograph Company; New York City
- Starring: Anita Hendrie; Harry Solter; Marion Leonard
- Cinematography: G. "Billy" Bitzer
- Distributed by: Biograph Company
- Release date: January 4, 1909
- Running time: 8 minutes (partial reel), 533 feet (Note: According to the reference How Movies Work by Bruce F. Kawin (New York: Macmillan Publishing Company, 1987, pp. 46-47), a full 1000-foot reel of film in the silent era had a maximum running time between 15 and 16 minutes. Silent films were generally projected at an average or "standard" speed of 16 frames per second, much slower than the 24 frames of later sound films.)
- Country: United States
- Language: Silent with English intertitles

The Maniac Cook is a 1909 American silent thriller film produced by the Biograph Company of New York, directed by D. W. Griffith, and starring Anita Hendrie in the title role. Principal cast members also include Harry Solter and Marion Leonard.

Footage from this short survives in several formats and is preserved among the holdings of the Motion Picture, Broadcasting, and Recorded Sound Division at the Library of Congress in Washington, D.C.

== Plot ==
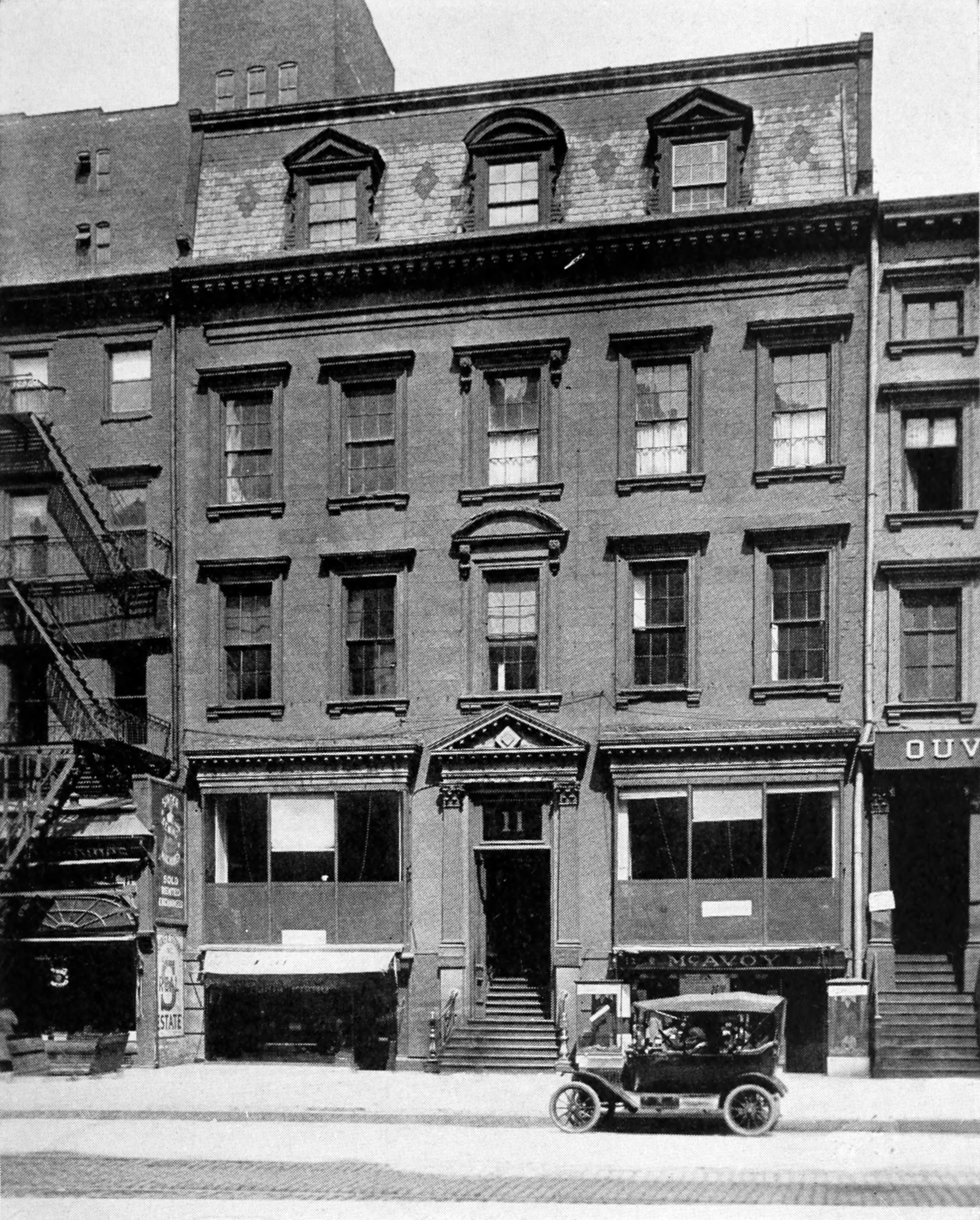
Biograph's Manhattan studio, where the "thriller" was filmed in two days in November 1908

In a 1985 published catalog of early silent films in its collection, the Library of Congress summarizes this Biograph short as a disturbing tale of a "mentally deranged cook" who "removes [her employers'] infant from its crib, and decides on a diabolical plot of putting the baby in the oven so that when the family lights the stove, they will be responsible for the baby's death."

A more detailed contemporary description of the film's storyline is also provided in the January 2, 1909 issue of the New York trade publication The Film Index:

"THE MANIAC COOK":—Biograph Story of a Child's Peril.—With the family of Mr. Holland there is employed a cook who has hitherto proved herself to be an honest, faithful and willing domestic. This evening, the little family, comprising Mr. and Mrs. Holland and their infant child, through dinner, leave Margie, the cook, in the kitchen finishing up her work. She is working about the room in an apparently light-hearted mood, when suddenly there comes a change over her, her usually pleasant countenance taking on a demoniac [sic] expression. She tries to shake off the strange feeling that has come over her, but in vain, with her hands to her head. At this moment Mrs. Holland enters, and Margie, in wild frenzy, leaps at her throat. Her screams bring Mr. Holland and they succeed in over-powering Margie and tying her to a chair. They go and telephone the police. Meanwhile, the cook, [with] supernatural effort, breaks from the chair and dashes out of the kitchen door, and with a fiend's cunning takes the key with her. So when Holland returns he finds the cook gone and therefore dismisses the policeman. Discovering the key gone he barricades the door, but they have hardly retired when the cook forces her way in. Picking up a butcher's cleaver she makes her way steathily through the house. Coming to the bedroom, her first impulse is to behead the sleeping forms of Mr. and Mrs. Holland, but a more fiendish idea strikes her as she sees the infant's cap. Going to the baby's crib, she gags it with a cloth and takes it to the kitchen, places it in the oven of the range, and proceeds to build a fire. In this she is interrupted by Mrs. Holland, who has come to get some hot water for her husband to relieve a sudden attack of indigestion, so she hides. Mr. Holland finds relief in a drink of whiskey, and follows to tell his wife to never mind. Mrs. Holland has already started the fire. As Holland enters, the cook pounces upon him and in the struggle they jar the oven door open, disclosing the baby's peril. The policeman, who have been searching the neighborhood, are attracted by the screams of Mrs. Holland and take the cook in charge, and baby is rescued from her precarious position none the worse off for her experience.

== Cast ==
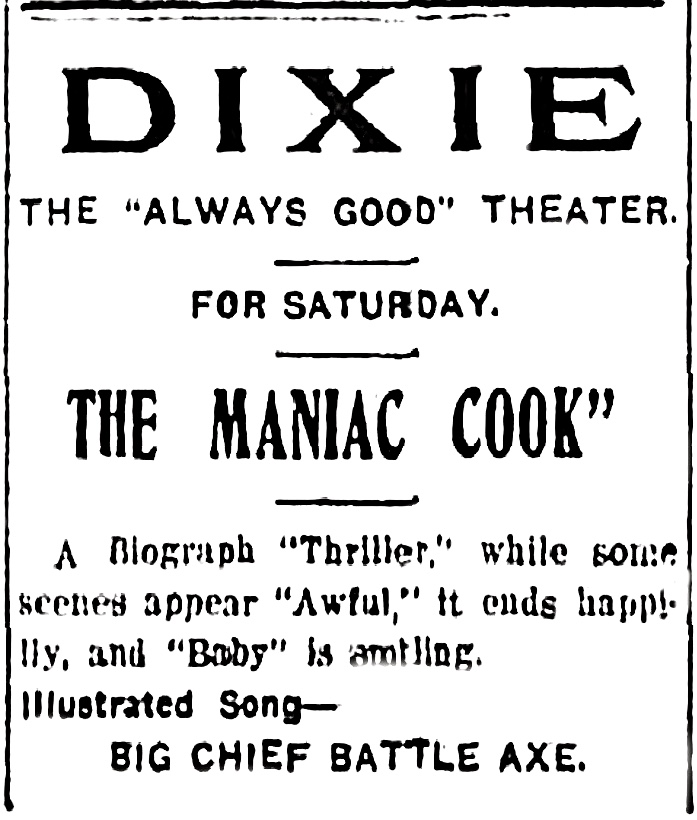
A West Virginia newspaper ad cautions theatergoers about "'Awful'" scenes in the film, January 1909.

- Anita Hendrie as Margie, the cook
- Harry Solter as Mr. Holland
- Marion Leonard as Mrs. Holland
- George Gebhardt as police officer
- Mack Sennett as police officer
- Clara T. Bracy in unverified role
- David Miles in unverified role

== Production ==
The screenplay was produced at Biograph's main studio in New York City, which in 1908 was located inside a large renovated brownstone mansion in Manhattan at 11 East 14th Street. (Note: The Internet Movie Database (IMDb) lists D. W. Griffith as the author of this film's screenplay, although no available period publication verifies this credit. Also, the 1985 reference D. W. Griffith and the Biograph Company, which was compiled by Cooper C. Graham, Steve Higgins, Elaine Mancini, and João Luiz Viera, provides production details on many Biograph pictures released between 1907 and 1913, including details about The Maniac Cook. In this reference, Griffith is credited as the short's director but is not cited as its author or, in the parlance of the time, its "scenarist". On page 7 of the publication, the compilers state, "...very few of the 1907-1909 films have an author credit attached to them because only scant information was to be found for those films pre-dating the period covered by the Story Register (1910-1916)." Refer to D. W. Griffith and the Biograph Company under "References" for additional information.) The film was one of many shorts that D. W. Griffith managed during his first year as a director for Biograph. His cinematographer on the project, G. W. "Billy" Bitzer, shot the drama over two days—on November 25 and 27, 1908—on interior sets at the Manhattan studio.

== Reception in 1909 ==
Remarks about the film published in 1909 newspapers and trade journals are generally quite brief and with few exceptions are connected to advertisements for the Biograph release and to its promotion at various theaters throughout the United States. In Utah, for example, the newspaper The Salt Lake Herald announces in its January 10, 1909 issue that The Maniac Cook is among a slate of "high class" motion pictures being presented at the Lyric Theatre and assures prospective ticket-buyers that the photoplay "causes real thrills". One film reviewer, however, in the January 9, 1909 issue of the New York trade journal The Moving Picture World does provide a fairly lengthy assessment of the thriller, one that touches on a series of elements pertaining to what the reviewer calls a "masterpiece", including comments about the short's cinematography, the believability of Anita Hendrie's acting style in the picture, as well as the emotional responses that some of its scenes evoked from theater audiences:

As a specimen of good photography, the Biograph Company is scoring a success in this film. It is one of the rare American films in which much attention is paid to the acting. All of the motions and expressions are correct and natural, perhaps too realistic, as when the cook arranges the legs of the child and takes the knife to cut them there is a general shudder among the audience and an impulse to run to the screen, to save the child. This unpleasant feeling does not last longer than in the other actions of the maniac, as in her deranged state of mind, she drops the knife without injuring the baby. The cook is a consummate actress, her face motions are well studied, she really acts the part of a demented person. The two other actors are as good, and if the subject is somewhat painful the production is a masterpiece, it is no mere moving pictures on a screen but the real art of the actor as displayed on our best stages. With this film the Biograph Company is bringing cinematography to a stage for cultivated folks and it is time that our manufacturers should produce something for the better classes, as the better classes are showing a disposition to patronize the picture show.

== Film's preservation status ==
A partial film negative and positive of The Maniac Cook survive in the Library of Congress (LC), which holds a 206-foot paper roll of contact prints produced directly frame-by-frame from the comedy's original 35mm master negative. (Note: The print of The Maniac Cook preserved in the Library of Congress is numbered "FLA5556"; the negative copy, "FRA2412". Refer to "Niver" cited in greater detail under "References".) Submitted by Biograph to the United States government in December 1908, shortly before the film's release, the roll is part of the original documentation required by federal authorities for motion picture companies in their applications to obtain copyright protection for their productions. (Note: The United States Copyright Office officially registered and granted Biograph a copyright for the film (#H120836) on December 30, 1908. Refer to "Graham", p. 33, under "References".) While the LC's paper roll of the film is certainly not projectable, a negative copy of the roll's paper images was made and transferred onto modern polyester-based safety film stock. From that negative footage a positive print could then be processed for screening. All of these copies were made as part of a preservation project carried out during the 1950s and early 1960s by Kemp R. Niver and other LC staff, who restored more than 3,000 early paper rolls of film images from the library's collection in order to create safety-stock copies.

== See also ==
- D. W. Griffith filmography
