= The Joneses Have Amateur Theatricals =

- Directed by: D. W. Griffith
- Produced by: Biograph Company
- Cinematography: G. W. Bitzer
- Distributed by: Biograph
- Release date: February 18, 1909
- Running time: 4 minutes
- Country: USA
- Language: Silent.. English

The Joneses Have Amateur Theatricals is a 1909 silent short comedy film directed by D. W. Griffith. It was released in split-reel form with The Hindoo Dagger.

== Cast ==
- John R. Cumpson – Mr. Jones
- Florence Lawrence – Mrs. Jones
- Linda Arvidson – The Maid
- Clara T. Bracy –
- George Gebhardt – Theatre Man
- Anita Hendrie – Theatre Woman
- Marion Leonard – Mrs. Trouble
- David Miles – Theatre Man
- Herbert Prior – Theatre Man
- Mack Sennett – Theatre Man
- Harry Solter –
- Dorothy West – Theatre Man
