= A Rude Hostess =

1909 film directed by D. W. Griffith

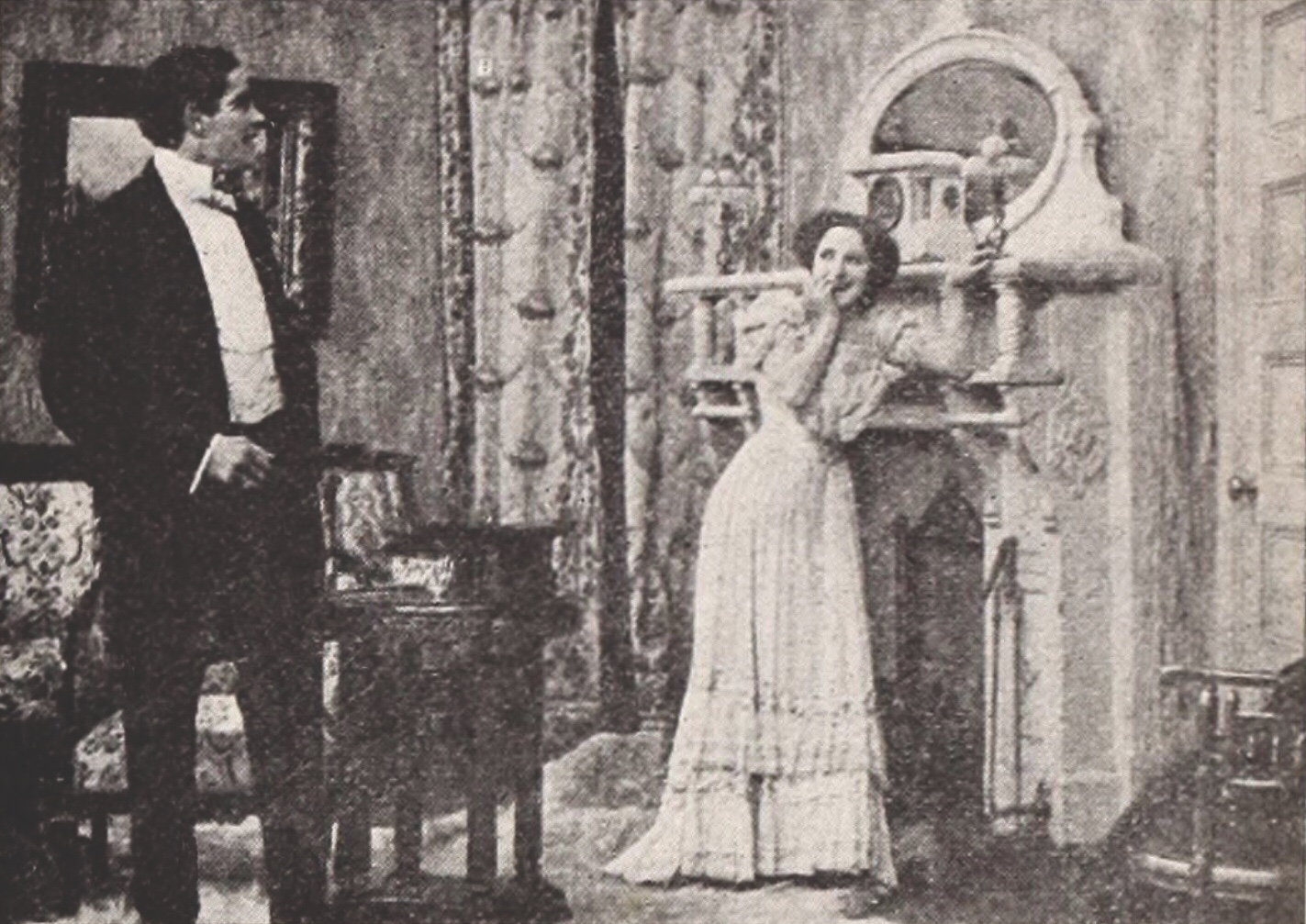
- Film still of actors Arthur V. Johnson and Marion Leonard in scene
- Directed by: D. W. Griffith
- Written by: D. W. Griffith
- Produced by: American Mutoscope and Biograph Company, Manhattan, New York
- Starring: Marion Leonard; Arthur V. Johnson
- Cinematography: G. W. Bitzer
- Release date: April 8, 1909
- Running time: 6-7 minutes, 439 feet (part of split-reel (Note: According to the reference How Movies Work by Bruce F. Kawin (New York: Macmillan Publishing Company, 1987, pp. 46-47), a full 1000-foot reel of film in the silent era had, on average, a maximum running time of 15 minutes. Also, silent films were generally projected at a "standard" speed of 16 frames per second, much slower than the 24 frames of later sound films.)
- Country: United States
- Language: Silent

A Rude Hostess is a 1909 American silent film comedy written and directed by D. W. Griffith, produced by the American Mutoscope and Biograph Company in New York City, and co-starring Marion Leonard and Arthur V. Johnson. At its release in April 1909, the short was distributed to theaters on a "split reel", which was a single reel that accommodated more than one film. A Rude Hostess shared its reel with another Biograph comedy short directed by Griffith, Schneider's Anti-Noise Crusade. Original contact-print paper rolls of both motion pictures, as well as projectable safety-stock copies of the films, are preserved in the Library of Congress.

== Plot ==
This light comedy's plot portrays a burglar's unsuccessful attempt to steal "money and jewels" from a wealthy woman's home. The following is a summary of the screenplay provided in Kemp R. Niver's extensive 1985 reference Early Motion Pictures: The Paper Print Collection in the Library of Congress:

A handsome burglar (Arthur Johnson) dressed in dinner clothes is nearly surprised in the act of burglarizing a safe. He decides to bluff it out, and allows himself to be found as if inebriated. The woman of the house (Marion Leonard) returns from escorting guests out and finds the burglar. At the same time, she notices that the curtains hiding the safe have been moved. In order to not let the burglar escape, she begins to pay unusual attention to him until her butler is signaled to go for help. The film ends as the police arrive and take the handsome burglar into custody.... (Note: Another contemporary plot summary of the film can be found on page 412 in the April 3, 1909 issue of the New York trade journal The Moving Picture World.)

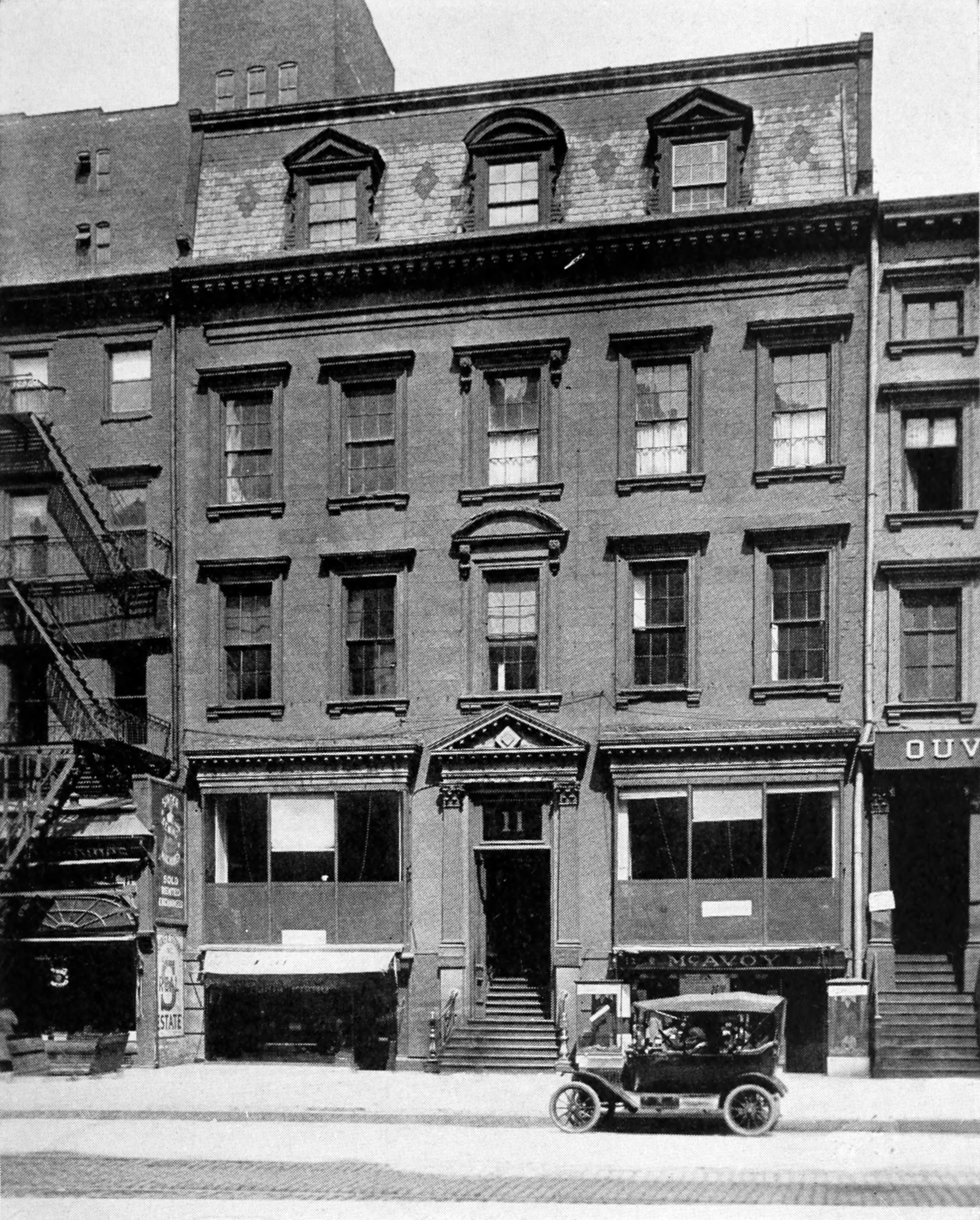
Biograph's Manhattan studio, where A Rude Hostess was filmed on March 3, 1909

== Cast ==
- Marion Leonard as Mrs. Leffingwell
- Arthur V. Johnson as the burglar
- Frank Powell as visitor
- Anita Hendrie as visitor
- Jeanie MacPherson as maid
- Owen Moore as Mrs. Leffingwell's butler or "footman"
- Mack Sennett as police officer

== Production ==
The screenplay for this short is credited to D. W. Griffith, who also directed the picture at Biograph's main studio, which in 1909 was located inside a large renovated brownstone mansion in New York City, in Manhattan, at 11 East 14th Street. At the time cast and crew were working on A Rude Hostess, Griffith had been directing Biograph productions at the Manhattan facility for almost exactly one year.

=== Filming ===
Filming A Rude Hostess was done at the Manhattan studio on a single interior set in just one day—on March 3, 1909—by Biograph cinematographer G. W. "Billy" Bitzer. In addition to summarizing this release's plot, the previously noted 1985 reference Early Motion Pictures: The Paper Print Collection in the Library of Congress provides a basic description of Bitzer's camerawork in shooting the production:

...The film ends as the police arrive and take the handsome burglar into custody. The camera moves to a semiclose-up of the hostess who is in hysterics at losing such a handsome boyfriend. All of the action occurred in one room and, with the exception of the camera movement at the end, was photographed from a single-camera position.

Bitzer collaborated with Griffith for many years, and his extensive experience behind the camera made him an expert at gauging not only the "screen presence" or photogenic qualities of actors but also, respectively, their strongest attributes on film. During the period when A Rude Hostess was being shot at the old Manhattan studio, Bitzer judged Marion Leonard to be "the best actress on the screen". He also ranked two of the actors in this short—"big, handsome" Arthur Johnson and Owen Moore—as Biograph's most dapper performers, "who looked great in costumes or dress suits", as in the formal "dinner clothes" worn by Johnson in this production.

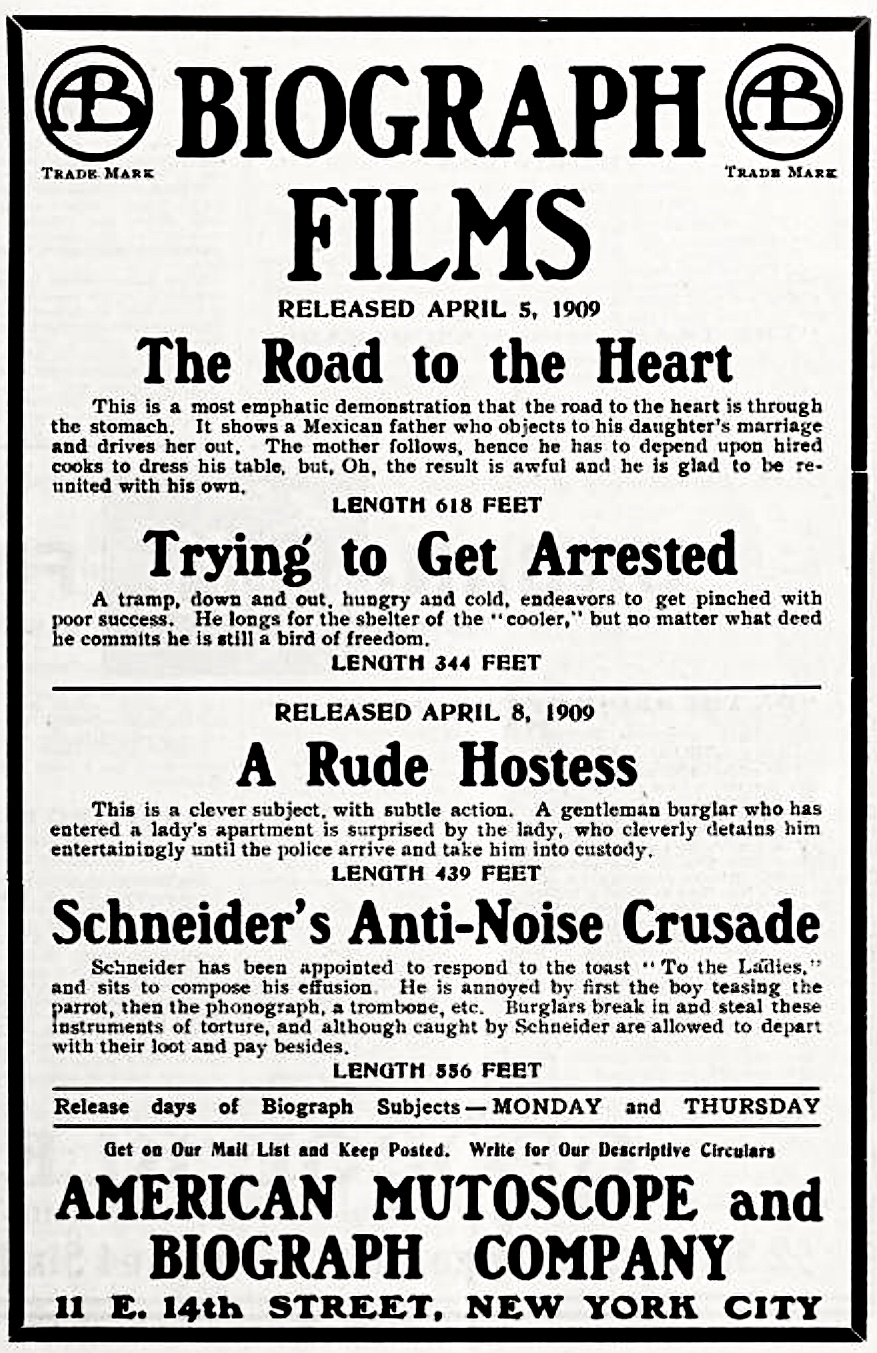
Biograph promotion for 1909 split-reel releases, including A Rude Hostess

=== "'Just grinding out sausages'" ===
The rapid pace of film production at Biograph by 1909 and the brief runtimes of those screen projects, in particular the six-to-seven-minute split-reel releases like A Rude Hostess, proved to be especially frustrating for Griffith, who often compared the repetitive split-reel process to the work of a sausage-maker. In fact, in the 1993 book The Films of D. W. Griffith published by Cambridge University Press, film historian Scott Simmon specifically includes A Rude Hostess in his discussions about the director's frustrations and his growing desire to create much longer, more visually complex motion pictures:

It is evident from this pace and from the films themselves that Griffith could not devote careful attention to each of his Biographs. Single-shot films like The Mexican Sweethearts or single-camera-position ones like A Rude Hostess merit little more than his "just grinding out sausages."...Taken as a whole, the surprise of Griffith's Biographs is not that the "masterpieces" outshine the "sausages" but that the level—at least the level of ambition—at which the great majority were produced was so high. (Note: Film historian Scott Simmon's quoted phrase "just grinding out sausages" is drawn from Griffith's own correspondence preserved in the D. W. Griffith Papers housed in the Museum of Modern Art (MOMA) in Manhattan, New York. See pages in Simmon's cited 1993 reference.)

=== Biograph's uncredited actors ===
Identifying cast members in many early Biograph releases such as A Rude Hostess is made more difficult by the fact that the studio, as a matter of company policy, did not begin publicly crediting its performers on screen, in film-industry publications, or in newspaper advertisements until almost exactly four years after this short's release. Marion Leonard and Arthur Johnson, although in starring roles in this short, were among the uncredited actors on Biograph's relatively small staff of "photoplayers" in 1909. In its April 5, 1913 issue, the Chicago-based trade journal Motography in a news item titled "Biograph Identities Revealed" announces that "at last" Biograph "is ready to make known its players." That news item also informs filmgoers that for the price of ten cents they can purchase a poster from Biograph on which the names and respective portraits of 26 of the company's principal actors were featured.

== Release and reception ==
The film and its split-reel companion Schneider's Anti-Noise Crusade circulated for many months to theaters throughout the country and were widely promoted in newspapers and trade publications. Shortly before the release of A Rude Hostess on April 8, 1909, an anonymous reviewer for The Moving Picture World in New York saw a preview of it and succinctly reported, "The subject is most cleverly acted and sumptuously staged." In Vermont, two months after the comedy's release, The Barre Daily Times agreed, describing it as "superbly mounted, effectively and powerfully acted."

Most published comments about A Rude Hostess and other printed references to the short in 1909 and during the first half of 1910 are not independent, non-biased assessments of the Biograph production; they are instead from newspaper advertisers or theater owners who simply had commercial interests in attracting audiences. In Brunswick, Georgia in the summer of 1909, the local newspaper promoted the picture's presentation at the town's Grand Theatre and reached for superlatives to praise its performers, declaring that the "acting in this picture is without doubt the most perfect ever seen in Brunswick." The Brunswick Daily News in its promotion also mentions a series of short stories written in 1898 by English author E. W. Hornung that likely inspired Biograph's 1909 screenplay, stories that center around the exploits of a gentleman thief. "'The [sic] Rude Hostess'", notes the newspaper in its August 5 issue, "is a reproduction of the famous story of Raffles, the amateur cracksman."

=== Outwitting "a rogue of the sterner sex" ===
Not all newspaper promotions for the film confined themselves to simple observations or advertising catchphrases about the comedy. Yet, there were some viewers of the short who offered more thoughtful opinions about the release, although those opinions too may have been imbedded with commercial motivations, namely in targeting a particular demographic. The same month, for example, that The Brunswick Daily News was commenting about the film in Georgia, more than 4,500 miles away, in the United States territory of Hawaii, theaters were already screening the short as well. In the August 30, 1909 issue of Honolulu's local newspaper, The Pacific Commercial Advertiser, the publication informs it readers about A Rude Hostess and other films being circulated between two theaters there, the Empire Theater and the Art Theater. The newspaper states in the cited issue that the Biograph comedy is one offering that will have special appeal for the theaters' female patrons. "Tonight", asserts The Pacific Commercial Advertiser, "there will be a couple of comedies that will shatter the seams of the dresses of the ladies who go to see them." The paper then alludes to the film's subtle messaging of portraying intellectual equality between the sexes and even hinting at the ongoing efforts by women to gain equal voting rights, adding "the Rude Hostess will bring to mind the claims of suffragettes." Elaborating on those points in promoting the short as a "ladies" comedy, the Honolulu newspaper in the same issue states:

The patrons of the Art Theater will find in the picture serial entitled, "The [sic] Rude Hostess," chosen for the feature of today's change of program, an exceedingly clever story and, incidentally, an illustration of how a smart and pretty woman can outwit a rogue of the sterner sex. The film is manufactured by the American Biograph Company, and if you pay proper attention, you will find that it will keep your mind so thoroughly engrossed that you will think that you are lost in the perusal of some good work of fiction. The various incidents are so absolutely realistic that they seem part of your own personal experience. The plot is not a complicated one, but nevertheless entertaining, and the setting perfection itself. You will make no mistake by visiting the Art Theater today....

== Preservation status ==
Photographic prints and a partial film copy of A Rude Hostess survive in the Library of Congress (LC)), which holds a 172-foot roll of paper images printed frame-by-frame directly from the comedy's original 35mm master negative. (Note: The original 172-foot paper contact print of A Rude Hostess preserved in the Library of Congress is numbered "FLA5680" in its film archive.) Submitted by Biograph to the United States government in 1909, shortly before the film's release, the roll is part of the original documentation required by federal authorities for motion picture companies to obtain copyright protection for their productions. While the LC's collection of paper print rolls are certainly not projectable, negative copies of the paper images were later made and transferred by archival staff onto modern polyester-based safety film stock. That negative footage was then used to produce positive prints for screening. All that work was performed during a comprehensive film-preservation project carried out in the 1950s and early 1960s by Kemp R. Niver and other LC staff, who restored more than 3,000 early paper rolls of images from the library's collection, transferring them to negative safety stock and many to positive prints.

== See also ==
- D. W. Griffith filmography
