= Tragic Love =

1909 film directed by D. W. Griffith

- Directed by: D. W. Griffith
- Written by: D. W. Griffith
- Starring: Arthur V. Johnson
- Cinematography: G. W. Bitzer; Arthur Marvin
- Release date: February 11, 1909
- Running time: 15 minutes (one reel)
- Country: United States
- Language: Silent

Tragic Love is a 1909 American silent short drama film directed by D. W. Griffith.

== Cast ==
- Arthur V. Johnson as Bob Spaulding
- David Miles as Mr. Rankin
- Linda Arvidson as Mrs. Rankin
- Charles Avery as In Factory
- Clara T. Bracy
- John R. Cumpson as Bartender
- George Gebhardt as First Thief / In Factory
- Robert Harron as Paper Boy
- Raymond Hatton as A Detective / In Factory (unconfirmed)
- Anita Hendrie as The Landlady / The Thieves' Accomplice / In Factory
- Charles Inslee as Second Thief
- Florence Lawrence as The Maid / In Factory
- Marion Leonard as In Factory
- Jeanie MacPherson
- Herbert Miles
- Mack Sennett as Bartender / Policeman / In Factory
- Harry Solter as In Factory
