= The Politician's Love Story =

- Directed by: D. W. Griffith
- Written by: D. W. Griffith
- Produced by: American Mutoscope and Biograph Company
- Starring: Mack Sennett; Marion Leonard
- Cinematography: Billy Bitzer; Arthur Marvin
- Distributed by: Biograph Company
- Release date: February 22, 1909
- Running time: 6 minutes
- Country: United States
- Language: Silent/English

The Politician's Love Story is a 1909 short drama film directed by D. W. Griffith for the Biograph Company.

== Cast ==
- Mack Sennett – Boss Tim Crogan
- Kathlyn Williams – Extra
- Lee Dougherty –
- Marion Leonard – Peter, Cartoonist
- Florence Lawrence –
- Herbert Prior – Crogan's Friend

uncredited

- Linda Arvidson – Woman, Third Couple
- George Gebhardt – Newspaper Employee
- D. W. Griffith – Man, First Couple
- Anita Hendrie – Woman, Fourth Couple
- Arthur V. Johnson – Newspaper Employee, Male, Third Couple
- Florence La Badie
- David Miles – Newspaper Employee, Man Fourth Couple
- Barry O'Moore – Newspaper Employee (*billed Herbert Yost)
- Alfred Paget

== See also ==
- D. W. Griffith filmography
