= A New Trick =

1909 film by D. W. Griffith

- Directed by: D. W. Griffith
- Production company: Biograph Company
- Release date: June 10, 1909
- Running time: 2 minutes
- Country: United States
- Language: Silent

A New Trick is a silent American crime comedy film directed and written by D. W. Griffith, released in 1909. A production of Biograph Company, the short film was distributed as a split reel with The Lonely Villa. Shot in Edgewater, New Jersey, the film starred Marion Leonard, Mack Sennett, Herbert Prior, and Arthur V. Johnson.

A 1909 article in The Monroe News-Star called A New Trick "one of the cleverest bits of comedy Biograph has yet turned out", describing it as "short and snappy".

== Plot ==
A woman walking in a park loses her wallet. A young man picks it up and refutes the woman's claim that he has the wallet. Two young men come by and promise they would help the woman regain her wallet. The two young men quickly arrange red paint and a knife. Using a shortcut in the park, they get in front of the thief and one of the boys lies on the ground with a paint-smeared knife. The other calls for help and hides. When the thief comes running and reaches the scene of the alleged murder, the second boy jumps out of hiding and accuses the thief of being the murderer. This forces the thief to empty his pockets; the stolen wallet comes to light and can be returned to its owner.
