= Schneider's Anti-Noise Crusade =

1909 film directed by D. W. Griffith

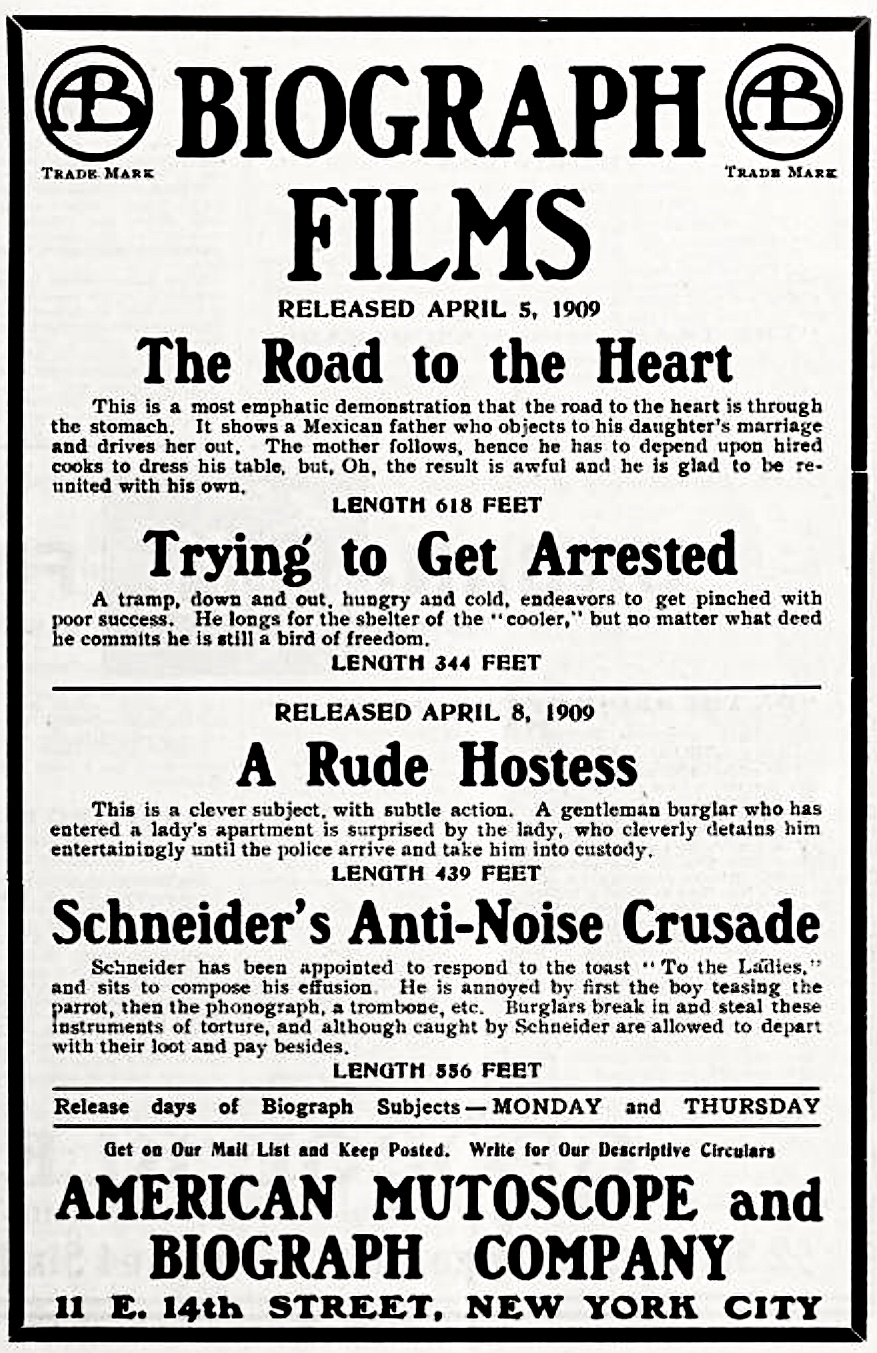
- A 1909 promotion of this comedy with other split-reel releases
- Directed by: D. W. Griffith
- Written by: D. W. Griffith
- Produced by: American Mutoscope and Biograph Company, Manhattan, New York
- Starring: John R. Cumpson; Florence Lawrence
- Cinematography: Arthur Marvin; G. W. Bitzer
- Release date: April 8, 1909
- Running time: 8-9 minutes, 556 feet (part of split-reel (Note: According to the reference How Movies Work by Bruce F. Kawin (New York: Macmillan Publishing Company, 1987, pp. 46-47), a full 1000-foot reel of film in the silent era had, on average, a maximum running time of 15 minutes. Also, silent films were generally projected at a "standard" speed of 16 frames per second, much slower than the 24 frames of later sound films.)
- Country: United States
- Language: Silent

Schneider's Anti-Noise Crusade is a 1909 American silent comedy film written and directed by D. W. Griffith, produced by the American Mutoscope and Biograph Company in New York City, and co-starring John R. Cumpson and Florence Lawrence. At its release in April 1909, the short was distributed to theaters on a "split reel", which was a single reel that accommodated more than one film. This short shared its reel with another Biograph comedy directed by Griffith, A Rude Hostess.

Original contact-print paper rolls of both motion pictures, as well as projectable safety-stock copies of them, are preserved in the Library of Congress.

== Plot ==
The film depicts the mounting frustrations experienced by Mr. Schneider, who is living with his wife in an apartment. There he is trying desperately to concentrate on writing a special composition or "poetic effusion" for his "Liederkranz" (choir) (Note: A Liederkranz is a German-language choir, formerly for men only.) while being repeatedly distracted and increasingly annoyed by activities and noises that surround him. He must cope with the rambunctious behavior of his young nephew Fritz playing a trombone, a squawking pet bird, a phonograph, and tolerate his wife and another musician practicing the violin. The following summary of the screenplay, which is from Kemp R. Niver's extensive 1985 reference Early Motion Pictures: The Paper Print Collection in the Library of Congress, provides additional details about the plot:

In this film, a woman (Florence Lawrence) married to a composer (John Cumpson) is visited by a large woman and her young son. After enthusiastic greetings, the composer goes back to work and the little boy begins to cause trouble. He teases the parrot until it screeches, plays the trombone, and otherwise disturbs the composer. This goes on until, late at night, the composer can be seen sitting up while the rest of the household sleeps. Two burglars enter, and the composer, pistol in hand, pays them to remove the various noise-making devices from the house. As an afterthought, he gives them the parrot in its cage. (Note: Another plot summary of the film can be found on page 412 in 3 April 1909 issue of The Moving Picture World.)

== Cast ==
- John R. Cumpson as Mr. Schneider
- Florence Lawrence as Mrs. Schneider
- Anita Hendrie as Lena, Mr. Schneider's sister
- Arthur V. Johnson as violinist
- Jeanie MacPherson as maid
- Owen Moore as first thief
- Herbert Prior as second thief
- Tony O'Sullivan in unverified role
- Clara T. Bracy as extra
- Flora French as extra
- Mack Sennett as extra

== Production ==
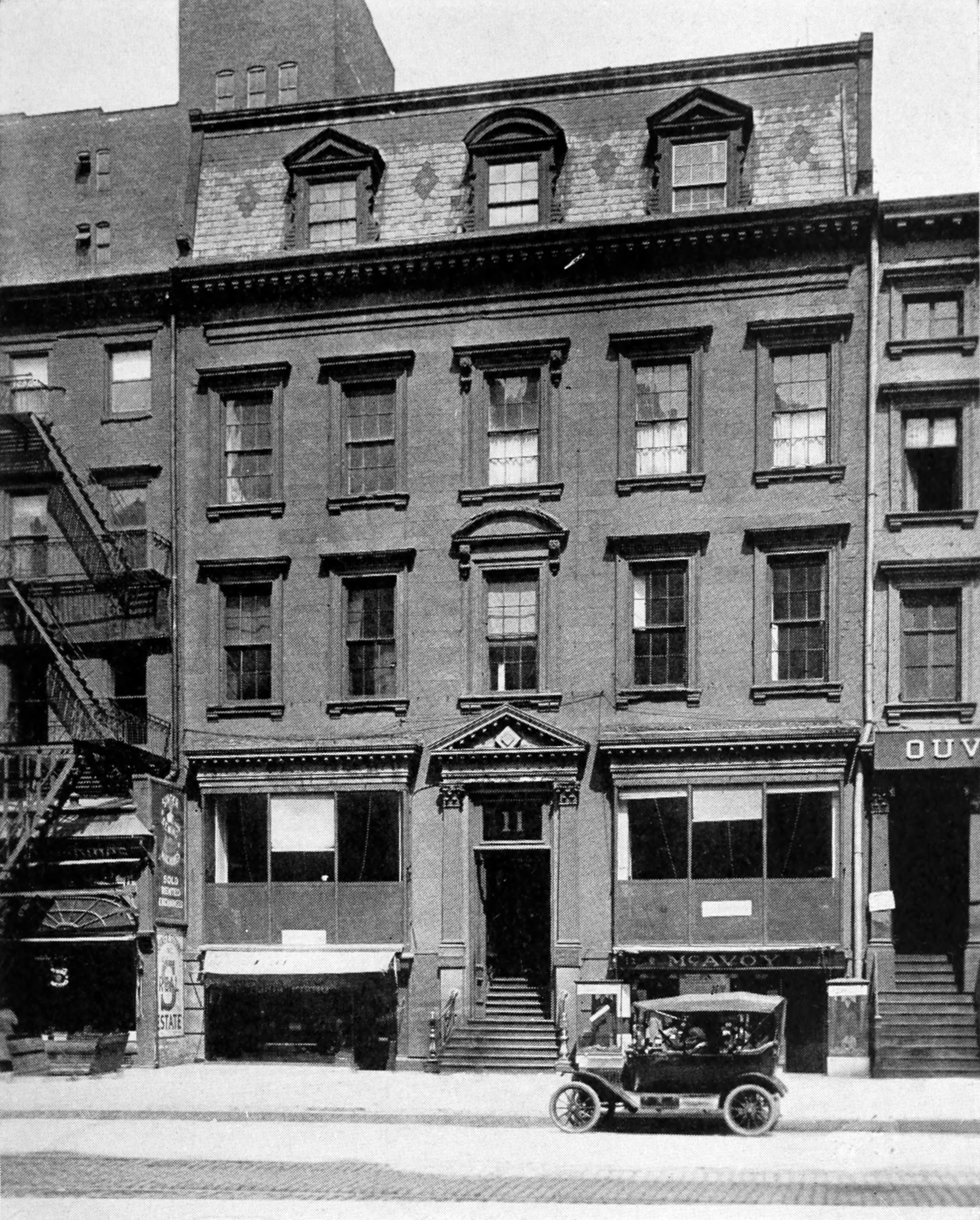
Biograph's Manhattan studio, where Schneider's Anti-Noise Crusade was filmed March 8–9, 1909

The screenplay for this short is credited to D. W. Griffith, who also directed the picture at Biograph's main studio, which in 1909 was located inside a large renovated brownstone mansion in New York City, in Manhattan, at 11 East 14th Street. The comedy was filmed there on interior sets in just two days—March 8 and 9, 1909—by Biograph cinematographers G. W. "Billy" Bitzer and his assistant Arthur Marvin.

=== Biograph's uncredited actors ===
Identifying cast members in early Biograph releases such as Schneider's Anti-Noise Crusade is made more difficult by the fact that the studio, as a matter of company policy, did not begin publicly crediting its performers on screen, in trade publications, or in newspaper advertisements until four years after this short's release. John R. Cumpson and Florence Lawrence, although co-stars in this short, were uncredited in their roles on screen and in print, as were the rest of Biograph's relatively small staff of "photoplayers" in the studio's productions in 1909. At that time, Lawrence was already gaining widespread celebrity among filmgoers. Few people, though, outside the motion picture industry knew her name, so the actress was referred to by admirers and in news publications as simply "the Biograph girl".

== Release and reception ==
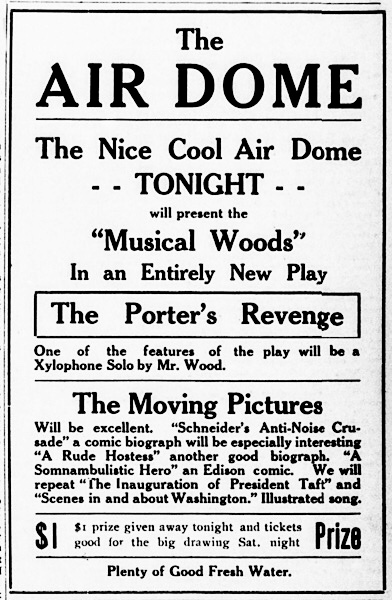
Newspaper ad for film at outdoor "Air Dome" theater in Conway, Arkansas, July 1909

After their release on April 8, 1909, Schneider's Anti-Noise Crusade and its split-reel companion A Rude Hostess circulated to theaters throughout the United States for the next year. The two shorts were widely promoted in newspapers and in film-industry publications. One unnamed reviewer for the New York journal The Moving Picture World evidently found Schneider's Anti-Noise Crusade to be refreshing and wholesome entertainment, describing it to readers as "a clean bit of comedy" and "a welcome relief from some of the inane things that pass for comedy."

In the months after the film's release, most published comments about the Biograph production are not independent, non-biased assessments; instead, they are from advertisers or theater owners who simply had commercial interests in attracting audiences. Also, to widen the appeal of vaudeville shows at the time, many theatres routinely presented several films or "photoplays" to complement the traditional offerings of live stage performances. The Courier-Journal in Louisville, Kentucky in its April 26, 1909 issue informs local residents that to mark the "second week of vaudeville" at the city's Hopkins Theatre, audiences could enjoy acts by sleight-of-hand artist "Professor Leo", a clog dancer, storytellers, and singers. The newspaper then states that "the moving pictures" being offered on the program "cover a wide range of interesting subjects", adding that "The leading funmaking film is one called 'Schneider's Anti-noise [sic] Crusade.'" At theatres elsewhere in 1909, the "especially interesting" comedy proved to be popular and continued to be featured and promoted as the lead film in variety shows.

== Preservation status ==
Photographic prints and a film negative and positive of Schneider's Anti-Noise Crusade survive in the Library of Congress (LC)), which holds a 206-foot roll of paper images printed frame-by-frame directly from the comedy's original 35mm master negative. (Note: The print of Schneider's Anti-Noise Crusade preserved in the Library of Congress is numbered "FLA5690"; the negative copy, "FRA2528".) Submitted by Biograph to the United States government in 1909, shortly before the film's release, the roll is part of the original documentation required by federal authorities for motion-picture companies to obtain copyright protection for their productions. While the LC's paper roll of the film is certainly not projectable, a negative copy of the roll's paper images was made and transferred onto modern polyester-based safety film stock to produce a positive print for screening. Those copies were made as part of a preservation project carried out during the 1950s and early 1960s by Kemp R. Niver and other LC staff, who restored more than 3,000 early paper rolls of film images from the library's collection and created safety-stock copies.

== See also ==
- D. W. Griffith filmography
