= Wilful Peggy =

1910 film directed by D. W. Griffith

- Directed by: D. W. Griffith
- Written by: Frank E. Woods
- Starring: Mary Pickford; Henry B. Walthall
- Cinematography: Billy Bitzer
- Production company: Biograph Company
- Release date: August 25, 1910 (U.S.)
- Running time: 13 minutes
- Country: United States
- Language: Silent (English intertitles)

Wilful Peggy is a 1910 American silent film directed by D. W. Griffith and starring Mary Pickford.

== Plot ==
Peggy is a feisty peasant girl who catches the eye of a wealthy lord. Enamored with her, he proposes, but she harshly refuses. Her mother pushes her into the marriage against her will. After their marriage, she makes a fool of herself among the socialites at her husband's party. In the height of her embarrassment, her husband's nephew convinces her to run away with him. She innocently agrees, but it soon becomes obvious what the nephew's true intentions were.

== Cast ==
- Mary Pickford as Peggy
- Clara T. Bracy as Peggy's Mother
- Henry B. Walthall as The Lord
