= The Honor of Thieves =

1909 film directed by D. W. Griffith

- Directed by: D. W. Griffith
- Written by: D. W. Griffith
- Starring: Florence Lawrence
- Cinematography: G. W. Bitzer
- Release date: January 11, 1909
- Running time: 11 minutes (one reel)
- Country: United States
- Language: Silent

The Honor of Thieves is a 1909 American silent short drama film directed by D. W. Griffith.

== Cast ==
- Florence Lawrence as Rachel Einstein
- Harry Solter as Mr. Einstein
- George Gebhardt as Musician
- Anita Hendrie as At Dance
- Arthur V. Johnson as Customer / Musician
- Wilfred Lucas
- David Miles as At Dance
- Owen Moore as Ned Grattan
- Frank Powell
- Mack Sennett as At Dance / Policeman
