= A Sound Sleeper =

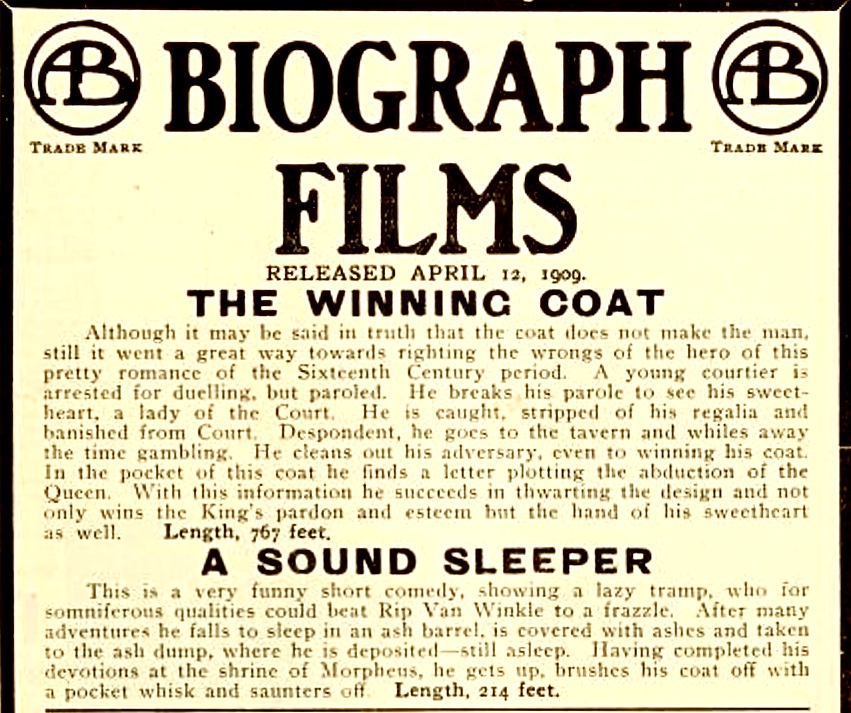
- Promotion for A Sound Sleeper on split reel with The Winning Coat, April 1909
- Directed by: D. W. Griffith
- Written by: D. W. Griffith
- Produced by: American Mutoscope and Biograph Company, Manhattan, New York
- Starring: Anthony O'Sullivan or John R. Cumpson
- Cinematography: G. W. Bitzer; Arthur Marvin
- Distributed by: American Mutoscope and Biograph Company
- Release date: April 12, 1909
- Running time: 1 reel, 214 feet (approximately 3 minutes, 20 seconds)
- Country: United States
- Language: Silent

A Sound Sleeper is a 1909 American comedy film directed by D. W. Griffith and produced by the American Mutoscope and Biograph Company. The short was filmed in one day in the Coytesville borough of Fort Lee, New Jersey, which at the time was a popular filming location for many early motion-picture studios in the northeastern United States. Due to the brief running time of this comedy, it was originally distributed in April 1909 on a split reel with another Biograph release, a longer dramatic film titled The Winning Coat.

No full original 35mm theatrical print of the comedy is known to exist; nor does a later copy transferred directly from original film stock survive in public archives or in private collections. This early Griffith work's existence is therefore cited as either lost or "unknown" in some printed and online film references. A visual record of the short, however, does exist. The record is preserved in the Library of Congress, which holds a 1909 non-projectable photographic copy of much of the film. Printed on a roll of paper 81-feet long, the copy was submitted by Biograph to the United States government shortly before the company released the film to theaters. The roll is part of the original documentation in Biograph's application to obtain a federal copyright on the production.

== Plot ==
As described in 1909 trade publications, this short's plot centers around a vagabond or "tramp" who wanders about town desperately seeking places to sleep. Finding locations to nap is actually easy for him since he possesses the ability to doze anywhere, even in the most uncomfortable, unsettled, and loudest situations. Whenever the tramp falls asleep, which occurs often, night and day, "an earthquake or cyclone couldn't arouse him." Overcome again one morning with the urge to doze, he lies down on a pile of lumber and uses a brick as a "pillow" for his head. He falls asleep, but soon a group of ruffians begin to argue nearby and start fighting. As their battle intensifies, some of the fighters "sprawl and tumble" all over the snoozing tramp; yet, he continues to sleep peacefully. Finally, the tramp awakes, gets up, and walks over to a large empty barrel labeled "'ashes'". He crawls inside the container and quickly lapses once more into a coma-like state. Almost immediately, as part of their daily routine, various housewives in the neighborhood approach the barrel and begin depositing into it bucketloads of ashes, the residue they have brought from their homes' stoves and fireplaces. The tramp is quickly and completely buried by the ashes, although he remains fast asleep. Next, a horse-drawn cart arrives and workmen pick up the full barrel and transport it with other trash to the town's dump. There they pour out the ashes and the sleeping tramp in a heap. He gradually awakes again, stands up, and casually brushes off his ash-covered clothing with a small broom he carries in his pocket. Then he calmly walks away from dump.

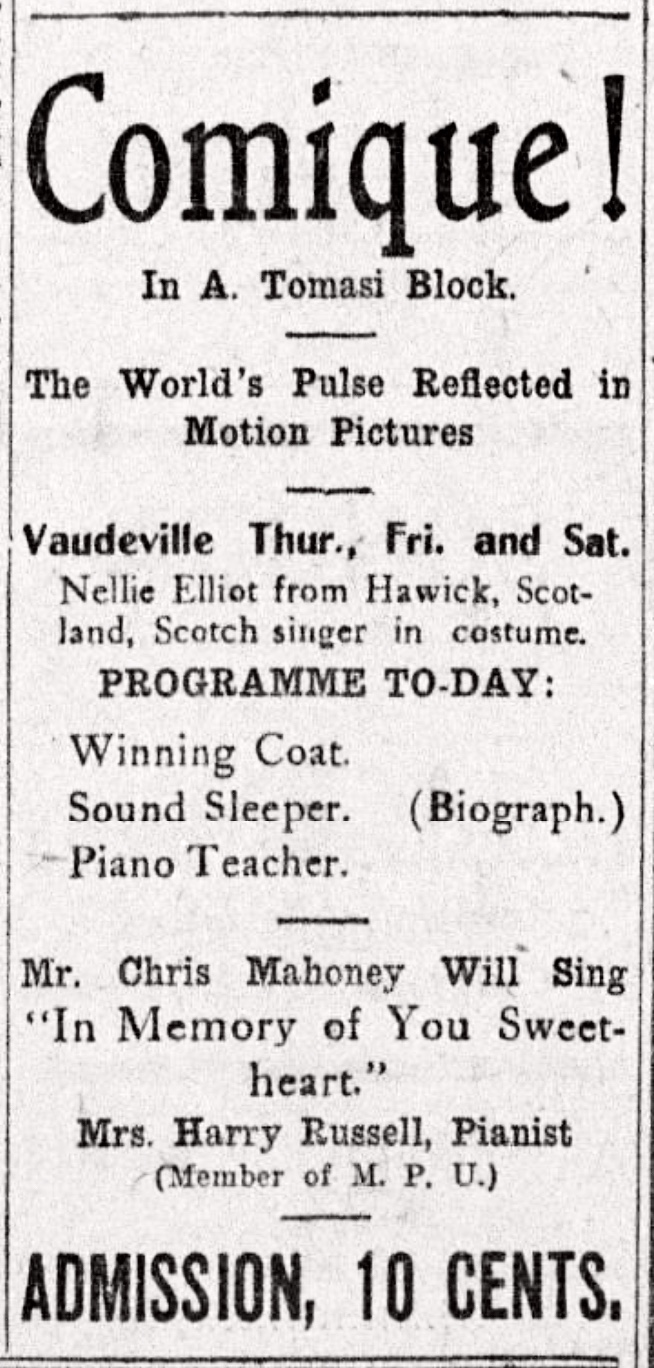
Newspaper ad for "[A] Sound Sleeper" in Barre, Vermont, June 12, 1909

== Cast ==
- Anthony O'Sullivan or John R. Cumpson as the sleepy tramp (Note: Various film references cite two different actors portraying the title character, an issue discussed under section "Cast-listing discrepancies".)
- Mack Sennett as a gentleman
- Herbert Prior as fighter
- Robert Harron as fighter
- Arthur V. Johnson as fighter
- Owen Moore as police officer
- Anita Hendrie as first "ash" woman
- Florence Lawrence as second "ash” woman
- Flora Finch as third "ash” woman
- Billy Quirk in undetermined role

== Production ==
The comedy was filmed in just one day, on March 18, 1909, in Fort Lee, New Jersey, then a popular filming location for various studios, especially for staging outdoor scenes. Fort Lee, which is situated just across the Hudson River from New York City, is approximately 13 miles from the site of Biograph's main studio facility in 1909, which was housed in a large converted brownstone mansion at 11 East 14th Street in Manhattan. On April 8, four days prior to its release, the one-reeler was copyrighted by Biograph and assigned the registration number H125502. That copyright protection expired long ago, so any surviving theatrical footage or photographic images created from that footage are in the public domain. Those materials would therefore be free for use without restrictions since they were produced and publicly exhibited in the United States prior to 1931.

=== Cast-listing discrepancies ===
At the time of this film's release, Biograph Studio was continuing its established policy of not crediting on screen or in published advertisements the names of the performers in its productions or even the name of Director Griffith himself. (Note: In the early 1900s, Biograph and other studios did not credit their performers, believing that the rising fame of identified actors would quickly raise the companies' casting budgets, preferring instead to employ an "anonymous labor pool". Also, early on in the film history of the United States, many established stage actors preferred to work in films anonymously in an effort to avoid the "embarrassment" of performing in motion pictures and diminishing the prospects of their theatre careers. See Jeanine Basinger's Silent Stars (Wesleyan University Press, 1999), p. 7.) That early policy explains why filmgoers in 1909 referred to one of the actors in this film, the rising star Florence Lawrence, as simply "The Biograph Girl". Publicly, few people knew her name then. In her 1925 autobiography When the Movies Were Young, Linda Arvidson–a fellow actress and the first wife of D. W. Griffith–recalls Lawrence's anonymity, "It was some time before the company allowed the names of actors to be given out, hence 'The Biograph Girl' was only the intelligent appellation."

Biograph's non-identification policy for its leading and supporting actors accounts for many cast discrepancies and omissions in motion-picture references regarding early silent productions, especially in the cases of lost films. A positive identification of the actor who portrayed the title character in A Sound Sleeper is clouded by conflicting citations in printed and online references. In some sources, Anthony O'Sullivan in cited as the sleepy tramp; in others, John R. Cumpson is credited in the lead. While O'Sullivan was a frequent performer for Biograph, the actor regarded in 1909 as Biograph's principal comedian among its company players was Cumpson. (Note: Some examples of the inconsistencies in cast listings can be seen at the following references: Griffith's filmography in the 1985 volume D. W. Griffith and the Biograph Company, the online catalog of the American Film Institute, the Internet Movie Database, and the online catalog of the Progressive Silent Film List.) Since Cumpson also received no screen credit in Biograph's films, he, like Florence Lawrence, was referred to generically as the studio's "funny man". In its April 17, 1909 issue, The Moving Picture World alludes only to the "Biograph funny man" in its brief description of the film's plot and its title character. That single allusion implies that Cumpson, not O'Sullivan, may have portrayed the "tramp".

== Release and reception ==
Given the brevity of this comedy, with a film length of just 214 feet and an original runtime of approximately three minutes, it was released and distributed by Biograph on a split reel, which was a single reel sent to theaters that held two or more entirely separate motion pictures. A Sound Sleeper on its reel accompanied another much longer Griffith film, a 767-foot drama set in sixteenth-century Europe, The Winning Coat. (Note: During the silent era, a "standard" reel could accommodate a little over 1000 feet of film. A full reel at that time also had a maximum running time between 15 and 16 minutes. While projection speeds differed at various cinemas in the silent period, especially in the early years, films were then, on average, projected at 16 frames per second. That speed was much slower than the 24 frames of later sound films. See How Movies Work by Bruce F. Kawin (New York: Macmillan Publishing Company, 1987, pp. 46-47).)

Biograph in its own published promotions of A Sound Sleeper refer to it simply as "a very funny short comedy"; yet, few impartial reviews or comments about the film can be found in either 1909 trade publications or in contemporary city or small-town newspapers. A production so brief would hardly warrant considerable treatments or even marginal assessments by film-industry observers or theater owners. Alfred Greason, writing for Variety under the pen name "Rush", did question the entertainment value of the film, given its relatively meager content as a "'filler'". In the trade paper's April 10, 1909 issue, Greason implies in his comments about the film that a substantial amount of footage from the production was cut and omitted from the picture so the comedy would be short enough to fit on a split-reel with The Winning Coat:

In its original form this Biograph subject might have been an amusing comedy. It is here a short "filler," and the value is lost through failure sufficiently to develop and work it up.

The Moving Picture World also had few comments as well about the comedy, stating only that its humor was "far fetched" and that the film was an example of Biograph's "pointless jokes" in its regular releases.

== Library of Congress paper print ==
No original projectable prints or original stills of A Sound Sleeper are preserved in any major motion-picture archive, including the Library of Congress, the UCLA Film Archives, in the collection of moving images at the Museum of Modern Art, the George Eastman Museum, or in any European film repositories. No film copy is also known to exist in any smaller public repositories or in private collections. This early Griffith production is therefore currently classified as lost. All of the original master negatives and prints were likely destroyed over time in various ways. Some copies may have been deliberately or inadvertently discarded; others, improperly stored or consumed in fires; while other copies, probably the vast majority, were ruined as the highly unstable nitrocellulose film stock on which this comedy was recorded steadily disintegrated.

The Library of Congress (LOC) does, though, hold an 81-foot roll of paper images printed frame—by-frame directly from the film's original 35mm master negative. While the library's paper print record is not projectable, such paper copies can be transferred onto modern safety film stock for screening. In fact, during the 1950s and early 1960s, Kemp R. Niver and other LOC staff restored more than 3,000 early films from the library's paper-print collection. The UCLA Film & Television Archive, for example, has in its collection such a reproduction, but not one of A Sound Sleeper. Instead, it is a copy of the first film directed by D. W. Griffith, the short Adventures of Dollie. That projectable reproduction was created from a copy of the LOC's paper print of that 1908 film. Currently, no such transfer to film has been done for A Sound Sleeper.
