= The Salvation Army Lass =

1909 film directed by D. W. Griffith

- Directed by: D. W. Griffith
- Written by: D. W. Griffith
- Starring: Florence Lawrence
- Cinematography: G. W. Bitzer; Arthur Marvin
- Release date: March 11, 1909
- Running time: 15 minutes (one reel)
- Country: United States
- Language: Silent

The Salvation Army Lass is a 1909 American silent short drama film directed by D. W. Griffith.

== Cast ==
- Florence Lawrence as Mary Wilson
- Harry Solter as Bob Walton
- Charles Inslee as Harry Brown
- Charles Avery
