= The Renunciation =

1909 film directed by D. W. Griffith

- PLAY film; runtime 00:12:04.
- Directed by: D. W. Griffith
- Written by: D. W. Griffith
- Produced by: Biograph Company; New York City
- Starring: Mary Pickford
- Cinematography: Billy Bitzer; Arthur Marvin
- Distributed by: Biograph Company
- Release date: July 19, 1909
- Running time: 14–15 minutes (1 reel; original release length 982 feet)
- Country: United States
- Language: Silent (English intertitles)

The Renunciation is a 1909 silent short film directed by D. W. Griffith and starring Mary Pickford. It was produced and distributed by the Biograph Company.

== Cast ==
- Mary Pickford as Kittie Ryan
- Anthony O'Sullivan as Steve Ryan, Kittie's Uncle
- James Kirkwood as Joe Fielding
- Harry Solter as Sam Walters
- Billy Quirk as Kittie's Fiance
- Edwin August
- Arthur V. Johnson
- Wilfred Lucas
- W. Chrystie Miller
