= Love Finds a Way =

1909 film directed by D. W. Griffith

- Directed by: D. W. Griffith
- Written by: D. W. Griffith
- Starring: Anita Hendrie
- Cinematography: G. W. Bitzer; Arthur Marvin
- Release date: January 11, 1909
- Running time: 5 minutes (one reel)
- Country: United States
- Language: Silent

Love Finds a Way is a 1909 American silent short drama film directed by D. W. Griffith.

== Plot ==
The Duke's daughter loves a knight, but her father intends for her to marry another man. To prevent the unwanted marriage, the knight and his friends abduct the intended bridegroom. With the help of a court barber, the knight disguises himself as the bridegroom and takes his place at the altar, marrying the Duke's daughter before the deception is discovered.

== Cast ==
- Anita Hendrie as The Duchess
- Arthur V. Johnson as The Duke
- Marion Leonard as Their Daughter
- Harry Solter as One of the Daughter's Suitors
- Charles Inslee as One of the Daughter's Suitors
- Linda Arvidson as Lady-in-Waiting
- Charles Avery as Plotter
- John R. Cumpson as Footman
- George Gebhardt as Plotter
- David Miles as Minister
- Mack Sennett as Footman
- Charles West
- Dorothy West as Lady-in-Waiting
