= A Burglar's Mistake =

1909 film directed by D. W. Griffith

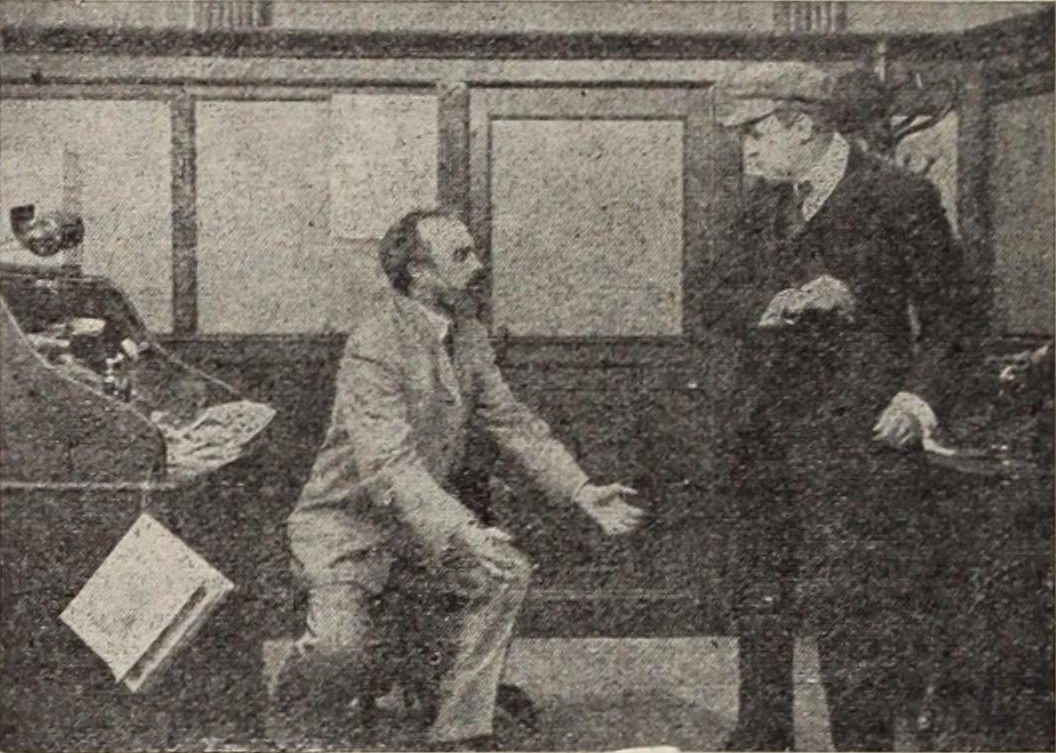
- Directed by: D. W. Griffith
- Written by: D. W. Griffith
- Starring: Harry Solter
- Cinematography: G. W. Bitzer; Arthur Marvin
- Distributed by: Biograph Company
- Release date: March 25, 1909
- Running time: 15 minutes (one reel)
- Country: United States
- Language: Silent

A Burglar's Mistake is a 1909 American silent short drama film directed by D. W. Griffith. The film was released on March 25, 1909, by Biograph Company and was met with liked viewers. The film is presumed lost.

== Cast ==
- Harry Solter as Henry Newman
- Charles Inslee as Dick Folsom
- Marion Leonard as Mrs. Newman
- Adele DeGarde as One of the Children
- Robert Harron as The Messenger
- Raymond Hatton as At Folsom's / Secretary (unconfirmed)
- Arthur V. Johnson as Policeman
- David Miles as At Folsom's
- Owen Moore as At Folsom's
- Herbert Prior as Policeman
- Gertrude Robinson as One of the Children
- Mack Sennett as At Folsom's / Policeman
- Dorothy West as One of the Children

== Reception ==
The film played alongside D. W. Griffith's 1909 film, Trying to Get Arrested at the Royal Theater in Bisbee, Arizona where it was praised in the local newspaper by the Royal's owner, who stated it was "one of the most intense drama's ever staged."
