= The Prussian Spy =

1909 film directed by D. W. Griffith

- Directed by: D. W. Griffith
- Written by: D. W. Griffith
- Starring: Marion Leonard
- Cinematography: G. W. Bitzer
- Release date: March 1, 1909
- Running time: 5 minutes (one reel)
- Country: United States
- Language: Silent

The Prussian Spy is a 1909 American silent short drama film directed by D. W. Griffith.

== Cast ==
- Marion Leonard as Lady Florence
- Harry Solter as Count Lopes
- Owen Moore as The Spy
- Arthur V. Johnson as Soldier
- Florence Lawrence as The Maid
- David Miles as Soldier
- Mack Sennett as Soldier
