= The Sacrifice (1909 film) =

1909 film directed by D. W. Griffith

- Directed by: D. W. Griffith
- Written by: D. W. Griffith
- Based on: "The Gift of the Magi" by O. Henry
- Starring: Harry Solter
- Cinematography: G. W. Bitzer
- Release date: January 14, 1909
- Running time: 7 minutes (one reel)
- Country: United States
- Language: Silent

The Sacrifice is a 1909 American silent short drama film directed by D. W. Griffith.

== Cast ==
- Harry Solter as Mr. Hardluck
- Florence Lawrence as Mrs. Hardluck
- Linda Arvidson as At Wigmakers
- John R. Cumpson as At Jewelers
- George Gebhardt as At Jewelers / At Pawnshop
- Arthur V. Johnson as At Wigmakers
- Marion Leonard as At Wigmakers
- Owen Moore
- Mack Sennett as At Wigmakers / At Jewelers / At Pawnshop
