= The Welcome Burglar =

1909 film directed by D. W. Griffith

- Directed by: D. W. Griffith
- Written by: D. W. Griffith
- Starring: Marion Leonard
- Cinematography: G. W. Bitzer
- Release date: January 25, 1909
- Running time: 13 minutes (one reel)
- Country: United States
- Language: Silent

The Welcome Burglar is a 1909 American silent short drama film directed by D. W. Griffith.

== Cast ==
- Marion Leonard as Alice Pierce
- Harry Solter as Ben Harris
- Charles Inslee as Employer / Husband
- Linda Arvidson as The Maid
- Edwin August
- Edward Dillon
- George Gebhardt as In Office / Burglar
- Robert Harron as Messenger
- Anita Hendrie as In Office
- Arthur V. Johnson as In Office / In Bar
- David Miles as In Office / Bartender
- Owen Moore as In Office / In Bar
- Mack Sennett as The Butler
