= The Wooden Leg =

1909 film directed by D. W. Griffith

- Directed by: D. W. Griffith
- Written by: D. W. Griffith
- Starring: David Miles
- Cinematography: G. W. Bitzer; Arthur Marvin
- Release date: March 8, 1909
- Running time: 3 minutes (one reel)
- Country: United States
- Language: Silent

The Wooden Leg is a 1909 American silent short comedy film directed by D. W. Griffith.

== Cast ==
- David Miles as Harry
- Florence Lawrence as Claire
- John R. Cumpson as Father
- Arthur V. Johnson as Boyfriend
- Mack Sennett as Tramp
