= The Gibson Goddess =

1909 film directed by D. W. Griffith

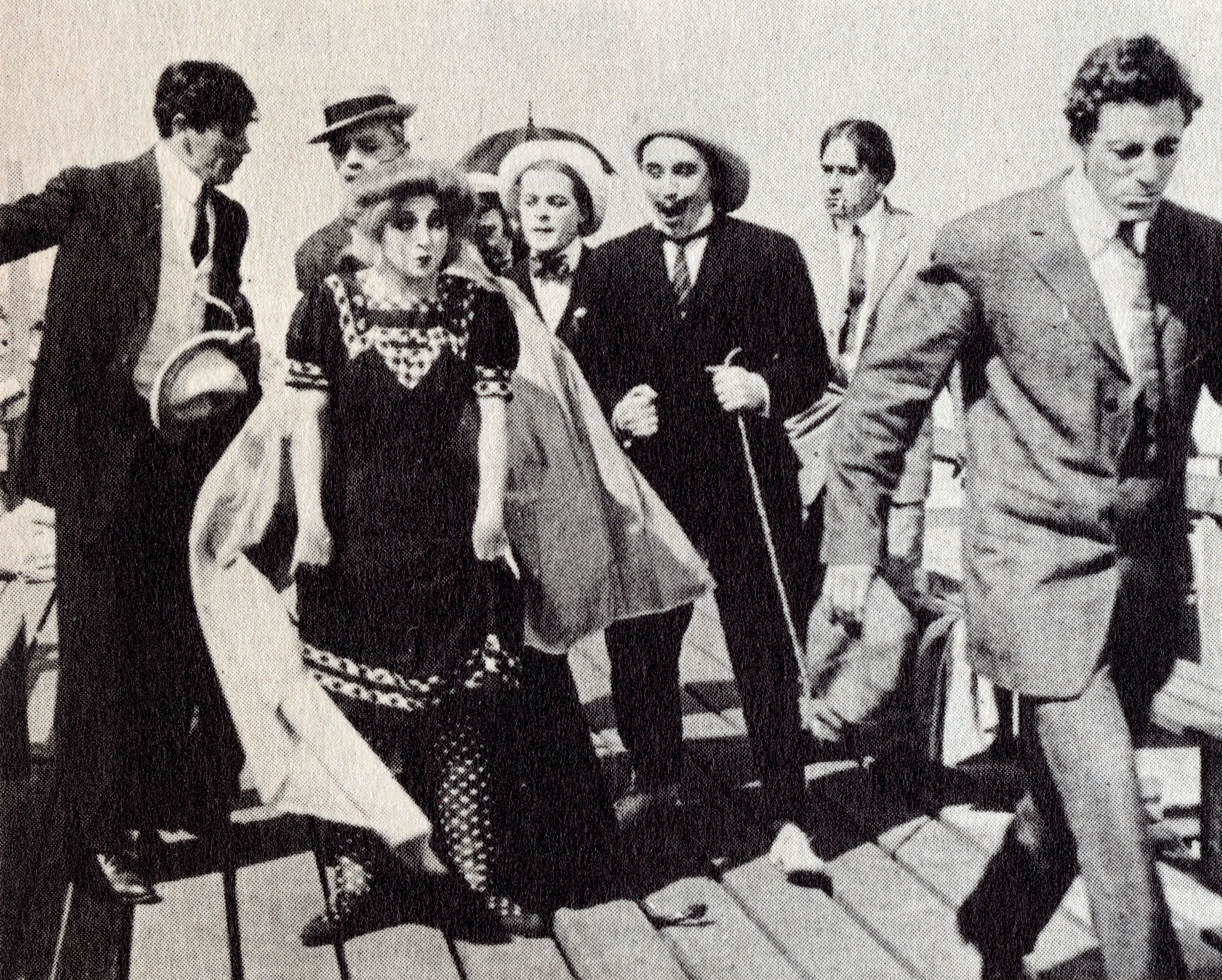
- Directed by: D. W. Griffith
- Written by: D. W. Griffith
- Produced by: American Mutoscope and Biograph Company
- Starring: Marion Leonard
- Cinematography: Billy Bitzer
- Distributed by: Biograph Company
- Release date: November 1, 1909
- Running time: 6 minutes
- Country: United States
- Language: Silent (English intertitles)

The Gibson Goddess is a 1909 short comedy film directed by D. W. Griffith. It stars Marion Leonard.

== Plot ==
The Gibson Goddess (1909)

Nanette Ranfrea, a young woman known for her beauty, decides to take a break from high society and spend the summer at a quiet seaside resort. She hopes the simpler setting will give her a rest from constant attention. Traveling with only her maid, she tries to stay unnoticed, but her looks quickly attract a crowd of admirers. The local women, feeling ignored, grow jealous.

Nanette soon becomes overwhelmed. She cannot go for a walk or sit in the park without being followed by groups of men. Tired of the attention, she hides in her room. Her maid comes up with a plan. She dresses Nanette in an unflattering bathing outfit, including oversized stockings stuffed with cotton, which make her look awkward and strange.

Most of the men leave in embarrassment, but Commodore Fitzmaurice, who is not fooled or frightened, stays. Nanette is touched by his kindness. When the others find out it was a trick, they are embarrassed. The local women, no longer interested in them, turn cold. In the end, Nanette chooses Fitzmaurice.

== Cast ==
- Marion Leonard as Nanette Ranfrea
- Kate Bruce on sidewalk
- Arthur V. Johnson as an admirer
- James Kirkwood as admirer
- George Nichols as manager of beach house
- Anthony O'Sullivan as Commodore Fitzmaurice
- Mary Pickford on sidewalk
- Billy Quirk as an admirer
- Gertrude Robinson on sidewalk
- Mack Sennett as an admirer
- J. Waltham as an admirer
- Dorothy West as a maid
