= The Girls and Daddy =

1909 film directed by D. W. Griffith

- Directed by: D. W. Griffith
- Written by: D. W. Griffith
- Starring: David Miles
- Cinematography: G. W. Bitzer; Arthur Marvin
- Release date: February 1, 1909
- Running time: 15 minutes (one reel)
- Country: United States
- Language: Silent

The Girls and Daddy is a 1909 American silent short drama film directed by D. W. Griffith with Griffith appearing in a small blackface role. A print of the film exists in the film archive of the Library of Congress.

== Cast ==
- David Miles as Dr. Payson
- Florence Lawrence as Dr. Payson's First Daughter
- Dorothy West as Dr. Payson's Second Daughter
- Florence Barker
- Dorothy Bernard
- Clara T. Bracy
- Kate Bruce
- John R. Cumpson as At Black & Tan Ball
- Gladys Egan
- Charles Gorman
- D. W. Griffith as At Black & Tan Ball
- Robert Harron as Messenger
- Anita Hendrie as In Post Office
- Charles Inslee as Burglar
- Arthur V. Johnson as At Black & Tan Ball / Policeman
- Marion Leonard as At Black & Tan Ball
- Wilfred Lucas
- Gertrude Robinson as On Street
- Mack Sennett as At Black & Tan Ball / Policeman
- Harry Solter
