= The Violin Maker of Cremona =

1909 American silent film by D. W. Griffith

- Complete film
- Directed by: D. W. Griffith
- Written by: François Coppée (story); Frank E. Woods
- Produced by: Biograph Company
- Starring: Herbert Prior; Mary Pickford; Owen Moore
- Cinematography: G. W. Bitzer
- Distributed by: Biograph Company
- Release date: June 7, 1909
- Running time: 15 minutes (1 reel, release length 963 feet)
- Country: United States
- Language: Silent (English intertitles)

The Violin Maker of Cremona is a 1909 silent film drama short directed by D. W. Griffith and starring Herbert Prior and Mary Pickford. It was produced and distributed by the Biograph Company.

The same story was filmed again in 1910 by Pathé.

== Cast ==
- Herbert Prior as Taddeo Ferrari
- Mary Pickford as Giannina, Taddeo's daughter
- Owen Moore as Sandro
- David Miles as Filippo, the cripple
- Harry Solter as the judge
- Marion Leonard as the judge's companion

Uncredited

- Charles Avery as a worker
- Clara T. Bracy
- John R. Cumpson
- Arthur V. Johnson
- Violet Mersereau
- Anthony O'Sullivan
- Mack Sennett
