= Leather Stocking =

- Directed by: D. W. Griffith
- Written by: D. W. Griffith
- Release date: September 27, 1909
- Running time: 11 minutes
- Country: United States
- Language: Silent

Leather Stocking is a 1909 American silent short drama film directed by D. W. Griffith, adapted from James Fenimore Cooper's 1826 novel The Last of the Mohicans.

== Cast ==
- George Nichols as the colonel
- Mack Sennett
- Marion Leonard as one of the colonel's nieces
- Linda Arvidson as one of the colonel's nieces
- Owen Moore
