= A Rural Elopement =

1909 film directed by D. W. Griffith

- Directed by: D. W. Griffith
- Written by: D. W. Griffith
- Starring: Linda Arvidson
- Cinematography: G. W. Bitzer
- Release date: January 14, 1909
- Running time: 9 minutes (one reel)
- Country: United States
- Language: Silent

A Rural Elopement is a 1909 American silent short drama film directed by D. W. Griffith.

== Cast ==
- Linda Arvidson as Cynthia Stebbins
- George Gebhardt as Hank Hopkins
- Harry Solter as Hungry Henry
- David Miles as Dad Stebbins
- John R. Cumpson as In Crowd
- Guy Hedlund
- Marion Leonard as In Crowd
- Owen Moore as In Crowd
- Mack Sennett as In Crowd
