= Fools of Fate =

1909 film directed by D. W. Griffith

- Directed by: D. W. Griffith
- Written by: Frank E. Woods
- Starring: James Kirkwood
- Cinematography: G. W. Bitzer
- Distributed by: Biograph Company
- Release date: October 7, 1909
- Running time: 11 minutes
- Country: United States
- Language: Silent with English intertitles

Fools of Fate is a 1909 American drama film directed by D. W. Griffith. A print of the film survives at the film archive of the Library of Congress.

== Plot ==
A man's boat capsizes and another man who was camping nearby saves him before he drowns. After that the rescuer meets the almost drown man's wife without knowing who she is, they become friends but he starts to have feelings for her.

== Cast ==
- James Kirkwood as Ben Webster
- Marion Leonard as Fanny Webster
- Frank Powell as Ed Hilton
- Henry B. Walthall
- William Beaudine as Extra (uncredited)

== See also ==
- List of American films of 1909
- 1909 in film
- D. W. Griffith filmography
