= The Song of the Shirt (film) =

1908 film directed by D. W. Griffith

- Play film; runtime 00:07:27.
- Directed by: D. W. Griffith
- Written by: D. W. Griffith; Thomas Hood (poem); Frank E. Woods
- Starring: Linda Arvidson
- Cinematography: G. W. Bitzer
- Release date: November 17, 1908
- Running time: 10 minutes (1 reel, release length 638 feet)
- Country: United States
- Language: Silent

The Song of the Shirt is a 1908 American silent drama film directed by D. W. Griffith. A partial print of the short exists in the film archive of the Library of Congress.

== Cast ==
- Linda Arvidson as Dying Woman
- George Gebhardt as In Office / Waiter
- Robert Harron as Stock Boy
- Arthur V. Johnson as Waiter
- Florence Lawrence as Woman
- Alfred Paget
- Mack Sennett as Foreman / In Office / In Second Restaurant
- Harry Solter as Employer / In Second Restaurant
