= The Voice of the Violin (film) =

1909 film directed by D. W. Griffith

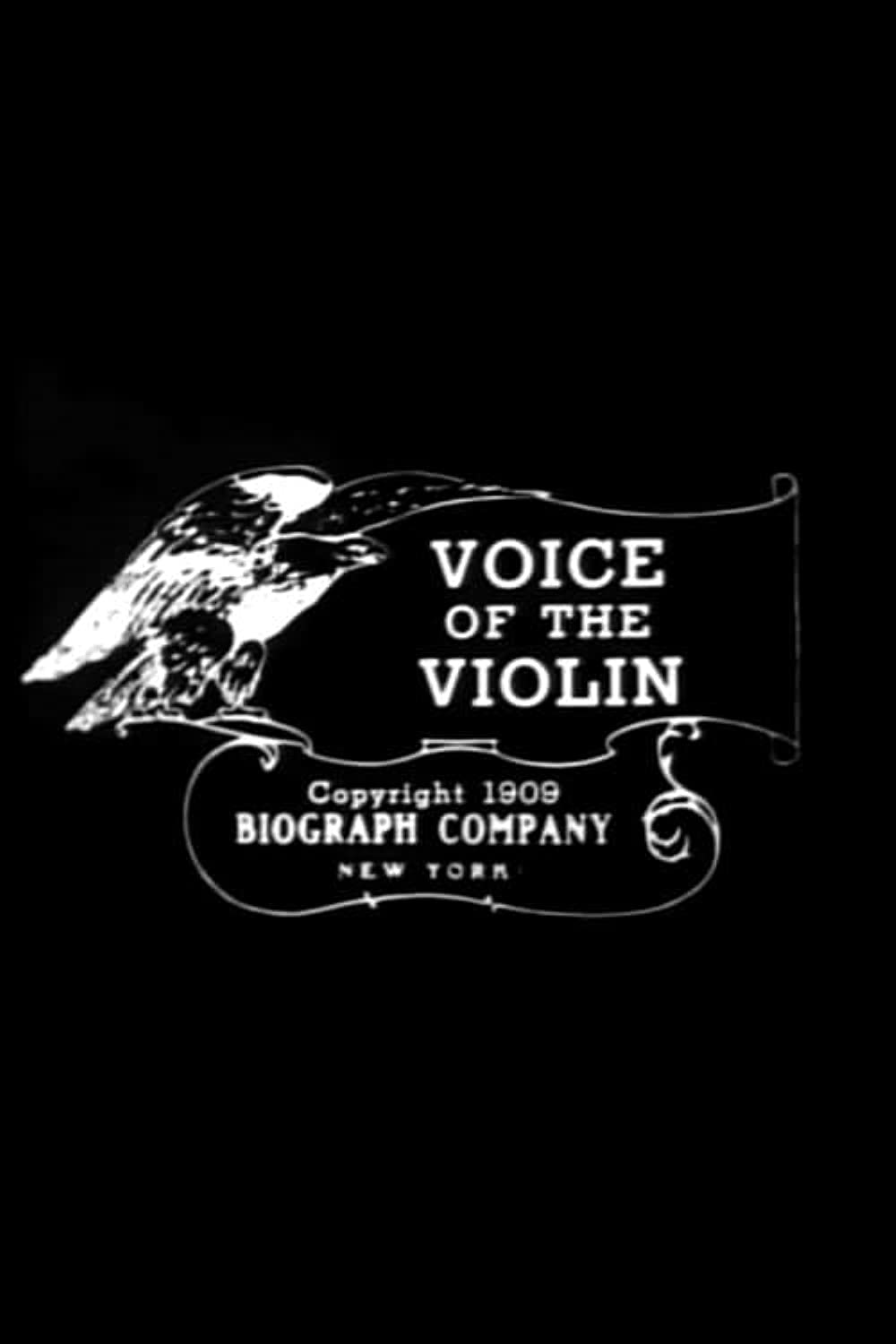
- Directed by: D. W. Griffith
- Written by: D. W. Griffith
- Starring: Arthur V. Johnson; Marion Leonard
- Cinematography: G. W. Bitzer, Arthur Marvin
- Production company: Biograph Company
- Distributed by: Biograph Company
- Release date: March 18, 1909
- Running time: 16 minutes
- Countries: United States, filmed in West 12th Street, Manhattan, New York, USA
- Language: Silent

The Voice of the Violin is a 1909 American silent short drama film directed by D. W. Griffith. It is preserved from a paper print at the Library of Congress and a 35 mm print at the George Eastman Museum. Arthur V. Johnson is a musician, who makes a living with classes of violin. He and his student Marion Leonard like each other a lot, but she rejects him for being too poor for her. He then decides to join a communist group and fight for equality of all. Right away, he draws a lot to plant the next bomb in a rich man's house. With the plot under way, he realizes that this is the home of his love interest, and he desperately tries to prevent the bomb from exploding.

== Distinguishing features and curiosities ==
- The ideological profile is clearly visible.
- There is still theatricality and succession of shots without complicated montages or variety of shots, but you can already notice the melodramatism that will be present in Griffith's films.
- In all the shots, there is a white circle in which AB appears as a copyright. AB for American Biograph. This was to avoid piracy or illegal reproductions.
- The editing is already fluid, the staging is not abandoned to the theatrical scene, yet there is no variation of different planes.
- The film was shot within two days.
- Characters extending their hands up and down: it means that they seek a world of equality, without upper and lower classes.
- Presence of the individual hero as the narrative engine (a characteristic of American cinema) which also means liberalism against institutions (collective in this case). Characters face extraordinary situations and become heroes.
- With respect to the previous films of the director, it has a more elaborate plot. It is the story of an immigrant who wants to integrate into American society. The conflict embodied in the film is the struggle between the rich (the good guys) and the anarchists/marxists (the bad guys). When it comes to categorizing the spaces and characters, we already see a clear distinction between the good guys and the bad guys. The good guys represent the American order and the capitalist system, so they live in big and luxurious houses; the bad guys represent the anti-American and therefore wear old clothes and live underground in old spaces. The moral is that the hero always ends up winning, as the fiddler ultimately integrates into capitalist American society.
- The hero integrates in highest society based on a lie, as he presents himself as a hero without more and does not give himself away as a crony of the other side.

== Cast ==
- Arthur V. Johnson - Herr von Schmidt
- Marion Leonard - Helen Walker
- Frank Powell - Mr. Walker
- David Miles - Communist Leader

uncredited

- Linda Arvidson - At Party
- Clara T. Bracy
- John R. Cumpson - At Party
- Adele DeGarde - At Party
- Gladys Egan
- Anita Hendrie - Maid
- Owen Moore - Servant
- Tom Moore - Servant
- George Nichols
- Herbert Prior - At Party, Servant
- Mack Sennett - At Party
- Dorothy West - At Party

== Plot ==
Copy of the film

A novel about a poor German music teacher. Herr von Schmitt, a young musician, came to USA country from Germany and makes his living teaching violin. At home he was imbued with the doctrines of Karl Marx, a propagandist for the communist principles of socialism. Von Schmitt, however, having succeeded moderately in providing comfort with his art, gradually wears away his former greedy spirit and listens to the persuasive arguments of his former companions. Among his pupils is Miss Helen Walker, daughter of a wealthy capitalist. A strong friendship develops between the teacher and the pupil, which develops into love. Von Schmitt, unable to contain himself any longer, confesses his love during a lesson in his studio, but is rejected because of the difference in class. Angered by this state of affairs, he listens to the arguments of his anarchist friends and becomes one of them. At one of the meetings, a drawing takes place to select the assassins of a certain monopolist, whose name he does not know. The protagonist is chosen as one of two to do the job. Armed with a bomb, they go to a house, a mansion in an upscale area of town, and while one goes into the basement to plant the bomb, Von Schmitt stays outside to watch. At this time, the melody of his own violin composition floats in the night air, and as he walks up to the porch, he peeks out the window and sees Helen playing her violin. The hero realizes that this is her home; he never knew it, since she always came to his studio for lessons. He must save her. Rushing to the basement, he discovers that his companion has set a bomb and has already lit the fuse. He begs him to stop, but to no avail. To his entreaty the latter replies: "Remember your oath." "To perdition such oaths, whence they come!" - And seizing him, a struggle ensues. The accomplice succeeds in overpowering him and, having bound him hand and foot, leaves him to perish with the others. With a supernatural effort, he crawls to the bomb and with his teeth bites the fuse in two as the flames are a few inches from the bomb. Calling for help, he summons the housemates, who free him. All ends well and the beloved's father allows the couple to be together.

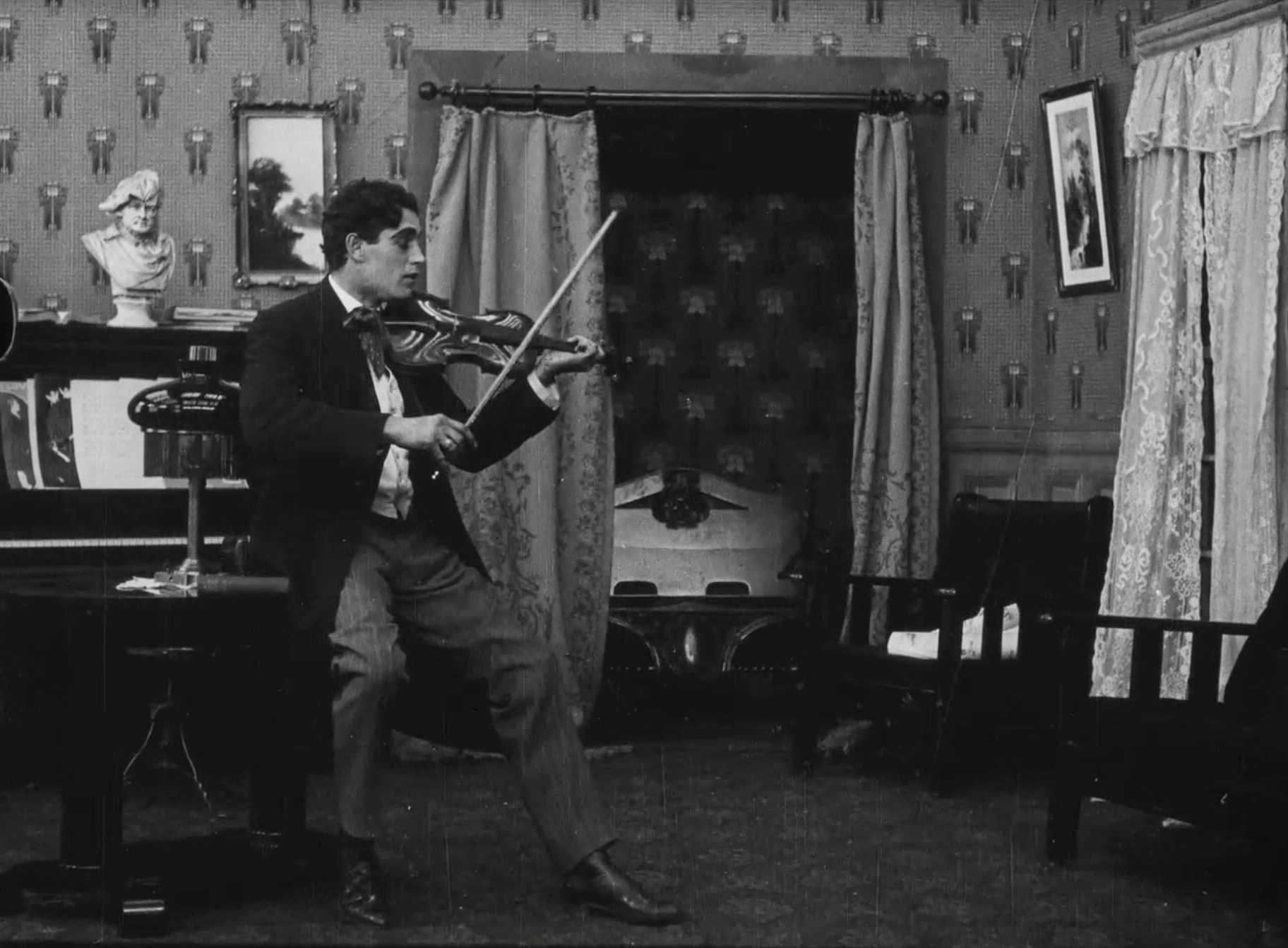

== D.W. Griffith ==
- He builds an ideology of American cinema. Ideology: vindication of the homeland, American values, formation of a political being, values of democracy. He is the creator of this ideology.
- Creator of the American industry, Hollywood. He manages to involve big banks and big financiers in the production of blockbusters, his fundamental feature films ("The Birth of a Nation", "Intolerance (film)"). These two films mark the beginning of American films as we know them today.
- These films mark the beginning of the feature film as a constituent element of the cinematic spectacle.

D.W. Griffith is the fundamental figure of cinema, creator of the story and the film industry in addition to the "star system" (he created celebrities) and the public in the cinema (he made the bourgeoisie go to the movies and the public went from being lower classes to everyone). Before him, cinema was based on a theatrical performance, with an open (general) shot in which all the action takes place. Griffith overcomes all this by betting on a narrative language and vindicates the director as the figura of maximum responsibility for films (auteur politics).

In 1908 he gets a contract with one of the first film production companies "American Biograph" as an actor and little by little he acquires more responsibility until he becomes director and producer of his own films. Between 1908 and 1913 he makes about 500 films. AB is created with Billy Bitzer. Films between 5 and 15 minutes long based on his scripts and literary adaptations. The fundamental basis is the narrative, but the elements of theater and dance are incorporated. After leaving AB Griffith makes two major films. He begins to raise money with financing from investment banks to make these two feature films.

Griffith introduces realism in cinema for the first time. With him also begins the beginning of American comedy (ordinary characters in extraordinary situations). Before Griffith there were already attempts at experiments with cinematographic resources, he just put them together.
