= Two Memories =

1909 film directed by D. W. Griffith

- Directed by: D. W. Griffith
- Written by: D. W. Griffith
- Starring: Marion Leonard
- Cinematography: G. W. Bitzer
- Distributed by: Biograph Company
- Release date: May 24, 1909
- Running time: 3 minutes (one reel)
- Country: United States
- Language: Silent

Two Memories is a 1909 American silent short drama film directed by D. W. Griffith. The film marks the onscreen debut of Mary Pickford.

== Plot ==
Marion Francis and her sister affectionately embrace. When Henry Lawrence, Marion's boyfriend arrives, the sister leaves. At first the couple are happy. Then Henry sees a photograph that upsets him for some reason. Marion and Henry quarrel, and Henry departs.

Years later, a very ill Henry writes a letter to Marion, asking her to come see him. She is partying with friends. When she reads the letter, she merely laughs, but another woman persuades her to go see him for her own amusement. Her friends tag along. Meanwhile, Henry, holding a photograph of her, collapses on the floor. He drags himself to his chair, then dies, still holding her picture. When she arrives, she does not at first realize he is dead. When she does, she orders her still carousing friends to leave. Taking the photograph from his hand, she repents her coldheartedness.

== Cast ==
- Marion Leonard as Marion Francis
- David Miles as Henry Lawrence
- Mary Pickford as Marion's Sister
- Charles Avery as Party Guest
- Clara T. Bracy
- John R. Cumpson as Party Guest
- Robert Harron
- Anita Hendrie as Party Guest
- Arthur V. Johnson as Party Guest
- Florence Lawrence as Party Guest
- Owen Moore as Party Guest
- Anthony O'Sullivan as Servant
- Lottie Pickford
- Herbert Prior as Party Guest
- Gertrude Robinson as Party Guest
- Mack Sennett as Party Guest

== See also ==
- Mary Pickford filmography
