= And a Little Child Shall Lead Them =

1909 film directed by D. W. Griffith

- Directed by: D. W. Griffith
- Written by: D. W. Griffith
- Starring: Marion Leonard
- Cinematography: G. W. Bitzer
- Release date: March 22, 1909
- Running time: 4 minutes (one reel)
- Country: United States
- Language: Silent

And a Little Child Shall Lead Them is a 1909 American silent short drama film directed by D. W. Griffith. A print of the film exists in the film archive of the Library of Congress.

== Cast ==
- Marion Leonard as The Mother
- Arthur V. Johnson as The Father
- Adele DeGarde as The Daughter
- David Miles as The Lawyer
- Anita Hendrie as The Maid
- Mack Sennett as The Servant
- Florence Lawrence
- John Tansey
