= The Hindoo Dagger =

- Directed by: D. W. Griffith
- Written by: D. W. Griffith
- Starring: Arthur V. Johnson
- Cinematography: G. W. Bitzer
- Release date: February 18, 1909
- Running time: 10 minutes (16 frame/s)
- Country: United States
- Language: Silent

The Hindoo Dagger is a 1909 American short film and mystery drama directed by D. W. Griffith and the film was made by the American Mutoscope and Biograph Company.

== Cast ==
- Harry Solter as Jack Windom
- Marion Leonard as The Woman
- Arthur V. Johnson as Tom
- Robert Harron as Messenger
- John R. Cumpson as The Doctor
- George Gebhardt The Second Lover

== See also ==
- List of American films of 1909
- D. W. Griffith filmography
