= His Lost Love =

1909 film directed by D. W. Griffith

- Directed by: D. W. Griffith
- Written by: D. W. Griffith
- Starring: James Kirkwood, Sr.; Owen Moore; Mary Pickford
- Cinematography: Billy Bitzer
- Distributed by: Biograph Company
- Release date: October 18, 1909
- Running time: 11 minutes
- Country: United States
- Language: Silent (English intertitles)

His Lost Love is a 1909 American silent short drama film directed by D. W. Griffith. A print of the film exists in the film archive of the Library of Congress.

== Cast ==
- James Kirkwood, Sr. as Luke
- Owen Moore as James
- Mary Pickford as Mary
- George Nichols as Mary's Father
- Kate Bruce as Maid
- Gladys Egan as wedding guest
- Frank Evans as wedding guest
- Marion Leonard as the sister / wedding guest
- Violet Mersereau as wedding guest
- Anthony O'Sullivan as wedding guest
- Lottie Pickford as wedding guest
- Gertrude Robinson as A Grown Child
