= Lucky Jim (1909 film) =

1909 silent short film by D. W. Griffith

- Directed by: D. W. Griffith
- Written by: Stanner E. V. Taylor
- Produced by: American Mutoscope and Biograph Company
- Starring: Marion Leonard
- Cinematography: Arthur Marvin; Billy Bitzer
- Distributed by: Biograph Company
- Release date: April 26, 1909
- Running time: 5 minutes
- Country: United States
- Language: Silent

Lucky Jim is a 1909 short film directed by D. W. Griffith. It was produced by the Biograph Company and starred Marion Leonard and Mack Sennett. Originally released in a split-reel with Twin Brothers (1909), prints of the film still exist today.

== Cast ==
- Marion Leonard - Gertrude
- Mack Sennett - Jack
- Herbert Yost - Jim, the First Husband
- Anita Hendrie - The Mother
- David Miles - The Father
- Harry Solter - Jim's Friend

also uncredited

- Linda Arvidson - Wedding Guest
- Billy Bitzer
- John R. Cumpson - Wedding Guest
- Francis R. Grandon -
- Grace Henderson -
- Charles Inslee - Wedding Guest
- Arthur V. Johnson - Wedding Guest
- Florence Lawrence - Wedding Guest
- Owen Moore - Wedding Guest
