= The Helping Hand (1908 American film) =

1908 film directed by D. W. Griffith

- Directed by: D. W. Griffith
- Written by: D. W. Griffith
- Starring: Flora Finch
- Cinematography: Arthur Marvin
- Release date: December 29, 1908
- Running time: 15 minutes (one reel)
- Country: United States
- Language: Silent

The Helping Hand is a 1908 American silent short drama film directed by D. W. Griffith.

== Cast ==
- Flora Finch as Mrs. Harcourt
- Linda Arvidson as Daisy Harcourt
- George Gebhardt as The Man with the Letter / Wedding Guest
- Anita Hendrie as Jessie Marshall
- Charles Inslee
- Florence Lawrence as Wedding Guest
- Mack Sennett as Wedding Guest
- Charles Avery as Man at Brothel
- Robert Harron as Messenger
- Arthur V. Johnson as Mr. Miller
- Marion Leonard as Wedding Guest
- Tom Moore as Man in Office / Wedding Guest
- Harry Solter as Bill Wolfe
