= His Wife's Mother (1909 film) =

1909 film directed by D. W. Griffith

- Directed by: D. W. Griffith
- Written by: D. W. Griffith
- Starring: John R. Cumpson
- Cinematography: Arthur Marvin
- Release date: March 1, 1909
- Running time: 6 minutes (one reel)
- Country: United States
- Language: Silent

His Wife's Mother is a 1909 American silent short comedy film directed by D. W. Griffith.

== Cast ==
- John R. Cumpson as Mr. Eddie Jones
- Florence Lawrence as Mrs. Emma Jones
- Dorothy West as maid
- Anita Hendrie as Mrs. Jones' mother
- Linda Arvidson as restaurant diner
- Flora Finch in unconfirmed role
- Robert Harron as busboy
- Charles Inslee as waiter
- Arthur V. Johnson as restaurant diner
- David Miles at confectionery
- Owen Moore as restaurant diner
- Mack Sennett as waiter
