= In Old Kentucky (1909 film) =

1909 film directed by D. W. Griffith

- Directed by: D. W. Griffith
- Written by: D. W. Griffith
- Starring: Verner Clarges; Kate Bruce
- Cinematography: Billy Bitzer
- Release date: September 20, 1909
- Running time: 11 minutes
- Country: United States
- Language: Silent (English intertitles)

In Old Kentucky is a 1909 American silent short drama film directed by D. W. Griffith. A print of the film exists in the film archive of the Library of Congress.

== Cast ==
- Verner Clarges as Mr. Wilkinson
- Kate Bruce as Mrs. Wilkinson
- Henry B. Walthall as Robert, the Confederate Son
- Owen Moore as The Union Son
- Linda Arvidson as Homecoming Party
- William J. Butler as Union Soldier / Aide
- John R. Cumpson as Negro Servant
- Robert Harron as Extra
- James Kirkwood as Homecoming Party
- George Nichols as Homecoming Party
- Anthony O'Sullivan as Homecoming Party
- Mary Pickford as Homecoming Party
- Frank Powell as Union Soldier / Confederate Soldier
- Gertrude Robinson as Homecoming Party
- Mack Sennett as Union Sentry
