= The Cord of Life (1909 film) =

1909 film directed by D. W. Griffith

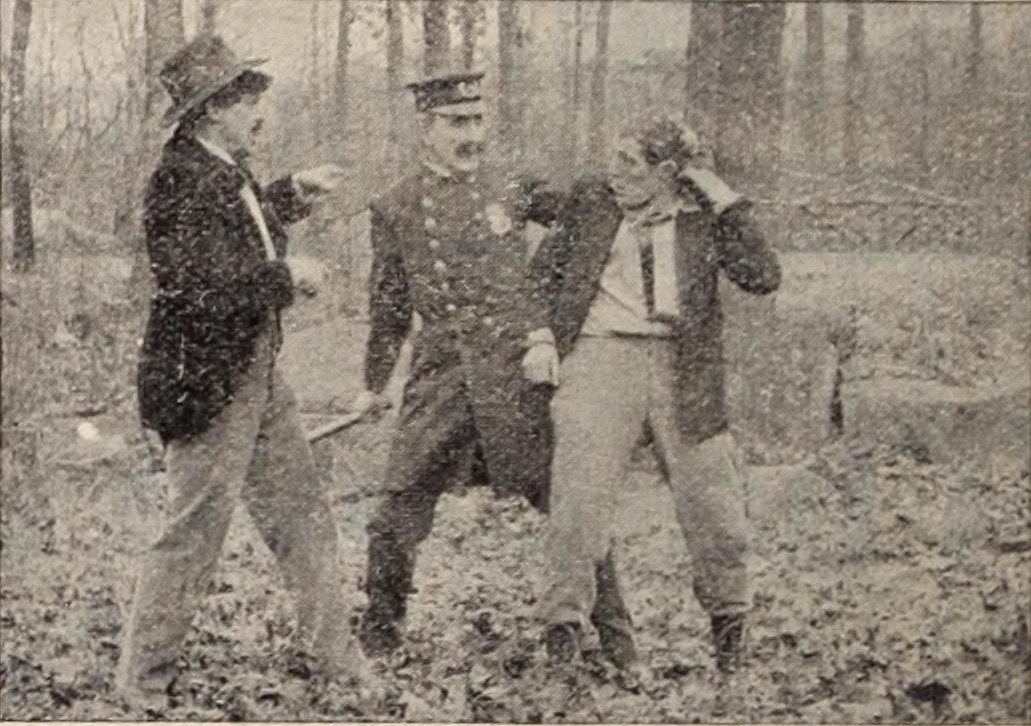
- Directed by: D. W. Griffith
- Written by: D. W. Griffith
- Produced by: Edwin S. Porter
- Starring: Charles Inslee
- Cinematography: G. W. Bitzer; Arthur Marvin
- Production company: Biograph Studios
- Distributed by: Biograph Studios
- Release date: January 28, 1909
- Running time: 14 minutes (one reel)
- Country: United States
- Language: Silent

The Cord of Life is a 1909 American silent short drama film directed by D. W. Griffith. A print of the film exists in the film archive of the Library of Congress.

== Plot ==
According to a film magazine, "Antonine, a worthless good-for-nothing scoundrel, demands money of his cousin Galora, an energetic, provident husband and father. His demands are met with a positive rebuff, and when he becomes insistent he is forcibly ejected by Galora. As he leaves the tenement he vows to get even, and lays in wait until Galora has gone out on business. Climbing to the fifth floor, on which the Galoras live; he watches his chance, which comes when Mrs. Galora goes for an instant to visit a neighbor on the same floor. Darting into the apartment and raising the window he perceives the awful result of a drop to the ground, five stories below, and so evolves a plan that is dastardly in the extreme. Taking the infant child from its cradle, and placing it in a basket he lets it out on a short rope, the end of which he secures by letting the sash down on it, so that to raise the window would precipitate the baby to destruction. Not content with this, he follows Galora and would have killed him were it not for the timely arrival of a policeman, who arrests him. Here he boasts of what he did at the home, and Galora makes a mad race to save his child, who is still dangling five stories from the ground; several times Mr. Galora has approached the window to hang out clothes, etc., but was always called away by some fortuitous happening until Galora bursts in followed by two policemen who have given chase thinking him crazy. They are now in a quandary as to how to rescue the child, for to raise the window meant certain death. At last Galora suggests they let down the top sash and he is held by the feet, as head down he lifts the baby from its perilous position into the room."

The Cord of Life (1909)

== Cast ==
- Charles Inslee as Galora
- Marion Leonard as Galora's Wife
- George Gebhardt as Antonine
- Linda Arvidson as In Tenement
- Dorothy Bernard
- Clara T. Bracy
- John R. Cumpson as In Tenement
- Charles K. French
- Charles Gorman
- Guy Hedlund
- Anita Hendrie as In Tenement
- Arthur V. Johnson as Policeman
- Florence Lawrence as In Tenement
- Adolph Lestina
- David Miles as In Tenement
- Gertrude Robinson as On Street
- Mack Sennett as Policeman
- Harry Solter as On Street
- Dorothy West as In Tenement
