= Where the Breakers Roar =

1908 film directed by D. W. Griffith

- Directed by: D. W. Griffith
- Written by: D. W. Griffith; Stanner E.V. Taylor
- Starring: Arthur V. Johnson
- Cinematography: G. W. Bitzer; Arthur Marvin
- Release date: September 22, 1908
- Running time: 9 minutes (one reel)
- Country: United States
- Language: Silent

Where the Breakers Roar is a 1908 American silent short drama film directed by D. W. Griffith. A print of the film exists in the film archive of the Library of Congress.

== Cast ==
- Arthur V. Johnson as Tom Hudson
- Linda Arvidson as Alice Fairchild
- Charles Inslee as The Villain
- Edward Dillon as Policeman
- George Gebhardt as At the Beach / Assaulted Man
- Robert Harron as On Boardwalk
- Guy Hedlund
- Florence Lawrence as At the Beach
- Marion Leonard
- Mack Sennett as Policeman
- Harry Solter as At the Beach
