= The Man and the Woman =

1908 film directed by D. W. Griffith

- Directed by: D. W. Griffith
- Written by: D. W. Griffith
- Produced by: D. W. Griffith
- Starring: George Gebhardt
- Cinematography: G. W. Bitzer; Arthur Marvin
- Release date: August 14, 1908
- Running time: 13 minutes (one reel)
- Country: United States
- Language: Silent

The Man and the Woman is a 1908 American silent short drama film directed by D. W. Griffith.

== Cast ==
- George Gebhardt as Tom Wilkins
- Linda Arvidson as Gladys
- Charles Inslee as False Clergyman
- Harry Solter as Priest
