= Unto the Third Generation =

- Directed by: Harry Solter
- Written by: Walter MacNamara (story)
- Starring: Earle Foxe; Florence Lawrence; Matt Moore
- Release date: November 28, 1913
- Running time: 2 Reels
- Country: United States
- Languages: Silent film English intertitles

Unto the Third Generation is a 1913 American short silent romantic drama directed by Harry Solter. The film starred Earle Foxe and Florence Lawrence (also producer) and Matt Moore in the lead roles. It was the third time director Harry Solter had worked together with Foxe and Lawrence that year, previously working together on His Wife's Child and The Spender.

The film was written by Walter MacNamara.

== Cast ==
- Florence Lawrence
- Matt Moore
- Earle Foxe
- Jack Newton
- Leonora von Ottinger
- Percy Standing
- Joseph MacDonald
- Frank Bennett
- Frank Emmet

== Reception ==
The film is said to be one of the productions presenting family as the ultimate refuge for unhappy Jewish people.
