= For Love of Gold =

1908 film directed by D. W. Griffith

- Directed by: D. W. Griffith
- Written by: D. W. Griffith
- Starring: Harry Solter
- Cinematography: Arthur Marvin
- Release date: August 21, 1908
- Running time: 9 minutes (one reel)
- Country: United States
- Language: Silent

For Love of Gold is a 1908 American silent short crime film directed by D. W. Griffith. It is based on the short story "Just Meat" by Jack London.

== Cast ==
- Harry Solter as Thief / Butler
- George Gebhardt as Thief
- Charles Gorman
- Charles Inslee
