= An Affair of Honor =

An Affair of Honor may refer to:

- An Affair of Honor (film), a 1901 American silent film
- An Affair of Honor (short story), a 1965 short story by Vladimir Nabokov
- An Affair of Honor (Bridgerton), an episode of the TV series Bridgerton
