= The Vaquero's Vow =

1908 film directed by D. W. Griffith

- Directed by: D. W. Griffith
- Written by: D. W. Griffith
- Starring: Charles Inslee
- Cinematography: G. W. Bitzer
- Release date: October 16, 1908
- Running time: 13 minutes (one reel)
- Country: United States
- Language: Silent

The Vaquero's Vow is a 1908 American silent short drama film directed by D. W. Griffith.

== Cast ==
- Charles Inslee as Renaldo
- Harry Solter as Gonzales
- Linda Arvidson
- Gladys Egan as Little Girl
- Frank Evans
- George Gebhardt as Wedding Party / Bartender
- Arthur V. Johnson as Wedding Party / In Bar
- Florence Lawrence as Wedding Party / In Bar
- Wilfred Lucas
- Jeanie MacPherson
- Mack Sennett as Wedding Party / In Bar
