= The Pirate's Gold =

1908 film directed by D. W. Griffith

- Directed by: D. W. Griffith
- Written by: D. W. Griffith; Stanner E.V. Taylor
- Starring: George Gebhardt
- Cinematography: G. W. Bitzer; Arthur Marvin
- Release date: November 6, 1908
- Running time: 16 minutes (one reel)
- Country: United States
- Language: Silent

The Pirate's Gold is a 1908 American silent short drama film directed by D. W. Griffith.

== Plot ==
Young Wilkinson (George Gebhardt) leaves his elderly mother (Linda Arvidson) at their coastal cottage to seek his fortune abroad. Meanwhile, a violent storm wrecks a ship belonging to a band of ruthless pirates. The pirate chief and his two underlings manage to escape to the shore in a small boat, carrying a heavy chest filled with pillaged gold and valuables.

Once safe on land, the three pirates begin dividing their stolen spoils. A bitter argument breaks out, and the two underlings mutiny against their leader. The chief successfully strikes down one mutineer and strangles the other, but not before being stabbed in the back. Mortally wounded and bleeding out, the chief gathers up the gold and stumbles through the raging storm until he reaches the Wilkinson cottage. He begs Mrs. Wilkinson to hide the treasure. She obliges by prying loose several bricks from her fireplace and concealing the gold inside the hearth, just before the pirate chief collapses and dies. Moments later, Mrs. Wilkinson is struck and killed by a bolt of lightning, leaving the secret of the hidden gold buried with her.

Years later, Young Wilkinson returns home, marries, and falls into severe financial debt. Facing ruin and harassed by a persistent creditor (Charles Inslee), a despondent Wilkinson decides to commit suicide. Just as he raises a gun to his head, his wife rushes forward and pushes his arm aside. The weapon discharges wildly into the fireplace, shattering the loose bricks. The impact reveals the long-lost pirate gold, instantly solving the family's financial crisis and saving Wilkinson's life.

== Cast ==
- George Gebhardt as Young Wilkinson
- Linda Arvidson as Mrs. Wilkinson
- Charles Inslee as A Creditor (unconfirmed)
- Arthur V. Johnson
- Florence Lawrence
- George Nichols
- Anthony O'Sullivan
- Mack Sennett as A Pirate
