= A Smoked Husband =

1908 film directed by D. W. Griffith

- Directed by: D. W. Griffith
- Written by: Frank E. Woods
- Starring: John R. Cumpson
- Cinematography: G. W. Bitzer
- Release date: September 25, 1908
- Running time: 8 minutes (one reel)
- Country: United States
- Language: Silent

A Smoked Husband is a 1908 American silent short comedy film directed by D. W. Griffith.

== Cast ==
- John R. Cumpson as Mr. Bibbs
- Florence Lawrence as Mrs. Bibbs
- Linda Arvidson as Maid
- George Gebhardt as Man in Top Hat
- Robert Harron as Messenger
- Arthur V. Johnson as Policeman
- George Nichols
- Alfred Paget
- Mack Sennett as Man in Top Hat
- Harry Solter as Maid's Accomplice
- Kate Toncray as Mother
