= A Calamitous Elopement =

1908 film directed by D. W. Griffith

- Play film; runtime 00:07:47.
- Directed by: D. W. Griffith
- Written by: D. W. Griffith
- Produced by: American Mutoscope and Biograph Company
- Starring: Harry Solter
- Cinematography: G. W. Bitzer; Arthur Marvin
- Release date: August 7, 1908
- Running time: 12 minutes (one reel)
- Country: United States
- Language: Silent

A Calamitous Elopement is a 1908 American silent short comedy film directed by D. W. Griffith. A print of the film is preserved in the film archive of the Library of Congress.

== Plot ==
A young couple decides to elope after being caught in the midst of a romantic moment by the woman's angry father. They make plans to leave, but a thief discovers their plans and hides in their trunk and waits for the right moment to steal their belongings.

== Cast ==
- Harry Solter as Frank
- Linda Arvidson as Jennie
- Charles Inslee as Jennie's Father
- George Gebhardt as Bill, a Thief
- John R. Cumpson
- D. W. Griffith as Policeman
- Robert Harron as Bellboy
- Florence Lawrence
- Anthony O'Sullivan
