= The Zulu's Heart =

1908 film directed by D. W. Griffith

- Directed by: D. W. Griffith
- Written by: D. W. Griffith
- Starring: Charles Inslee
- Cinematography: G. W. Bitzer
- Release date: October 6, 1908
- Running time: 776 feet (approximately 12 minutes)
- Country: United States
- Language: Silent

The Zulu's Heart is an extant 1908 American silent short drama film directed by D. W. Griffith for the American Mutoscope and Biograph Company. Location footage was shot in Cliffside, New Jersey. White actors in blackface portray Zulus.

== Cast ==
- Charles Inslee as Zulu chief
- George Gebhardt as Zulu warrior
- Harry Solter as a Boer
- Florence Lawrence as Boer's wife
- Gladys Egan as Boer's daughter
- John R. Cumpson as Zulu warrior
- Arthur V. Johnson as Zulu warrior
- W. Chrystie Miller, uncredited
- Alfred Paget, uncredited
- Mack Sennett, uncredited
