= Father Gets in the Game =

1908 film directed by D. W. Griffith

- Play film; runtime 00:08:12.
- Directed by: D. W. Griffith
- Written by: D. W. Griffith
- Produced by: American Mutoscope and Biograph Company
- Starring: Mack Sennett
- Cinematography: G. W. Bitzer
- Release date: October 10, 1908
- Running time: 9-10 minutes (1 reel; original film length 604 feet)
- Country: United States
- Language: Silent

Father Gets in the Game is a 1908 American silent short comedy film directed by D. W. Griffith. A print of the film exists.

== Cast ==
- Mack Sennett as Bill Wilkins
- Harry Solter as Wilkins' Son
- George Gebhardt as Professor Dyem / First Couple
- Linda Arvidson
- Charles Avery as The Butler
- Charles Gorman
- Charles Inslee as Clumsy Waiter (unconfirmed)
- Florence Lawrence as First Couple
- Marion Leonard
- Jeanie MacPherson
