= The Greatest Thing in Life =

1918 film directed by D. W. Griffith

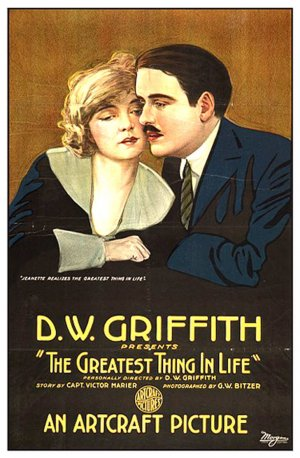
- Film poster
- Directed by: D. W. Griffith
- Written by: Lillian Gish; D. W. Griffith; Stanner E.V. Taylor
- Produced by: D. W. Griffith
- Starring: Robert Harron; Lillian Gish
- Cinematography: G. W. Bitzer; Henrik Sartov (French)
- Edited by: James Smith
- Production company: Famous Players–Lasky/Artcraft
- Distributed by: Paramount Pictures
- Release date: December 16, 1918 (U.S.)
- Running time: 70 minutes
- Country: U.S.
- Language: Silent (English intertitles)

The Greatest Thing in Life is a 1918 American silent drama film about World War I, directed by D. W. Griffith and starring Lillian Gish, Robert Harron, and David Butler. The film is now considered lost as no prints are known to exist.

This film was released later in the same year as Griffith's more famous World War I film, Hearts of the World, which also stars Lillian Gish and Robert Harron. The Greatest Thing in Life was renowned for two main aspects: the groundbreaking portrait photography style of Henrik Sartov, and a "new and daring" interracial kiss between a white officer and a black soldier (both male).

== Plot ==
As described in a film magazine, Leo Peret has a small quiet tobacco shop in Greenwich Village. Edward Livingston, a wealthy young clubman and man-about-town, comes in frequently ostensibly to buy cigarettes but in reality to talk to the daughter Jeannette, and he is soon in love with the little shop girl. Leo is homesick for his native France, but lacks the funds to make the passage. Edward, learning of their plight, sends $1,000 with a note saying that the money is payment for a good deed. Leo accepts the money and he and Jeannette embark at once. In France Leo regains his health but suffers a broken leg. When Edward learns of this he goes to France and seeks out Jeannette to resume his lovemaking. He finds that he has a rival, however, in Mons Le Bebe, a grocer, and after forcefully embracing Jeannette one evening, she bids him to be gone forever. She is discouraged over Le Bebe's fondness for garlic and his refusal to accept the beauties of Chantecler. But a chicken is just a chicken to Le Bebe.

War with Germany is declared and Le Bebe marches off to battle with Jeannette's blessing. The French soldiers are driven from the town by the Germans and Jeannette, her father and aunt, and little Peaches seek safety in the cellar. Leo is trusted with the hiding place of a telephone and he volunteers to keep the French posted. In defense of the town Le Bebe is shot in the leg, and he drags himself to the cellar. Jeannette hides him under some sand and he escapes capture. Meanwhile, Edward has enlisted in the American army that comes to the aid of France, and although he despises his fellow soldiers, he is a brave man. In a charge two companies become mixed and he finds himself in a shell hole with a black soldier who is dying. Edward's manliness asserts itself and he accomplishes the soldier's final request.

Leo is discovered listening to a German officer discussing plans and is shot. He creeps back to the cellar and Jeannette relays the information by telephone to the French. Just as the Germans reach the cellar and force their way in, American troops enter the town. Le Bebe dies defending Jeannette, and she is saved from death by an American scouting party led by Edward. Later at the town's bakery shop, Jeannette hands out cakes and pies to the soldiers. Edward renews his lovemaking, and she is pleased with her American sweetheart.

== Cast ==
- Robert Harron as Edward Livingston
- Lillian Gish as Jeannette Peret
- David Butler as Mr. Mons Le Bebe
- Peaches Jackson as Miss Peaches
- Adolph Lestina as Leo Peret
- Elmo Lincoln as the American soldier
- Edward Peil Sr. as the German officer
- Kate Bruce as Jeannette's aunt
- ZaSu Pitts (scenes deleted)
- Ernest Butterworth (uncredited)
- Carol Dempster as dancer (uncredited)
- Fred Malatesta (uncredited)
- Lucille Young (uncredited)

== Background ==
After attaining significant fame as a director of war pictures, D. W. Griffith was invited by the British government to film on actual World War I battlefields. Griffith had originally intended to make only a single picture with the material, but came back with over 86,000 feet and decided to turn it into three.

The chief production was Hearts of the World, with The Great Love and The Greatest Thing in Life made with the leftover battlefield footage. Some of the footage was filmed on the Marne River in Château-Thierry, France. There is some speculation, however, as to whether some of the shots originated in the Salisbury Plain Training Area, in the United Kingdom, or was footage purchased by Griffith from Franz Kleinschmidt.

== Preservation status ==
The film is now considered to be a lost film as no prints are known to exist. Previously, the Cohen Media Group listed this film as part of their holdings from Raymond Rohauer collection, but this turned out to be an error.

== See also ==
- List of lost films
