= In the Season of Buds =

1910 silent short drama film by D. W. Griffith

- Directed by: D. W. Griffith
- Written by: Stanner E. V. Taylor
- Produced by: Biograph Company
- Starring: Mary Pickford; Mack Sennett
- Cinematography: G. W. Bitzer; Arthur Marvin
- Distributed by: Biograph
- Release date: June 2, 1910
- Running time: 1 reel; 990 feet
- Country: United States
- Language: Silent (English intertitles)

In the Season of Buds is a 1910 silent short film directed by D. W. Griffith and starring Mary Pickford and Mack Sennett. It was produced and distributed by the Biograph Company.

== Cast ==
- Mack Sennett as Henry
- Mary Pickford as Mabel
- Charles H. West as Steve
- W. Chrystie Miller as Uncle Zeke
- Kate Bruce as Aunt

== Preservation status ==
A paper print of the film is held by the Library of Congress.
