= Mrs. Matthews, Dressmaker =

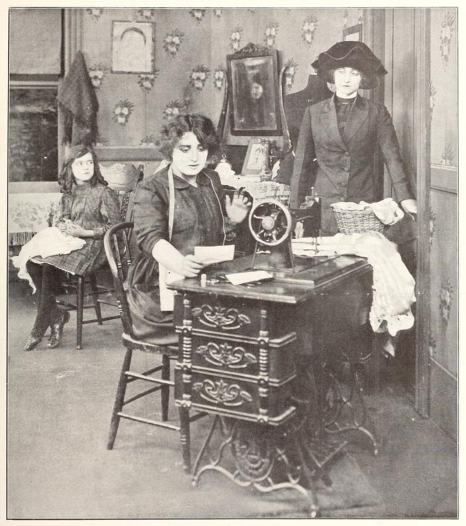
- Still with actors (from left) Gladys Egan, Margarita Fischer and (likely) Miss Van Selle
- Directed by: Francis J. Grandon
- Written by: Beatrice Morse
- Produced by: Carl Laemmle; Independent Moving Pictures
- Starring: Harry A. Pollard; Margarita Fischer; Gladys Egan
- Distributed by: Motion Picture Distributors and Sales Company
- Release date: February 8, 1912
- Country: United States
- Languages: Silent; English intertitles

Mrs. Matthews, Dressmaker is a 1912 American drama film directed by Francis J. Grandon and starring Margarita Fischer in the title role. It was produced by the Independent Moving Pictures Company.
