= After Many Years (1908 film) =

1908 film directed by D. W. Griffith

- Directed by: D. W. Griffith
- Written by: Alfred Lord Tennyson; Frank E. Woods
- Starring: Charles Inslee; Florence Lawrence
- Cinematography: G. W. Bitzer; Arthur Marvin
- Release date: November 3, 1908
- Running time: 17 minutes (16 frame/s)
- Country: United States
- Language: Silent with English intertitles

After Many Years is a 1908 American silent drama film directed by D. W. Griffith. Prints of the film exist in the Library of Congress film archive. The film is an adaptation of Enoch Arden.

== Plot ==
The short film is about a love triangle, in which a young lady discovers that she is in love with her boyfriend's best friend after her sweetheart dies at sea.

== Cast ==
- Charles Inslee as John Davis
- Florence Lawrence as Mrs. John Davis
- Harry Solter as Tom Foster
- Gladys Egan as The Davis' daughter
- Linda Arvidson
- Edward Dillon
- George Gebhardt as A sailor
- Arthur V. Johnson as Member of the rescue party
- Herbert Prior
- Mack Sennett as Sailor/Member of the rescue party

== See also ==
- 1908 in film
- D. W. Griffith filmography
