= Charles Gorman (actor) =

American actor

Charles Gorman (1865 – January 25, 1928), was an American actor of the silent era. He appeared in more than 80 films between 1908 and 1929.

== Selected filmography ==
- The Fatal Hour (1908)
- For Love of Gold (1908)
- For a Wife's Honor (1908)
- Father Gets in the Game (1908)
- An Awful Moment (1908)
- The Cord of Life (1909)
- The Girls and Daddy (1909)
- At the Altar (1909)
- The Blind Princess and the Poet (1911)
- The Old Bookkeeper (1912)
- Under Burning Skies (1912)
- The Goddess of Sagebrush Gulch (1912)
- The Lesser Evil (1912)
- A Temporary Truce (1912)
- The Inner Circle (1912)
- With the Enemy's Help (1912)
- The Chief's Blanket (1912)
- The Painted Lady (1912)
- A Sailor's Heart (1912)
- The God Within (1912)
- Broken Ways (1913)
- The Left-Handed Man (1913)
- A Timely Interception (1913)
- Red Hicks Defies the World (1913)
- The Enemy's Baby (1913)
- The Mistake (1913)
- When Love Forgives (1913)
- The Battle at Elderbush Gulch (1913)
- The Yaqui Cur (1913)
- Almost a Wild Man (1913)
- The Massacre (1914)
- The Electric Alarm (1915)
- Let Katie Do It (1916)
- A Sister of Six (1916)
- The Children of the Feud (1916)
- The Babes in the Woods (1917)
- Treasure Island (1918)
- The Devil Within (1921)
- Bare Knuckles (1921)
- The Gay Retreat (1927)
- The Far Call (1929)
