= The Tell-Tale Step =

1917 silent film

- Directed by: Burton George
- Written by: William Addison Lathrop
- Starring: Pat O'Malley; Shirley Mason; Guido Colucci
- Cinematography: Charles E. Gilson
- Production company: Edison Studios
- Distributed by: K-E-S-E Service
- Release date: May 28, 1917
- Running time: 50 minutes
- Country: United States
- Languages: Silent; English intertitles

The Tell-Tale Step is a lost 1917 American silent crime drama film directed by Burton George and starring Pat O'Malley, Shirley Mason and Guido Colucci.

== Cast ==
- Pat O'Malley as Hugh Graham
- Shirley Mason as Lucia
- Guido Colucci as Giovanni Pallazzi
- Charles Sutton as Luigi
- Robert Huggins as Pietro
- Nellie Grant as Rosetta
- Bigelow Cooper as Dimitri
- Sally Crute as Beverly Winton
- Jessie Stevens as Hugh's Mother
- Leonora von Ottinger as Mrs. Arbuthnot
- Grace Morrissey as Miss Stryver
- Robert Brower as Doctor Oppenheim

== Preservation ==
With no holdings located in archives, The Tell-Tale Step is considered a lost film.

== Bibliography ==
- Giorgio Bertellini. Italy in Early American Cinema: Race, Landscape, and the Picturesque. Indiana University Press, 2010.
