= A Career of Crime =

American film series

A Career of Crime is an American Mutoscope film series made in New York City in 1900. The film series includes No. 1: Start in Life; No. 2: Going the Pace; No. 3: Robbery & Murder; No. 4: In the Toils and part 5, Death in the Electric Chair. It was marketed with an electric chair and depicts its use in carrying out the death penalty. It was filmed in New York City and depicts an execution at Sing Sing Prison. It is part of a film series. Arthur Marvin was the cinematographer.

The Library of Congress listed it with a copyright year of 1902. In 1907, a Billboard advertisement offered it and reels for Execution of a Spy and The Wizard and the Model.

It succeeded the American Mutoscope & Biograph Company film An Execution by Hanging, a movie filmed in a Jacksonville, Florida prison in 1898 that was the first motion picture to depict an execution.

The Smithsonian has an advertisement for Death in the Electric Chair at Sing Sing. The George Eastman Museum has the mutoscope for the film but it is in poor condition and missing its hub. In 2022 a Mutoscope with the film reel was auctioned.
