= Stanner E.V. Taylor =

American screenwriter

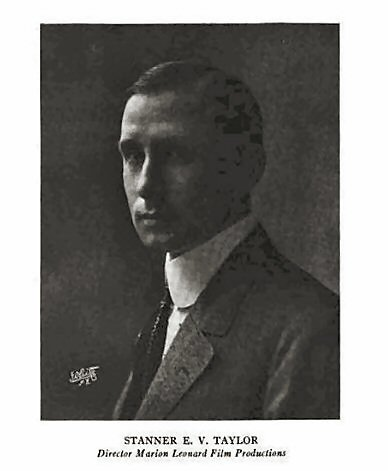
- The Theater of Science vol. 29 - 1914
- Born: September 28, 1877; St. Louis, Missouri, USA
- Died: November 23, 1948 (aged 71); Los Angeles, California, USA
- Years active: 1908–1929
- Spouse: Marion Leonard

Stanner E.V. Taylor (September 28, 1877 – November 23, 1948) was an American screenwriter and film director of the silent era. He wrote for more than 100 films between 1908 and 1929.

== Biography ==
He was born on September 28, 1877, in St. Louis, Missouri, and died on November 23, 1948, in Los Angeles, California. He was married to Biograph Company actress Marion Leonard. The worked together in Where the Breakers Roar (1908).

== Career ==
He wrote Native Americans and western films like Comata, the Sioux (1909), The Kentuckian (1908), A Mohawk's Way (1910), The Mohican's Daughter (1910), The Squaw's Love (1911), and The Yaqui Cur (1913).

He met D. W. Griffith when he first arrived at Biograph Company, when newspaperman Lee Doc Dougherty headed the story department and hired Griffith as chief scenarist. He worked under the direction of Griffith in The Mended Lute (1909), The Impalement (1910), The Purgation (1910), A Flash of Light (1910), The Great Love (1918), The Greatest Thing in Life (1918), The Girl Who Stayed at Home (1919), Scarlet Days (1919), The Greatest Question (1919) and The Idol Dancer (1920). They worked together in the screenplay for The Hun Within (1918).

He worked with Mack Sennett in Over the Hills to the Poor House (1908), In the Season of Buds (1910), A Midnight Cupid (1910) and An Arcadian Maid (1910).

He directed an unknown film called The Terror, released on July 13, 1922.

== Selected filmography ==
- The Adventures of Dollie (1908)
- The Greaser's Gauntlet (1908)
- Where the Breakers Roar (1908)
- The Pirate's Gold (1908)
- The Kentuckian (1908)
- One Touch of Nature (1909)
- In Old California (1910)
- A Romance of the Western Hills (1910)
- Ramona (1910)
- In the Border States (1910)
- What the Daisy Said (1910)
- A Flash of Light (1910)
- A Mohawk's Way (1910)
- The Last Drop of Water (1911)
- Through Darkened Vales (1911)
- Under Burning Skies (1912)
- The Goddess of Sagebrush Gulch (1912)
- In the Aisles of the Wild (1912)
- The Tenderfoot's Money (1913)
- Two Men of the Desert (1913)
- The Yaqui Cur (1913)
- The Rise of Susan (1916)
- Passers By (1916)
- Public Be Damned (1917)
- The Great Love (1918)
- The Greatest Thing in Life (1918)
- The Greatest Question (1919)
- The Mohican's Daughter (1922)
- Roulette (1924)
- The Miracle of Life (1926)
- Dog Law (1928)
- The Red Sword (1929)

== Bibliography ==
- Graham, Cooper C. (1985). D.W. Griffith and the Biograph Company. Scarecrow Press. p. 333. ISBN 9780810818064.
- Hilger, Michael (October 16, 2015). Native Americans in the Movies: Portrayals from Silent Films to the Present. Rowman & Littlefield. p. 464. ISBN 9781442240025.
- Walker, Brent E. (April 25, 2013). Mack Sennett's Fun Factory: A History and Filmography of His Studio and His Keystone and Mack Sennett Comedies, with Biographies of Players and Personnel. McFarland Publishing. p. 671. ISBN 9780786477111.
