= A Trap for Santa Claus =

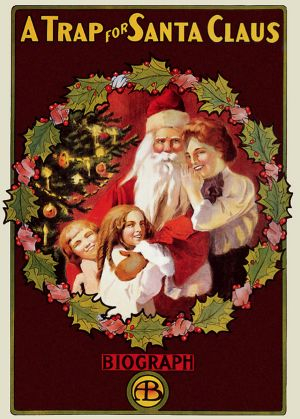
- Theatrical poster to A Trap for Santa Claus
- Directed by: D. W. Griffith
- Produced by: Biograph Company
- Starring: Henry B. Walthall; Marion Leonard; Gladys Egan
- Cinematography: G. W. Bitzer
- Distributed by: Biograph Company
- Release date: December 20, 1909
- Running time: 15-16 minutes (1 reel, 989 feet)
- Country: United States
- Language: English

Play film; runtime 00:15:12.

A Trap for Santa Claus is a 1909 one-reel American silent drama film. A Biograph Company production, it was directed by D. W. Griffith and stars Henry B. Walthall, Marion Leonard, and Gladys Egan.

== Plot ==
Arthur Rogers (Walthall) is an unemployed, drunkard husband and father who has no money for a Christmas celebration. A title describes the situation as "misery and want, the family's lot." Helen Rogers (Leonard), his wife, cries with their daughter over their poverty. Arthur leaves to go to the tavern. He asks the bartender (Sennett) to put an alcoholic drink on his tab, which he refuses. Two patrons buy drinks for Arthur and invite him to their table. He becomes intoxicated and returns home to a frightened wife and daughter (Egan). Arthur is described as "helpless, the father leaves the house of sorrow." He writes a letter: "Dear Helen, you will be better off without me. I leave for good. May God help you. Arthur." He slides the letter through the door, then leaves. Helen picks up the letter to read his words. Arthur returns to the bar, where he drinks to the point of unconsciousness. The bartender picks him up and throws him outside. Helen and her daughter leave the house to go to an employment agency, but are turned away. They return to the house to find the son (Tansey) ate their only food: a small loaf of bread. His arm is also in an unexplained sling.

An attorney stops at Helen's house to tell her of litigations that have cleared, and she is now the beneficiary of her late aunt's estate. She and the children are overjoyed. Helen is seen wearing a luxurious hat, as the attorneys direct her to her new home. It is furnished with lavish embellishments, but its only flaw is that it is without a chimney. On Christmas Eve, Helen tells the children that Santa Claus will come through the window. She drags the children to bed. They pray, and she kisses them and tucks them into bed. The children sneak out of bed to set a trap by the window. The purpose of the trap is unclear, but a logical conclusion is to make Santa trip and fall, causing a commotion, and thus witness him to prove his existence. Helen bought a Santa costume and happily considers dressing up to fool her children into believing that Santa is real. She is saddened to realize that the costume should be worn by a male, namely her husband. She is unaware that her husband now makes his living as a burglar. He sees the mansion and trespasses through the window, not knowing that it now belongs to his wife. Arthur is caught in the trap. Helen, catching her husband's attempted burglary against her and their children, is naturally shocked. And he is ashamed. Arthur begs for her to take him back, and she agrees after a long consideration. Arthur plays Santa Claus for his children.

== Cast ==
- Henry B. Walthall as Arthur Rogers
- Marion Leonard as Helen Rogers
- Gladys Egan as The Rogers' Daughter
- Kate Bruce as The Maid
- William J. Butler as The Attorney
- W. Chrystie Miller as The Grandfather
- John Tansey as The Rogers' Son
- Charles Craig as The Bar Patron
- Anthony O'Sullivan as The Bar Patron
- Mack Sennett as The Bartender

== See also ==
- List of Christmas films
