= A Millionaire for a Day =

The Man of the West
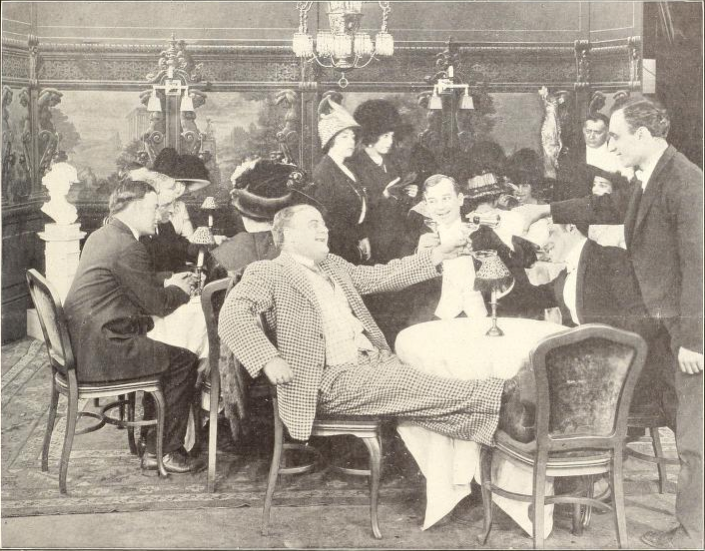
- Cumpson (center, seated) in a scene from the film.
- Directed by: Frederick A. Thomson
- Written by: Frederick A. Thomson
- Produced by: Carl Laemmle; Independent Moving Pictures
- Starring: John R. Cumpson
- Distributed by: Motion Picture Distributors and Sales Company
- Release date: April 22, 1912
- Country: United States
- Languages: Silent; English intertitles

A Millionaire for a Day is a 1912 American silent comedy short film starring John R. Cumpson. It was produced by the Independent Moving Pictures (IMP) Company of New York.

The story is based on a real-life incident reported in newspapers across the United States in January 1912. A John Jay McDevitt of Wilkes-Barre, Pennsylvania, sold an accidental nomination for county treasurer for $2500 and traveled to New York City with an entourage (a doctor, a secretary, a valet and about 20 guests) on a special train, making speeches to appreciative audiences at stops along the way and arriving with only $72.40 left. There he fulfilled his ambition of acting the way he believed a millionaire would, spending and tipping lavishly.

== Plot ==
Mechanic Fred Dudley goes to New York City and squanders his entire inheritance in a day. Then, broke but wiser, he returns home to Wilkes-Barre.

== Cast ==
- John R. Cumpson as Fred Dudley
- Frank Russell as The Foreman
- Frank Hall Crane as The Bank Cashier
- Hayward Mack as The Bank Teller
- Walter Long as The Clerk in the Clothing Store
- Rogers J.R. as The Gambler
- William Cunningham as The Judge

== Preservation status ==
According to one source, George Eastman House has three film frames in its collection.

== Reception ==
The Meridian Daily Journal noted that the film was a "screaming comedy". The Calumet News also covered the film, reviewing it favorably.
