= Behind the Scenes (1908 film) =

1908 film directed by D. W. Griffith

- Directed by: D. W. Griffith
- Written by: D. W. Griffith
- Starring: Florence Lawrence
- Cinematography: Arthur Marvin
- Release date: September 11, 1908
- Running time: 8 minutes (one reel; original release length 530 feet)
- Country: United States
- Language: Silent

Behind the Scenes is a 1908 American silent short drama film written and directed by D. W. Griffith.

== Cast ==
- Florence Lawrence as Mrs. Bailey
- Gladys Egan as Mrs. Bailey's Daughter
- Kate Bruce
- George Gebhardt as Member of Audience
- Robert Harron as Messenger
- Charles Inslee as Manager
- George Nichols as The Doctor
- Mack Sennett as Backstage Man
