= The Romance of an Old Maid =

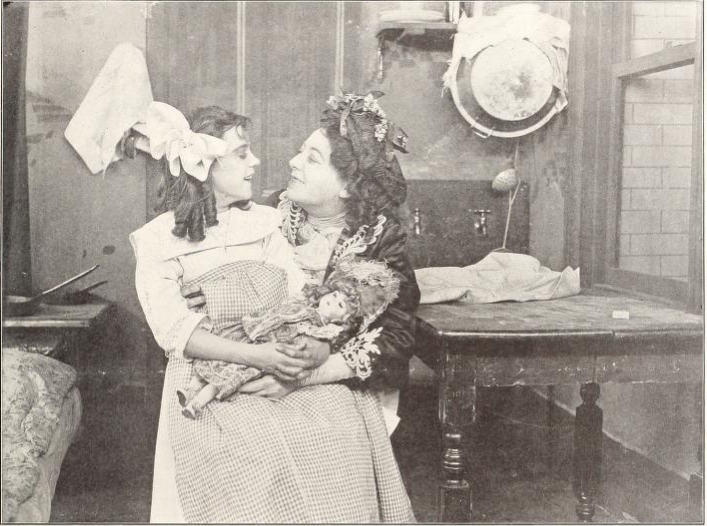
- Film still of actress Gladys Egan (left) being held by Rolinda Bainbridge
- Directed by: Otis Turner
- Written by: R.H. Danforth
- Produced by: Carl Laemmle; Independent Moving Pictures
- Starring: King Baggot; Rolinda Bainbridge; Gladys Egan; William E. Shay
- Distributed by: Motion Picture Distributors and Sales Company
- Release date: March 25, 1912
- Country: United States
- Languages: Silent; English intertitles

The Romance of an Old Maid is a 1912 American short film directed by Otis Turner and starring King Baggot and Rolinda Bainbridge (in the title role) with Gladys Egan and William E. Shay as supporting cast. It was produced by the Independent Moving Pictures Company of New York.
