= Hayward Mack =

American actor (1882–1921)

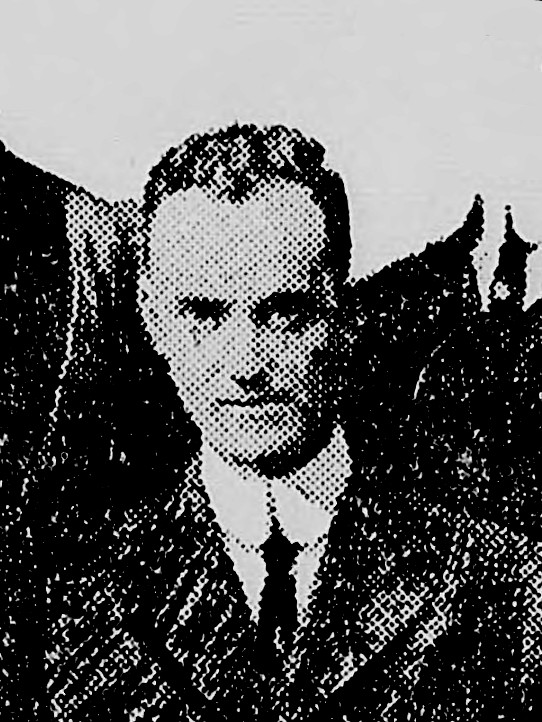
- Mack, 1919
- Born: March 20, 1882; Albany, New York, US
- Died: December 24, 1921 (aged 39); Los Angeles, California, US
- Occupation: Actor
- Years active: 1910–1921

Hayward Seaton Mack (March 20, 1882 – December 24, 1921) was an American actor of the silent era.

Born in Albany, New York, in 1882, Mack appeared in more than 80 films between 1910 and 1921. Mack's motion picture career began in 1910; he appeared in films of many leading motion picture companies of the time. He had also worked in vaudeville and in stage productions. Before embarking on an entertainment career Mack was a civil engineer and also worked as a newspaper man.

Mack died in Los Angeles, California, in 1921. Mack committed suicide in Los Angeles' Lafayette Park by taking poison.

== Selected filmography ==
Year	Film	Role	Notes
1912	Percy Learns to Waltz	Harry	
1912	A Millionaire for a Day	The Bank Teller	
1912	Betty, the Coxswain	Ralph Cummings	
1912	An Eventful Bargain Day	Robert Lee, the Husband	
1913	The Baldheaded Club		
1913	The Wedding Gown		
1914	The Master Cracksman	District attorney	Alternative titles: The Martin Mystery; The Square Shooter
1914	A Foolish Agreement		
1915	Graft		
1915	Father and the Boys	Major Bellamy Didsworth	
1916	Dolly's Scoop	James Fairfax	
1916	The Grip of Jealousy	Phillip Grant	
1916	Tangled Hearts	Montgomery Seaton	
1916	The Gilded Spider	Burton Armitage	Alternative title: The Full Cup
1916	The Jackals of a Great City		
1917	The Flame of Youth	Sir Beverly Wyndham	
1917	Love Letters	Robert Maxwell	
1918	The Winding Trail	Alvin Steele	
1918	The Guilty Man	Jacques Ristac	
1918	The Goddess of Lost Lake	Chester Martin	
1918	All the World to Nothing	Charles Renalls	
1919	It Happened in Paris	Leon Naisson	
1919	The Speed Maniac	Philip Malcolm	
1919	Fighting Through	Raymond Haynes	
1919	Thieves	Henry Hartland	
1920	Going Some	Laden	
1920	The Girl in the Web	Chapman Price	
1920	The Gamesters	Jim Welch	
1921	Oliver Twist, Jr.	Monk	
1921	Play Square	Bill Homer	
1921	Live Wires	James Flannery	
1921	Playing with Fire	Bruce Tilford	
