= Percy Learns to Waltz =

- John R. Cumpson and cast in a scene from the film, originally published in The Implet.
- Directed by: William Robert Daly
- Written by: Sidney Franklin
- Produced by: Carl Laemmle; Independent Moving Pictures
- Starring: John R. Cumpson; Grace Lewis; Hayward Mack
- Distributed by: Motion Picture Distributors and Sales Company
- Release date: March 16, 1912
- Country: United States
- Languages: Silent; English intertitles

Percy Learns to Waltz is a 1912 American silent comedy film starring John R. Cumpson. It was produced by the Independent Moving Pictures (IMP) Company of New York.

== Cast ==
- John R. Cumpson
- Frank Russell Frank Russell
- Frank Hall Crane
- Hayward Mack
- Walter Long
- Rogers J.R.
- William Cunningham
