= An Arcadian Maid =

1910 film directed by D. W. Griffith

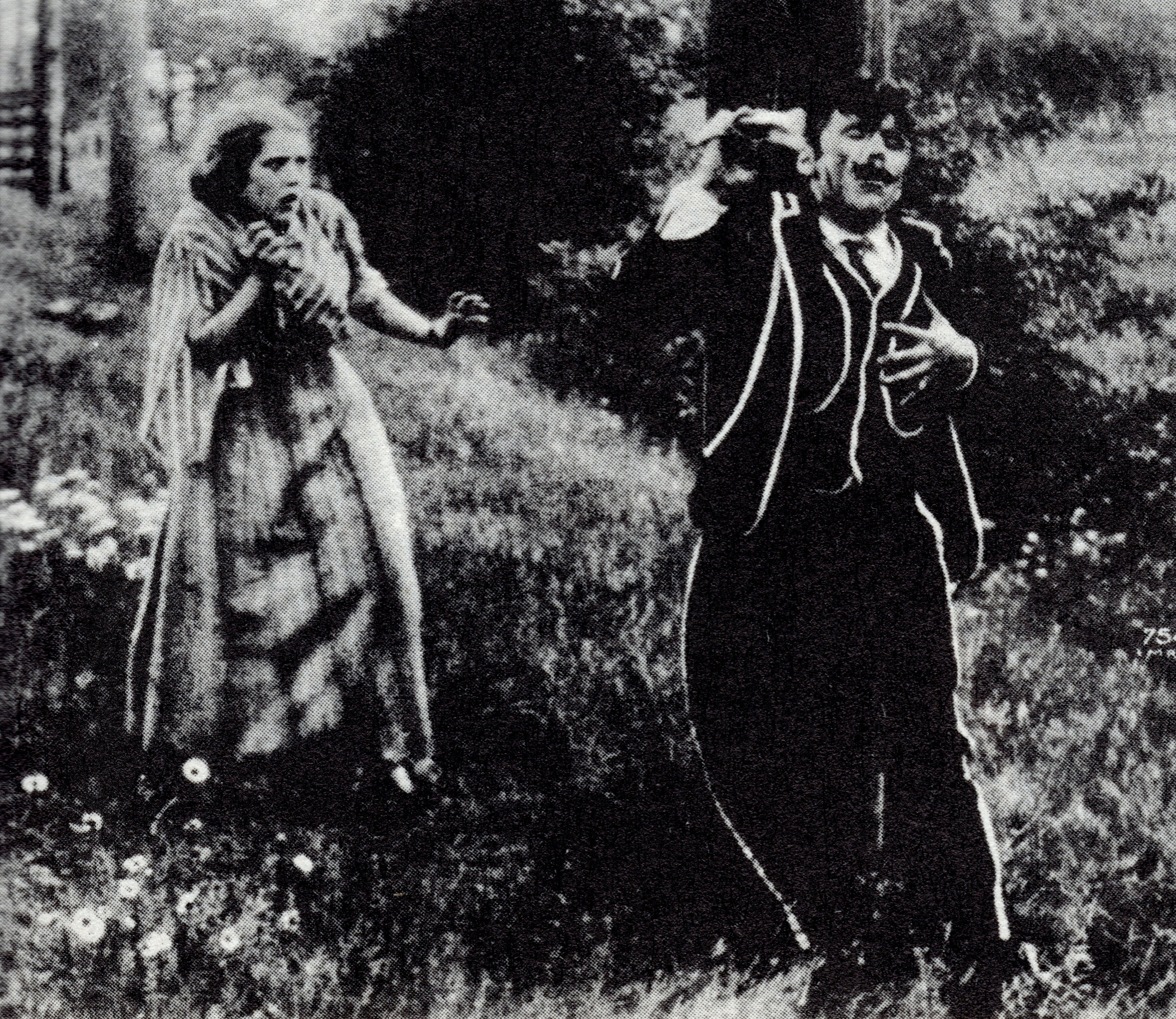
- Film still of Priscilla finding the fatally injured peddler
- Directed by: D. W. Griffith
- Written by: Stanner E.V. Taylor
- Produced by: Biograph Company
- Starring: Mary Pickford
- Cinematography: G. W. Bitzer
- Production company: Biograph Company
- Distributed by: Biograph Company
- Release date: August 1, 1910
- Running time: 16 minutes (16 frame/s)
- Country: United States
- Language: Silent (English intertitles)

An Arcadian Maid – full film

An Arcadian Maid is a 1910 American silent drama film directed by D. W. Griffith and starring Mary Pickford. It was produced and distributed by the Biograph Company.

== Plot ==
Priscilla is newly hired at a farm and is told to wash clothes using a washboard. When a peddler arrives, she takes him to the farmer's wife. After making a sale, he gives Priscilla a ring and a kiss before departing.

He then loses his money, and more, at craps. To pay his gambling debt, he returns to the maid, looking for money. She has none, but she has seen the farmer hide his money in a sock which he puts under his pillow. The peddler persuades her to steal it by promising to take her away and marry her. After she has given him the money, he tells her to meet him later, but he instead takes the next train. The girl takes off a necklace with a cross on it. After waiting at the rendezvous, Priscilla finally realizes she has been tricked. From two passersby, she learns where the train station is. She runs there, but misses the train carrying the peddler away. He gets into a fight with another passenger and is thrown off the train. She finds him, but he tries to strike her before dying from his injuries. Priscilla takes the stolen money and returns it to its hiding place without disturbing her sleeping employer. Later, she puts the necklace back on.

== Cast ==
- Mary Pickford as Priscilla
- Mack Sennett as The Peddler
- George Nichols as The Man of the House
- Kate Bruce as The Lady of the House
- William J. Butler as Second Man
- Charles Craig as Man in Gambling Hall
- Edward Dillon as Man in Gambling Hall
- John T. Dillon as Man in Gambling Hall (as Jack Dillon)
- Frank Evans as First Man
- Francis J. Grandon as Man on Train
- Joseph Graybill as Man in Gambling Hall
- Henry Lehrman as Man in Gambling Hall
- W. Chrystie Miller as Man on Train
- Anthony O'Sullivan as Man on Train
- Alfred Paget as Man on Train
- Vivian Prescott as Woman in Gambling Hall

== Analysis ==
Paolo Cherchi Usai, a director, writer and former longtime senior curator of motion pictures at the George Eastman Museum, noted that this was a very atypical role for Pickford: "a country maid who is neither attractive nor intelligent ... a character who lacks the very essence of Pickford's primary performance stye: energy and spontaneity."

== See also ==
- List of American films of 1910
