= Leonora von Ottinger =

American actress

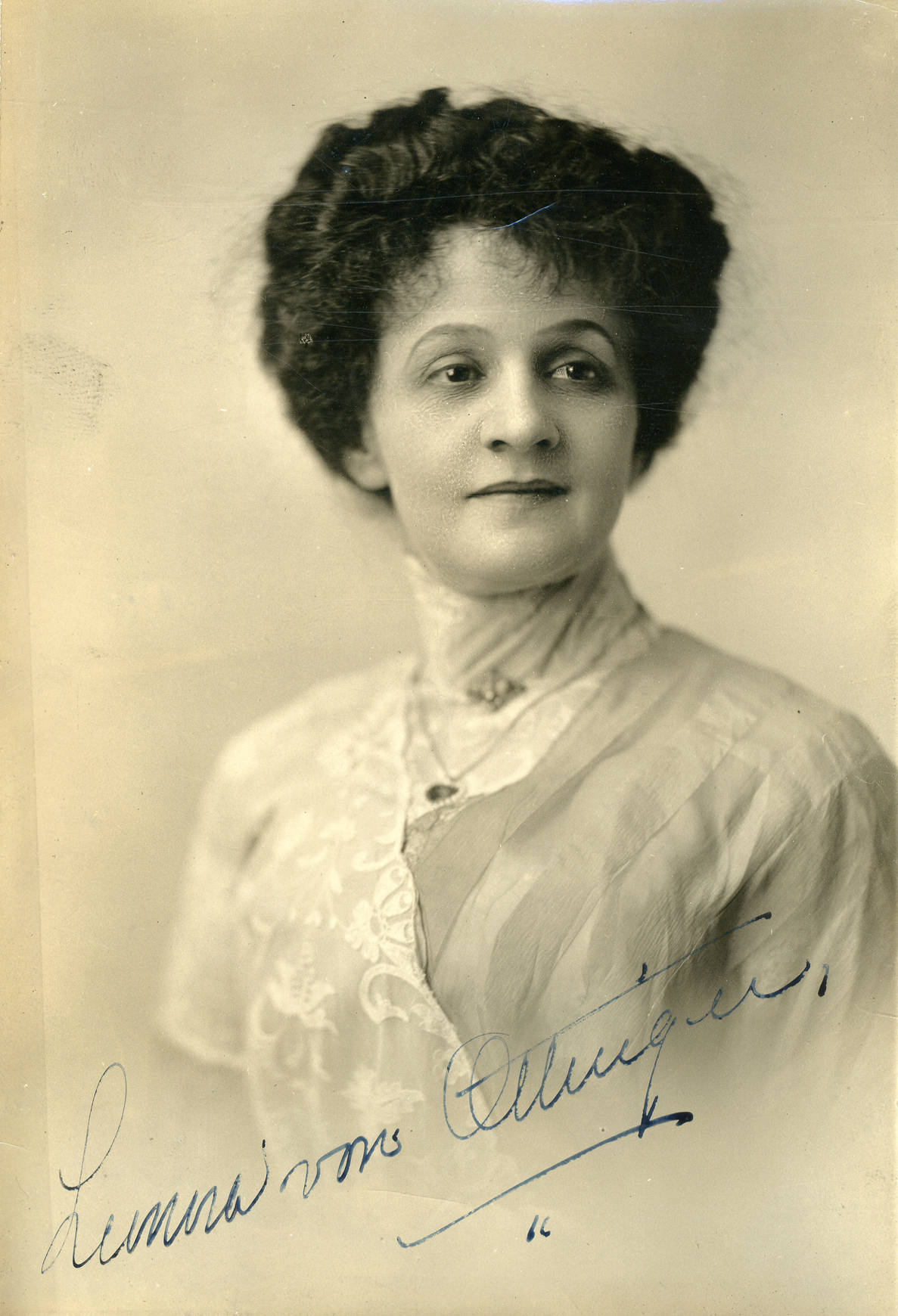
- Occupation(s): Film, stage actress

Leonora von Ottinger was an American silent film and stage actress. She only starred in 16 films in total and concentrated on stage acting.

On Broadway, von Ottinger appeared in The Melting Pot (1909). She starred alongside William Garwood in a number of short films.

Her spouse was Benjamin Von Ottinger of Larchmont New York.

== Filmography ==
- The Spender (1913)
- His Wife's Child (1913)
- Unto the Third Generation (1913)
- The Matchmakers (1915)
- Vanity Thy Name Is? (1916)
- The Littlest Magdalene (1916)
- Her Husband's Honor (1916)
- A Wife at Bay (1916)
- The Narrow Path (1916)
- The Tell-Tale Step (1917)
- One Bride Too Many (1917)
- A Proxy Husband (1919)
- The Frisky Mrs. Johnson (1920) - Mrs. Birkenread
- The Gilded Lily (1921)
- The Miracle of Manhattan (1921)
