= The House with Closed Shutters =

1910 film directed by D. W. Griffith

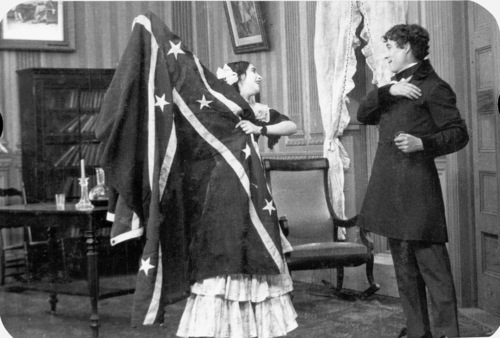
- Still of Dorothy West and Henry B. Walthall
- Directed by: D. W. Griffith
- Written by: Emmett C. Hall
- Starring: Henry B. Walthall
- Cinematography: G. W. Bitzer
- Distributed by: Biograph Company
- Release date: August 8, 1910
- Running time: 16 minutes (original length 998 feet)
- Country: United States
- Language: Silent (English intertitles)

The House with Closed Shutters – full film

The House with Closed Shutters is a 1910 American silent drama film directed by D. W. Griffith and released by the Biograph Company. Prints of The House with Closed Shutters exist in the film archives of the Museum of Modern Art, George Eastman House, and the Library of Congress.

== Plot ==
During the American Civil War a young soldier loses his nerve in battle and runs away to his home to hide. There his sister puts on his uniform, takes her brother's place in the battle, and is killed. Their mother, not wanting the shameful truth to become known, closes all the shutters (hence the film's title) and keeps her son's presence a secret for many years, until two boyhood chums stumble upon the truth.

== Cast ==
- Henry B. Walthall as The Confederate Soldier
- Grace Henderson as His Mother
- Dorothy West as His Sister
- Joseph Graybill as Her Suitor
- Charles West as Her Suitor
- William J. Butler as The Colored Servant (credited as W. J. Butler)
- Edwin August
- Verner Clarges as In Lee's Tent
- John T. Dillon as On Porch / At Farewell / In Lee's Tent (credited as Jack Dillon)
- Gladys Egan as On Porch / At Farewell
- Frank Evans as In Lee's Tent
- Francis J. Grandon as In Lee's Tent
- Alfred Paget as On Porch / At Farewell
- Mabel Van Buren as On Porch / At Farewell

== Production ==
The drama was filmed between June 25 and July 2, 1910. Interior scenes were shot at Biograph's studio at 11 East 14th Street in Manhattan, New York, and outdoor footage was taken on location in Fort Lee, New Jersey.

== Commentary ==
Unlike the portrayal of women in film serials where they tend to be in peril and need to be saved, West's "sister" character, while dressed in her brother's uniform, was in control of her situation as she rode over the same dangerous route that her brother had taken in his flight. Her horsemanship is emphasized over the other male riders, as soon as she is on the horse she rides at full speed and she alone among the riders has her horse rear up on its hind legs.

== See also ==
- List of American films of 1910
- 1910 in film
