= Beatrice Morse =

American screenwriter

- Occupation: Screenwriter
- Years active: 1912–1918

Beatrice Morse was a screenwriter of silent films in the 1910s.

== Biography ==
She was employed as a scenarist at World Pictures, Goldwyn Pictures, and Fox. Before making a name for herself in Hollywood, she wrote for a number of magazines.

== Selected filmography ==
- Humility (1918)
- Who Knows? (1917)
- Mrs. Matthews, Dressmaker (1912)
