= Charles Inslee =

American actor

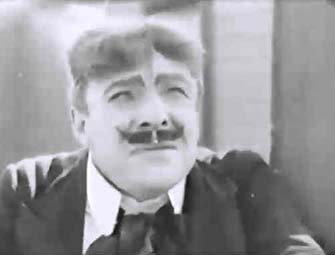
- Inslee in 1914
- Born: Charles Edwin Inslee; January 6, 1870; New York City, New York, U.S.
- Died: September 17, 1922 (aged 52)
- Occupation: Film actor
- Years active: 1908–1921
- Spouse(s): Belle Stokes (m. 1893; div. 1898); Violet June Watson (m. 1914; div. 1914)

Charles Edwin Inslee (January 6, 1870 – September 17, 1922) was an American actor. He appeared in 127 films between 1908 and 1921.

== Biography ==
Born in New York City, Inslee was the son of Mr. and Mrs. Robert C. Inslee of Jamaica Plain, Massachusetts.

Inslee debuted on stage in 1892 as an understudy in Boston in the Grand Opera House Company's production of Rosedale. He first acted in films in 1908, and found work with the Edison, Essanay, Biograph, Bison and Kalem studios. He acted in films alongside Charlie Chaplin, Harold Lloyd that were directed by Edwin S. Porter, D.W. Griffith.

In 1893, Inslee married actress Belle Stokes while the two were performing with the Grand Opera House Company. In 1898, she successfully sued Inslee for divorce, gaining the right to resume her maiden name. In 1914, he married Violet June Ake (née Watson), sister of actress Barbara La Marr. Months later, she too divorced Inslee, on the grounds that he was "not only a peculiar man, but cruel in not letting her hug, caress and kiss him." Inslee died on September 17, 1922.

== Selected filmography ==
Year	Title	Role	Other Players	Filmed in/Notes
1908	Skinner's Finish			
1908	The Call of the Wild			
1908	The Bandit's Waterloo			
1908	After Many Years			
1908	The Greaser's Gauntlet	Bill Gates		
1908	The Man and the Woman			
1908	For Love of Gold			
1908	For a Wife's Honor	Irving Robertson		
1908	The Girl and the Outlaw			
1908	A Calamitous Elopement			
1908	Behind the Scenes	a manager		
1908	The Red Girl			
1908	The Adventures of Dollie	a gypsy		
1908	Where the Breakers Roar			
1908	The Stolen Jewels			
1908	The Zulu's Heart			
1908	Father Gets in the Game			
1908	The Vaquero's Vow			
1908	The Planter's Wife			
1908	The Pirate's Gold			
1908	The Guerrilla			
1908	The Feud and the Turkey			
1908	The Test of Friendship			
1908	The Christmas Burglars			
1908	Mr. Jones at the Ball			
1909	One Touch of Nature			
1909	Love Finds a Way			
1909	The Golden Louis			
1909	The Criminal Hypnotist			
1909	The Fascinating Mrs. Francis			
1909	Mr. Jones Has a Card Party			
1909	The Welcome Burglar			
1909	The Cord of Life			
1909	The Girls and Daddy			
1909	The Brahma Diamond			
1909	A Wreath in Time			
1909	Tragic Love			
1913	Mabel's Dramatic Career	Film Director		
1913	When Dreams Come True			
1913	A Quiet Little Wedding	Rival		
1913	The Riot			
1914	Making a Living	Newspaper Editor		
1915	Work	Izzy A. Wake, a painter		
1915	A Woman	The Father		
1915	The Bank	President of the bank		
1915	A Night in the Show	Tuba Player		
1919	He Leads, Others Follow			
1919	Pay Your Dues			
1919	His Only Father			
1921	The Man Who Woke Up			
