= Romance of a Jewess =

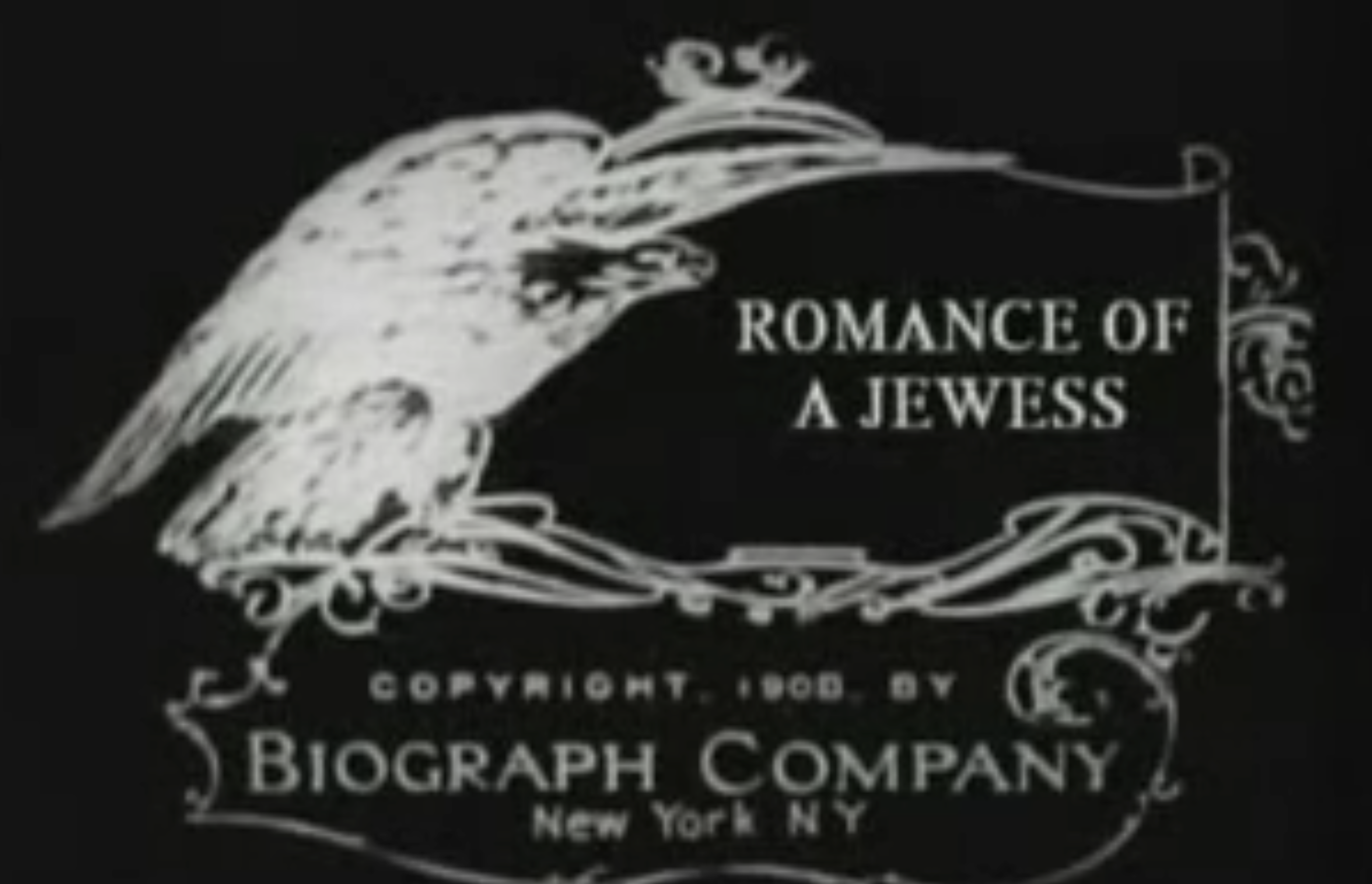
- Title page
- Directed by: D. W. Griffith
- Written by: D. W. Griffith
- Starring: Florence Lawrence; George Gebhardt; Gladys Egan
- Cinematography: G. W. Bitzer
- Distributed by: American Mutoscope and Biograph Company
- Release date: October 23, 1908
- Running time: 15 minutes (original release length 964 feet)
- Country: United States
- Language: Silent with English intertitles

Romance of a Jewess is a 1908 American silent short drama film written and directed by D. W. Griffith.

== Plot ==
Ruth Simonson and her father are grief-stricken by the death of her mother. They then resume work at their pawn shop. A steady stream of customers come and go, including one young man who has to part with various items of clothing to try to raise the sum he needs. However, when he starts taking off his pants, the father stops him and gives him the money. A young bookstore owner redeems some books. He and the daughter are attracted to each other, and he kisses her hand. The annoyed father drives him away. A matchmaker arrives with a suitor for the daughter; her father approves, but she vehemently rejects the man. Angered, the father goes to see the man she likes. After some resistance the man agrees to give Ruth up, but quickly changes his mind and returns to the pawn shop. There he embraces Ruth. Ruth's father gives her an ultimatum: him or her beau. She chooses love, and despite her pleadings, is ordered to leave.

Romance of a Jewess

The couple's happiness comes to a tragic end. While climbing a ladder to stock the shelves of his store, the young man falls and dies. Ruth is forced to sell the books and leave with her young daughter for a life of poverty.

Sick and bedridden, Ruth sends her daughter to pawn something. The girl goes to the shop of her grandfather. He recognizes the item. At first, he is still furious at his daughter, but the tears of his granddaughter soften his heart, and he goes to Ruth. They are reconciled, but then she dies moments later.

== Cast ==
- Florence Lawrence as Ruth Simonson
- George Gebhardt as Simon Bimberg
- Gladys Egan as The Daughter
- John R. Cumpson as Customer
- Guy Hedlund
- Arthur V. Johnson as In Bookstore/Matchmaker
- Alfred Paget
- Mack Sennett as Customer/In Bookstore/Doctor
- Harry Solter as Customer/Rubinstein
