= The Kentuckian (1908 film) =

1908 film directed by Wallace McCutcheon, Sr.

- Directed by: Wallace McCutcheon Sr.
- Written by: Augustus Marvin (play); Stanner E.V. Taylor (scenario)
- Produced by: American Mutoscope & Biograph
- Cinematography: G.W. Bitzer; Arthur Marvin
- Distributed by: American Mutoscope & Biograph
- Release date: July 7, 1908 (USA)
- Running time: 757 feet
- Country: United States
- Languages: Silent; English intertitles

The Kentuckian is a 1908 short silent black-and-white Western film directed by Wallace McCutcheon, Sr. and starring Edward Dillon, Florence Auer and Mack Sennett.

The plot centers on the marriage between the titular white Kentuckian and an American Indian woman. The film provides a type of Indian hero, in the form of a "squaw's devotion and sacrifice."

== Plot ==
Plot summary taken from The Show World magazine.

Ward Fatherly, the son of a wealthy Kentuckian family, plays poker with some friends. Ward loses, but he discovers that another gambler is cheating. The two men duel with pistols, and Ward kills his adversary.

Ward flees to the Western frontier, where he lies low and works as a miner. At the mining camp's tavern, he meets a young American Indian woman selling goods. He also pays for a round of drinks, revealing to others that he is flush with cash. Two men rob and beat up Ward. He is saved by the young woman, who nurses him back to health. They fall in love, marry, and eventually have a son.

After several years, a friend arrives to inform Ward that his father has died, leaving Ward as the sole heir to the family fortune. However, Ward decides to stay on the frontier, as he doesn't believe his wife would be accepted in high society. Realizing this, Ward's wife kills herself so that he can return home.

== Cast ==
- Edward Dillon as Ward Fatherly
- Florence Auer
- D. W. Griffith as Card Sharp
- George Gebhardt
- Harry Solter
- Mack Sennett
- Anthony O'Sullivan
- John G. Adolfi
- Wallace McCutcheon Jr.
- Robert G. Vignola
