= Gladys Egan =

American actress (1900–1985)

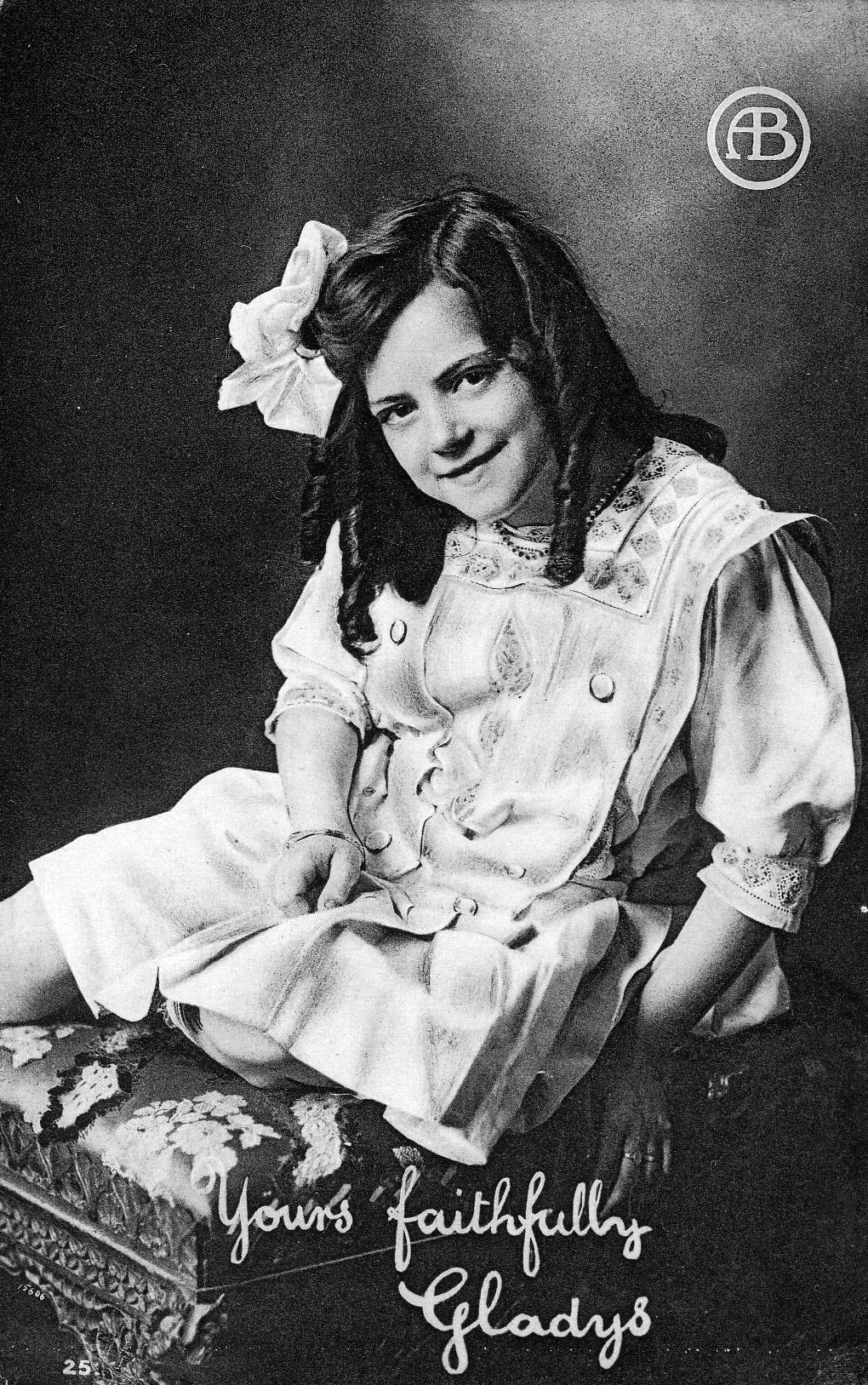
- Egan c. 1910
- Born: Gladys Mary Egan; May 24, 1900; New York City, U.S.
- Died: March 8, 1985 (aged 84); Lemon Grove, California, U.S.
- Occupation: Actress
- Years active: 1907-1914
- Spouse(s): Name undetermined (m. 1920–div. before 1930); John Edson Jacoby (m. 1935–1948; his death); Melvin Babbitt Rice (m. 1960–1960; his death)
- Children: 1

Gladys Egan (also credited as Gladys Eagan; May 24, 1900 – March 8, 1985) was an early 20th-century American child actress, who between 1907 and 1914 performed professionally in theatre productions as well as in scores of silent films. She began her brief entertainment career appearing on the New York stage as well as in plays presented across the country by traveling companies. By 1908 she also started working in the film industry, where for six years she acted almost exclusively in motion pictures for the Biograph Company of New York. The vast majority of her screen roles during that period were in shorts directed by D. W. Griffith, who cast her in over 90 of his releases. While most of Egan's films were produced by Biograph, she did work for other motion-picture companies between 1911 and 1914, such as the Reliance Film Company and Independent Moving Pictures. By 1916, Egan's acting career appears to have ended, and she no longer was being mentioned in major trade journals or included in published studio personnel directories as a regularly employed actor. Although she may have performed as an extra or in some bit parts after 1914, no available filmographies or entertainment publications from the period cite Egan in any screen or stage role after that year.

== Early life and stage work ==
Born in Manhattan, New York in May 1900, Gladys was the fifth child of seven children of Margarette (née Sheeran) and Thomas Francis Egan, both New York natives whose own parents had immigrated from Ireland. By 1910, the large Egan family was living at 425 West 30th Street in Manhattan and was supported by Thomas's job as a "letter carrier" for the United States Postal Service.

The circumstances of young Gladys's entry into show business are uncertain, but by the age of seven she was performing on Broadway. In October and early November 1907, credited as Gladys Eagan, she portrayed the character "Ne-Ne-Moo-Sha" in the two-act musical comedy Miss Pocahontas, which was presented at the Lyric Theatre on 42nd Street in Manhattan. During this period, the young actress was also a regular cast member in stage productions outside of New York. In its November 23, 1907 issue, the weekly entertainment newspaper The New York Clipper lists Egan as a cast member in the Samuel S. & Lee Shubert Company's presentation of the play Shore Acres, which was scheduled for a three-week engagement in Boston.

=== 1908–1909 travels ===
Throughout 1908 and into early 1909, Egan performed on tour in additional presentations of Shore Acres and in at least two other plays: Rip Van Winkle starring the popular New York actor Thomas Jefferson and The Wishing Ring featuring Marguerite Clark. In those tours, Egan received many accolades for her performances in towns and cities in California, Utah, Colorado, North Dakota, Pennsylvania, and Montreal, Canada. In his mixed assessment of Rip Van Winkle, reviewer Walter Anthony in the January 25, 1909 issue of The San Francisco Call focuses special attention on the production's child actors, noting that their portrayals of the play's characters as children were, in his opinion, far superior to the older versions of the same characters performed by adult actors. "Little Meenie [Egan] and Little Heindrich in the first act", he writes, "were good juvenile roles in the hands of Gladys Egan and Oscar Johnson, but not so good when their grownups [sic] selves appeared in the fourth act stagily and rhetorical. A month later, when Rip Van Winkle was scheduled to be presented in Grand Junction, Colorado, the local newspaper heaped even greater praise on Egan:

In support of Thomas Jefferson, who is to appear at the Park opera house, Monday, March 1, in "Rip Van Winkle,” is one of the youngest actresses on the American stage. It is little Miss Gladys Egan, who plays the part of Meenie. She is only 7 years old, (Note: Actually on the date of this cited newspaper notice, 26 February 1909, Gladys Egan was less than three months away from her ninth birthday.) yet she plays a part which in length would puzzle many an older actress and is one of the principals in the support of Mr. Jefferson. Another remarkable child actor is Oscar Johnson, who is three years older...The pretty little juvenile actors are under the competent care of a guardian who travels with them all the time.

In other news coverage about Egan's stage work in 1909, The Salt Lake Herald in Utah described the "little" actress as "one of the stars of the performance" of Rip Van Winkle and judged her acting style as highly effective for her age. "The emotional tremor in her voice as she expostulated over the ejection of her father", observed the newspaper, "was truly mindful of the great actresses who get their names in big letters on the billboards."

== Film career ==
In 1908 and 1909, when Egan was having success on the stage, she also ventured into acting in the rapidly expanding industry of motion pictures. Her initial screen performance was for the Biograph Company in the Summer of 1908. Contrary to some current online filmographies relating to Egan, published biographies of D. W. Griffith, production records included in the 1985 reference D. W. Griffith and the Biograph Company, and other period sources cite the drama short Behind the Scenes as her first work for the New York studio. The eight-minute short, directed by Griffith, was filmed in two days–August 10 and 13, 1908–at the company's main studio at 11 East 14th Street in Manhattan. Released on September 11, the film was promoted by Biograph in advertisements as "a true and pathetic story of life in Stageland, where all that glitters is not gold."

=== The Adventures of Dollie ===
In the cinematic history of the United States, the 1908 Biograph short The Adventures of Dollie is deemed notable because it is generally recognized as D. W. Griffith's debut film as a director. (Note: The title of Griffith's debut film as a director is variously listed as either The Adventures of Dollie or more simply as Adventures of Dollie. The latter title is used both on the title card of the prints distributed to theaters in 1908 and in the catalogs of the Library of Congress, the UCLA Film and Television Archive, and other in repositories. In 1908 trade publications and in original Biograph advertisements the title The Adventures of Dollie is used predominantly.) Some online references also cite The Adventures of Dollie as Gladys Egan's first film as a screen actor. She is not listed as a cast member of that production in any of the previously noted sources or in the catalog profiles of surviving copies of the short preserved in the UCLA Film Archives and the Library of Congress. As presented in those copies of The Adventures of Dollie, the child actress who portrays the title character does not appear to be Egan, who by the Summer of 1908 was eight years old. The girl in the film looks younger than that age, and her short hairstyle and facial features do not resemble those of Egan at the time. Even the previously cited reference D. W. Griffith and the Biograph Company, which among its many sources includes performance credits for Egan drawn from the studio's production records, does not credit her or any other child actor for the role of Dollie. Instead, that reference indicates that the performer is unknown, applying only a question mark ("?") to the title role. Egan herself also made no mention of this film in a self-compiled 1965 list of her leading roles.

=== Continuing work at Biograph, 1908–1913 ===
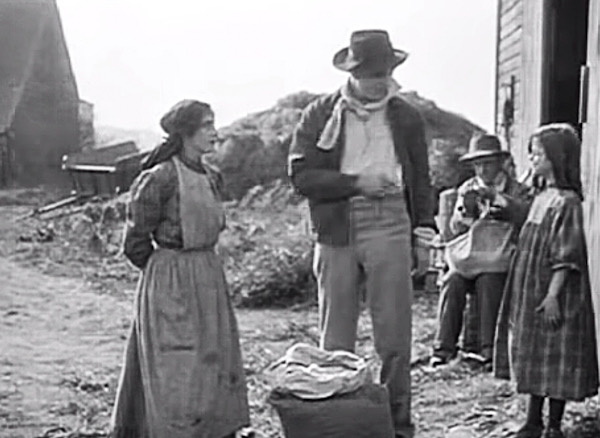
Biograph release A Corner in Wheat (1909) with actors (from left) Linda Arvidson, James Kirkwood, W. Chrystie Miller (rear), and Egan

Despite any issues regarding the identity of Egan's first film, her initial work for Biograph must have impressed Griffith because he cast her in dozens of productions over the next five years, mostly in melodramas. A few examples of Egan's films are Behind the Scenes (1908), Romance of a Jewess (1908), After Many Years (1908), The Lonely Villa (1909), The Country Doctor (1909), The Seventh Day (1909), The Rocky Road (1910), The Broken Doll (1910), His Trust Fulfilled (1911), Conscience (1911), A Child's Remorse (1912), The Painted Lady (1912), Fate (1913), and Red and Pete, Partners (1913). By the end of 1913, she had performed in at least 100 Biograph releases working for Griffith as well as for some of the company's other rising directors such as Herbert Brenon, Frank Powell, Anthony O'Sullivan, Edward Dillon, and Mack Sennett. (Note: The given number of Biograph films in which Egan performed was derived by cross-referencing the actress's filmographies in various sources and by examining film stills published in trade publications published between 1908 and 1914. Some of the filmographies examined include lists in An Index to the Creative Work of David Wark Griffith (1944), the catalog of the American Film Institute, the American Silent Feature Film Database of the Library of Congress, the online Silent Era catalog that comprises the Progressive Silent Film List, the Internet Movie Database (IMDb), the UCLA Film Archives, the collection of moving images at the Museum of Modern Art, imprints on the history of the Biograph Company, and other works on the silent-film era in the United States that are cited among the references herein.)

In her 1925 autobiography When the Movies Were Young, silent-film actress Linda Arvidson, who was also D. W. Griffith's first wife, recalls Egan's work for the legendary director at Biograph:

Of the children, little Gladys Egan did remarkable work playing many dramatic leading parts. Her performance in "The Broken Doll" should be recorded here. Adele de Garde was another nine-year-old child wonder. These children were not comiques. They were tragediennes and how they could tear a passion to tatters! The Wolff children sufficed well in infantile roles. Their mother kept a dramatic agency for children.

Egan's number of roles at Biograph steadily declined after 1912. Although there may have been other reasons for her reduced screen work at the company, that same year Mary Pickford introduced Griffith to 19-year-old Lillian Gish and her sister Dorothy, who was four-and-a-half years younger than her sibling. Each of the sisters was described at the time as looking younger than her age, especially Lillian. On her first visit to Biograph in June 1912, Lillian reportedly convinced the studio's casting director that she was only 16 years old, not 19. After meeting the "Gish girls," Griffith soon assigned them co-starring roles in his production An Unseen Enemy, released in September 1912. Their casting in subsequent Biograph films, as well as their rising popularity with theater audiences, may account, at least in part, for Egan's declining number of roles in company productions. The arrival of Lillian and Dorothy likely reduced Egan's opportunities of getting more substantial roles at Biograph as she entered her teenage years.

=== Biograph's anonymous actors ===
In compiling a comprehensive filmography of Egan, a full accounting of her screen appearances and those of other Biograph actors in the early 1900s is made more difficult by the fact that Biograph, as a matter of company policy, did not begin publicly crediting its performers and identifying them in film-industry publications or in newspapers until 1913. In its April 5 issue that year, the Chicago-based trade journal Motography in a news item titled "Biograph Identities Revealed" announces that "at last" Biograph "is ready to make known its players." That news item also informs filmgoers that for the price of ten cents they can purchase a poster from the company that features the names and photographs of 26 of Biograph's principal actors. While Lillian and Dorothy Gish were identified among the group of actors on the poster, Gladys Egan's name and photograph were not included.

=== Egan's work for other studios and her final film ===
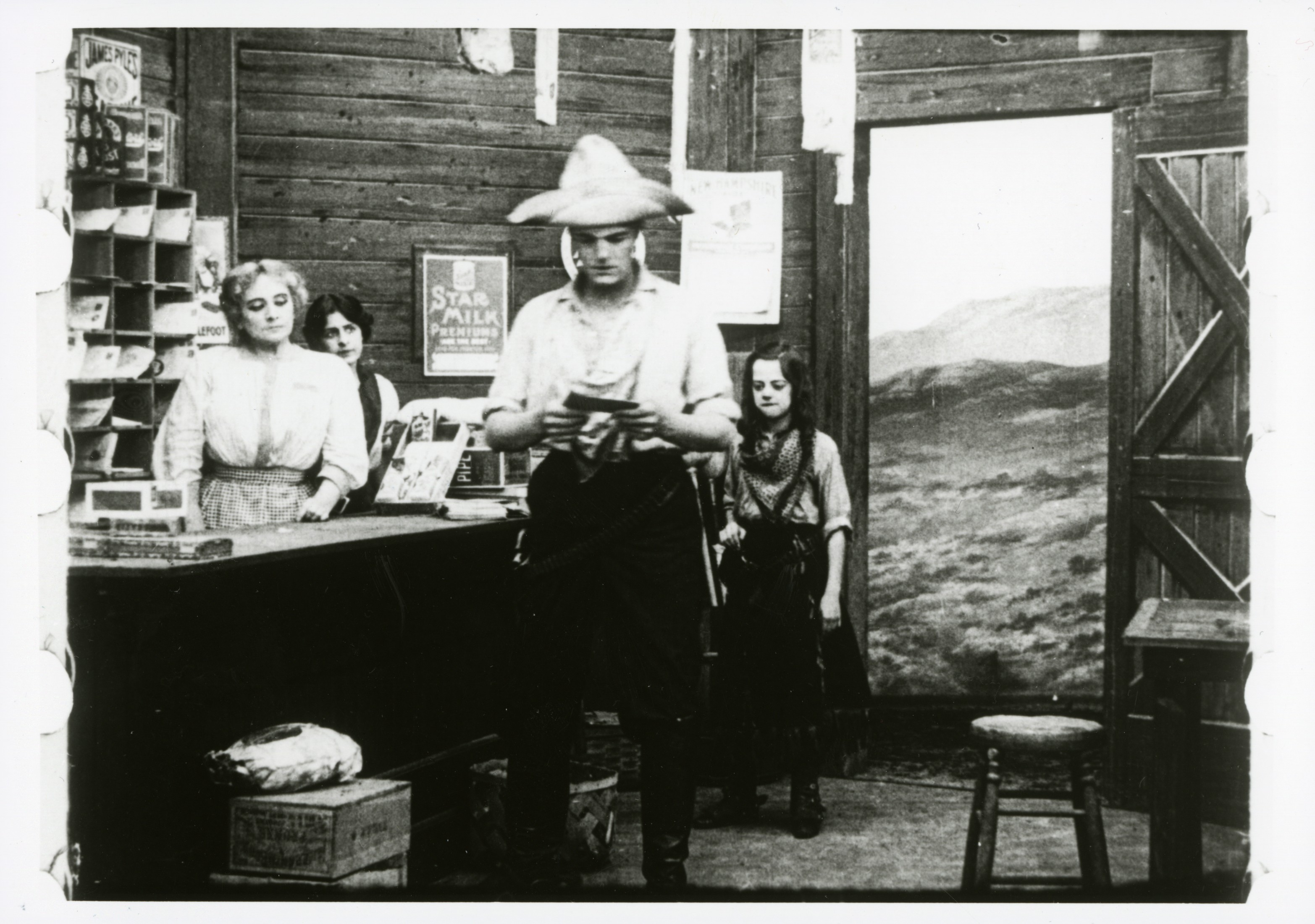
Egan (near doorway) in Two Little Rangers (1912) by Solax

Egan appeared in a small number of productions for several studios other than Biograph. Between 1911 and 1914, she was cast by the Reliance Film Company–also headquartered in Manhattan–in The Empty Crib (1911), His Love of Children (1912), Votes for Women (1912), and Dream House (1913). In the latter film, once again credited as "Gladys Eagan", she was among a cast described as a "Clever Company of Well Known Stage Children", a group that included Runa Hodges, who was billed as "The Prettiest Baby in the World". The Independent Moving Pictures Company of America, more commonly referred to by the acronym "IMP", also cast Egan in four of it releases in 1912: The Romance of an Old Maid; Mrs. Matthews, Dressmaker; All for Her; and The Heart of a Gypsy. Two other film studios that contracted Egan for roles were the Solax Film Company and the Photo Drama Company (PDC). For Solax she performed in the Western Two Little Rangers (1912) under the direction of Alice Guy-Blaché. The next year, at PDC, she portrayed the character Mary Morgan in Ten Nights in a Barroom, a drama directed by Lee Beggs and based on an 1854 temperance novel by Timothy Shay Arthur.

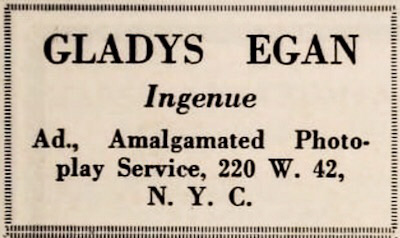
Egan's ad seeking work published in Motion Picture News, 1916

According to a few of her filmographies, after her work for other studios in 1912 and 1913, Egan returned to Biograph to perform in a minor role, again uncredited, in the company's 1914 three-reeler Men and Women co-starring Lionel Barrymore and Blanche Sweet. In that release, possibly Egan's final film, she portrayed one of several orphans in the drama. Two years later, the 16-year-old actress was no longer being mentioned in trade publications or included in studio personnel directories as a regularly employed actor. Nevertheless, in a film-industry directory published in Motion Picture News in October 1916, she still promoted herself in personal advertisements as a specialist in "Ingenue" roles and that she was available for hire through the Amalgamated Photoplay Service of New York City.

== Later years ==
Following the 1916 publication of her personal advertisement seeking acting work, Egan is not mentioned again in available trade journals of the period or in theatre and film sections in local or regional newspapers. Later documentation, however, suggests that after her screen career she remained in New York City, married in 1920, then divorced, and later secured employment outside the entertainment industry. (Note: The first marriage of "Gladys M Eagan" occurred in the latter half of 1920 or possibly in early 1921. That timeframe is based on Eagan's age cited on the line titled "Age at first marriage" in her entry in the 1930 federal census, which documents "20" years old.) The federal decennial census of 1930, in a population survey taken on April 23 at the Wells House, a hotel in Brooklyn, New York, documents a 29-year-old, divorced Gladys M. Eagan residing there with 13 other "guests" and employed as an office secretary. The age of that woman is consistent with the former actress's own birth year and her parents are identified as natives of New York as well. The spelling of "Eagan" was also a common variation of her surname used in her early stage career as well as in film promotions for studios other than Biograph, one example being The Dream House (1913) for the Reliance Film Company. Subsequent census data and other records do show that in the late 1930s Egan left New York and relocated to Detroit, Michigan, where she resided for over a decade. She then moved to California by the early 1950s. No contemporary records, however, have been uncovered that show Egan ever returning to acting in those new locations, either in professional or amateur productions.

== Personal life and death ==
Egan married three times. The details of her first marriage in 1920, as noted, are uncertain. Records do document and confirm that in the mid-1930s she married John Edson Jacoby, a native of Michigan who was an automobile "sales engineer". During their marriage they had one child, a daughter, Joyce Angela Jacoby, who was born in 1936. The federal census of 1940 shows four-year-old Joyce residing with her parents in Detroit, where John continued his work in the automobile industry. Gladys's marriage to him lasted until his death in 1948.

Twelve years after John Jacoby's death, on June 26, 1960, Gladys married Melvin Babbitt Rice in California. Their union was a short one, as Rice died only six months after the wedding. No subsequent records indicate that Egan married again.

The final years of Egan's life were spent in a nursing home in Chula Vista, California. In March 1985, at age 84, she died in the Cresta Loma Convalescent Hospital in nearby Lemon Grove, California, still using the name Gladys Egan Jacoby. Following cremation, her ashes were scattered by the Telophase Society in accordance with her wishes.

== Selected filmography ==
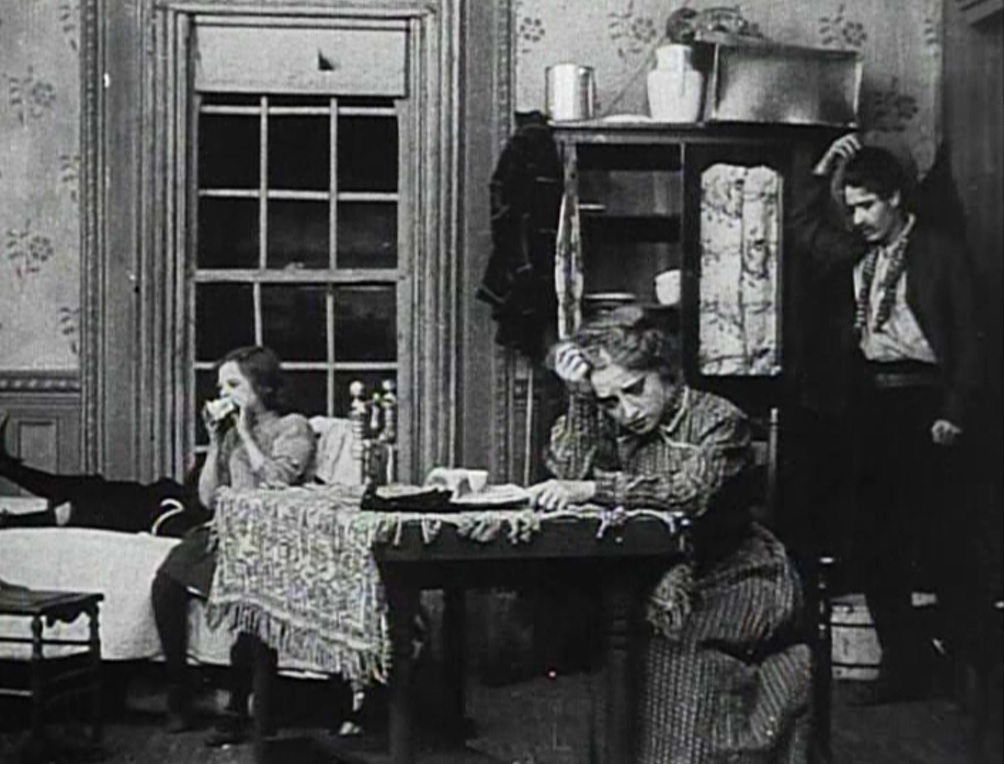
Egan (left) with Marion Leonard and Henry B. Walthall in Biograph's A Trap for Santa Claus (1909)

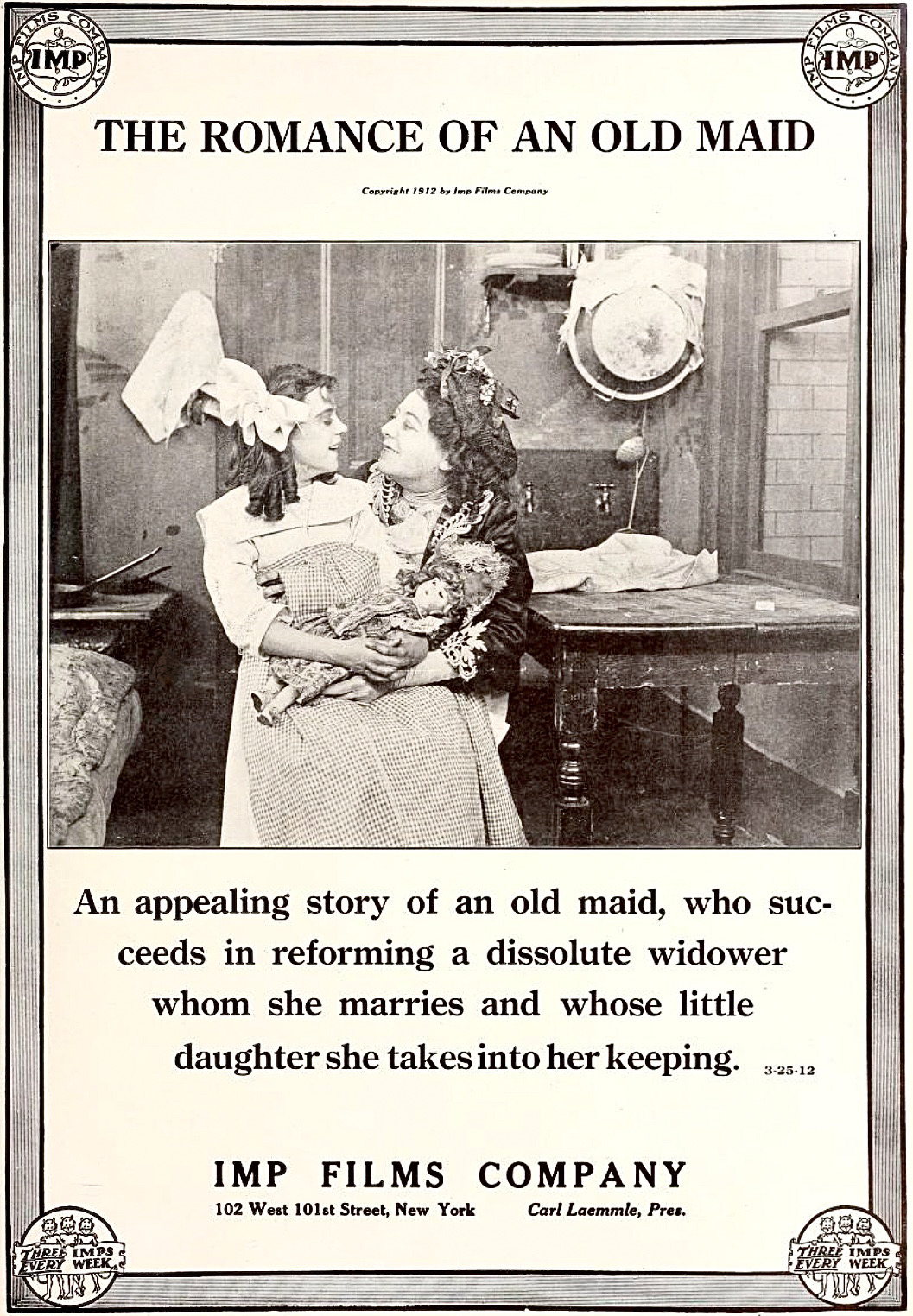
Promotion for 1912 IMP drama featuring Egan sitting on lap of fellow actor Rolinda Bainbridge

Year	Film	Role	Ref.
1908	The Adventures of Dollie	Daughter	
1908	Behind the Scenes	Mrs. Bailey's daughter	
1908	Romance of a Jewess	Daughter	
1908	After Many Years	Davis's child	
1908	The Zulu's Heart	Boer's daughter	
1908	The Vaquero's Vow	Little girl (unnamed)	
1908	An Awful Moment	Mowbrays' daughter	
1909	The Lonely Villa	Cullison's daughter	
1909	The Country Doctor	Edith Harcourt	
1909	A Trap for Santa Claus (also A Trap for Santa)	Rogers' daughter	
1909	In Little Italy	One of the children	
1909	A Corner in Wheat	Poor farmer's daughter	
1909	What's Your Hurry?	Mary's younger sister	
1909	The Faded Lillies (also The Faded Lilies)	Party guest	
1910	The Rocky Road	Child at church	
1910	In the Border States	Younger sister	
1910	The House with Closed Shutters	On porch/at farewell	
1910	His Sister-in-Law	Blanche, Eva's sister	
1910	Little Angels of Luck	Alice Rose	
1910	One Night, and Then	One of the children	
1910	The House with Closed Shutters	Little Girl Outside House	
1910	A Salutary Lesson	Randalls' child	
1910	The Unchanging Sea	Child daughter	
1911	His Trust Fulfilled	Little orphan	
1911	The Making of a Man	In first audience	
1911	Conscience	The child	
1911	Paradise Lost	Pete's daughter	
1911	The Broken Doll	Little Indian girl	
1911	The Two Sides	Rancher's daughter	
1912	Mrs. Matthews, Dressmaker	Little Jennie Matthews	
1912	The Romance of an Old Maid	Little Lucille Rogers	
1912	The Inner Circle	Little girl (unnamed)	
1912	The Painted Lady	Little girl in arbor	
1912	The Sunbeam	One of the children	
1912	Two Little Rangers	Gladys Paxton	
1913	McGann and His Octette	Younger McGann daughter	
1913	The Dream House	Unverified	
1914	Men and Women	Orphan	
