= The Master Cracksman =

1914 American drama film

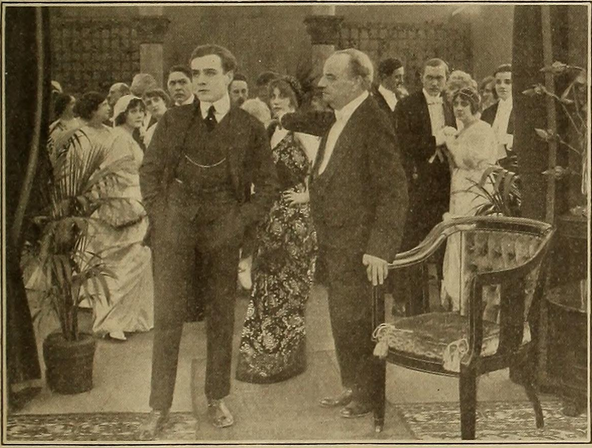
- Still from film
- Directed by: Harry Carey
- Written by: Harry Carey
- Produced by: Harry Carey
- Starring: Harry Carey
- Cinematography: David W. Gobbett
- Release date: June 10, 1914
- Running time: 72 minutes
- Country: United States
- Language: Silent with English intertitles

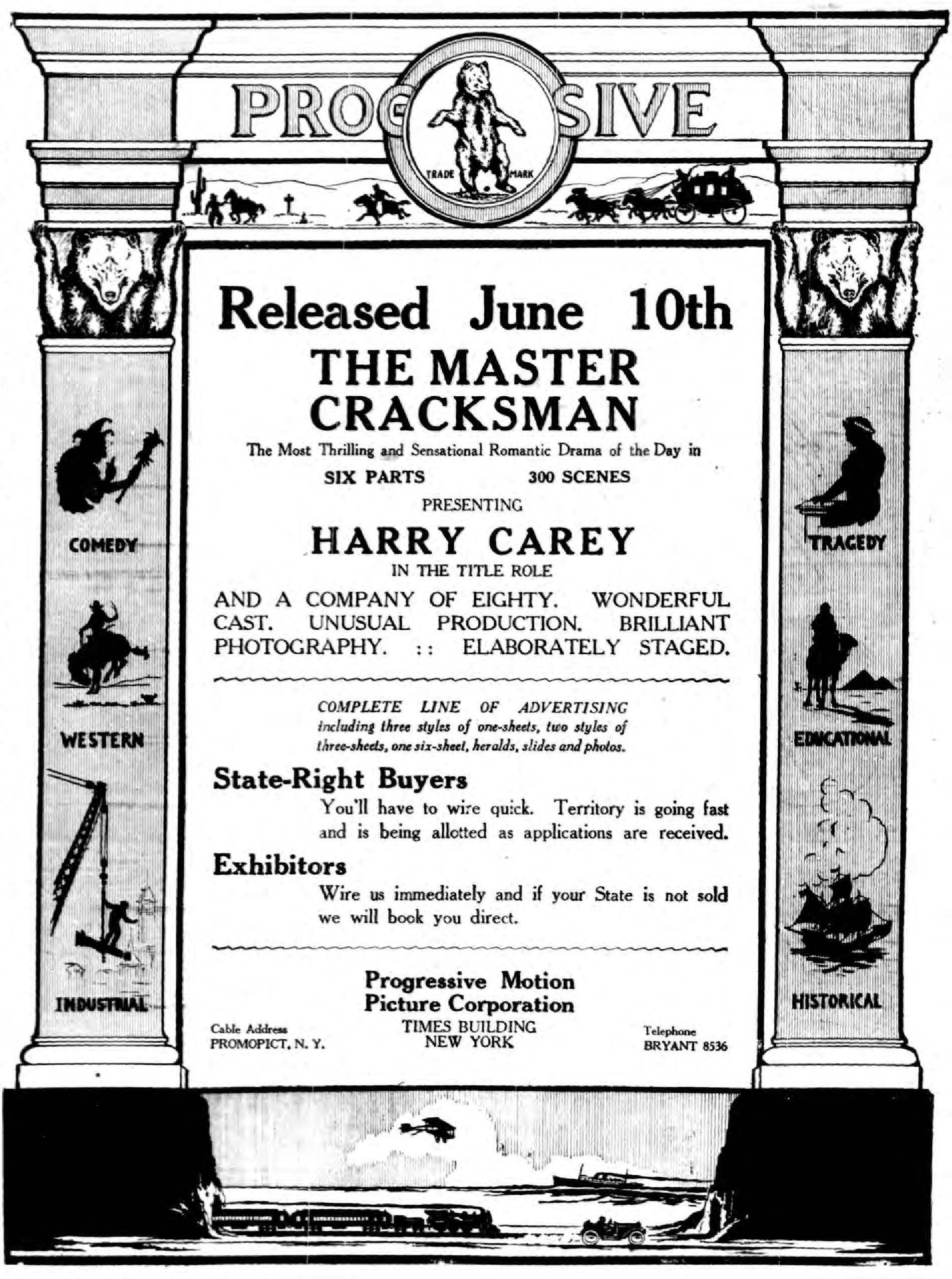
Advertisement for the film in June 10, 1914 issue of Variety

The Master Cracksman is a 1914 American drama film featuring Harry Carey.

== Background ==
The film was the first production of the Progressive Motion Picture Corporation, and was based on a story and play. It was written, directed, and produced by Harry Carey. The film was reissued in 1915 as The Martin Mystery and in 1920 as The Square Shooter.

As of December 2016, the U.S. Library of Congress has listed the film as lost.

== Cast ==
- Harry Carey as Joe "Gentleman Joe", the Cracksman
- E.A. Lock as The Uncle
- Rexford Burnett as Harold Martin
- Fern Foster as Harold's Sister
- Marjorie Bonner as Violet Dane
- Gregory Allen as Office Jim Buckley
- Juliette Day as June Day
- Roland De Castro as Redman Day
- Hayward Mack as District Attorney
- Louis Morrell as Robert Kendall
- William H. Power as Nicholas Moses
- Herbert Russell as Captain Dan McRae

== See also ==
- Harry Carey filmography
