= The Gilded Lily (1921 film) =

1921 film by Robert Zigler Leonard

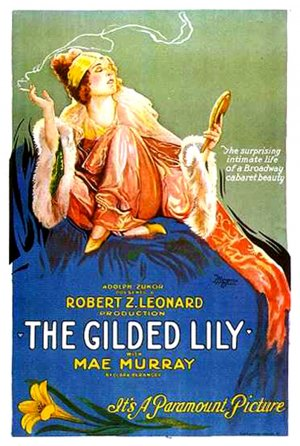
- Theatrical release poster
- Directed by: Robert Z. Leonard
- Screenplay by: Clara Beranger; Tom McNamara
- Produced by: Adolph Zukor; Robert Z. Leonard
- Starring: Mae Murray; Lowell Sherman; Jason Robards Sr. Charles K. Gerrard; Leonora von Ottinger
- Cinematography: Ernest Haller
- Production company: Famous Players–Lasky Corporation
- Distributed by: Paramount Pictures
- Release date: March 6, 1921
- Running time: 70 minutes
- Country: United States
- Language: Silent (English intertitles)

The Gilded Lily is a surviving 1921 American silent drama film directed by Robert Z. Leonard and written by Clara Beranger and Tom McNamara. The film stars Mae Murray, Lowell Sherman, Jason Robards Sr., Charles K. Gerrard, and Leonora von Ottinger. The film was released on March 6, 1921, by Paramount Pictures.

== Plot ==
A young man from the country goes to a big city where he falls in love with a showgirl. She then decides to give up her profession to become a housewife, and he decides to leave her.

== Cast ==
- Mae Murray as Lillian Drake
- Lowell Sherman as Creighton Howard
- Jason Robards Sr. as Frank Thompson
- Charles K. Gerrard as John Stewart
- Leonora von Ottinger as Mrs. Thompson

== Production ==
The opening scene with Mae Murray wearing a gold tinsel cloth costume in front of a deep blue background was shot using the Prizma color system.

== Censorship ==
Initially, The Gilded Lily was rejected in its entirety by the Kansas Board of Review, but was approved for release after numerous eliminations.

== Preservation status ==
A print survives in Museo del Cine Buenos Aires, Pablo C. Ducros Hicken archive.
