= The Children of the Feud =

The Children of the Feud (aka:The Feud Breakers)
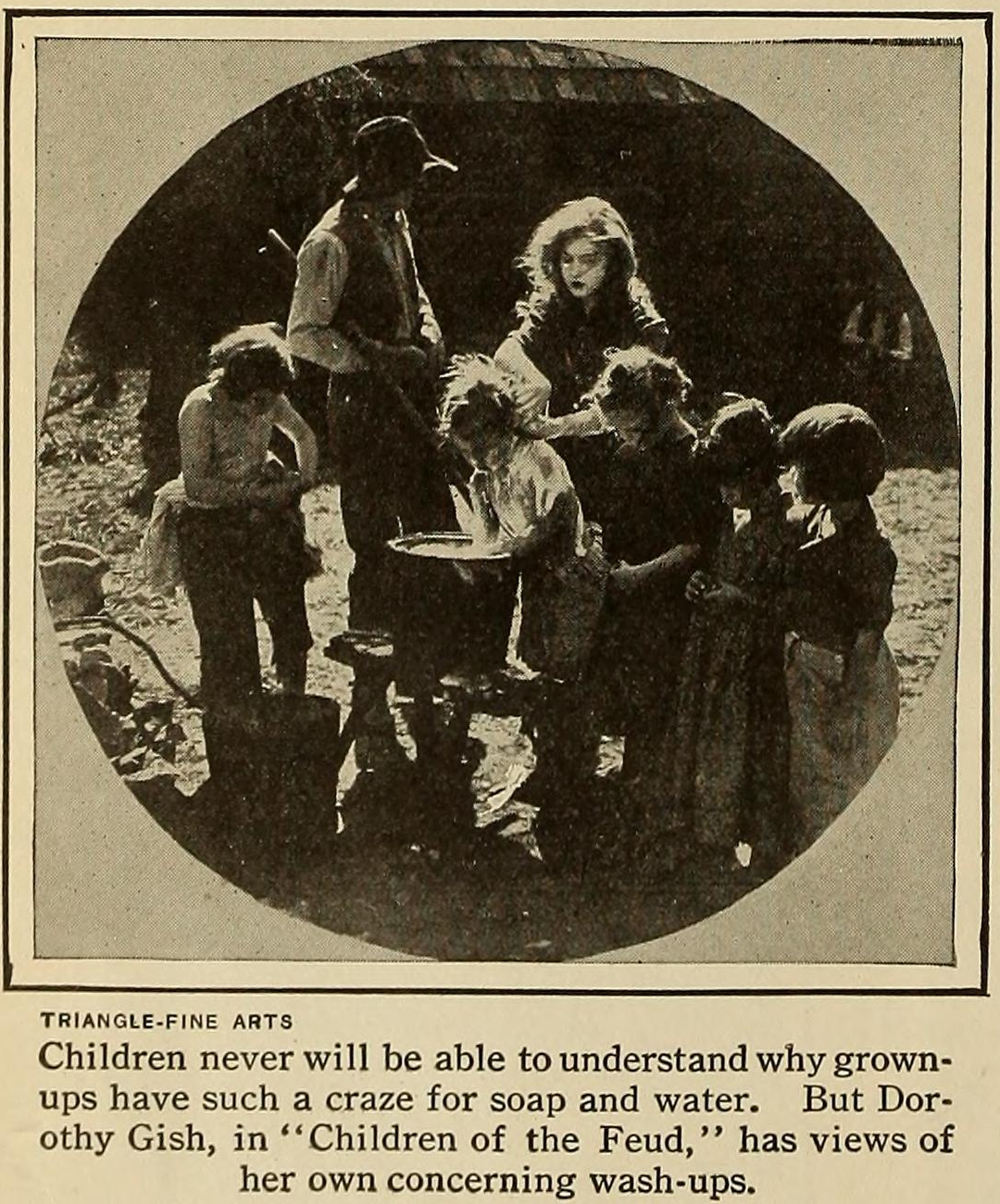
- Directed by: Joseph Henabery
- Written by: Bernard McConville
- Starring: Charles Gorman; Dorothy Gish
- Edited by: William Shea
- Production company: Fine Arts Film Company
- Distributed by: Triangle Film Corporation
- Release date: December 2, 1916
- Running time: 5 reels
- Country: USA
- Language: Silent..English titles

The Children of the Feud is a lost 1916 silent film drama directed by Joseph Henabery. It was produced by D. W. Griffith (his Fine Arts Film Company) and released through Triangle Film Corporation.

== Cast ==
- Charles Gorman - Pap Clayton
- Dorothy Gish - Sairy Ann
- Violet Radcliffe - Clayton child
- Beulah Burns - Clayton child
- Thelma Burns - Clayton child
- Mae Giraci - Clayton child (*as Tina Rossi)
- Georgie Stone - Clayton child
- Allan Sears - Jed Martin (*A. D. Sears)
- F. A. Turner - Judge Lee Cavanagh
- Sam De Grasse - Dr. Richard Cavanagh
- Alberta Lee - Mrs. Cavanagh
- Elmo Lincoln - Bad Bald Clayton
