= John R. Cumpson =

American actor

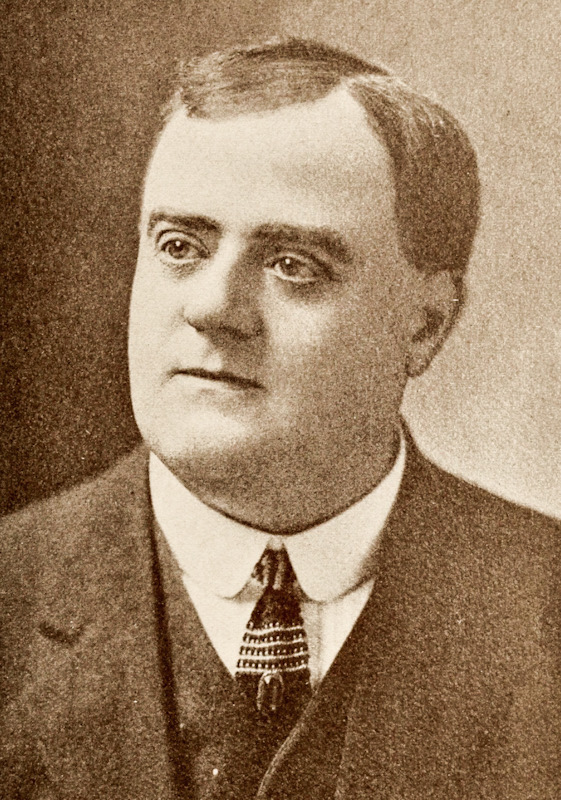
- The Motion Picture Story Magazine, 1911
- Born: John Raymond Cumpson; August 30, 1866; Buffalo, New York, U.S.
- Died: March 15, 1913 (aged 46); New York City, New York, U.S.
- Other names: John Compson; John R. Cumpson; Mr. Cumpson
- Occupations: Actor, comedian
- Years active: 1901–1913
- Spouses: Carrie Craft (m.1898–1900, her death)

John R. Cumpson (August 30, 1866 – March 15, 1913) was an American stage and film actor. In 1895 he performed on Broadway as Tam Duncan Faa in Sidney R. Ellis's Bonnie Scotland. He returned to Broadway in Up York State in 1901. With regard to his screen career, Cumpson appeared in at least 124 films between 1905 and 1912. A 1910 newspaper item described him as "the famous Swedish dialect comedian."

Silent film star Florence Lawrence enjoyed working often with Cumpson at the Biograph Company in 1908 and 1909, although later, in an interview with Photoplay, she described him as essentially a humorless comedian:

"Mr. Cumpson was the most serious comedian I have ever known. Nothing was ever funny to him, and he never tried to be funny....When all the rest of the company would laugh at something he had said or did, he would become indignant, thinking we were making fun of him."

Cumpson died of pneumonia and diabetes at Washington Heights Hospital in New York City.

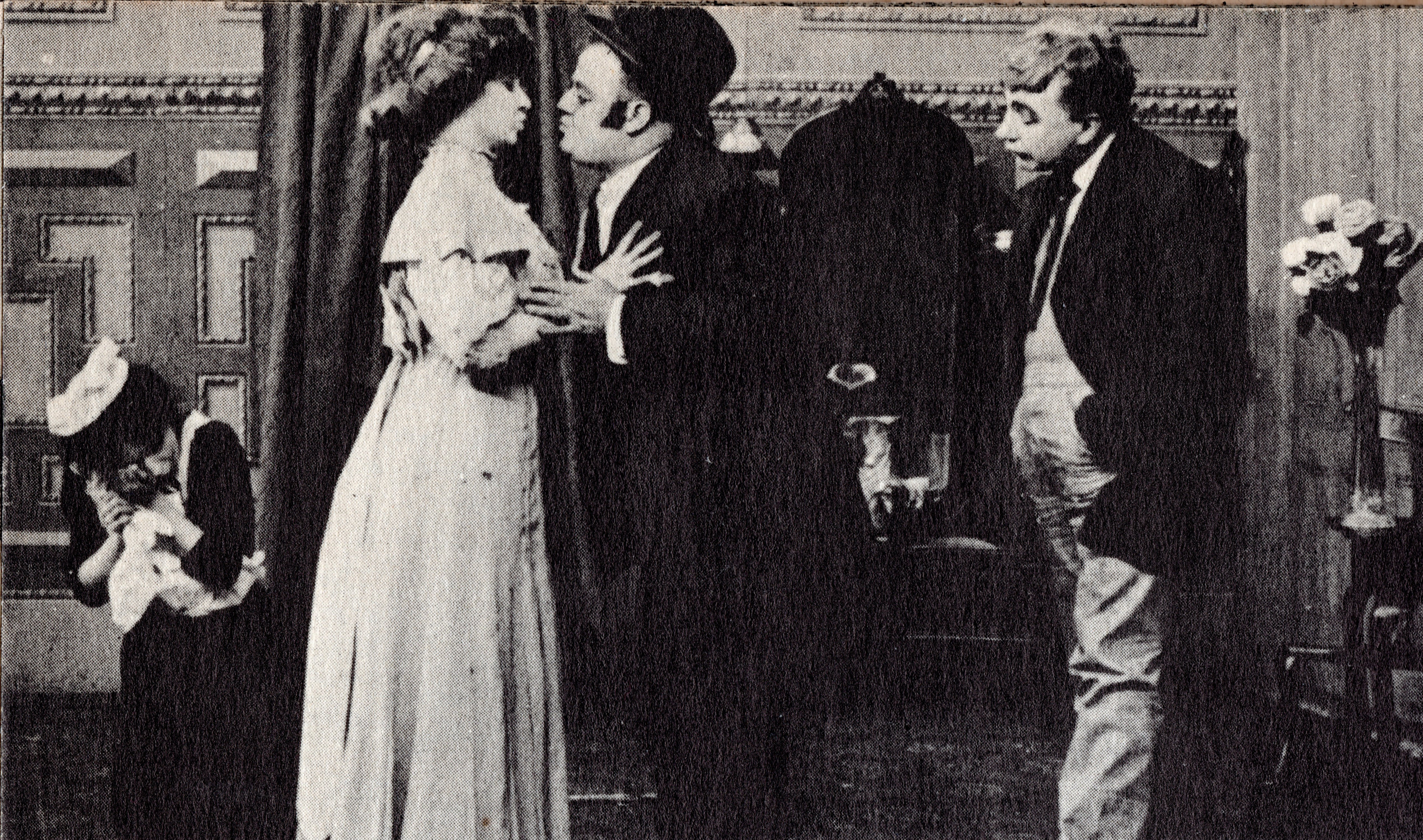
Film still of Cumpson (wearing hat) co-starring in the Biograph short Mrs. Jones Entertains (1909)

== Selected filmography ==
| Year | Film | Role | Notes |
|---|---|---|---|
| 1905 | The White Caps | | |
| 1908 | Romance of a Jewess | Customer | |
| 1908 | The Zulu's Heart | Zulu warrior | |
| 1908 | The Call of the Wild | Chinese servant | |
| 1908 | A Calamitous Elopement | | |
| 1908 | Monday Morning in a Coney Island Police Court | Justice McPheeney | |
| 1908 | A Smoked Husband | Mr. Benjamin Bibbs | |
| 1908 | Mr. Jones at the Ball | Mr. Eddie Jones | |
| 1909 | Mrs. Jones Entertains | Mr. Eddie Jones | |
| 1909 | Mr. Jones Has a Card Party | Mr. Eddie Jones | |
| 1909 | The Joneses Have Amateur Theatricals | Mr. Eddie Jones | |
| 1909 | Jones and His New Neighbors | Mr. Eddie Jones | |
| 1909 | His Wife's Mother | Mr. Eddie Jones | |
| 1909 | Jones and the Lady Book Agent | Mr. Eddie Jones | |
| 1909 | Her First Biscuits | Mr. Eddie Jones | |
| 1909 | The Peachbasket Hat | Mr. Eddie Jones | |
| 1909 | Jones' Burglar | Mr. Eddie Jones | |
| 1909 | Mrs. Jones' Lover or I Want My Hat | Mr. Eddie Jones | |
| 1909 | The Road to the Heart | Chinese cook | |
| 1909 | Trying to Get Arrested | Tramp | |
| 1909 | A Sound Sleeper | Tramp | |
| 1909 | Schneider's Anti-Noise Crusade | Mr. Schneider | |
| 1909 | Those Awful Hats | Theatre audience member | Alternative title: Those Darn Hats |
| 1909 | The Lonely Villa | | "At the Inn" |
| 1910 | How Bumptious Papered the Parlor | Bumptious | |
| 1910 | Two Men | Miner | |
| 1910 | Bumptious as a Fireman | Bumptious | |
| 1911 | Mr. Bumptious, Detective | Bumptious | |
| 1911 | Billy's Séance | Billy | |
| 1911 | The Child and the Tramp | 3rd tramp | |
| 1912 | Percy Learns to Waltz | Percy | |
| 1912 | A Millionaire for a Day | Fred Dudley | |
| 1912 | How Shorty Won Out | Shorty | |
| 1912 | A Case of Dynamite | Jonathan Jay | |
| 1912 | Ferdie, Be Brave | Ferdie | |
