= Warners, New York =

Warners
- hamlet
- Location of Warners in New York
- Coordinates: 43°05′07″N 76°19′45″W
- Country: United States
- State: New York
- County: Onondaga
- ZIP code: 13164
- Area codes: 315 and 680

Warners is a hamlet in Onondaga County, New York, United States. Warners is in the Town of Van Buren.
