= The Great Love (1918 film) =

1918 film directed by D. W. Griffith

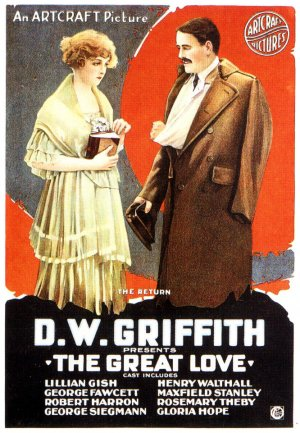
- Film poster
- Directed by: D. W. Griffith (as Captain Victor Marier)
- Written by: D. W. Griffith; Stanner E.V. Taylor as Captain Victor Marier
- Produced by: D. W. Griffith
- Starring: George Fawcett; Lillian Gish
- Cinematography: G. W. Bitzer; George Schneiderman
- Edited by: James Smith
- Music by: Louis F. Gottschalk
- Production company: Famous Players–Lasky / Artcraft
- Distributed by: Paramount Pictures
- Release date: August 11, 1918 (U.S.)
- Running time: 70 minutes
- Country: United States
- Language: Silent (English intertitles)

The Great Love is a 1918 American silent war drama film directed and written by D. W. Griffith who, along with scenario writer Stanner E.V. Taylor, is credited as "Captain Victor Marier". The film stars George Fawcett and Lillian Gish. Set during World War I, exterior scenes were shot on location in England. The Great Love is now considered to be a lost film.

This film had footage of several high society and influential British people helping out with the war effort, including Queen Alexandra, the widow of King Edward VII, and Sir Frederick Treves, the doctor who once knew and tended to Joseph Merrick a.k.a. "The Elephant Man". Footage of a Zeppelin air raid on London taken by G. W. Bitzer was also included the film.

== Plot ==
Jimmie Young, a young man from Youngstown, Pennsylvania, enlists in the British army after reading reports of German atrocities, joining the war effort before American forces formally enter the conflict. He begins military training at a camp near London. During a period of leave, he meets Susie Broadplains, a young Australian woman. Their relationship develops into a romantic attachment, and Susie's only leisure activity becomes walking with Jimmie in Pump Lane.

Following the death of a relative, Susie inherits £20,000, attracting the attention of Sir Roger Brighton, who pursues wealthy women. When Jimmie is suddenly deployed to the front, he is unable to say goodbye. Sir Roger uses the opportunity to propose, and Susie accepts.

Meanwhile, German agents plan to bomb a British arsenal, and Sir Roger is persuaded to assist by driving a car with its headlights aimed skyward to guide approaching Zeppelins. While on furlough recovering from an injury, Jimmie recognizes Sir Roger on the road, follows him, and ultimately confronts him in his cottage. Rather than be captured, Sir Roger takes his own life. Susie learns of Sir Roger's betrayal, and she and Jimmie are reunited.

== Cast ==
- George Fawcett as Reverend Josephus Broadplains
- Lillian Gish as Susie Broadplains
- Robert Harron as Jim Young
- Gloria Hope as Jessie Lovewell
- George Siegmann as Mr. Seymour
- Maxfield Stanley as John Broadplains
- Rosemary Theby as Miss Corintee
- Henry B. Walthall as Sir Roger Brighton

VIPs appearing as themselves

- Elizabeth Asquith
- Lily Elsie
- Violet Keppel
- Hazel, Lady Lavery as Mrs. John Lavery
- Lady Diana Manners
- Countess of Masserne
- Alice Heine as Princess of Monaco
- Honourable as Mrs. Montague
- Lady Paget (Note: Unclear if this is Walburga or her son Victor's actress wife Olive May, also called Lady Paget.)
- Queen Alexandra
- Henry Charles Stanley (Note: Incorrectly posted as Sir Henry Morton Stanley, the famous explorer who had died in 1904.)
- Bettina Stuart-Wortley
- Sir Frederick Treves
- Duchess of Beaufort
- Kathleen Pelham Burn, Countess of Drogheda (1887–1966)

== Reception ==
Like many American films of the time, The Great Love was subject to restrictions and cuts by city and state film censorship boards. For example, the Chicago Board of Censors required cuts, in Reel 4, three scenes of mother with illegitimate child with wife of Baron, Reel 5, after the intertitle "You are my wife and I stay here tonight" eliminate all following scenes of man pounding bed, and, Reel 6, the intertitle "Drunk with two wines — champagne and passion".

== See also ==
- List of lost films
