= His Wife's Child =

1913 film

- Directed by: Harry Solter
- Produced by: Victor Film Company
- Starring: Earle Foxe; Florence Lawrence; Matt Moore
- Distributed by: Universal Film Manufacturing Company
- Release date: November 10, 1908
- Country: US
- Languages: Silent film English intertitles

His Wife's Child is a 1913 American short silent film drama directed by Harry Solter and starring Earle Foxe, Florence Lawrence and Matt Moore in the lead roles.

== Cast ==
- Florence Lawrence
- Matt Moore
- Earle Foxe
- Charles Craig
- Jack Newton
- Leonora von Ottinger
- Percy Standing
- Jane Carter

== See also ==
- List of American films of 1908
