= The Spender (1913 film) =

1913 film by Harry Solter

The Spender is a 1913 American silent short romance film directed by Harry Solter and starring Earle Foxe, Florence Lawrence (also producer) and Matt Moore in the lead roles.

== Premise ==
A woman cures a wayward young man of his lavish spending.

== Cast ==
- Florence Lawrence
- Matt Moore
- Earle Foxe
- Charles Craig
- Jack Newton
- Leonora von Ottinger
