= An Affair of Honor (film) =

1901 American silent film

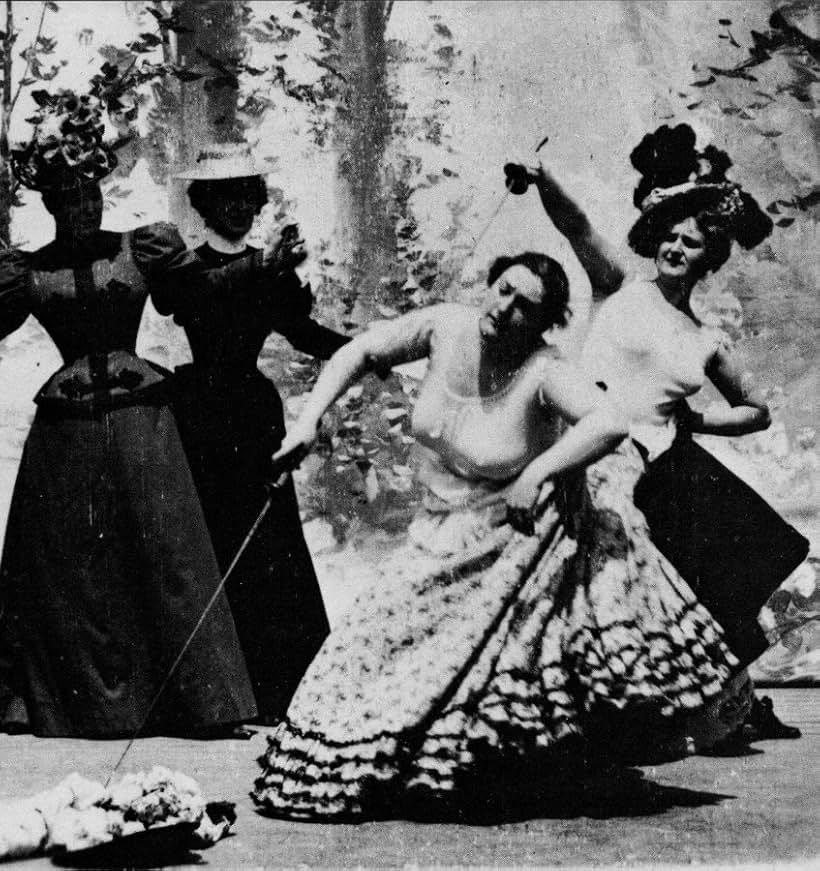
- Film still
- Written by: Lubin Studios
- Release date: May 18, 1901
- Country: United States
- Languages: Silent film English intertitles

Affair of Honor is an American silent film that was inspired by a famous painting. It was made 18 May 1901 in Philadelphia, Pennsylvania by Lubin Studios.

A woman and her male friend (Arthur Marvin) are seated at a table when another woman makes romantic overtures to the man. The two women then duel with swords, and one of the women is killed.
