= Arthur Marvin =

American cinematographer (1859-1911)

- Born: Arthur Weed Marvin; May 26, 1859; Warners, New York, United States
- Died: January 18, 1911 (aged 51); Los Angeles, California, United States
- Occupation: Cinematographer
- Years active: 1897–1911

Arthur Weed Marvin (May 26, 1859 – January 18, 1911), was an American cinematographer who worked for the American Mutoscope and Biograph Company in which his brother Harry Marvin was one of the four founders (the others being Herman Casler, William Kennedy Laurie Dickson, and Elias Koopman).

He shot 418 films between 1897 and 1911, including The Adventures of Dollie (1908), the directorial debut of D. W. Griffith, as well as other early Griffith shorts such as Pippa Passes in 1909.

He directed the short trick film Sherlock Holmes Baffled, which was the earliest known film to feature Arthur Conan Doyle's detective character Sherlock Holmes.

His nephew Daniel Warner Marvin II, Harry's son, perished in the sinking of the RMS Titanic in 1912.

He was born in Warners, New York, to Daniel Warner Marvin and Ellen Jane Weed. He was married to Sarah E. Babcock. He died in Los Angeles, California.

== Partial filmography ==
Year	Film
1900	Sherlock Holmes Baffled
1900	A Career of Crime
1901	An Affair of Honor
1908	The Adventures of Dollie
1908	Behind the Scenes
1908	The Kentuckian
1909	Pippa Passes
1909	The Lonely Villa
1909	A Sound Sleeper
1910	The Rocky Road
1910	May and December
1910	The Lucky Toothache
