= Harry Solter =

American actor (1873–1920)

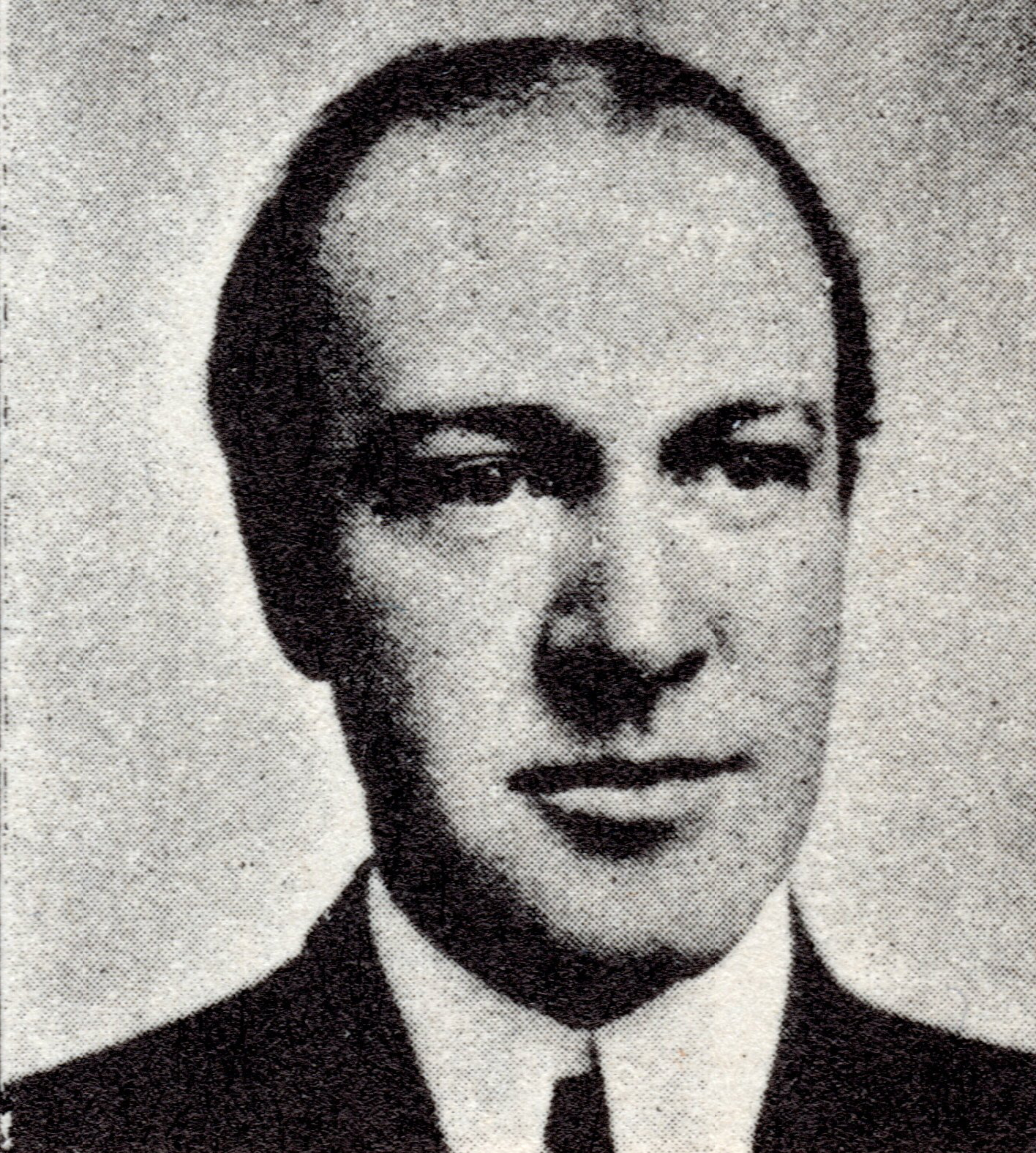
- Born: Henry Lewis Solter; November 19, 1873
- Died: March 2, 1920 (aged 46)
- Other names: Harry Salter; H. L. Solter; Harry L. Solter
- Occupations: Actor, director
- Years active: 1908–1917
- Spouse: Florence Lawrence (m. 1908)

Henry Lewis Solter (November 19, 1873 – March 2, 1920) was an American silent film actor and director.

== Career ==
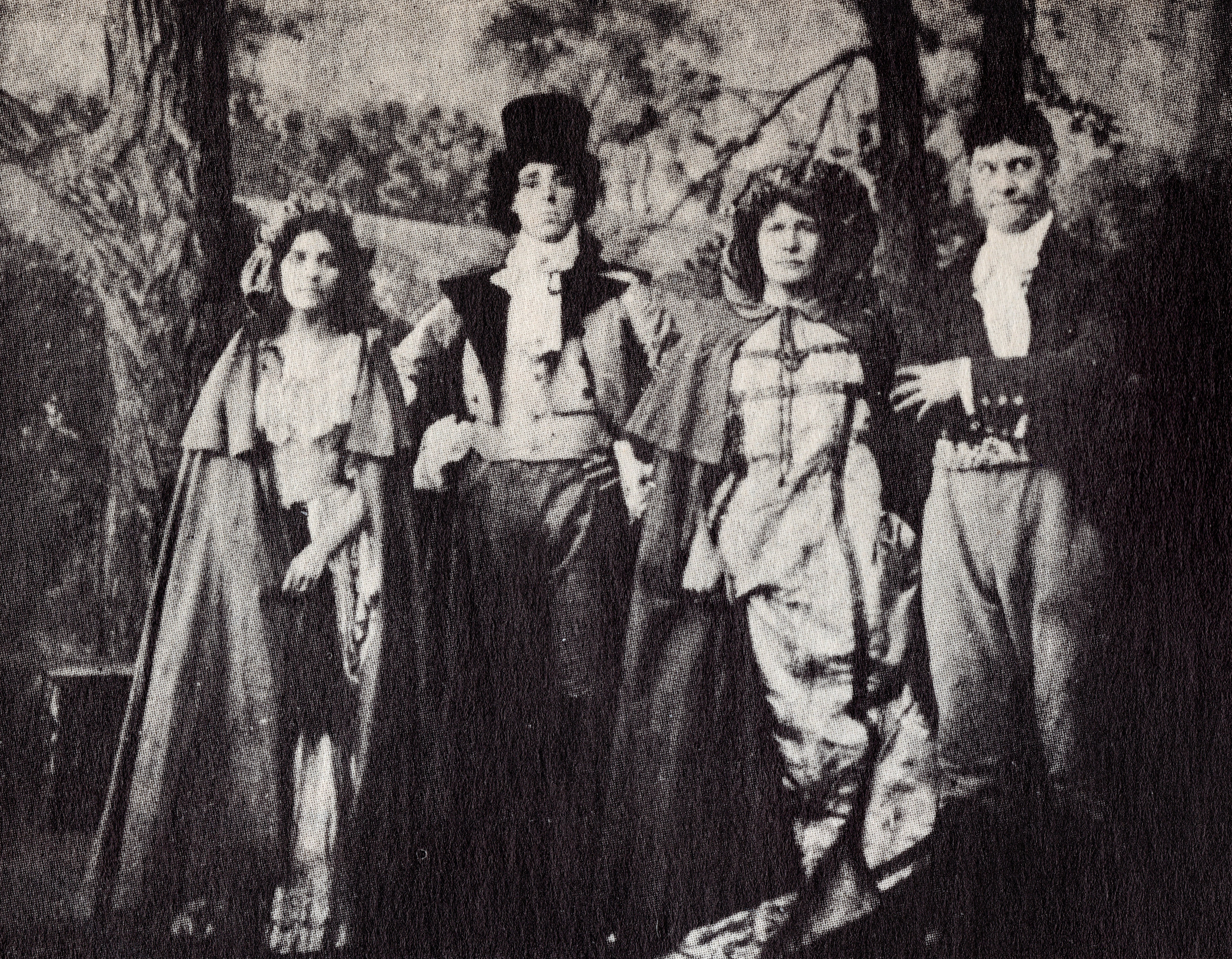
Cast of When Knights Were Bold (1908), from left: Linda Arvidson, D. W. Griffith, unknown player, and Solter

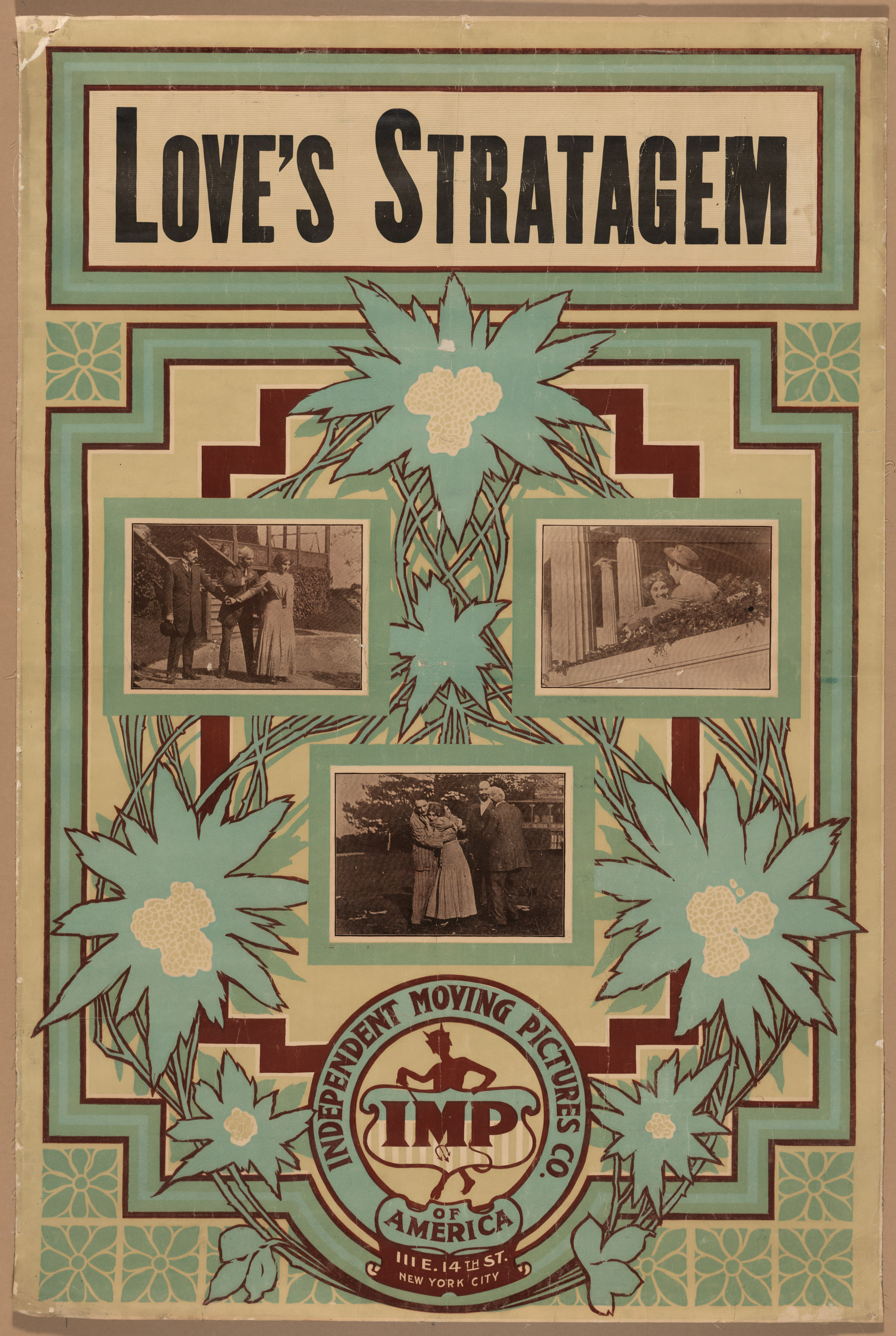
Poster for Love's Strategem (1909), directed by Solter

Solter began his career as an actor in 1908 with Biograph Studios. That same year he met actress Florence Lawrence while making the film Romeo and Juliet for Vitagraph Studios and married on August 30 of that year. In 1909, Solter began working for Carl Laemmle's Independent Moving Pictures Co. of America (IMP) as an actor but also as a director. Over the next nine years, he directed 148 silent films.

In 1912, Solter and his wife established the Victor Studios in Fort Lee, New Jersey. In 1913, they sold out to Laemmle whose amalgamation of several studios created the colossal Universal Film Manufacturing Co. Solter continued to direct for the new company until 1918 when health problems emerged. With this new prosperity, Florence was able to realize a "lifelong dream", buying a 50-acre (20 ha) estate in River Vale, New Jersey.

== Death ==
Solter died of a stroke on March 2, 1920, at the age of 46. He is interred in the Baltimore Cemetery in Baltimore, Maryland.

== Selected filmography ==
Year	Film	Role	Notes
1908	Romeo and Juliet		
1908	When Knights Were Bold	Nobleman	
1908	Balked at the Altar		
1908	Romance of a Jewess	Customer/Rubinstein	
1908	The Taming of the Shrew	Katharina's Father	Writer
1908	After Many Years	Tom Foster	
1908	Money Mad	First Villain	
1908	A Calamitous Elopement	Frank	
1908	The Kentuckian		
1909	At the Altar	On Street	
1909	Jones and the Lady Book Agent	Office employee	
1909	A Drunkard's Reformation	In the Play	
1909	The Renunciation	Sam Walters	
1910	The Rocky Road		
1910	All the World's a Stage	–	Director
1910	Two Men	–	Director
1911	The Two Paths		
1911	Duke De Ribbon Counter	–	Director
1911	During Cherry Time	–	Director
1912	Not Like Other Girls	–	Director
1912	Betty's Nightmare	–	Director
1912	The Redemption of Riverton	–	Director
1913	Unto the Third Generation	–	Director
1913	The Spender	–	Director
1913	His Wife's Child	–	Director
1914	The Romance of a Photograph	–	Director
1914	The Pawns of Destiny	–	Director, writer
1914	A Mysterious Mystery	–	Director
1916	Blind Man's Bluff	–	Director, scenario
1917	Face on the Screen	–	Director
1917	The Spotted Lily	–	Director; Credited as Harry L. Solter
1918	The Wife He Bought	–	Director
1921	The Sage Hen	–	Writer
