= The Planter's Wife =

The Planter's Wife may refer to:

- The Planter's Wife, an 1883 play by James K. Tillotson
- The Planter's Wife (1908 film), a 1908 silent American film based on the Tillotson play.
- The Planter's Wife (1952 film), a 1952 British film
