= The Golden Louis =

- Play film; runtime 00:06:13.
- Directed by: D. W. Griffith
- Written by: Edward Acker
- Produced by: Biograph Company; New York City
- Cinematography: Arthur Marvin
- Release date: February 22, 1909
- Running time: 6-7 minutes (474 feet, originally part of 1000-foot split reel)
- Country: United States
- Languages: Silent; English title card

The Golden Louis is a 1909 American drama film written by Edward Acker, directed by D. W. Griffith, and produced by the Biograph Company in New York City. Originally, this short was distributed to theaters on a "split reel", accompanying another Griffith-directed film, the comedy The Politician's Love Story.

== Plot ==
On a snowy holiday evening, an old woman sends a small girl begging for money along the streets of late 17th-century "old Paris". Well-dressed revelers and others passing by the child ignore her pleas for charity. Exhausted and cold, the little beggar lies down on some stone steps next to the sidewalk and falls asleep. Soon, one gentleman walking by takes pity on her, although he does not wake the girl. He simply places a coin, a gold "Louis d'or", into one of her wooden shoes, which has come off her foot and sits on the snow-covered pavement next to her. Elsewhere, inside a nearby gambling hall, one of the revelers has run out of cash playing "roulettes". Confident that he can win a fortune playing the game if he only had more money, he goes outside to find more funds. There he sees the girl asleep on the steps. He also spies the gold Louis in her shoe. Reluctant at first to take the coin, the young man "borrows" it, for he is certain he can win a fortune for himself and her at roulette. While he returns to the gambling hall and resumes playing, the child awakes and renews her wandering and begging along the streets. The gambler wins his expected fortune and now goes back to share his success with the girl. During his search for her, the weak, half-frozen little beggar returns to the steps and lies down once more. The gambler eventually finds her. She appears to be sleeping again, but he quickly realizes that the child is dead. Devastated, the gambler cries, rages at a crowd of onlookers, and then throws his roulette winnings into the snow. He then picks up the small lifeless body, cradles it in his arms, and continues sobbing.

== Cast ==
- Anita Hendrie as the mother or old woman
- Adele DeGarde as child
- Owen Moore as Good Samaritan, the donor of coin
- Charles Inslee as main gambler
- Herbert Yost as fellow gambler and reveler
- Mack Sennett as fellow gambler and reveler
- Arthur V. Johnson as fellow gambler
- Linda Arvidson as reveler
- George Gebhardt as reveler
- Marion Leonard as reveler
- Dorothy West as reveler
- Florence Lawrence as onlooker
- Wilfred Lucas as onlooker
- Kate Bruce as onlooker
- Gladys Egan as onlooker

== Production ==
D. W. Griffith is often credited with writing this short, but freelance screenwriter Edward Acker is identified in silent-era publications as the actual "scenarist". (Note: A few of the references that credit Griffith with writing this short include the AFI catalog, the Progressive Silent Film List, and the film's entry in the Internet Movie Database. Refer to "External links" to examine some of those references.) In a profile on Acker's screenwriting career, the New York-based trade journal The Moving Picture World reports in its September 30, 1916 issue:

EDWARD ACKER, the well-known photoplaywright, is hard at work on several big stories for feature companies. Mr. Acker, whose activities have been more or less bound up with the Biograph Company, has had a long and enviable career in the scenario world. As far back as 1908 D. W. Griffith, producer of "Intolerance," then with Biograph, accepted twenty-two stories from his pen—or rather typewriter. Some of these, produced by Mr. Griffith, were: "The Golden Louis," "What Drink Did," "The Telephone Girl and the Lady," "A Strange Meeting," "The Jilt," "The Suicide Club." "A Terrible Discovery," "The Old Confectioner's Mistake," "A Cry for Help," and "An Unseen Enemy."...As a free-lance writer Mr. Acker sold scores of stories to all the companies in the field. When his sales to Biograph had mounted to forty-three stories, he received an offer, which he accepted, of a staff position with Klaw & Erlanger, then combined with Biograph in the making of feature films....

While there is no evidence that Acker based his scenario on Hans Christian Andersen's tragic tale "The Little Match Girl", some film historians have noted that the plight and fate of the beggar child dying in the snow bear similarities to the plot in the Danish poet's famous short story, which was first published in 1845.

=== Filming ===
The short was filmed over two days–January 28–29, 1909–inside Biograph's New York studio at 11 East, 14th Street in Manhattan. Although some motion-picture sources cite nearby Bleecker Street as a secondary site for filming on location, no outdoor footage is included in surviving copies of the short. All scenes in the drama appear to be performed on interior corner sets, which would have been assembled at Biograph's 14th Street facilities.

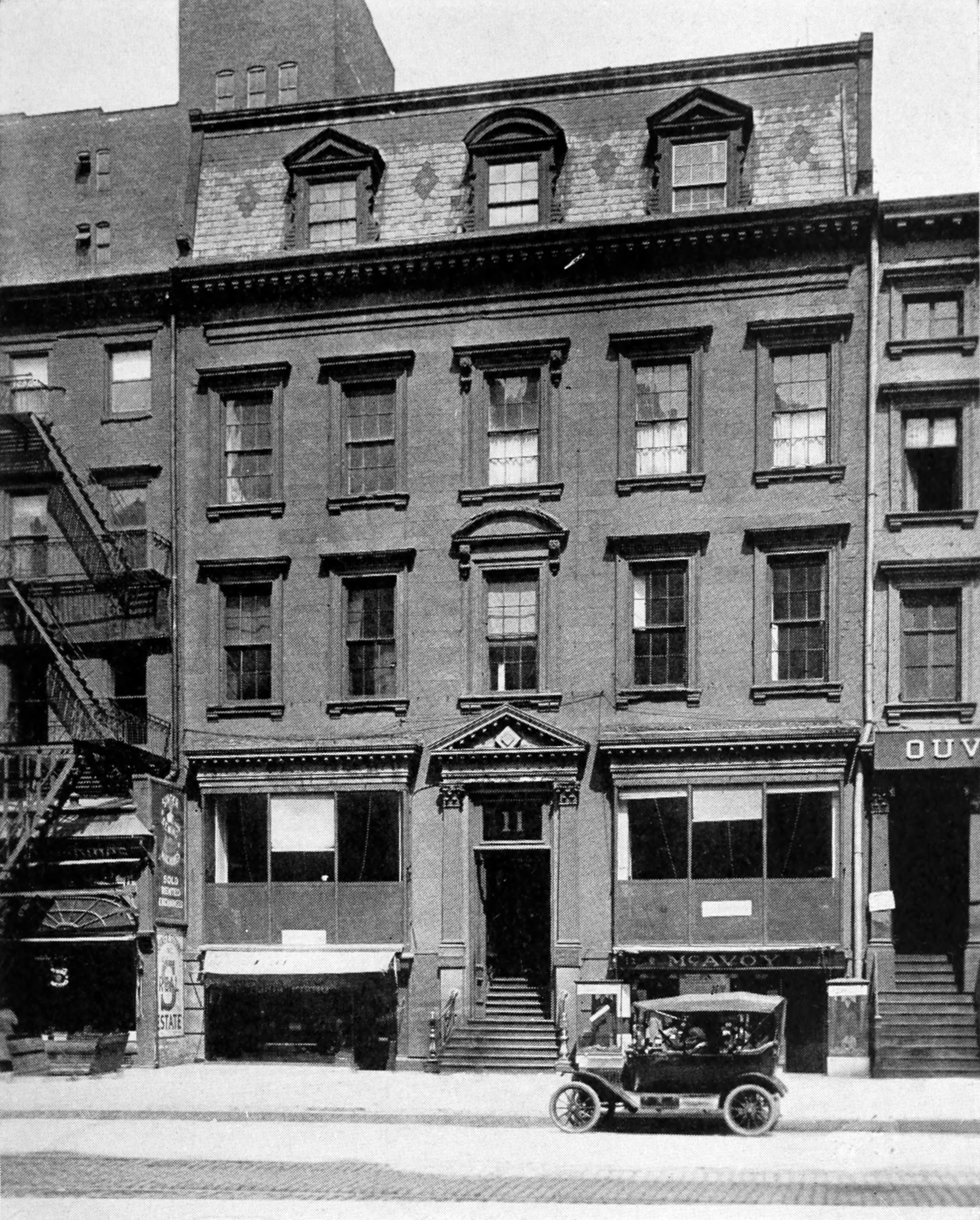
Biograph's Manhattan studio, where The Golden Louis was staged and filmed

=== Costuming and the roulette anachronism ===
During his long career as a director, D. W. Griffith gained a reputation among motion-picture crews, performers, and film reviewers for his efforts in making the costumes and sets in his productions as historically accurate as possible, whether in his sweeping epics such as The Birth of a Nation (1915) and Intolerance (1916) or in his far less elaborate screen projects. The Golden Louis, among his most modest "photoplays", provides insight into the challenges Griffith faced while working in the formative years of his career and within a young American film industry characterized largely by sparse production budgets, exceedingly tight filming schedules, and very limited choices for set designs and costumes.

With regard to this production's costumes, the actors' wigs, hats, waistcoats, capes, breeches, and other wardrobe elements visually cast the story in approximately 1650 France. Film historian Bernard Hanson in his article "D. W. Griffith: Some Sources", published in the December 1972 issue of The Art Bulletin, states that it appears there was no "systematic research" by Griffith in this early, small project to portray a specific, historically accurate time period with the costumes and sets. Instead, it was likely that the director's intention in The Golden Louis was simply to convey a general impression of Old Paris to theater audiences, one that could be interpreted as being set within a very broad timeframe, somewhere in the 17th or even 18th centuries.

Many moviegoers in 1908 may have cared little about the actual historical accuracy of the sets and costumes in the films they viewed; nevertheless, period costumes and furnishings can often, as in the case of The Golden Louis, create anachronisms in historical portrayals, items that can either be subtly or glaringly misplaced in time. The game of roulette featured in this short and mentioned in plot descriptions in 1908 film publications is one such anachronism. The table game as presented in the film was not developed in France until well into the 1700s, when it was adapted from an Italian numbers game called biribi. After a series of modifications and innovations, roulette achieved its present layout and wheel structure about 1790, roughly 140 years after the costume styles featured in The Golden Louis.

== Release and reception ==
Given the brevity of this drama, with a film length of just 474 feet and an original runtime of approximately seven minutes, it was released and distributed by Biograph on a single 1000-foot split reel, which was a standard reel sent to theaters that held two or more entirely separate motion pictures. The Golden Louis on its reel accompanied another slightly longer Griffith-directed film, the 526-foot comedy The Politician's Love Story. (Note: During the silent era, a "standard" reel could accommodate a little over 1000 feet of film. A full reel at that time also had a maximum running time between 15 and 16 minutes. While projection speeds differed at various cinemas in the silent period, especially in the early years, films were then, on average, projected at 16 frames per second. That speed was much slower than the 24 frames of later sound films. See How Movies Work by Bruce F. Kawin (New York: Macmillan Publishing Company, 1987, pp. 46-47).)

In the March 1909 issue of The Nickelodeon, the Chicago trade publication's reviewer H. A. Downey summarizes the film as fundamentally a morality lesson that portrays "the fallacy of good intentions".

== See also ==
- D. W. Griffith filmography
