= Herbert Yost =

American actor

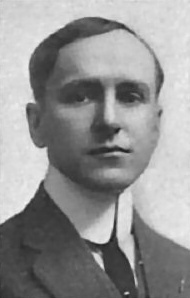
- Yost, c. 1911
- Born: Herbert Alms Yost; December 8, 1879; Harrison, Ohio; United States
- Died: October 23, 1945 (aged 65); New York City, New York; United States
- Occupations: Actor, playwright
- Years active: 1897–1945
- Spouse(s): Agnes Scott (m. 1916–1945; his death)
- Children: None

Herbert Yost (also credited as Barry O'Moore and Bertram Yost; December 8, 1879 – October 23, 1945) was an American actor who in a career that spanned nearly half a century performed predominantly on stage in stock companies and in numerous Broadway productions. Yost also acted in motion pictures, mostly in one-reel silent shorts released by the Biograph Company and Edison Studios between November 1908 and July 1915. By the time he began working in the film industry, Yost already had more than a decade of stage experience in hundreds of dramatic and comedic roles and was widely regarded in the theatre community "as one of the country's finest stock actors". Reportedly, to reduce the risk of tarnishing his reputation as a professional actor by being identified as a screen performer, Yost often billed himself as "Barry O'Moore" while working in films. He was ultimately cast in scores of motion pictures in the early silent era, although with the exceptions of appearing in three more films in the sound era, Yost spent the remaining decades of his career acting in major theatre productions, almost exclusively on Broadway. (Note: A full, accurate accounting of any actor's filmography from the early 1900s is made more difficult by the large number of American films that are lost from that era. Identifications of specific cast members in any single production can also be hard to verify and often impossible to cite with certainty, for many surviving production records provide few details. Also, Biograph and some other early studios, as a matter of company policy for years, did not publicly credit its performers or identify them in film-related news or in advertisements in either trade publications or newspapers.)

== Early life and early stage career ==
Born in Harrison, Ohio, in December 1879, Herbert was the youngest of three sons of Angeline Leona (née Bennett) and Peter H. Yost. The following year, the decennial federal census documents the Yost family living in northern Kentucky, in Covington, where Herbert's father owned and operated a prosperous retail grocery and a dry goods store. After working in the family business in his youth, Herbert at age 17 chose to leave home and pursue a career in show business like his older siblings Walter and Harry. Harry, in fact, guided or "sponsored" his little brother's entry into performing on stage by getting Herbert a job in 1897 with the Murray-Hart Comedy Company, which specialized in "one-night stands". In its travels to various cities and towns, that troupe presented single performances of satirical plays such as When London Sleeps and A Life for a Life.

After one full season working for Murray-Hart, Yost joined the Frost Stock Company and did a multitude of jobs in its traveling shows for a salary of six dollars a week ($200 today). He portrayed several characters in the company's staging of The Three Musketeers and The Two Orphans, and was responsible as well for entertaining audiences by playing the piano before each show, during intermissions, and giving concerts following every performance. By 1901, Yost had left Frost to work for seven years with a series of other stock companies in Philadelphia, Boston, Cleveland, Toledo, and elsewhere. During that time he was also cast in several Broadway productions. He portrayed, for example, Lieutenant Pierre d'Norville in the 1900 musical farce The Military Maid and the character Jimmy Burnett in the Broadway drama The Measure of a Man at Weber's Music Hall in 1906.

== Films ==
By 1908, with more than a decade of experience traveling and performing with various companies, Yost had established himself a "considerable reputation" as a stage actor. Near the end of that year he began working as well in the rapidly expanding motion-picture industry. At that time, in the opinion of many theatre actors and producers, performing on screen in the new medium of film was an inferior, far less prestigious occupation than acting on stage in the "legitimate" theatre. Yost therefore adopted the name Barry O'Moore during his early years as a film actor to distinguish his screen work from his stage career, allegedly in an effort to conceal his identity and, at least to some degree, to distance himself professionally "from the shame of the cinema". Nevertheless, Yost during the motion-picture portion of his career was not credited as Barry O'Moore in all of his films or referred to consistently as O'Moore in studio production records or in release advertisements in either the silent or sound eras. Yet, outside the film industry, in the realm of theatre, he was invariably credited for decades as Herbert Yost in his many Broadway roles and in other stage productions.

=== Biograph Company, 1908–1909 ===
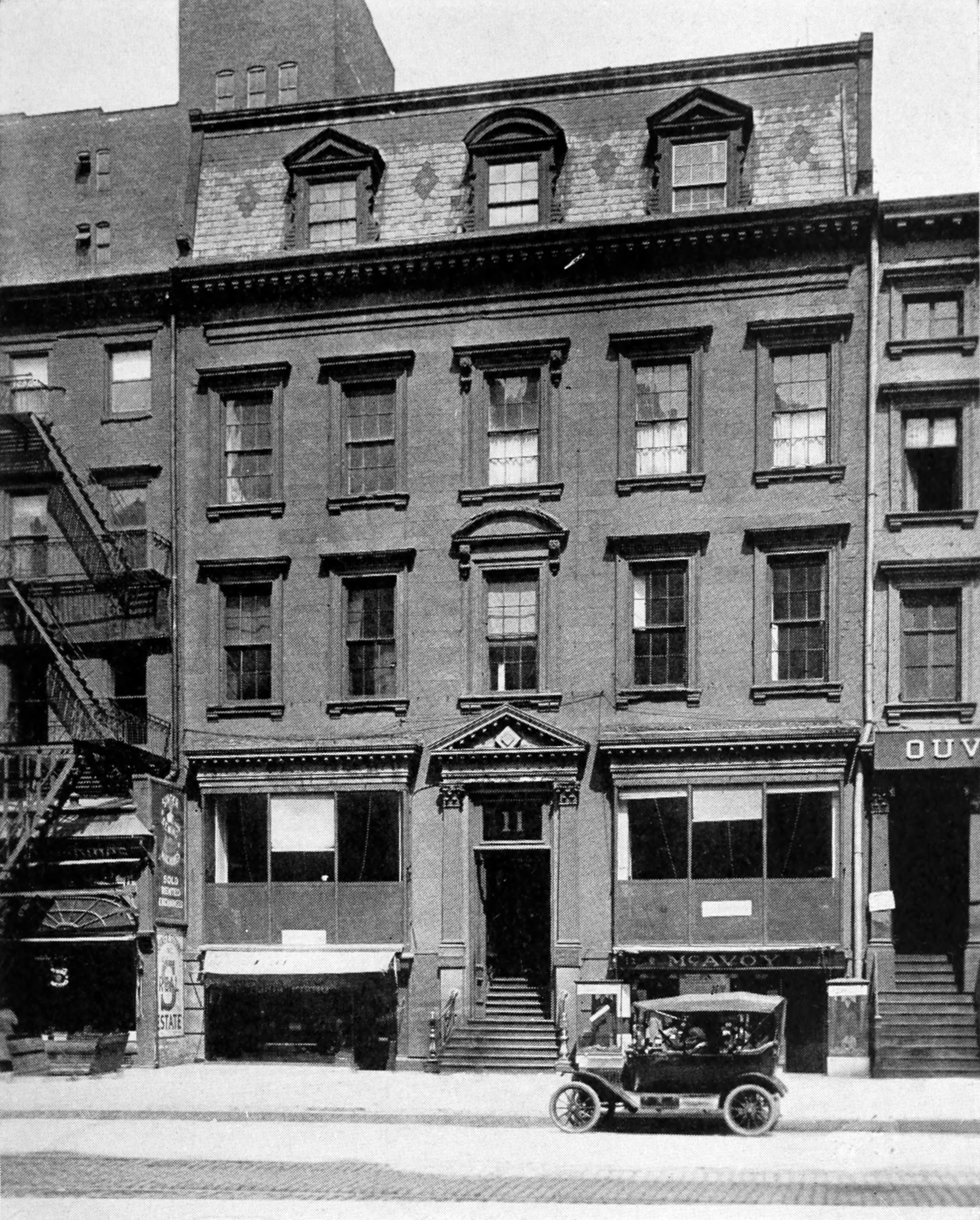
Biograph's 14th Street studio in Manhattan, where Yost performed in his first films

In October 1908, Yost joined the growing number of "photoplayers" at the Biograph Company, which then had its headquarters and main studio inside a sprawling, renovated brownstone mansion at 11 East 14th Street in Manhattan. It was there where Yost started working for D. W. Griffith, who was just beginning his legendary career as a film director. Under contract to produce at least two motion pictures and sometimes as many as three pictures each week for the company, Griffith was given a "virtual carte blanche" by Biograph to make all decisions regarding story, casting and shooting. It was therefore Griffith who officially hired Yost.

The use of a screen name to hide or obscure one's identity proved to be an irrelevant issue for Yost at Biograph. (Note: When Yost was working at Biograph, the corporation's full title was the American Mutoscope and Biograph Company.) The company, as a matter of official policy, did not publicly identify its performers and production crews, not even Griffith himself, with on-screen credits or in film advertisements in trade publications or newspapers. Such public recognition of cast and crew would not begin at Biograph until 1913, nearly four years after Yost left the company. (Note: The studio's non-credit policy for its film personnel, especially for actors, was enforced for many years in an effort by Biograph to keep production costs down or at least steady. Such use of "anonymous players" was rooted in the company's belief that the more celebrity actors attained, the more money they wanted for their performances.) Linda Arvidson, who was one of Yost's fellow actors at Biograph, was also at the time the wife of D. W. Griffith. In When the Movies Were Young–Arvidson's 1925 memoir about the early years of the American film industry–she takes exception to accounts that Yost adopted a screen name to avoid the "shame" of working in films:

Mr. Yost was one actor who used a different name for his picture work. He called himself "Barry O'Moore" in the movies. Not that he felt the movies beneath him, but he was nervous about the future reaction. He showed good foresight. For as soon as the big theatrical producers got wind of the fact that their actors were working in moving picture studios, they decided to put a crimp in the idea. The Charles Frohman office issued an edict that any actor who worked in moving pictures could not work for them. But the edict was shortly revoked.

Since Biograph did not publicly credit its actors on screen or acknowledge them in print prior to 1913, confirming the casting and presence of any one of the company's actors in a production prior to that year requires direct references to a performer in primary-source material such as original Biograph production records, contemporary personal notes, period correspondence, or footage from a surviving film in which the actor is clearly identifiable. Some modern filmographies relating to Yost or to his screen name Barry O'Moore include his casting in some 1908 and 1909 Biograph releases but do so without any source citations. (Note: In its online filmography for Barry O'Moore, the Internet Movie Database (IMDb) includes the 1908 Biograph release Ingrate in that listing. Yost's casting in that production is not found in any of the numerous primary sources cited in the noted 1985 reference D. W. Griffith and the Biograph Company or in the cited Library of Congress film records.) One modern reference–the 1985 volume D. W. Griffith and the Biograph Company by Cooper C. Graham and others–relies heavily for its content on the D. W. Griffith Papers preserved at the Museum of Modern Art. Those papers include details on Biograph's development of Griffith's scenarios as well as casting and filming schedules. The company's "Cameraman's Register" for 1899–1911, its Biograph Bulletins from 1908 through 1912, entries in contemporary studio directories, and print copies of Biograph's 1908 and 1909 releases preserved in the Library of Congress provide documentation that Yost performed in no less than 20 productions for Biograph during his employment there.

Even though Yost was a highly experienced theatre actor by 1908, the performance techniques required for silent films were very different from those used on stage, with the most obvious difference being the total absence of spoken dialogue. Intertitles provided audiences with some context for storylines, but Yost, like other screen actors of that period, had to convey his characters' intent and emotions solely through facial expressions, hand gestures, and by other subtle and exaggerated body movements. In his first few films for Biograph, Yost served as minor supporting characters, likely casting assignments made by Griffith to acclimate the veteran stage actor to film sets and performance methods before placing him in starring roles.

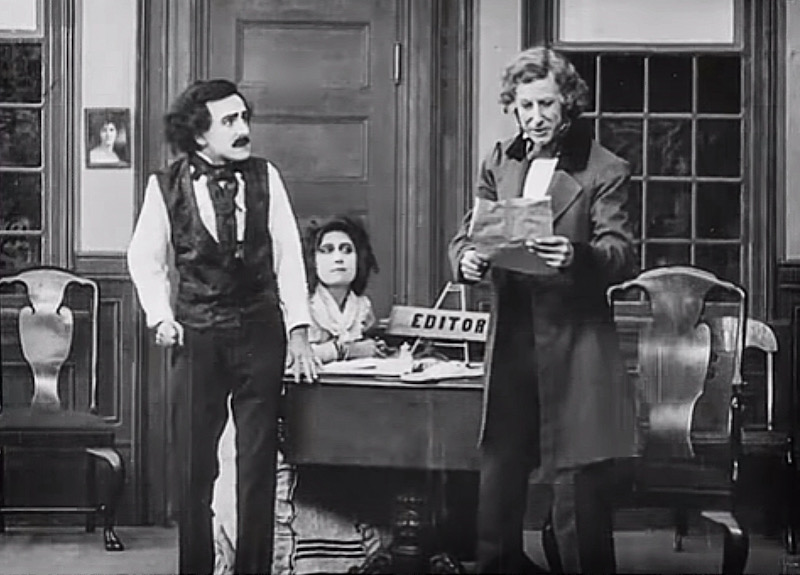
Yost (left) as Edgar Allan Poe in 1909 Biograph short

Yost's first confirmed screen appearance for Biograph is in the 14-minute Civil War drama The Guerrilla in which he is among a group of Confederate and Union soldiers. His second verified role is in the 10-minute drama The Criminal Hypnotist, which was filmed at Biograph's Manhattan studio on December 8 and 21, 1908 and released the following month, on January 18. Griffith cast Yost in that short to serve simply as one guest among a small crowd of partygoers.

After Yost performed in two other supporting roles, in The Fascinating Mrs. Francis and The Brahma Diamond, Griffith assigned him to star in the 1909 short Edgar Allen Poe [sic]. (Note: When Biograph's film about Edgar Allan Poe was released in February 1909 and throughout its theatrical run, the short was consistently identified and advertised with Poe's middle name misspelled in the production's official title in which an "e" instead of the correct second "a" is used: Edgar Allen Poe.) Released by Biograph on February 8, the historical drama, which has a running time less than seven minutes, is loosely based on actual events in the life of the 19th-century American writer and poet. More specifically, the film's action focuses on the death of Poe's wife Virginia Clemm, who is portrayed on screen by Linda Arvidson. Copies of this film survive, and they show that Yost in his 19th-century costume, wig, mustache, and makeup presents a very credible representation of Poe. A few other examples of 1909 releases in which Yost performed at Biograph are the comedy The Suicide Club; the dramedy The Road to the Heart; The Deception, a drama with the "Biograph Girl" Florence Lawrence; and Yost's final film for company, The Cardinal's Conspiracy, released in July 1909. Shortly after completing the latter film, the now-experienced screen actor signed a contract to work for Edison Studios, also located at that time in New York City, in the Bronx.

=== Edison Studios, 1909, 1912–1915 ===
Once he joined Edison in August 1909, Yost performed in only two shorts for the remainder of that year: in the comedy Ethel's Luncheon, released on September 3, and the drama The Little Sister, released on September 14. In both films Yost is credited as Bertram Yost rather than by his previously noted screen name Barry O'Moore. After the release of those shorts, he took time away from films to return to stage acting. Upon his return to Edison in 1912, he began performing again in studio productions and was then credited consistently as Barry O'Moore. From 1912 through 1914, Yost was cast in nearly 90 one-reelers for Edison and in a wide assortment of roles, including as the character Nelson Wales in a series of dramatic shorts.

PLAY complete Edison film in which Barry O'Moore (Yost) portrays "Octavius" (1914); runtime 00:13:47.

Yost's greatest film success credited as O'Moore and his most notable casting while working at Edison occurred in 1914, when he starred in a dozen comedy shorts portraying the "amateur detective" Octavius. Characterized as a wealthy young man and a "gentle and genial idiot", Octavius was presented as having "sublime confidence in his own marvellous [sic] ability as a sleuth" to solve crimes and mysteries. Edison's bumbling screen character is described further in a 1914 issue of Illustrated Films Monthly as being someone who "could not trail a limberger cheese through a bed of violets." O'Moore's first short as Octavius in the studio's popular "Adventure" series is The Adventure of the Actress' Jewels, released in January 1914; his last, The Adventure of the Wrong Santa Claus, in December 1914.

Following his work as Octavius, O'Moore in early 1915 co-starred in his final two motion pictures for Edison: the drama shorts The Master Mummer and For His Mother. He then moved to World Film Corporation to co-star in just one production, a five-reel film adaptation of the popular stage comedy Over Night in which Yost had co-starred on Broadway in 1911. The 1915 film version was the veteran actor's last screen performance of the silent era and one in which he was credited as Herbert Yost, no longer as Barry O'Moore. After the release of Over Night, Yost did not return to films for another 14 years. Until 1929 he devoted himself solely to acting on stage. Still, he received excellent reviews in his final silent production. Variety in its December 31, 1915 assessment of Over Night focuses special attention on cast members "Herbert Yost and Sam B. Hardy", the "two comedians" who in the trade paper's opinion "take the picture along." In distinguishing the two actors' performances, Variety observes, "Mr. Yost is the better fun maker for the screen. He knows how to inject a laugh. Hardy often aims for one but must be assisted."

=== Brief return to films, 1929–1930, 1934 ===
Yost spent the vast majority of the final 30 years of his career acting on stage, but he did return very briefly to films during the early sound era. Recordings of his voice are therefore preserved in at least three screen productions in which he was cast and also credited as Herbert Yost. Those releases are "his talking picture debut", which is the two-reel short Love, Honor and Oh! Baby (1929); the feature comedy Fast and Loose (1930); and the romance drama The Age of Innocence (1934).

== Continuing stage career ==
During his early years acting in motion pictures, Yost periodically suspended his screen work to perform again on stage, sometimes for extended periods. He took such time away in 1910 and 1911, which explains the lack of entries for those years in his available filmographies. After the release of his first two shorts for Edison in 1909, Yost soon embarked on a tour to perform with his future wife Agnes Scott in The Wall Between, a "sentimental playet" that they presented at the Grand Opera House in Indianapolis, the Majestic in Chicago, the Orpheum in Harrisburg, Pennsylvania, and at other major theatres.

In late 1910, Yost accepted an important role in the three-act Broadway farce Over Night, which opened at the Hackett Theatre in Manhattan on January 2, 1911. (Note: New York theatre reviews in 1911 and later references to the play cite its title in two different forms: Over Night and Overnight.) The play was a critical and popular success and brought the actor very positive notices from New York City's top reviewers. In an assessment of the production's premiere, The New York Times focused special attention on the performances of two cast members, noting that the players "who seemed to win from the audience the most favor were Margaret Lawrence and Herbert A. Yost." In another Manhattan review, the New York Tribune found Over Night "commonplace" but, like The Times, complimented Yost's portrayal of the "bashful bridegroom" Richard Kettle as one of the bright, "amusing" parts in the production. By the standards of the day, the play was a long-running hit with 160 performances at the Hackett Theatre before moving in April to the Playhouse Theatre for additional presentations.

=== More Broadway roles, 1914–1930s ===
The success of Over Night occupied most of Yost's professional time in 1911, (Note: Yost would reprise his 1911 Over Night stage role in the play's 1915 screen adaptation produced by the World Film Manufacturing Company. That 1915 release was Yost's last silent film.) but he did return to screen acting to work in a variety of releases for Edison Studios from 1912 to mid-1915. In 1914 he took time away again from films to accept a role in the Broadway play The Marriage of Columbine, another stage production that garnered him rave reviews for his role as Alfred Scott. The New York Times included "HERBERT YOST EXCELS" in bold print in the heading of its review of Harold Chapin's four-act comedy. The newspaper also reported, "The most distinguished performance of the evening is given by Herbert Yost", adding that "He plays throughout with a complete understanding that is reflected in every slightest tone and gesture." In summarizing the actor's abilities, The New York Times stated, "Mr. Yost is a most gifted and intelligent comedian."

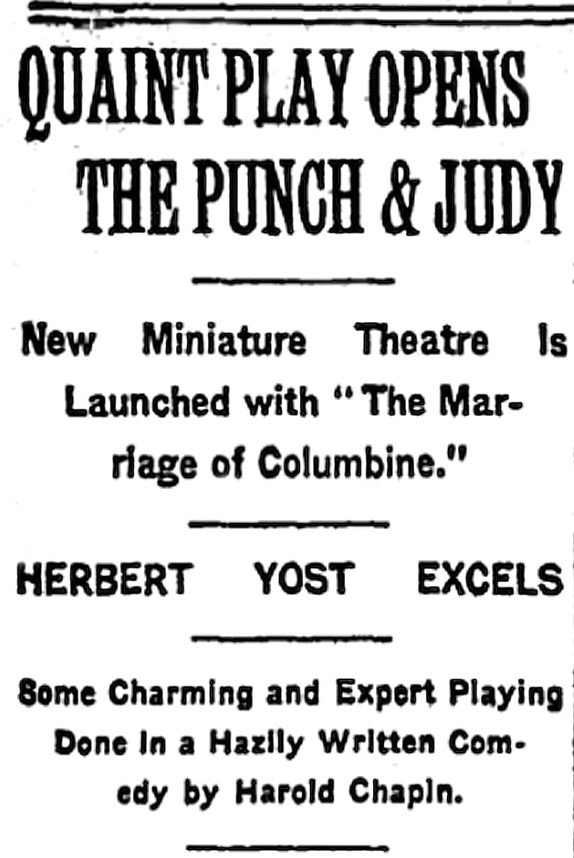
Review headline praising Yost's performance at the Punch & Judy Theatre in New York City, 1914

In 1915, almost immediately after his acclaimed work in The Marriage of Columbine, Yost performed yet again on Broadway in The Clever Ones. He continued to be cast in play after play, further enhancing his reputation as a seasoned, reliable stage performer whether working in comedies, farces, or in a range of drama types. Some of the Broadway productions in which he was cast in the late 1910s and 1920s include In for the Night (1917), The Morris Dance (1917), Polly With a Past (1917), The Young Visitors (1920), A Bachelor's Night (1921), Why Men Leave Home (1922), The New Poor (1924), The Comedienne (1924), The Enchanted April (1924), The Goat Song (1926), A Proud Woman (1926), One Glorious Hour (1927), What the Doctor Ordered (1927), and Congratulations (1929).

Yost began the decade of the 1930s co-starring with Spring Byington in the Broadway comedy I Want My Wife (1930) at the Liberty Theatre. He then performed in Rock Me, Julie (1931). More Broadway roles for Yost followed as did more accolades from reviewers. Some of the additional productions in which he was cast were John Brown (1934), The Red Cat (1934), Post Road (1934), Battleship Gertie (1935), End of Summer (1936) The Masque of Kings (1937). In 1938 Variety recognized him as one of the "standouts" in the Broadway comedy Wine of Choice in his portrayal of the "disappointed uncle" Charles Dow Hanlon. Yost was next cast as David Crampton in another Broadway comedy, Morning's at Seven, which was presented at the Longacre Theatre from November 1939 to January 1940.

=== Final stage performances, 1940s ===
With decades of stage experience and being well known among theatre companies as an accomplished character actor, Yost continued his Broadway career into the 1940s. Additional roles for him followed in the Broadway productions of My Fair Ladies (1941), Ring Around Elizabeth (1941), and The Cat Screams (1942). Two years later he made his final stage appearances as the "Tragic Gentleman" in the three-act comedy Jacobowsky and the Colonel co-starring Louis Calhern, Oskar Karlweis, and Annabella. That play, directed by Elia Kazan, premiered at the Martin Beck Theatre in Manhattan on March 14, 1944, and Yost performed not only there during the production's one-year run in New York but also during the play's subsequent tour, which continued across the country until July 1945, ending just three months before the actor's death.

== Personal life and death ==
Yost married only once. In February 1916, he wed Agnes Scott, who was a native of Tennessee and also a professional stage actor. The couple remained together until Herbert's death nearly three decades later. Federal census records and other official records indicate that they had no children and for many years resided in Old Greenwich, Connecticut, located about 40 miles northeast of lower Manhattan.

When away from his stage roles and film-making, Yost spent much of his personal time presenting lectures about theatrical history as well as writing several plays, including No Roof Big Enough, which was produced and presented in Southern theatres. He also served for many years as a lay preacher for Practical Christianity. In that capacity he convened meetings at the Unity Center in New York City and later established near his home in Old Greenwich an affiliated chapel, where he often conducted services and hosted related events.

According to his obituaries, in Manhattan on the evening of October 22, 1945, Yost failed to meet his wife Agnes as planned at the 46th Street Theatre following her performance there in the play Dark of the Moon. Concerned about Herbert, she quickly returned to their room at the nearby Bristol Hotel, where she found him unconscious on the floor. It was reported that Yost died in the room a short time later, after midnight, on October 23. Additional reports at the time cited "a heart ailment" as Yost's cause of death.

== Selected filmography ==
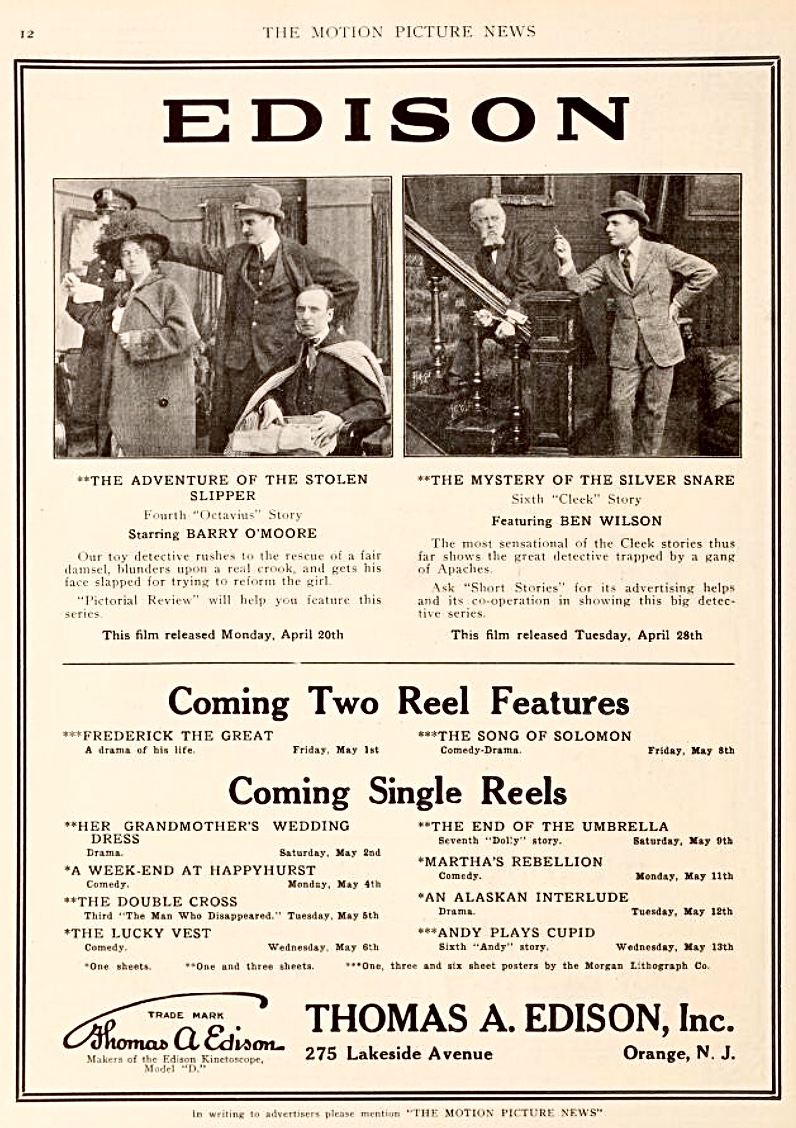
Advertisement for releases by Edison Studios with Yost credited as Barry O'Moore (left image, seated), April 1914

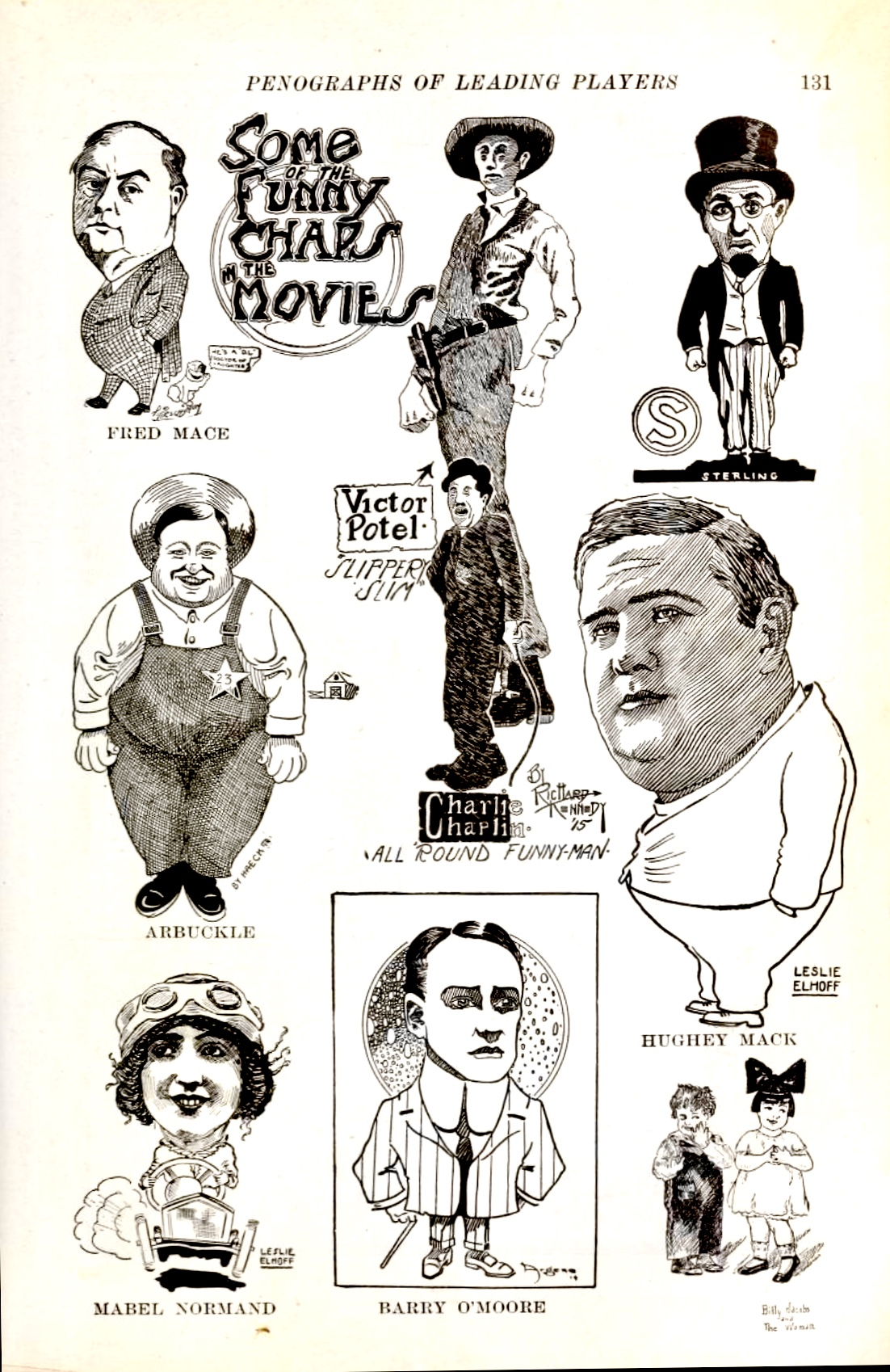
Caricature of Barry O'Moore (bottom, center) featured among other "leading" film comedians of 1915

- The Guerrilla (1908) as Civil War soldier
- The Criminal Hypnotist (1909) as party guest
- The Fascinating Mrs. Francis (1909) as young man
- The Brahma Diamond (1909) as a tourist
- Edgar Allen Poe [sic] (1909) as Edgar Allan Poe
- Politician's Love Story (1909)
- The Golden Louis (1909)
- The Medicine Bottle (1909)
- The Deception as Harry Colton (1909)
- The Road to the Heart (1909) as José
- The Eavesdropper (1909) as Carlos
- At the Altar (1909)
- Lucky Jim as Jim (1909)
- The Light That Came (1909)
- The Roue's Heart (1909)
- Faded Lilies (1909)
- A Troublesome Satchel (1909)
- 'Tis An Ill Wind That Blows No Good (1909)
- Suicide Club (1909)
- The Cardinal's Conspiracy (1909) as the king
- What Happened to Mary (1912)
- The Little Woolen Shoe (1912)
- The Adventure of the Actress' Jewels (1914) as Octavius
- The Adventure of the Extra Baby (1914) as Octavius
- The Adventure of the Alarm Clock (1914) as Octavius
- The Adventure of the Stolen Slipper (1914) as Octavius (Note: As of April 2021, the Internet Movie Database (IMDb) incorrectly lists this film's title as "The Adventure of the Stolen Papers")
- The Adventure of the Counterfeit Money (1914) as Octavius
- The Adventure of the Missing Legacy (1914) as Octavius
- The Adventure of the Absent-Minded Professor (1914) as Octavius
- The Adventure of the Pickpocket (1914) as Octavius
- The Adventure of the Hasty Elopement (1914) as Octavius
- The Adventure of the Smuggled Diamonds (1914) as Octavius
- The Adventure of the Lost Wife (1914) as Octavius
- The Adventure of the Wrong Santa Claus (1914)
- The Man Who Disappeared (1914)
- Over Night (1915) as Richard Kettle (1915)
- Love, Honor and Oh! Baby (1929) as Mr. Welland
- Fast and Loose (1930) as George Crafton
- The Age of Innocence (1934) as Howard Welland
