= Those Boys! =

1909 film directed by D. W. Griffith

- Directed by: D. W. Griffith
- Written by: D. W. Griffith
- Starring: Anita Hendrie
- Cinematography: G. W. Bitzer; Arthur Marvin
- Release date: January 18, 1909
- Running time: 4 minutes (one reel)
- Country: United States
- Language: Silent

Those Boys! is a 1909 American silent short comedy film directed by D. W. Griffith.

== Cast ==
- Anita Hendrie as The Mother
- Linda Arvidson as A Daughter
- Clara T. Bracy
- Florence Lawrence as The Maid
- Dorothy West as A Daughter
