= The Road to the Heart =

1909 film directed by D. W. Griffith

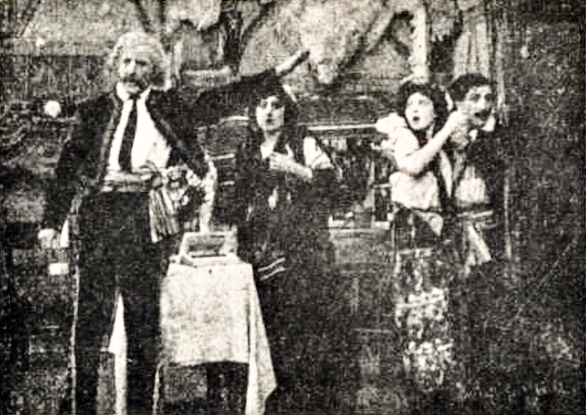
- Scene with actors (from left) David Miles, Anita Hendrie, Florence Lawrence, and Herbert Yost
- Directed by: D. W. Griffith
- Written by: D. W. Griffith
- Produced by: American Mutoscope and Biograph Company; New York, N.Y.
- Starring: David Miles; Herbert Yost; Anita Hendrie
- Cinematography: Arthur Marvin
- Release date: April 5, 1909
- Running time: 9-10 minutes (release length 618 feet) (Note: During the silent era, a "standard" 1000-foot reel could accommodate footage with a maximum running time of between 15 and 16 minutes. While projection speeds differed at various cinemas in the silent period, especially in the early years, films then, on average, were projected at 16 frames per second. That speed was much slower than the 24 frames of later sound films. See How Movies Work by Bruce F. Kawin (New York: Macmillan Publishing Company, 1987, pp. 46-47).)
- Country: United States
- Languages: Silent; English intertitles

The Road to the Heart is a 1909 American short film, a dramedy directed by D. W. Griffith and produced by the Biograph Company of New York City. Starring David Miles, Anita Hendrie and Herbert Yost, it was filmed over two days in March 1909 at Biograph's studio in Manhattan and released that April in theaters as a film reel split with the Biograph comedy Trying to Get Arrested.

== Plot ==
Various 1909 film-industry publications provide basic summaries of this photoplay's plot. The trade journal The Moving Picture World is one that describes the storyline in its April 3 issue:

THE ROAD TO THE HEART...Miguel, an old wealthy ranchero, disapproves of his daughter's marriage to Jose, a poor Mexican, and drives them from his house. Vinuella, Miguel's wife, resents his action by leaving with them. This sends Miguel into a fury, but still obdurate, lie allows them to go, saying that he can get along without them. Now comes the crucial condition. He must have a housekeeper and so sends his servant to engage one. The first is a Chinaman, and to eat the food served by him is impossible. Next an Irish girl. She burns his chops. Finally a cowpuncher. He cooks a steak you couldn't cut with a chisel, and Miguel refuses to eat it. This incenses the cowboy, who becomes a veritable tornado of uproarious, volcanic, ferocious exacerbation, that the poor ranchero is anxious for his life. This cyclonic, fire-eating Bombastes Furioso pulls a couple of guns and puts bullet holes in everything, besides otherwise wrecking the place, and leaves the trembling ranchero more dead than alive from fright. Miguel makes his way disconsolately and sheepishly to his daughter's and son-in-law's cabin, where he finds them seated enjoying a peaceful repast. The savory aroma from the well-cooked viands is too alluring and he at once relents for the sake of a hearty meal.

Film reviewer H. A. Downey in The Nickelodeon, another widely read trade journal in 1909, provides in its May edition a far more concise summary of Griffith's screenplay than the one found in The Moving Picture World. (Note: Based in Chicago, the trade journal The Nickelodeon was renamed Motography in 1911.) Downey describes the film as "A verification of the theory that the road to the heart is through the stomach, as set forth in the case of Miguel, who, disapproving of his daughter's marriage, drives her from home, but relents for the sake of a hearty meal."

Another summary of this short's plot is in the extensive 1985 publication Early Motion Pictures: The Paper Print Collection in the Library of Congress. The following was composed by Library of Congress staff after reviewing a paper roll of small photographic prints preserved in the LC's collection. Those prints date from 1909 and were produced directly, frame-by-frame from Biograph's now-lost 35mm master negative of The Road to the Heart:

This comedy, with all the actors in Spanish costumes, begins in a combination dining room and kitchen. A young man (David Miles) enters and proposes marriage to the daughter (Florence Lawrence), but is turned down by her father. There is a heated discussion, and the daughter and mother leave the house. The daughter gets married, and they all set up housekeeping together. The father stubbornly insists he can get along without them. The next scenes show his attempts to do so as he hires and fires an oriental cook, a non-Latin housekeeper, and a cattleman's camp cook who wears chaps and carries two guns. The last scenes show the father attempting to ingratiate himself with his family after his last cook tears up the house because the father refuses to eat his food.

== Cast ==
- David Miles as Miguel, wealthy Mexican ranchero
- Anita Hendrie as Vinuella, Miguel's wife
- Herbert Yost (also credited Barry O'Moore) as José
- Florence Lawrence as Miguel's daughter and José's wife
- John R. Cumpson as Chinese man
- Clara T. Bracy as Irish cook
- Mack Sennett as vaquero (cowboy)
- Arthur V. Johnson as vaquero (cowboy)

== Production ==
The screenplay for this short is credited to director Griffith, who shot the picture at Biograph's headquarters and main studio, which in 1909 were located inside a renovated brownstone mansion at 11 East 14th Street in New York City. Filming was completed in just two days–March 4 and 5, 1909–by Biograph cinematographer Arthur Marvin.

=== Uncredited actors ===
Compiling and verifying cast members in early Biograph productions such as The Road to the Heart is made more difficult by the fact that Biograph, as a matter of company policy, did not begin publicly crediting its performers and identifying them in film-industry publications or in newspapers advertisements until four years after the release of this short. In its April 5, 1913 issue, the Chicago-based trade journal Motography in a news item titled "Biograph Identities Revealed" announces that "at last" Biograph "is ready to make known its players." That news item also informs filmgoers that for the price of ten cents they can purchase a poster from Biograph on which the names and respective portraits of 26 of the company’s principal actors were featured.

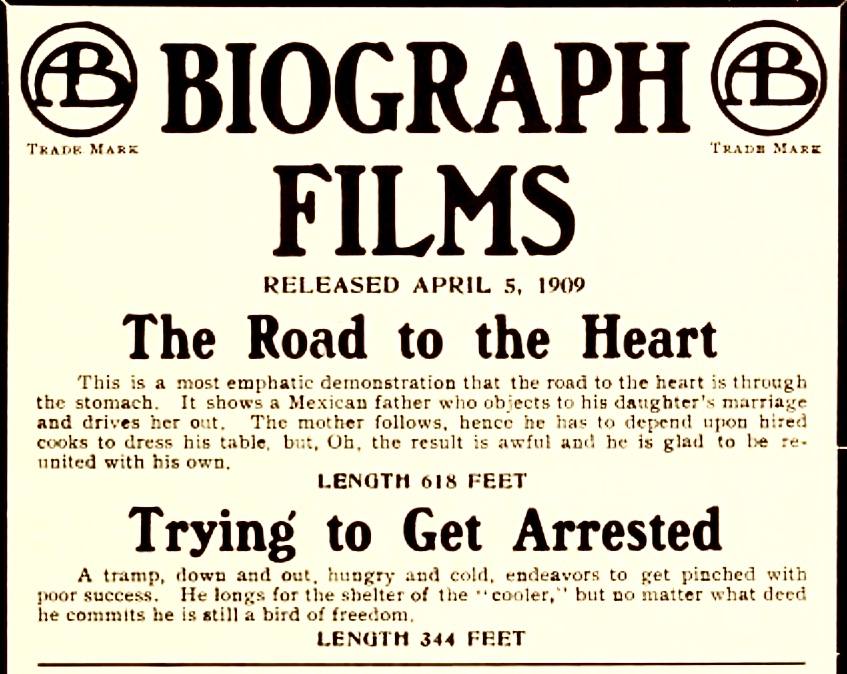
Advertisement in The Moving Picture World for the two "split-reel" releases, 1909

The supporting players were among many early Biograph contractors who performed anonymously and were consistently uncredited for their screen appearances. Florence Lawrence, in the role of Miguel's daughter in this film, was known in 1909 to theater audiences only as the "Biograph Girl", although within a few years after this comedy's release, she would be widely publicized as one of the top actors in the United States' motion-picture industry.

== Release and reception ==
With a film length of 618 feet and an original runtime of between nine and ten minutes, The Road to the Heart was released and distributed by Biograph on a split-reel with the 344-foot comedy Trying to Get Arrested. Few impartial reviews or comments about the film can be found in either 1909 trade publications or in city and small-town newspapers that year. Most newspaper descriptions of the short are contained in theater advertisements that circulated throughput various communities in the weeks and months after the film's release.

== Genre ==
In 1909 publications and more current references, the genre or production designation for The Road to the Heart varies. It is called a drama or dramatic in period release schedules and in Biograph advertisements in trade journals. In theater bills and available newspaper ads, it is sometimes called a drama and more often a comedy. The 1985 book, Early Motion Pictures: The Paper Print Collection in the Library of Congress, and the Internet Movie Database also call it a comedy.

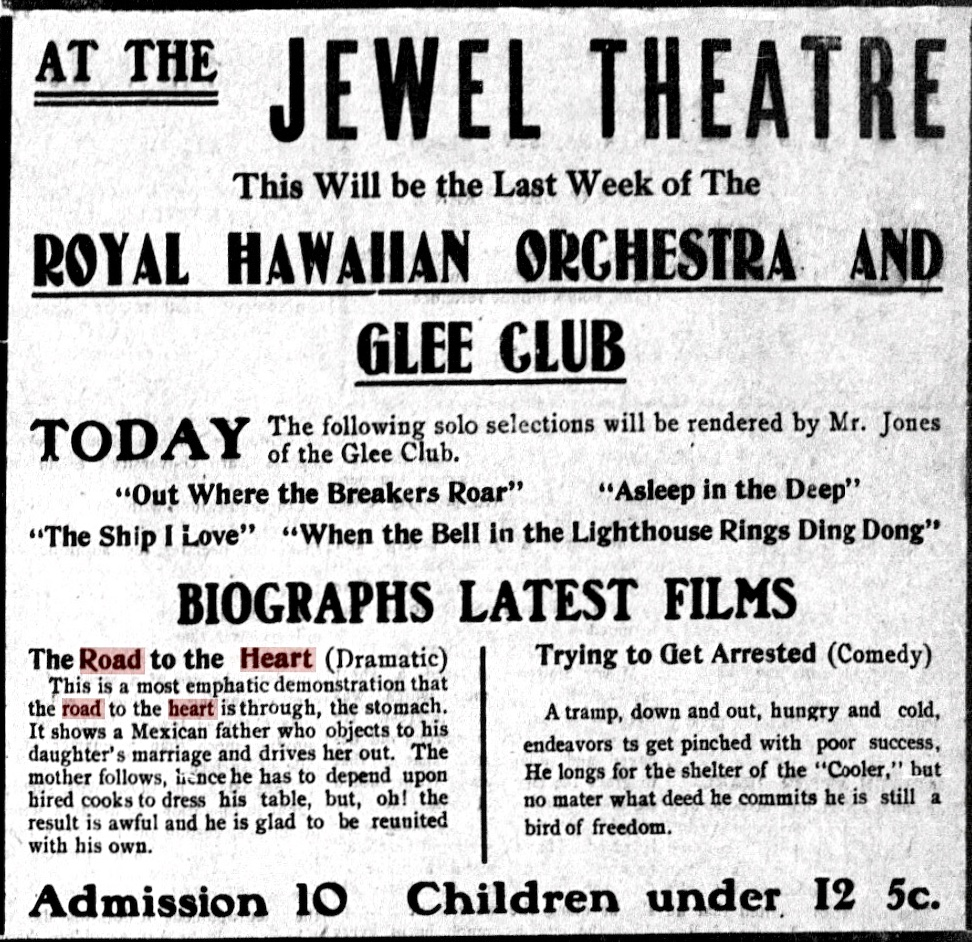
Theatre promotion of the film and also Trying to Get Arrested, Astoria, Oregon, April 1909

In August 1909 the Grand Theater in Brunswick, Georgia promoted the film in the local newspaper as "a very clever farce comedy that is sure to please." The Electric Theatre in Conway, Arkansas, categorizedThe Road to the Heart as "comic" in its lineup of motion pictures, along with its split-reel companion comedy Trying to Get Arrested, which the theatre erroneously labeled He Tries to Be Arrested. On the other hand, the Jewel Theatre in Astoria, Oregon, like Biograph's promotions in trade publications, advertised the short as a "Dramatic". All of these varying descriptions and others have led to general uncertainties about the film's actual genre or type, so much so that the online reference the "Progressive Silent Film List" at Silent Era simply categorizes the short with question marks: "[?]Drama?". Given such uncertainties associated with the presence of both dramatic and comic elements in this short's plot, the production is perhaps best classified as a dramedy.

== Preservation status ==
A visual record of The Road to the Heart does exist. The Library of Congress (LOC) holds a 241-foot roll of paper images printed frame-by-frame directly from the comedy's original 35mm master negative. Submitted by Biograph to the United States government shortly before the film's release, the roll is part of the original documentation required by federal authorities for motion-picture companies to obtain copyright protection for their productions.

While the library's paper print record is not projectable, such paper copies can be transferred onto modern polyester-based safety film stock for screening. In fact, during the 1950s and early 1960s, Kemp R. Niver and other LOC staff restored more than 3,000 early paper rolls of film images from the library's collection and transferred many to safety stock. The UCLA Film and Television Archive, for example, has in its collection such a reproduction, but not one of The Road to the Heart. Instead, the archive has a copy of the first film directed by D. W. Griffith, the short Adventures of Dollie. That projectable reproduction was created from a copy of the LOC's paper print of that 1908 film.

== See also ==
- D. W. Griffith filmography
