= The Valet's Wife =

1908 film directed by D. W. Griffith

- Directed by: D. W. Griffith
- Written by: D. W. Griffith
- Starring: Mack Sennett
- Cinematography: G. W. Bitzer; Arthur Marvin
- Release date: December 5, 1908
- Running time: 8 minutes (one reel)
- Country: United States
- Language: Silent

The Valet's Wife is a 1908 American silent short drama film directed by D. W. Griffith. A print of the film exists in the film archive of George Eastman House.

== Cast ==
- Mack Sennett as Reggie Van Twiller
- Charles Avery as Mr. Tubbs
- George Gebhardt as Dinner Guest
- Robert Harron as Valet
- Guy Hedlund
- Arthur V. Johnson as Reverend Haddock
- Florence Lawrence as Nurse
- Owen Moore
- Harry Solter as Postman / Adoption Agent
