= Arthur V. Johnson =

American actor (1876–1916)

Arthur Vaughan Johnson
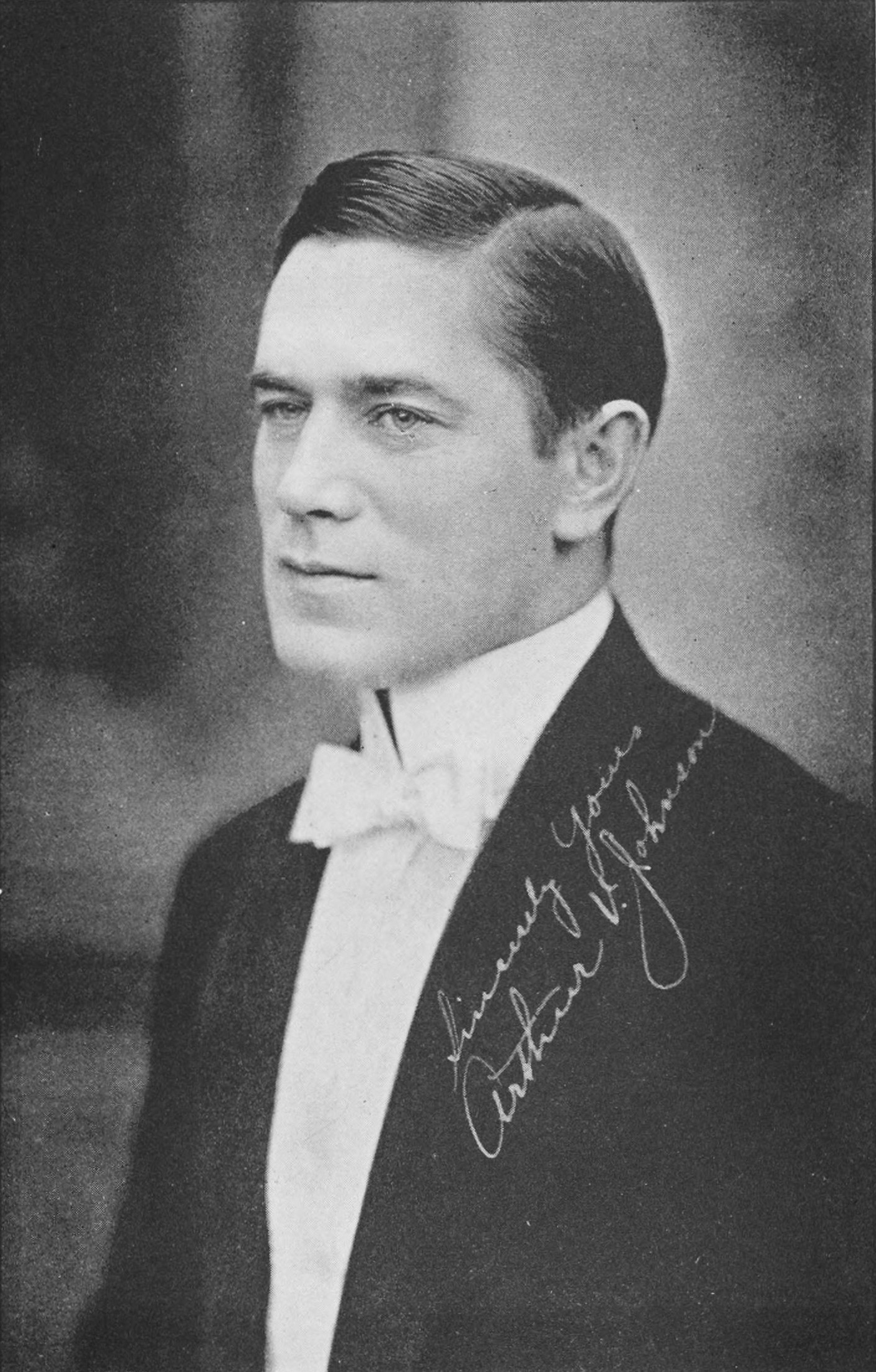
- Johnson in 1915
- Born: February 2, 1876; Cincinnati, Ohio, US
- Died: January 17, 1916 (aged 39); Philadelphia, Pennsylvania, US
- Occupations: Actor; Film director
- Years active: 1905–1915
- Spouses: Maude Webb, Florence Hackett (?)

Arthur Vaughan Johnson (February 2, 1876 – January 17, 1916) was a pioneer actor and director of the early American silent film era, and uncle of Olympic wrestler and film actor Nat Pendleton.

== Career ==
Johnson was born in Cincinnati, Ohio, the son of Rev. Myron A. Johnson. He left college at 19 to join a traveling Shakespearean troupe, later appearing on stage with Sol Smith Russell, Robert B. Mantell and Marie Wainwright. Johnson began as a film actor in 1905 with the Edison Studios in The Bronx, New York, appearing in the one-reel drama The White Caps, directed by Wallace McCutcheon, Sr. and Edwin S. Porter. In 1908, he went to work for Biograph Studios, where he acted in films directed by D.W. Griffith including Resurrection (1909) and In Old California (1910), the first movie Griffith ever shot in Hollywood. At Biograph, Arthur Johnson performed with stars such as Mary Pickford and Florence Lawrence. Johnson was reputed to be Griffith's favorite actor.

In 1911, he accepted an offer from Lubin Studios in Philadelphia that allowed him to direct as well as act. With Lottie Briscoe, his frequent co-star at Lubin, Johnson directed and starred in The Belovéd Adventurer (1914), a 15 episode serial by Emmett Campbell Hall. After performing in more than 300 silent film shorts and directing 26, health problems ended his career in 1915.

== Personal life ==
According to an interview published nine months before his death a few weeks short of his fortieth birthday in 1916, Arthur V. Johnson married actress Maude Webb around 1896; the couple had a daughter who lived with Johnson's parents. Two other sources indicate Johnson married Florence Hackett around 1910, with whom he later appeared in the 1913 film Power of the Cross. He died of tuberculosis in Philadelphia, followed by funeral services there. His remains were later interred at Fairview Cemetery, Chicopee, Massachusetts, near Grace Episcopal Church, where his father once served as rector.

He was second cousin to author, illustrator, and photographer Clifton Johnson.

== Selected filmography ==
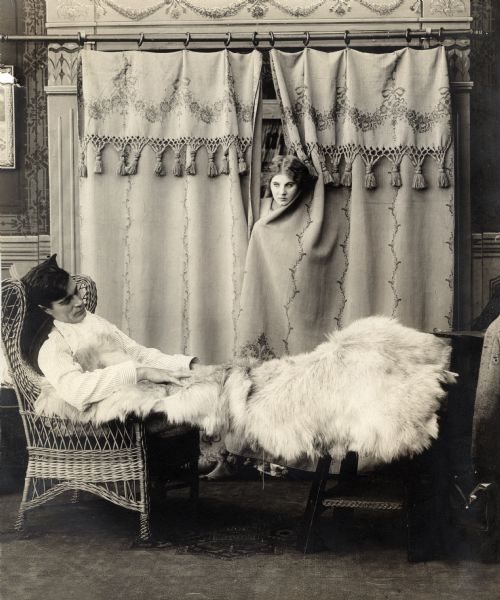
Florence Lawrence peeps through curtains to look at Johnson in a scene still for the Lubin 1911 silent drama One on Reno.

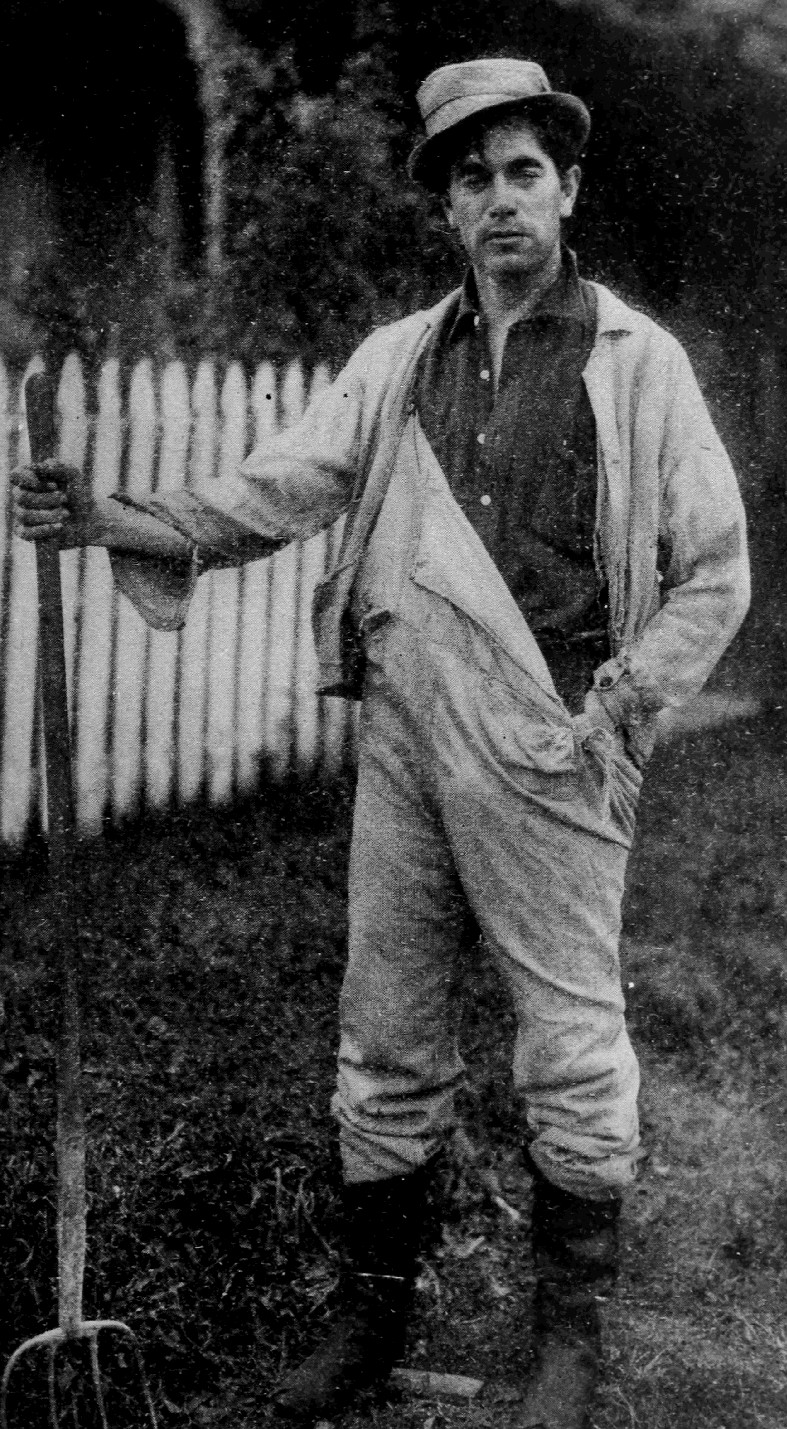
Johnson in 1914

- The Adventures of Dollie (1908)
- The Fight for Freedom (1908)
- The Taming of the Shrew (1908)
- Romance of a Jewess (1908)
- The Bandit's Waterloo (1908)
- The Greaser's Gauntlet (1908)
- For a Wife's Honor (1908)
- The Girl and the Outlaw (1908)
- The Red Girl (1908)
- Where the Breakers Roar (1908)
- A Smoked Husband (1908)
- The Devil (1908)
- The Zulu's Heart (1908)
- Ingomar, the Barbarian (1908)
- The Vaquero's Vow (1908)
- The Planter's Wife (1908)
- Concealing a Burglar (1908)
- The Pirate's Gold (1908)
- The Guerrilla (1908)
- The Song of the Shirt (1908)
- The Ingrate (1908)
- A Woman's Way (1908)
- The Clubman and the Tramp (1908)
- The Call of the Wild (1908)
- The Valet's Wife (1908)
- The Feud and the Turkey (1908)
- The Reckoning (1908)
- The Test of Friendship (1908)
- The Christmas Burglars (1908)
- Mr. Jones at the Ball (1908)
- The Helping Hand (1908)
- One Touch of Nature (1909)
- The Honor of Thieves (1909)
- Love Finds a Way (1909)
- The Sacrifice (1909)
- The Criminal Hypnotist (1909)
- The Fascinating Mrs. Francis (1909)
- Mr. Jones Has a Card Party (1909)
- The Welcome Burglar (1909)
- The Road to the Heart (1909)
- A Sound Sleeper (1909)
- The Cord of Life (1909)
- The Girls and Daddy (1909)
- The Brahma Diamond (1909)
- Edgar Allan Poe (1909)
- A Wreath in Time (1909)
- A Rude Hostess (1909)
- Tragic Love (1909)
- The Golden Louis (1909)
- A Drunkard's Reformation (1909)
- Resurrection (1909)
- The Sealed Room (1909)
- The Hessian Renegades (1909)
- The Death Disc: A Story of the Cromwellian Period (1909)
- To Save Her Soul (1909)
- The Day After (1909)
- The Little Darling (1909)
- The Prussian Spy (1909)
- His Wife's Mother (1909)
- The Wooden Leg (1909)
- The Roue's Heart (1909)
- I Did It (1909)
- The Deception (1909)
- And a Little Child Shall Lead Them (1909)
- A Burglar's Mistake (1909)
- Two Memories (1909)
- Comata, the Sioux (1909)
- Pippa Passes (1909)
- Nursing a Viper (1909)
- All on Account of the Milk (1910)
- In Old California (1910)
- The Two Brothers (1910)
- A Romance of the Western Hills (1910)
- The Lily of the Tenements (1911)
- Divided Interests (1911)
- The Physician's Honor (1912)
- The Antique Ring (1912)
- Gingerbread Cupid (1912)
- A Matter of Business (1912)
- The Preacher and the Gossips (1912)
- The Spoiled Child (1912)
- A Child's Devotion (1912)
