= Queena Mario =

American opera singer (1896–1951)

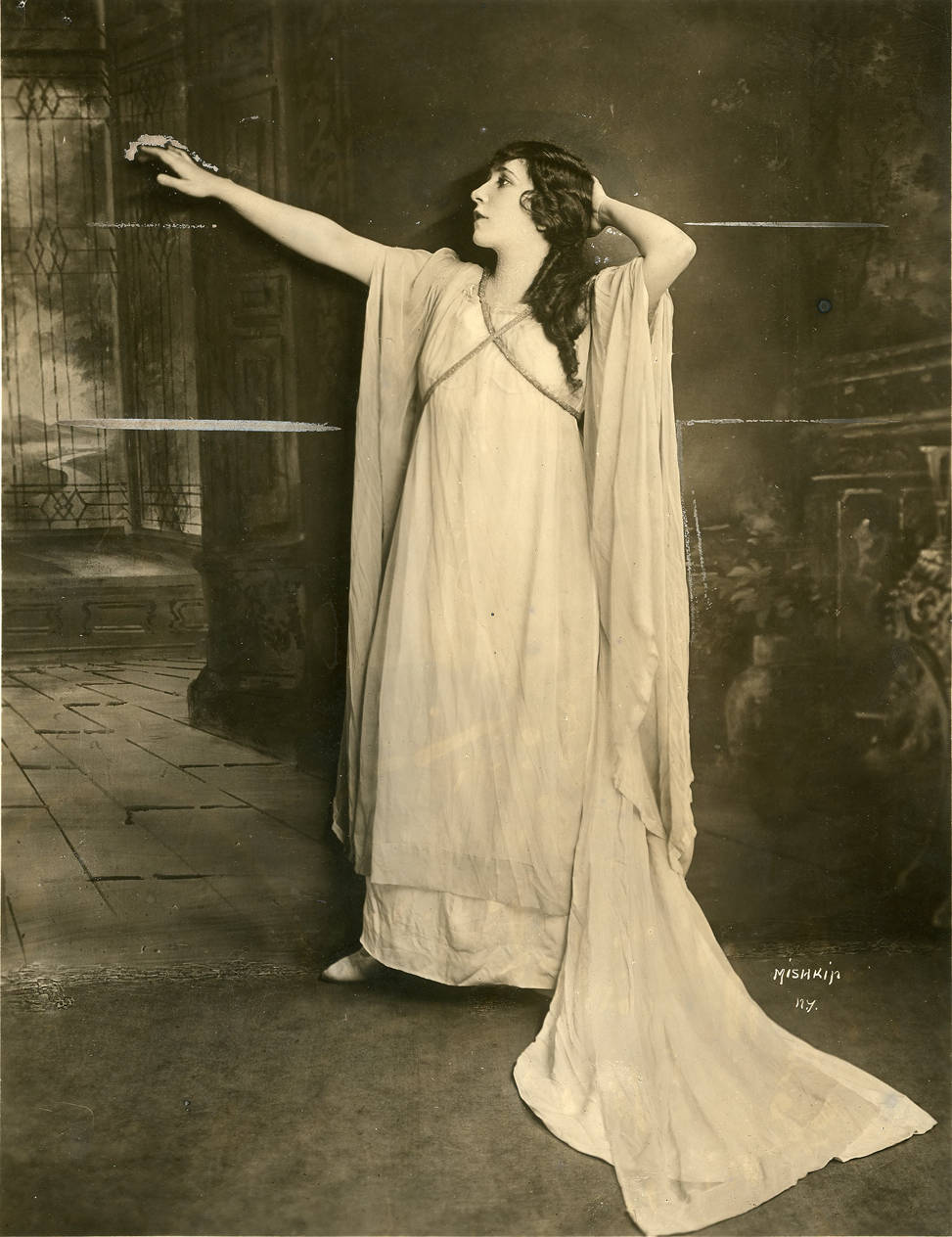
- Mario in 1921

Background information
- Born: Queena Marion Tillotson; August 21, 1896; Akron, Ohio, United States
- Died: May 28, 1951 (aged 54) New York, United States
- Genres: Opera
- Occupations: Soprano; columnist; voice teacher; author
- Years active: 1918–1951

Queena Marion Tillotson (August 21, 1896 – May 28, 1951), known professionally as Queena Mario, was an American soprano opera singer, newspaper columnist, voice teacher, and fiction writer.

== Early life ==
Queena Marion Tillotson was born in Akron, Ohio, the daughter of James Knox Tillotson and Rose Tillotson. Queena was raised in Plainfield, New Jersey, where she graduated from Plainfield High School. She studied voice with Marcella Sembrich, who advised her name change. She paid for voice lessons by writing newspaper advice columns under the name Florence Bryant, including childrearing advice; "You know a lot when you're 16, you have a lot of theories," she explained of her qualifications.

== Career ==
Mario made her stage debut with Fortune Gallo’s San Carlo Opera Company in 1918. She also toured with the Antonio Scotti Opera Company. She sang at the Metropolitan Opera over 300 times, beginning in 1922 and with a last performance in 1938. She also gave concerts. In 1925 Richard Aldrich of The New York Times described Mario's voice: "The voice is light, it has the grace and flexibility of a light voice, together with agreeable quality and much finished skill in vocalism."

Mario taught voice at the Juilliard School in New York and the Curtis Institute of Music in Philadelphia. Among her students were Jeanne Madden, Frances Bible, Helen Jepson and Rose Bampton. She can be heard on at least six recordings from 1924 and 1933, made for the Victor Talking Machine Company.

As a writer, Mario published three opera-themed murder mysteries: Murder in the Opera House (E.P. Dutton, 1934), Murder Meets Mephisto (1942), and Death Drops Delilah (1944).

== Personal life ==
Mario married Metropolitan Opera conductor Wilfred Pelletier on November 23, 1925; they divorced on August 12, 1936. She died in New York in 1951, aged 54 years.
