= The Roue's Heart =

1909 film directed by D. W. Griffith

- Directed by: D. W. Griffith
- Written by: D. W. Griffith
- Starring: Harry Solter
- Cinematography: G. W. Bitzer
- Release date: March 8, 1909
- Running time: 8 minutes (one reel)
- Country: United States
- Language: Silent

The Roue's Heart is a 1909 American silent short drama film directed by D. W. Griffith.

== Cast ==
- Harry Solter as Monsieur Flamant
- Linda Arvidson as Noblewoman / Sculptress's Friend
- John R. Cumpson as Nobleman
- Adele DeGarde as Sculptress's Model
- Gladys Egan as Child
- Anita Hendrie as Noblewoman
- Charles Inslee as Nobleman
- Arthur V. Johnson as Nobleman / Servant
- Florence Lawrence as Noblewoman
- Marion Leonard as Sculptress
- David Miles as Nobleman (unconfirmed)
- Owen Moore as Nobleman
- Barry O'Moore as Nobleman (as Herbert Yost)
- Mack Sennett as Servant
- Dorothy West as Sculptress's Friend
