= Concealing a Burglar =

1908 film directed by D. W. Griffith

- Directed by: D. W. Griffith
- Written by: D. W. Griffith
- Starring: Arthur V. Johnson
- Cinematography: G. W. Bitzer
- Production company: American Mutoscope & Biography Company
- Distributed by: American Mutoscope & Biography Company
- Release date: October 30, 1908
- Running time: 11 minutes (one reel)
- Country: United States
- Language: Silent

Concealing a Burglar is a 1908 American silent short drama film directed by D. W. Griffith. This film was published by the American Mutoscope & Biography Company, later shortened to the Biograph Company. D. W. Griffith worked with the Biograph Company for 5 years and is said to directed all Biograph films from 1908-1909.

== Plot ==
Mrs. Brown and Mr. Brown are getting ready for a banquet. Mrs. Brown takes a necklace from a jewelry case but while rushing does not put it on. When the couple are at the banquet Mrs. Brown realizes she is not wearing the necklace and seems distraught. Mr. Brown reassures his wife that the necklace is safe at home. Mr. Wells, an attendee at the banquet, overhears this. He fakes being sick and heads to the Browns' home. However, right as Mr. Wells is going to leave with his stolen goods the Browns return home. Mr. Wells quickly places the necklace back on the dresser and hides behind a curtain. Mr. Brown, having a few drinks, wants cigars and goes out to buy some. Seemingly alone in the house, Mrs. Brown heads to bed. Mr. Wells uses this chance to manipulate Mrs. Brown. He tells her to help hide him or he will tell Mr. Brown that he is his wife's lover. Mrs. Brown decides to hide Mr. Wells in the closet. When Mr. Brown returns home he goes to hang up his coat, this prompts Mr. Wells to attempt to find a new spot to hide. Mr. Wells fails to find a new hiding place and is caught by Mr. Brown. Just as he threatened before, he claims that he is Mrs. Brown's lover. This causes Mr. Brown to accuse his wife. Mrs. Brown tries to convince her husband of the truth, that Mr. Wells is a thief and a liar. Yet, Mr. Brown is still unconvinced. He hands his wife a pistol and tells her to shoot Mr. Wells, as he is either her lover or a thief. Mrs. Brown does not want to kill Mr. Wells but just then he raises a gun to shoot her husband. This causes Mrs. Brown to shoot Mr. Well's wrist, causing him to drop the gun. After hearing this commotion some policemen burst through the door and arrest Mr. Wells. In his pockets they find lots of valuables, proving Mrs. Brown's story. Mr. Brown then begs for his wife's forgiveness, as it is now clear he wrongfully believed Mrs. Wells.

== Cast ==
- Arthur V. Johnson as Mr. Brown
- Florence Lawrence as Mrs. Brown
- Harry Solter as Mr. Wells
- Linda Arvidson
- George Gebhardt as Dinner Guest
- Robert Harron as Valet
- Jeanie MacPherson as Dinner Guest
- Mack Sennett as The Waiter / A Policeman
