= The Criminal Hypnotist =

1909 film directed by D. W. Griffith

- Directed by: D. W. Griffith
- Written by: D. W. Griffith
- Starring: Owen Moore
- Cinematography: G. W. Bitzer
- Release date: January 18, 1909
- Running time: 10 minutes (one reel)
- Country: United States
- Language: Silent

The Criminal Hypnotist is a 1909 American silent short drama film directed by D. W. Griffith.

== Cast ==
- Owen Moore as The Man
- Marion Leonard as The Man's Fiancée
- Arthur V. Johnson as The Criminal Hypnotist
- David Miles as The Robbery Victim / Party Guest
- Charles Inslee as The Professor / Party Guest
- George Gebhardt as The Professor's Assistant / A Policeman / Party Guest
- Harry Solter as The Doctor
- Florence Lawrence as The Maid
- Linda Arvidson as Party Guest
- Anita Hendrie as Party Guest
- Jeanie MacPherson as Party Guest
- Tom Moore as Party Guest (unconfirmed)
- Herbert Yost (also credited Barry O'Moore) as Party Guest
- Mack Sennett as Party Guest
