= The Bandit's Waterloo =

- Directed by: D. W. Griffith
- Written by: D. W. Griffith
- Starring: Charles Inslee; Linda Arvidson; Marion Leonard
- Release date: August 4, 1908
- Running time: 7 minutes
- Country: United States
- Languages: Silent; English intertitles

The Bandit's Waterloo is a 1908 silent American drama film directed by D. W. Griffith.

== Cast ==
- Charles Inslee as Bandit leader
- Linda Arvidson as Accomplice / Woman at Inn
- Marion Leonard as Kidnapped woman
- Harry Solter as Police Sergeant
- Arthur V. Johnson
- Florence Lawrence

== See also ==
- D. W. Griffith filmography
- List of American films of 1908
