= The Deception (film) =

1909 film directed by D. W. Griffith

- Directed by: D. W. Griffith
- Written by: D. W. Griffith
- Based on: A Service of Love; 1903 story in The Four Million by O. Henry
- Starring: Barry O'Moore; Florence Lawrence; Harry Solter
- Cinematography: G. W. Bitzer
- Distributed by: American Mutoscope and Biograph Co.
- Release date: March 22, 1909
- Running time: 7 minutes (one reel)
- Country: United States
- Language: Silent

The Deception is a 1909 American silent short drama film directed by D. W. Griffith.

== Cast ==
- Herbert Yost (also credited Barry O'Moore) as Harvey Colton
- Florence Lawrence as Mabel Colton
- Linda Arvidson
- Adele DeGarde as At Laundry
- Anita Hendrie as At Laundry
- Charles Inslee as Landlord
- Arthur V. Johnson as Man in Top Hat / Rich Patron's Secretary
- Min Johnson as At Laundry
- David Miles as At Laundry / At Conservatory
- Owen Moore as Rich Patron
- Mack Sennett as Doctor
- Harry Solter as Harvey's Friend
- Dorothy West as At Laundry
