= Comata, the Sioux =

1909 film directed by D. W. Griffith

- Directed by: D. W. Griffith
- Written by: Stanner E. V. Taylor; E. S. Hirsch
- Produced by: American Mutoscope and Biograph Company
- Starring: James Kirkwood; Marion Leonard; Arthur V. Johnson
- Cinematography: G. W. Bitzer
- Distributed by: American Mutoscope and Biograph Company
- Release date: September 9, 1909
- Running time: one reel; 10 minutes
- Country: United States
- Languages: Silent; English intertitles

Comata, the Sioux is a 1909 American short silent Western film directed by D. W. Griffith. It was produced and released by the American Mutoscope and Biograph Company.

== Plot ==
Comata is in love with the daughter of the tribal chief, Clear Eyes, but she runs off to marry a white cowboy named Bud Watkins. Two years later, she returns to the Sioux time after being abandoned by her husband for a white woman, who believed him single. Comata exposes Bud and shows their child as evidence of their relationship, and he later kills Bud. Both Comata and Clear Eyes meet back up on top of a mountain, and he holds her child as they walk home.

== Cast ==
- James Kirkwood as Comata, the Sioux
- Marion Leonard as Clear Eyes
- Arthur V. Johnson as Bud Watkins
- Linda Arvidson as Nellie Howe
- Verner Clarges as Father/Indian Chief

== See also ==
- D. W. Griffith filmography
