= The Guerrilla (1908 film) =

1908 film directed by D. W. Griffith

- Directed by: D. W. Griffith
- Written by: D. W. Griffith
- Starring: Arthur V. Johnson
- Cinematography: G. W. Bitzer; Arthur Marvin
- Release date: November 13, 1908
- Running time: 14 minutes (898 feet)
- Country: United States
- Language: Silent

The Guerrilla is a 1908 American silent short drama film directed by D. W. Griffith.

== Cast ==
- Arthur V. Johnson as Jack Stanford
- Dorothy West as Dorothy
- George Gebhardt as Confederate Soldier
- Charles Inslee as Servant
- Owen Moore
- Harry Myers
- Herbert Yost (Barry O'Moore) as Confederate Soldier / Union Soldier
- Mack Sennett as Confederate Soldier / Union Soldier
- Harry Solter as Confederate Soldier / Union Soldier
