= The Ingrate =

1908 film directed by D. W. Griffith

- Directed by: D. W. Griffith
- Written by: D. W. Griffith
- Starring: Arthur V. Johnson
- Cinematography: G. W. Bitzer; Arthur Marvin
- Release date: November 20, 1908
- Running time: 15 minutes (one reel)
- Country: United States
- Language: Silent

The Ingrate is a 1908 American silent short drama film directed by D. W. Griffith.

== Cast ==
- Arthur V. Johnson as The Trapper
- Florence Lawrence as The Trapper's Wife
- George Gebhardt as The Canuck
