= The Brahma Diamond =

1909 film directed by D. W. Griffith

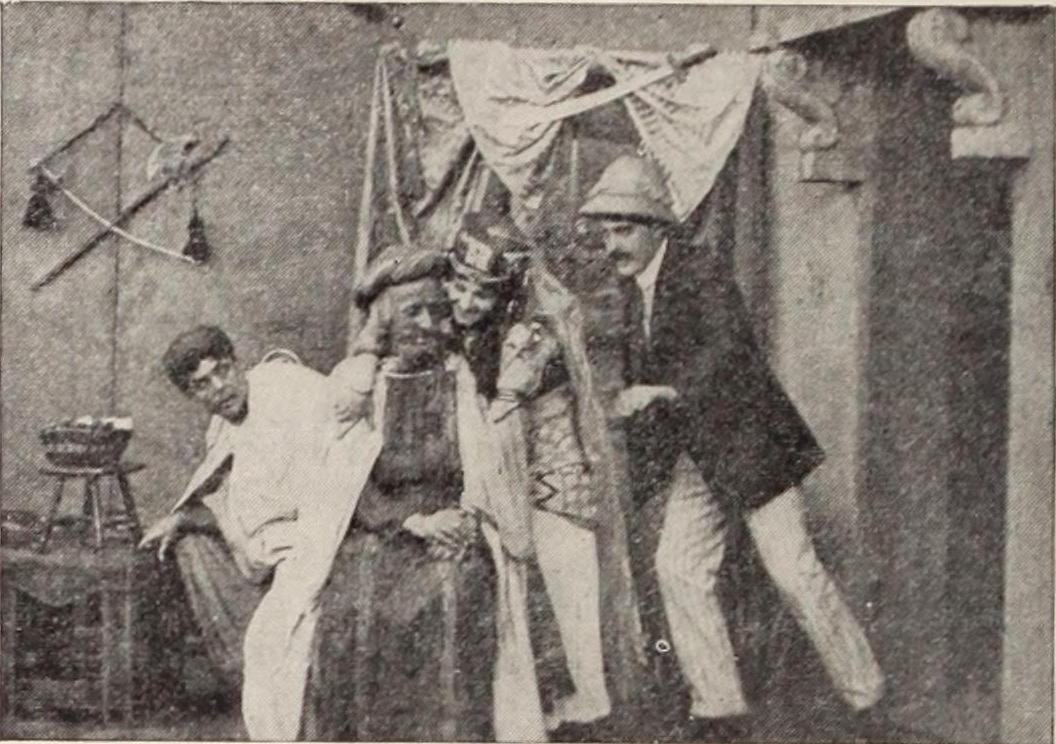
- Directed by: D. W. Griffith
- Written by: D. W. Griffith
- Starring: Harry Solter
- Cinematography: G. W. Bitzer
- Production company: Biograph Studios
- Distributed by: Biograph Studios
- Release date: February 4, 1909
- Running time: 11 minutes (one reel)
- Country: United States
- Language: Silent

The Brahma Diamond is a 1909 American silent short drama film directed by D. W. Griffith. An incomplete version of the film survives.

== Plot ==
According to a film magazine, "It was at the Hindu City of Cawnpore on a feast day that the faithful assembled in the temple of worship at the shrine of Brahma. In this Hindu pantheon there are gathered natives of the Ganges Valley, also a generous sprinkling of Western tourists, they being drawn thither by their thirst of sightseeing. In the forehead of the idol there is embedded a mammoth diamond of fabulous value. This is termed the "Light of the World." Among the tourists there is one who, a stranger in a strange land, finds himself in a most depleted condition as regards finances. Extravagant and improvident, he is piling up a bill at the Cownpore Hotel without funds to meet. The sight of this diamond at once arouses his cupidity and he determines to secure it at any hazard. A visit to the temple shows that the Brahma is attended by one veiled guard. He also learns that this guard has a sweetheart who visits him during his lonely vigil. Enlisting the services of an unscrupulous Hindu they follow the girl to her home where they force her and her father to go with them to the temple, where, under threat of her father's murder, she gives drugged wine to her lover, the guard. He immediately falls in a stupor and binding the father and girl the tourist seizes the diamond and makes his way back to the hotel. Recovering his senses, the guard gives alarm, and he and the girl are taken to prison, where he is doomed to die at the end of three days for the desecration of Brahma.

The girl, however, offers to remain hostage if her lover be allowed to search for the diamond. This noble offer is accepted and the girl is chained to the floor of the dungeon, while the guard, humiliated by the confiscation of his royal turban, according to the law, is set free to bring back if he can the diamond. Should he not succeed in the allotted time — three days — the girl will pay the penalty with her life. He first wishes to the Yogi, the royal seer, who shows him on the mystic mirror the face of the robber. The guard at once recognizes him as the tourist who had visited the temple, and at once sets out to find him, which he does at the hotel, just after the tourist has sewed the diamond up in the handle of his suit case. He contrives to engage himself as a servant and as such makes a fruitless search of the tourist's effects. He is on the point of despairing when the tourist is called upon by a diamond merchant. Effecting his presence in the room by hypnotic power, the guard manages to secure the diamond and dashing madly back to the dungeon arrives just in time to stay the uplifted simitar from the neck of the faithful girl."

== Cast ==
- Harry Solter as A Tourist
- George Gebhardt as A Guard
- Florence Lawrence as The Guard's Sweetheart
- David Miles as The Guard's Sweetheart's Father
- Charles Inslee as An Unscrupulous Hindu
- Arthur V. Johnson as Executioner
- John R. Cumpson as Tourist
- Edward Dillon
- Robert Harron as Native Servant
- Anita Hendrie as Tourist
- Marion Leonard as Dancer (unconfirmed)
- Owen Moore
- Barry O'Moore as Tourist (as Herbert Yost)
- Mack Sennett as A Guard / A Servant / Hotel Manager
- Dorothy West as Tourist
