= The Planter's Wife (1908 film) =

1908 film directed by D. W. Griffith

- Directed by: D. W. Griffith
- Written by: D. W. Griffith
- Starring: Arthur V. Johnson
- Cinematography: G. W. Bitzer
- Release date: October 20, 1908
- Running time: 14 minutes (one reel)
- Country: United States
- Language: Silent

The Planter's Wife is a 1908 American silent short drama film directed by D. W. Griffith. It is adaptation of the 1880s play of the same name by James K. Tillotson.

== Cast ==
- Arthur V. Johnson as John Holland
- Claire McDowell as Mrs. John Holland
- Harry Solter as Tom Roland
- Florence Lawrence as Tomboy Nellie
- George Gebhardt as Boatman
- Linda Arvidson
- Charles Inslee
