= Anita Hendrie =

American actress

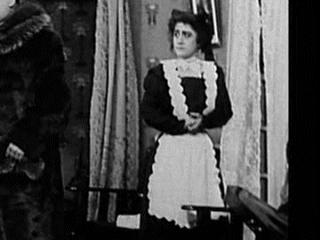
- Hendrie in The Voice of the Violin (1909)
- Born: 1867 or 1868; Philadelphia, Pennsylvania
- Died: April 15, 1940, aged 72; Brooklyn, New York
- Occupation: Actress
- Years active: 1908–1912

Anita Hendrie (1867 or 1868 – April 15, 1940) was an American actress who appeared in 67 silent films between 1908 and 1912, and in several stock theater and vaudeville plays since 1899.

Hendrie was born in Philadelphia, Pennsylvania, the daughter of William Scott Hendrie and M. Louise Morton. Her father was a surgeon. Her grandfathers were John Martin, a signer of the Declaration of Independence, and painter Benjamin West.

Hendrie acted with the stock company at Forepaugh's Theater in Cincinnati until going to work in Salt Lake City in 1907. She died at her home in Brooklyn at age 72 on April 15, 1940. Her grave is in Milford, Connecticut.

== Selected filmography ==
- The Helping Hand (1908) – Jessie Marshall
- The Maniac Cook (1909) – Margie the cook
- The Honor of Thieves (1909) – at dance
- Love Finds a Way (1909) – duchess
- A Sound Sleeper (1909) – an "ash" woman
- Those Boys! (1909) – the mother
- Edgar Allen Poe (1909) – the second publisher's wife
- A Wreath in Time (1909) – actress on stage/at stage door
- The Golden Louis (1909) – mother or old woman
- The Criminal Hypnotist (1909) – party guest
- The Road to the Heart (1909) – Miguel's wife
- Trying to Get Arrested (1909) – assaulted woman
- A Rude Hostess (1909) — gentleman burglar
- Schneider's Anti-Noise Crusade — violinist
- The Fascinating Mrs. Francis (1909) – young man's father
- Mr. Jones Has a Card Party (1909) – a guest
- The Lonely Villa (1909) – the maid
- The Welcome Burglar (1909) – in office
- The Cord of Life (1909) – in tenement
- The Girls and Daddy (1909) – in the post office
- The Brahma Diamond (1909) – as a tourist
- Tragic Love (1909) – the landlady/the thieves' accomplice/in the factory
- His Wife's Mother (1909)
- The Roue's Heart (1909)
- I Did It (1909)
- The Deception (1909)
- And a Little Child Shall Lead Them (1909)
- Two Memories (1909)
- Lady Helen's Escapade (1909) (erroneously credited as Anita Henrie)
