= The Fascinating Mrs. Francis =

1909 film directed by D. W. Griffith

- Directed by: D. W. Griffith
- Written by: D. W. Griffith
- Starring: Marion Leonard
- Cinematography: G. W. Bitzer
- Release date: January 21, 1909
- Running time: 5 minutes (one reel)
- Country: United States
- Language: Silent

The Fascinating Mrs. Francis is a 1909 American silent short comedy film directed by D. W. Griffith. The Internet Movie Database lists Mary Pickford as appearing in this short. However, Pickford did not begin with Biograph until the end of April 1909.

== Cast ==
- Marion Leonard as Mrs. Francis
- Barry O'Moore as Young Man (as Herbert Yost)
- Anita Hendrie as Young Man's Mother
- Harry Solter as Young Man's Father
- Gertrude Robinson as The Maid / Party Guest
- Linda Arvidson
- John R. Cumpson as Party Guest
- George Gebhardt as Party Guest
- Guy Hedlund as Party Guest
- Charles Inslee as Party Guest
- Arthur V. Johnson as Party Guest
- Florence Lawrence as Visitor
- Mack Sennett as Party Guest
- Charles West
