= Edgar Allen Poe (film) =

1909 film directed by D. W. Griffith

Edgar Allen Poe (official title)
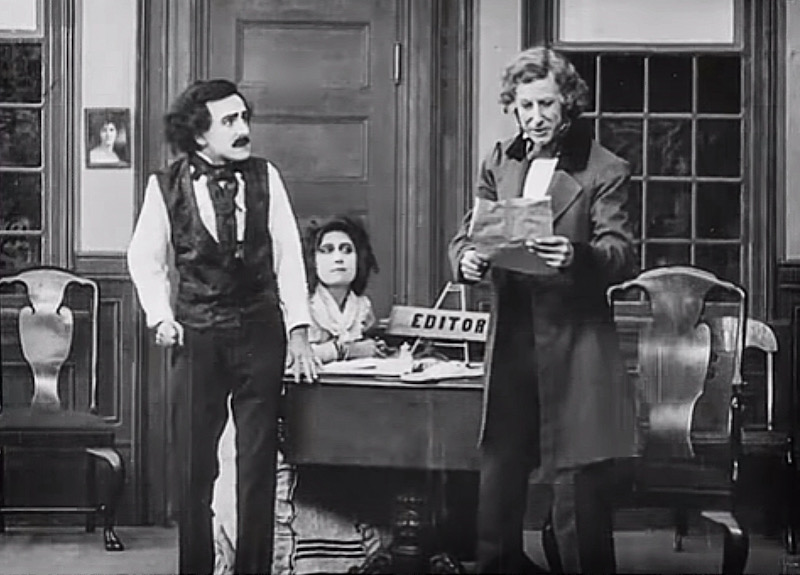
- Film still of actor Herbert Yost (left) as Poe with Anita Hendrie and David Miles
- Directed by: D. W. Griffith
- Written by: D. W. Griffith; Frank E. Woods
- Produced by: Biograph Company; New York, N.Y.
- Starring: Herbert Yost; Linda Arvidson
- Cinematography: G. W. Bitzer
- Release date: February 8, 1909
- Running time: 6–7 minutes (release length 450 feet); distributed on a "split reel" with another film, A Wreath in Time
- Country: United States
- Languages: Silent; English intertitles

Edgar Allen Poe [sic] is a 1909 American silent drama film produced by the Biograph Company of New York and directed and co-written by D. W. Griffith. Herbert Yost stars in this short as the 19th-century American writer and poet Edgar Allan Poe, while Linda Arvidson portrays Poe's wife Virginia. When it was released in February 1909 and throughout its theatrical run, the film was consistently identified and advertised with Poe's middle name misspelled in its official title, using an "e" instead of the correct second "a". The short was also originally shipped to theaters on a "split reel", which was a single reel that accommodated more than one film. This 450-foot drama shared its reel with another Biograph short, the 558-foot comedy A Wreath in Time. Prints of both films survive.

== Plot ==
The film focuses on Edgar Allan Poe and his wife Virginia Clemm, who is bedridden and seriously ill. While Poe comforts her, a raven suddenly appears on a bust of Pallas displayed on a high shelf in her room. Inspired by the sight, Poe writes "The Raven", his greatest poetic work. He then leaves, hoping to sell the poem to a local newspaper or book publisher so he can buy much-needed food and medicines for Virginia. At a newspaper office, the first potential buyer rejects the creation. Desperate for money, Poe rushes to another publisher's office, where a man and a woman are busy editing. Initially, one editor dismisses Poe's poem, but the other one reads the work, likes it, and pays him for it. Poe then uses the money to buy a basket of food and other items for his wife. Virginia is still lying in bed when he returns home, where he proudly unfolds a new blanket he also purchased, but as he places the blanket on her, he realizes that she had died while he was gone. Poe is devastated by her loss, and the film ends with him crying over her body.

== Cast ==
- Herbert Yost as Edgar Allan Poe (Note: In all early Biograph production records, film actor "Barry O'Moore" is consistently listed by his birth name and preferred stage name Herbert Yost, including in the cited reference D. W. Griffith and the Biograph Company. During his acting career, which spanned nearly 50 years, Yost used the screen name of Barry O'Moore for a relatively short time. In his obituaries in 1945, the actor was invariably identified as Herbert Yost.)
- Linda Arvidson as Virginia Poe
- Arthur V. Johnson as publisher at first office
- Charles Perley as "Resident poet" at first office
- David Miles as publisher at second office
- Anita Hendrie as editor at second office

== Production ==
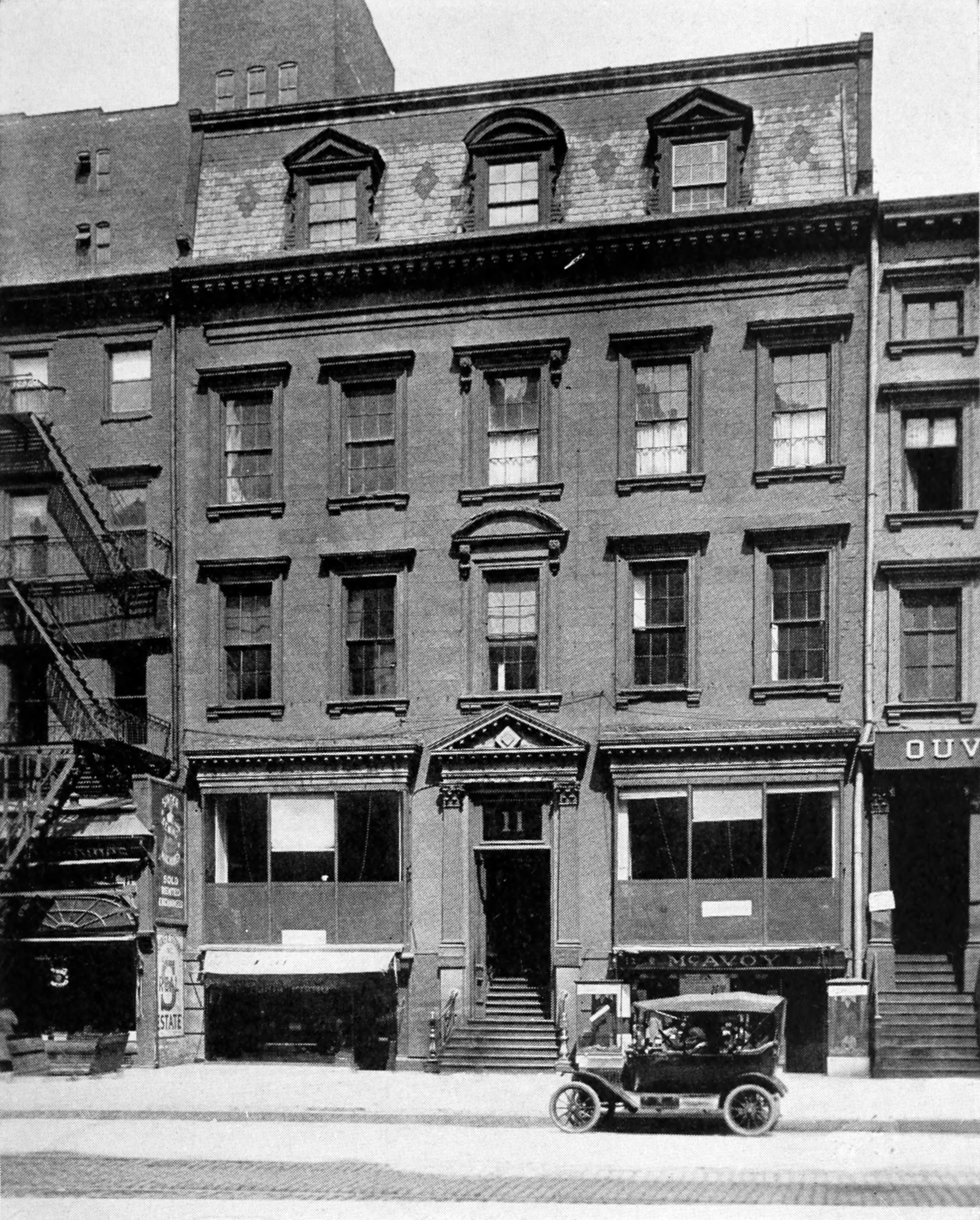
Biograph's Manhattan studio, where Edgar Allen Poe was staged and filmed in two days

The screenplay for this short was co-written by director Griffith and Frank E. Woods. The drama was shot using three interior corner sets at Biograph's headquarters and main studio, which in 1908 and 1909 were located inside a renovated brownstone mansion at 11 East 14th Street in New York City. Filming by company cinematographer G. W. Bitzer was completed in just two days, although records differ as to those exact dates. Profiles on the film at the Library of Congress cite January 21 and 23, 1909, while Biograph production records, which are noted in the 1985 reference D. W. Griffith and the Biograph Company, give earlier dates: December 21 and 23, 1908.

=== Lighting ===
The lighting of sets was invariably a collaborative efforts between director Griffith and his cinematographers, most notably in his work with "Billy" Bitzer. Film historian and university professor Joyce E. Jesionowski in her 1987 book Thinking in Pictures: Dramatic Structure in D. W. Griffith's Biograph Films regards Edgar Allen Poe as a notable one in Griffith's early filmography, a production that illustrates his growing awareness of the power of set lighting in establishing mood and enhancing storylines that, unlike stage plays, relied totally on orchestrating visual elements within a silent medium:

Griffith's most theatrical use of a lighting effect, his most conscious use of light as atmosphere, occurs in a group of films that are less admirable for their construction than for the tone set by their lighting. Edgar Allen Poe [sic] (1909) is such a film, impressive in its pre-expressionist harshness of the contrast between light and shadow in the shots. (Note: In addition to serving as a professor in the Film Department at Binghamton University (SUNY), Joyce E. Jesionowski has also taught film history and production at Columbia University, Pratt Institute, and Hofstra University.)

With further regard to the moody "harshness" of the lighting employed by Griffith and Bitzer in this production, in an introduction to a copy of the short preserved in its film museum, the EYE Institute in the Netherlands states, "Although there is little to distinguish [Edgar Allen Poe] now from its contemporaries, it had new and advanced lighting, notably the so-called 'Rembrandt lighting' or profile portrait-effect." Now a standard lighting technique in cinematography and studio photography, the use of such "Rembrandt lighting" in 1909 predates by six years its credited use in motion pictures, most notably by Cecil B. DeMille in his 1915 production The Warrens of Virginia.

PLAY film; runtime 00:06:42.

=== The short's "anonymous" actors ===
In 1909, Biograph, as a matter of company policy, did not publicly credit its performers or identify them in film-industry publications or in newspapers advertisements. Such recognition would not begin for another four years. In its April 5, 1913 issue, the Chicago-based trade journal Motography in a news item titled "Biograph Identities Revealed" announces that "at last" Biograph "is ready to make known its players." That news item also informs filmgoers that for the price of ten cents they can purchase a poster from Biograph on which the names and respective portraits of 26 of the company’s principal actors and actresses were featured.

The lead actor Herbert Yost in his 19th-century costume, wig, mustache, and makeup bears a striking resemblance to the real writer's general appearance. An experienced stage performer, Yost had adopted the name Barry O'Moore during his early years working in the "infant" film industry, reportedly an identity change made to distinguish his career in the legitimate theatre from the "inferior" medium of screen acting, where pantomime, not the spoken word, defined performances. Despite Yost's use of his alternative name, a name of any type was essentially irrelevant while he worked for Biograph in 1908 and 1909, years in which the company did not credit its performers. In available production records from that period, the actor is not cited as Barry O'Moore, only as Herbert Yost.

Linda Arvidson, who portrays Poe's wife Virginia in this production, was actually the wife of D. W. Griffith at the time. If fact, the couple had been secretly married three years earlier, in 1906. Biograph's policy of not identifying cast or crew extended as well to both Arvidson and Griffith, neither of whom received a screen credit, any specific recognition in advertisements for the film, nor in any other publicity for Edgar Allen Poe.

== Release and promotion ==
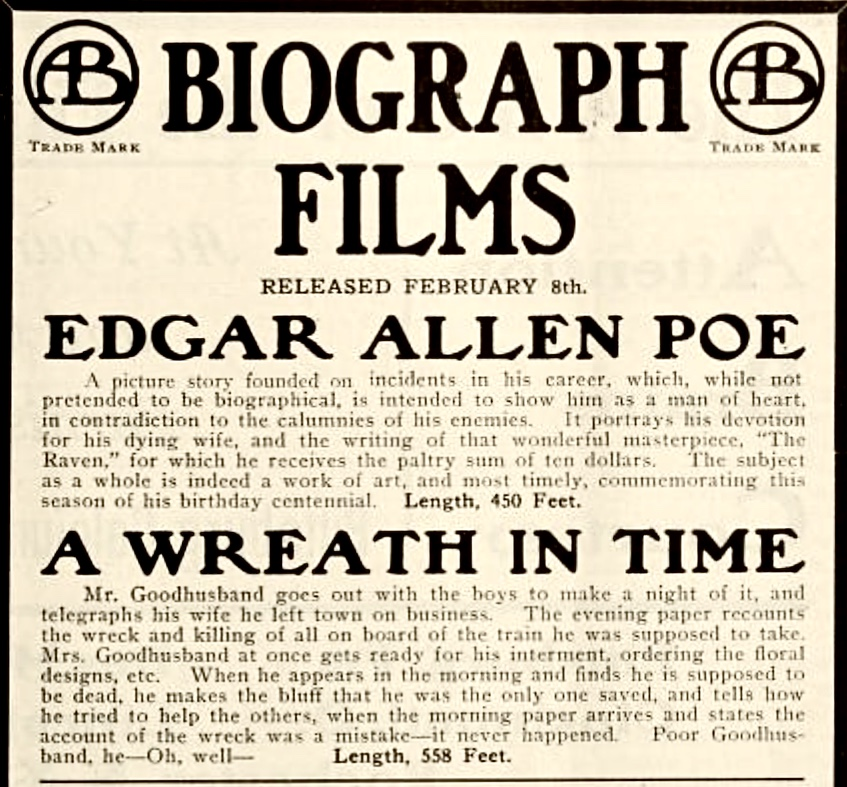
Split-reel promotion of the film with the comedy A Wreath in Time

Just days before the short's release on February 8, 1909, Biograph marketed it as "a work of art" that the company produced to commemorate "this season of [Poe's] birthday centennial." (Note: Although the film was produced in part to mark the centennial of Poe's birth, the short's release date–February 8, 1909–was 20 days after the writer's actual birthday of January 19, 1809.) Less than two weeks later, the Dixie Theatre in Fairmont, West Virginia characterized the "picture play" in its newspaper advertisement as a "'class' production"; and since Biograph, as company policy, did not credit its cast of players on screen or identify them in any promotions for its releases, the theatre's management simply described the presentation of America's "Poetical genius" as being "portrayed by clever Biograph actors." Months later in Georgia, The Brunswick Daily News in its October 27 issue announces that evening's "grand program" at the local Grand Theatre, noting that the "feature picture" would be "one of biograph's [sic] most famous subjects entitled 'Edgar Allen Poe.'" The Brunswick newspaper then adds, "This is one of the most pathetic love stories ever seen in motion pictures." The use of the term "pathetic" within the context of the program announcement was not intended to impart in any way a lack of quality in the drama's portrayal of the Poes' relationship. Instead, the term was employed to underscore the emotional power of the couple's depiction on screen and to indicate the unnamed actors' success in performing the film's sad scenario.

== Preservation status ==
An original 1909 paper roll of contact prints made frame-by-frame from the short's now-lost 35mm master nitrate negative is preserved in the film archive of the Library of Congress (LOC). That paper roll, reduced in size, measures only 161 feet in length instead of the film's full-size release length of 450 feet. Submitted by Biograph in 1909 to the United States government shortly before the film's release, the roll of paper prints is part of the original documentation required by federal authorities when motion-picture companies applied for copyright protection for their productions. While the library's paper print record is not projectable, a negative copy has been transferred onto modern polyester-based safety film stock as well as a positive copy for screening. That work was part of an extensive decade-long preservation project done at the LOC during the 1950s and early 1960s. The project, performed by Kemp R. Niver and other library staff, restored more than 3,000 such paper rolls in the library's collection and transferred most of them, including Edgar Allen Poe, to safety stock. Additional copies of this short are preserved in various film archives in the United States and Europe, including a copy, as previously noted, at the EYE Filmmuseum in the Netherlands.

== See also ==
- Edgar Allan Poe in popular culture
