= The Devil (1908 film) =

1908 film directed by D. W. Griffith

- Directed by: D. W. Griffith
- Written by: D. W. Griffith
- Starring: Harry Solter
- Cinematography: G. W. Bitzer
- Release date: October 2, 1908
- Running time: 10 minutes (one reel)
- Country: United States
- Language: Silent

The Devil is a 1908 American silent short drama film directed by D. W. Griffith. A print of the film exists in the film archive of the Library of Congress.

== Cast ==
- Harry Solter as Harold Thornton
- Claire McDowell as Mrs. Thornton
- George Gebhardt as The Devil
- D. W. Griffith
- Arthur V. Johnson as The Wife's Companion
- Florence Lawrence as A Model
- Jeanie MacPherson
- Mack Sennett as The Waiter
