= I Did It (film) =

1909 film directed by D. W. Griffith

- Directed by: D. W. Griffith
- Written by: D. W. Griffith
- Starring: Adele DeGarde
- Cinematography: G. W. Bitzer
- Release date: March 15, 1909
- Running time: 4 minutes (one reel)
- Country: United States
- Language: Silent

I Did It is a 1909 American silent short drama film directed by D. W. Griffith.

== Cast ==
- Adele DeGarde as Gladys, The Little Girl
- Anita Hendrie as The Mother
- Linda Arvidson as A Visitor
- Gladys Egan as The Little Boy
- Arthur V. Johnson
- Florence Lawrence
- Dorothy West as The Maid
