= For a Wife's Honor =

1908 film directed by D. W. Griffith

- Directed by: D. W. Griffith
- Written by: D. W. Griffith
- Starring: Charles Inslee
- Cinematography: Arthur Marvin
- Release date: August 28, 1908
- Running time: 7-8 minutes (474 feet on release)
- Country: United States
- Language: Silent

For a Wife's Honor is a 1908 American silent short drama film directed by D. W. Griffith.

== Cast ==
- Charles Inslee as Irving Robertson
- Harry Solter as Frank Wilson
- Linda Arvidson as The Maid
- George Gebhardt as Henderson, the Manager
- Charles Gorman
- Arthur V. Johnson
