= A Woman's Way (1908 film) =

1908 silent film by D. W. Griffith

- Directed by: D. W. Griffith
- Written by: D. W. Griffith
- Starring: George Gebhardt
- Cinematography: Arthur Marvin
- Release date: November 24, 1908
- Running time: 11 minutes (one reel)
- Country: United States
- Language: Silent

A Woman's Way is a 1908 American silent short drama film directed by D. W. Griffith. It was filmed in Coytesville and Little Falls, New Jersey.

== Cast ==
- George Gebhardt as A Woodsman
- Harry Solter as A Camper
- Linda Arvidson as The Camper's Wife
- Dorothy Bernard
- Arthur V. Johnson as Man with Rifle
- Florence Lawrence
- Herbert Miles
- Mabel Trunnelle as The Woodsman's Daughter
