= Dorothy West (actress) =

American actress (1891–1980)

Dorothy West (August 29, 1891 – December 11, 1980) was an American stage and film actress, as well as a radio performer.

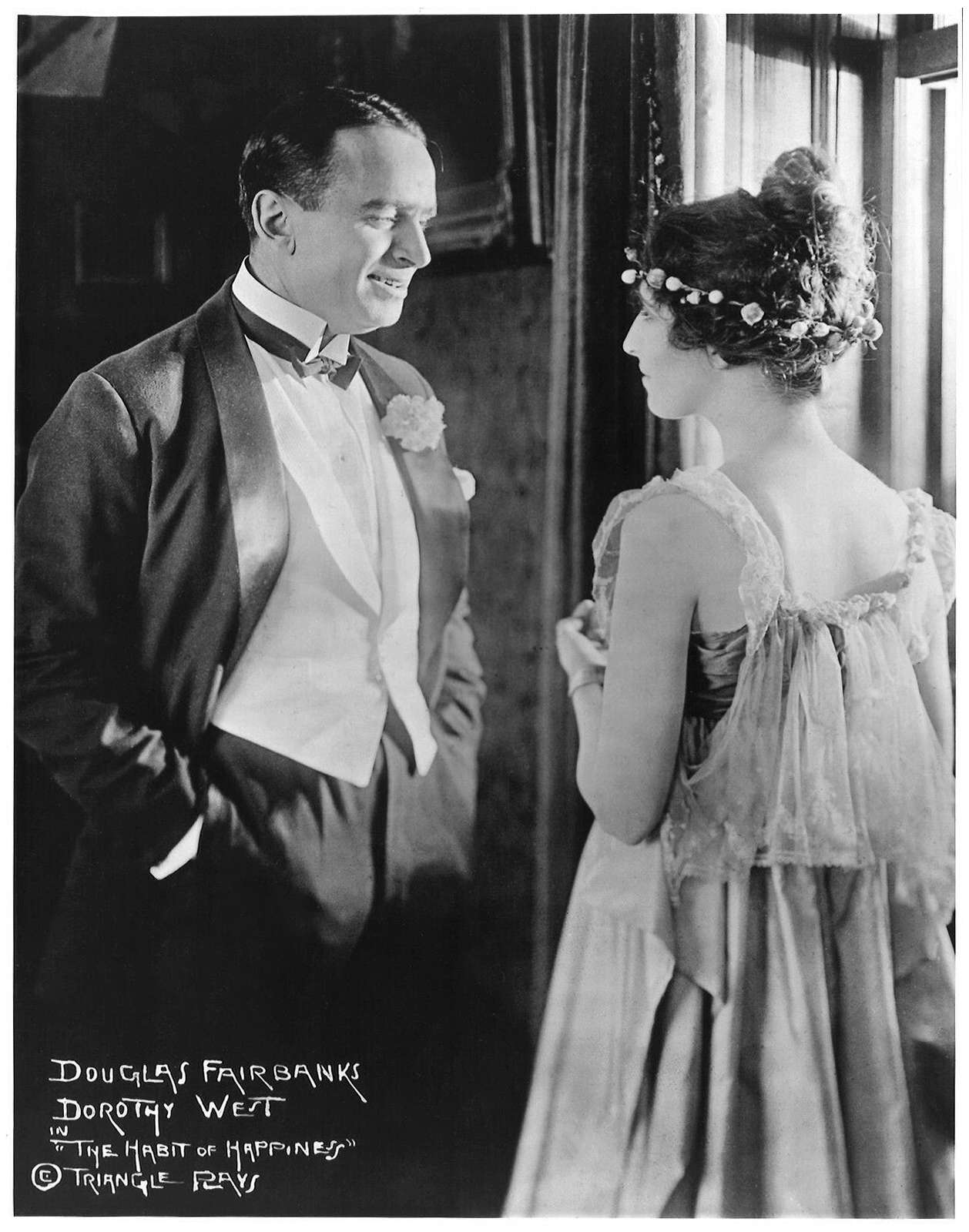
Douglas Fairbanks with West in The Habit of Happiness (1916)

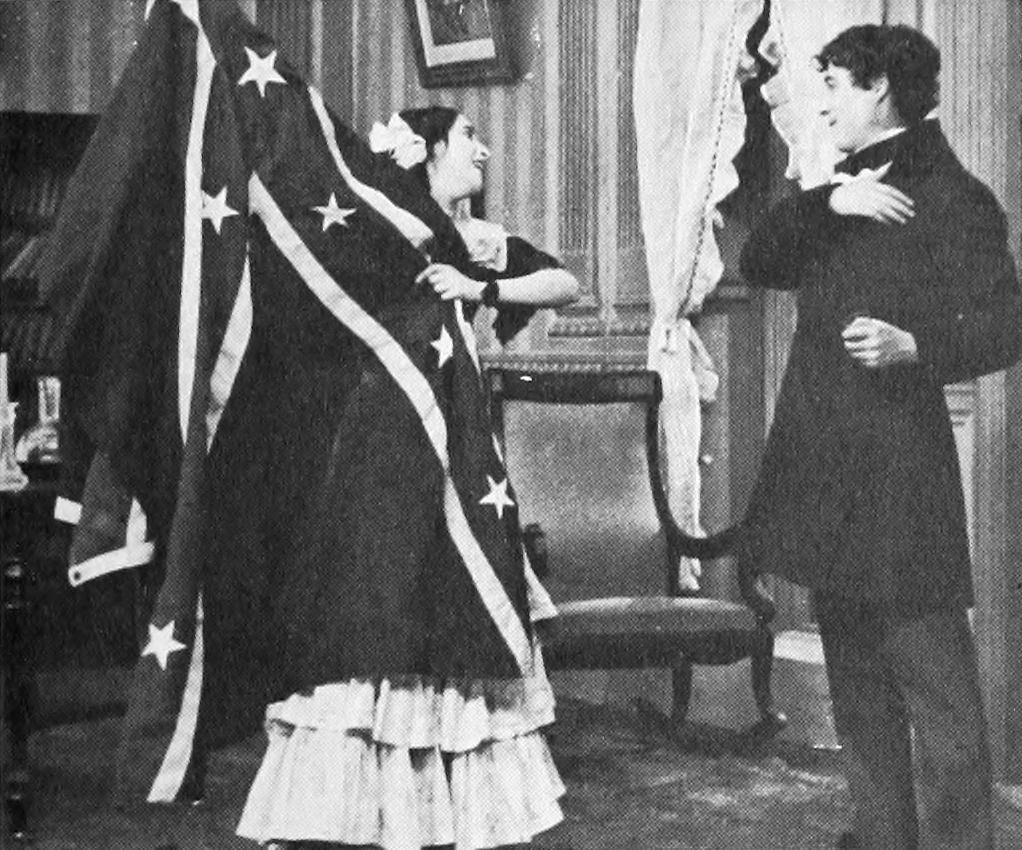
West and Henry B. Walthall in The House with Closed Shutters, a 1910 Civil War drama directed by D. W. Griffith

== Early life ==
Dorothy West grew up in Huntsville, Alabama.

== Career ==
West was a star in Biograph silent films in New York. She later relocated to Hollywood with a group of D. W. Griffith stars that included Mary Pickford, Marion Leonard, Florence Barker, and Mack Sennett in 1909. West, Pickford, Pickford's brother Jack, and Effie Johnson boarded together.

She joined a stock theatre company in Mount Vernon, Illinois then joined the Pitt Stock Players in Pittsburgh, Pennsylvania. She also performed in theatre in Halifax, Nova Scotia.

West returned to film several years later and received positive notice for her work in Griffith's His Mother's Scarf (1911) Swords and Hearts (1911) and The Eternal Grind (1916), then left films again to tour in theatre productions in Europe after World War I with the American Army of Occupation, including in Germany.

She also worked on Broadway and with a theatre company called The Triangle Players. She performed in the short play Sintram of Skaggerack by Sada Cowan in 1923.

She made her radio debut in 1928.

== Selected filmography ==
- The Girl and the Outlaw (1908)
- The Guerrilla (1908)
- An Awful Moment (1908)
- One Touch of Nature (1909)
- Love Finds a Way (1909)
- Those Boys! (1909)
- The Girls and Daddy (1909)
- The Brahma Diamond (1909)
- His Wife's Mother (1909)
- The Roue's Heart (1909)
- I Did It (1909)
- The Deception (1909)
- A Burglar's Mistake (1909)
- The Cord of Life (1909)
- The Day After (1909)
- The Unchanging Sea (1910)
- In the Border States (1910)
- The House with Closed Shutters (1910)
- Heart Beats of Long Ago (1911)
- His Mother's Scarf (1911)
- Swords and Hearts (1911)
- The Habit of Happiness (1916)
- The Eternal Grind (1916)
