= Linda Arvidson =

American actress (1884–1949)

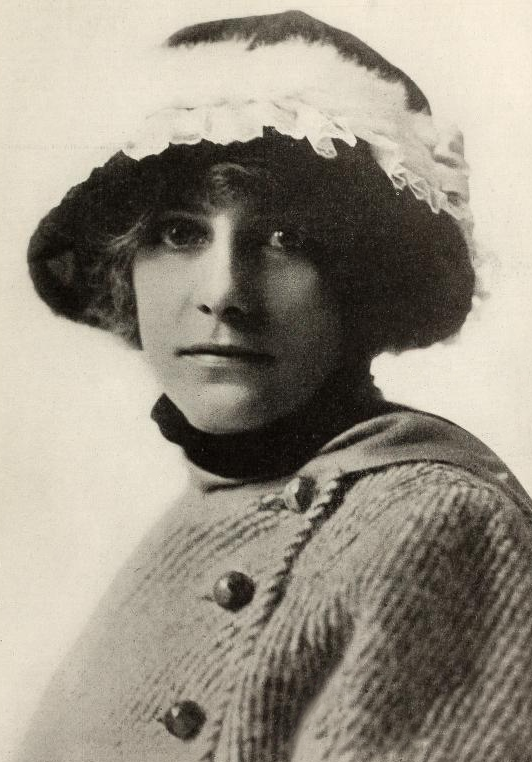
- Linda Griffith, from a 1913 publication
- Born: Linda Arvidson Johnson; July 12, 1884; San Francisco, California, U.S.
- Died: July 26, 1949 (aged 65); New York City, U.S.
- Other name: Linda Griffith
- Occupation: Actress
- Years active: 1907–1916
- Spouse: D. W. Griffith (m. 1906; div. 1936)

Linda Arvidson (born Linda Arvidson Johnson, July 12, 1884 – July 26, 1949; sometimes credited as Linda Griffith) was an American stage and film actress. She became one of America's early motion picture stars while working at Biograph Studios in New York, where none of the company's actors, until 1913, were credited on screen. Along with Florence Lawrence, Marion Leonard, and other female performers there, she was often referred to by theatergoers and in trade publications as simply one of the "Biograph girls". Arvidson began working in the new, rapidly expanding film industry after meeting her future husband D. W. Griffith, who impressed her as an innovative screen director. Their marriage was kept secret for reasons of professional discretion.

== Biography ==
The daughter of Swedish parents, Arvidson was the first wife of film director D. W. Griffith. She played lead roles in many of his early films.

In 1925, she wrote her autobiography When the Movies Were Young. She is mentioned in William J. Mann's The Biograph Girl, a novel based on Florence Lawrence.

On July 26, 1949, Arvidson died in New York City at age 65.

== Career ==
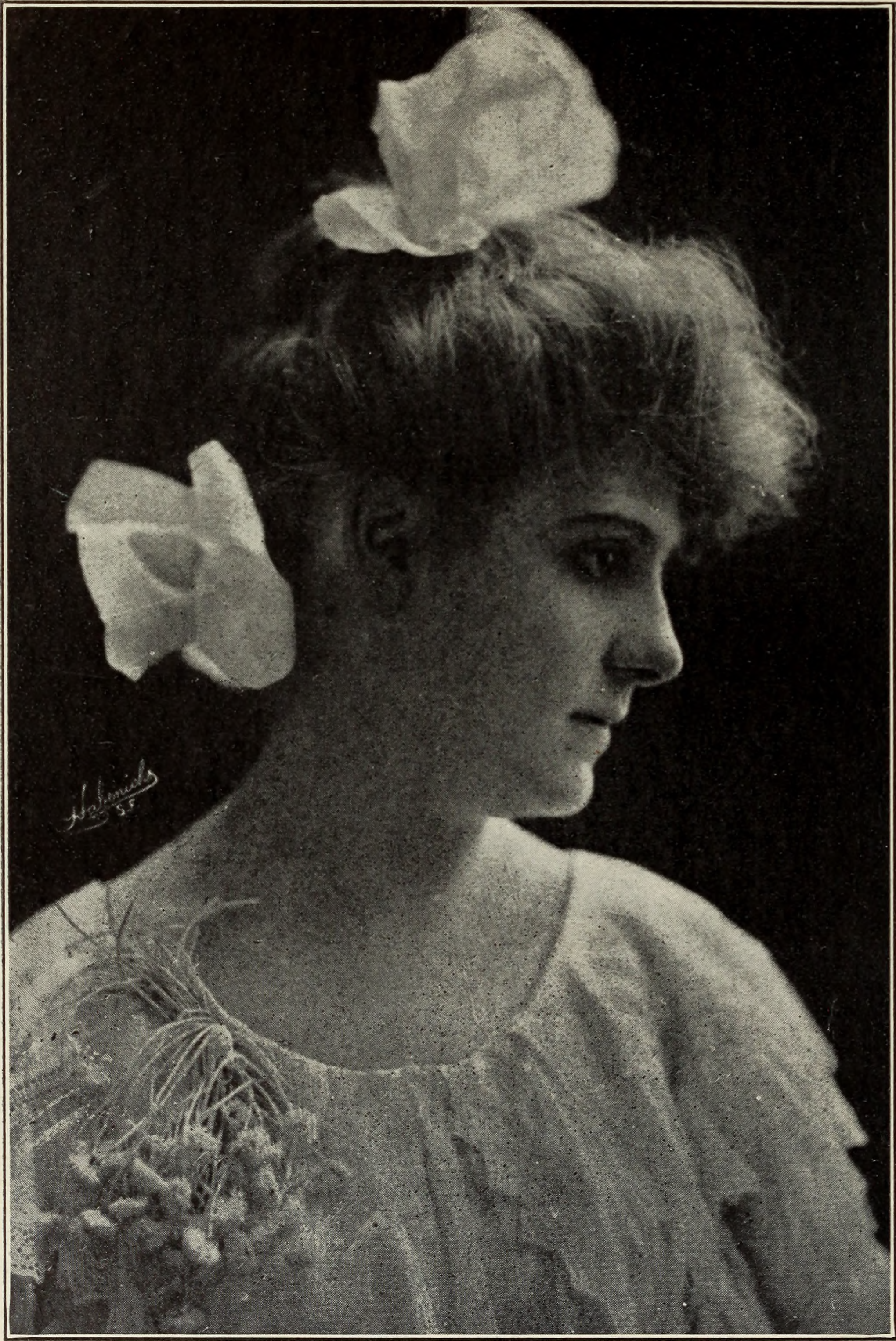
Arvidson as an ingénue in a play, c. 1904

Arvidson's first professional role was on stage at the Alcazar Theatre in San Francisco in a 1904 adaptation of The Christian by British novelist Hall Caine. In this production, she portrayed one of the fisher girls and earned a weekly wage of three dollars and 40 cents for her performances. One experience called up after another as Arvidson performed in a variety of recitals across San Francisco's great concert halls. She appeared as a servant boy in the play Fedora. It was on this production where she met David Wark Griffith, a supporting actor and her future husband, who at that time worked under the stage name Lawrence Griffith. Through the next few months in which Arvidson and Griffith were together, Arvidson spent time performing small roles in productions at the Burbank Theatre in Los Angeles and at the Orpheum.

=== Film career ===
In 1906, Arvidson and Griffith moved to New York, where they began rehearsals for playwright Rev. Thomas Dixon's play The Other Woman. As the two settled into the New York theatre scene, Griffith learned about the Biograph Company and the American Mutoscope and their work with moving pictures. Griffith encouraged Arvidson to introduce herself there. When Knights Were Bold, Arvidson's first picture at Biograph, was directed by Sidney Olcott and included Griffith in the cast as well, marking the couple's only appearance together on screen.

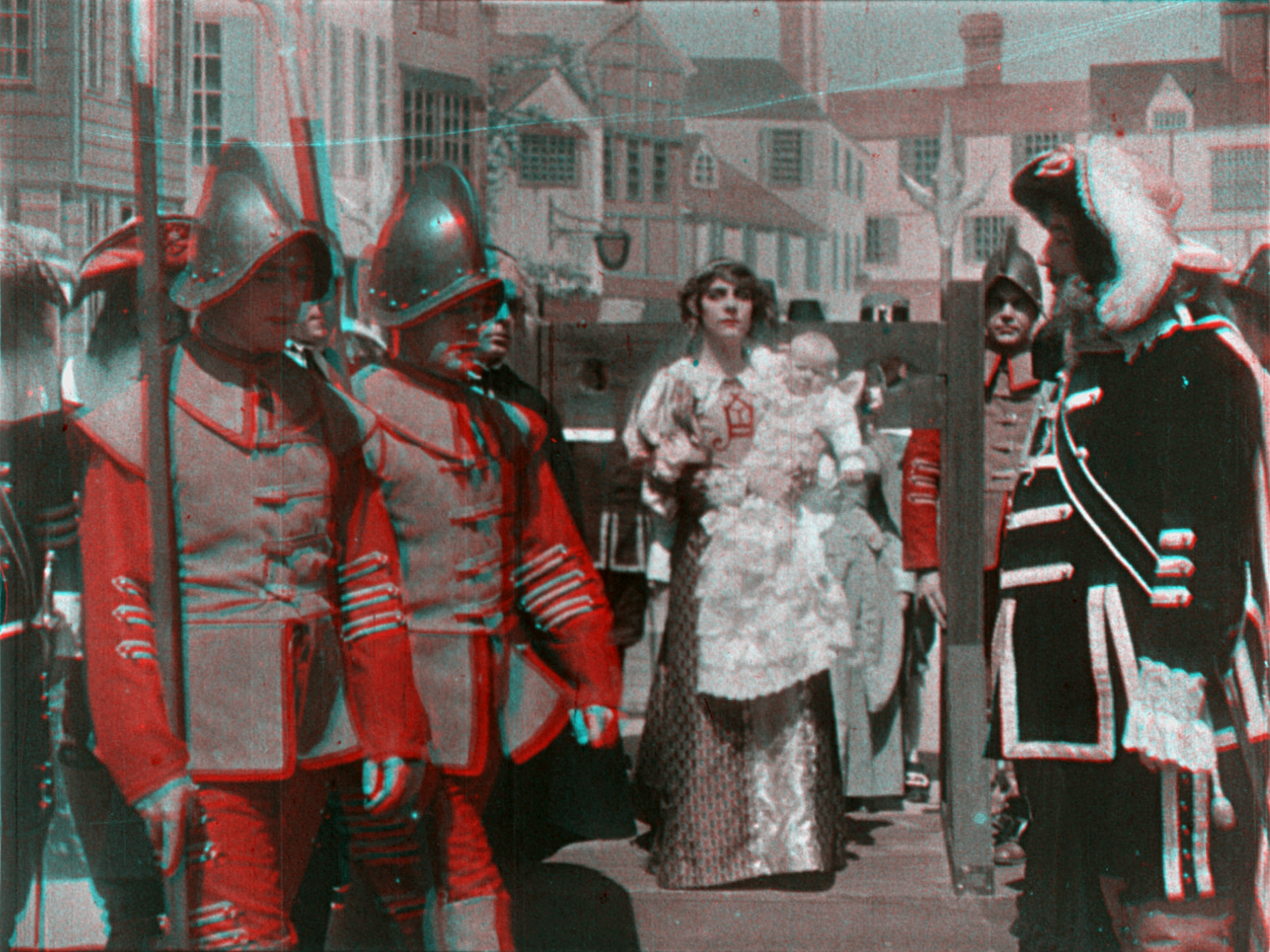
Kinemacolor frame of Linda Arvidson in The Scarlet Letter (1913).

In 1908, Griffith rose to directing The Adventures of Dollie, his first picture for Biograph, in which Arvidson played the leading female character. In her memoir, Arvidson described most of the characters she played in her early film career as "the sympathetic, the wronged wife, the too-trusting maid...waiting for the lover who never came back." At the time, the studio did not want the women in their films to be identified, so the leading women they featured like Arvidson, Mary Pickford, and Florence Lawrence were all known as the Biograph Girls. During their days on set, the women spent time getting ready with elaborate makeup for the camera while Griffith as a director would take only the men out to lunch. As more actors began to emerge into this new medium, the old timers like Arvidson had their salaries doubled, accumulating up to $10 per day. On October 4, 1909, Pippa Passes, Arvidson and Griffith's biggest picture at the time, was released. The film was the first of their productions to attract the attention of The New York Times and to receive a favorable review from this newspaper. Around 1912–1913, she worked for the Kinemacolor Company of America.

=== Writing career ===
Arvidson wrote screenplays, including the one for the five-reel Who's Guilty Now? She was an associate editor of Film Fun and a film critic for Leslie's Magazine, and she wrote the book When the Movies Were Young.

=== Relationship with D. W. Griffith ===
When meeting Griffith on the set of Fedora, Arvidson immediately was struck by his presence, his talent and booming voice. He too grew infatuated with her quickly; in Arvidson's memoir When the Movies Were Young, Arvidson recalls Griffith's encouragement: "Said I had wonderful eyes for the stage and if I ever went to New York and got it right, I'd get jobs 'on my eyes.'" Arvidson also mentions that Griffith advised her to never get married if she wanted to continue to have a career as an actress; an ironic sentiment because the two ended up marrying less than 2 years later.

At the time the San Francisco Earthquake occurred in 1906, Griffith was finding work in Boston, where Arvidson notified him by telegram about the disaster. Griffith's theatre company was booked for a six-week engagement in Boston, so he got Arvidson a railroad ticket to join him there. When Arvidson arrived, the two spontaneously rode to the Old North Church and wrote their names in the wedding registry, and then they moved to New York City.

In 1908, when Griffith encouraged Arvidson to test her talent on camera, Arvidson recalled in her memoir that he told her not to mention that she was his wife because it is "'better business not to.'" As they grew more experienced with acting on camera and more in tune with the people at Biograph, Griffith still wanted to leave for a summer and do a summer stock theatre show, yet Arvidson convinced him to stay and continue his relationship with the company. Arvidson served as the leading person who supported Griffith's success in his budding film career, first as an actor, then writer, then director. Griffith wondered about the stories that would unfold if public spectators witnessed them together and how that would affect the work they created together. As of 1909, those at Biograph were unaware of Arvidson and Griffith's marriage. The two kept their relationship confidential because personal and business matters were not known to intermingle and was deemed "unprofessional." The couple separated around 1912, and finally divorced on March 2, 1936, when Griffith wished to remarry.

== Partial filmography ==
- The Adventures of Dollie (1908)
- The Bandit's Waterloo (1908)
- The Helping Hand (1908)
- Balked at the Altar (1908)
- After Many Years (1908)
- The Taming of the Shrew (1908)
- A Calamitous Elopement (1908)
- The Greaser's Gauntlet (1908)
- The Man and the Woman (1908)
- The Fatal Hour (1908)
- For a Wife's Honor (1908)
- Betrayed by a Handprint (1908)
- The Red Girl (1908)
- Where the Breakers Roar (1908)
- A Smoked Husband (1908)
- The Stolen Jewels (1908)
- Father Gets in the Game (1908)
- Ingomar, the Barbarian (1908)
- The Vaquero's Vow (1908)
- The Planter's Wife (1908)
- Concealing a Burglar (1908)
- The Pirate's Gold (1908)
- The Song of the Shirt (1908)
- A Woman's Way (1908)
- The Clubman and the Tramp (1908)
- The Feud and the Turkey (1908)
- The Test of Friendship (1908)
- An Awful Moment (1908)
- The Helping Hand (1908)
- One Touch of Nature (1909)
- Mrs. Jones Entertains (1909)
- Love Finds a Way (1909)
- The Sacrifice (1909)
- A Rural Elopement (1909)
- Those Boys! (1909)
- The Criminal Hypnotist (1909)
- The Fascinating Mrs. Francis (1909)
- Mr. Jones Has a Card Party (1909)
- Those Awful Hats (1909)
- The Welcome Burglar (1909)
- The Cord of Life (1909)
- Edgar Allen Poe (1909)
- A Wreath in Time (1909)
- Tragic Love (1909)
- The Golden Louis (1909)
- A Corner in Wheat (1909)
- At the Altar (1909)
- The Medicine Bottle (1909)
- A Drunkard's Reformation (1909)
- Resurrection (1909)
- The Hessian Renegades (1909)
- The Death Disc: A Story of the Cromwellian Period (1909)
- To Save Her Soul (1909)
- The Day After (1909)
- His Wife's Mother (1909)
- The Roue's Heart (1909)
- I Did It (1909)
- The Deception (1909)
- Pippa Passes (1909)
- Comata, the Sioux (1909)
- The Rocky Road (1910)
- The Woman from Mellon's (1910)
- The Two Brothers (1910)
- The Unchanging Sea (1910)
- The Lucky Toothache (1910)
- His Trust (1911)
- His Trust Fulfilled (1911)
- Fisher Folks (1911)
- His Daughter (1911)
- How She Triumphed (1911 – writer)
- Enoch Arden (1911)
- The Miser's Heart (1911)

== Bibliography ==
- Finler, Joel W. The Hollywood Story. Wallflower Press, 2003. ISBN 1903364663
- Griffith, Linda Arvidson. When the Movies Were Young. Dover Publications (1925, reprinted in 1969). ISBN 0-486-22300-0
- Menefee, David W. The First Female Stars: Women of the Silent Era. Praeger Publishers, 2004. ISBN 0275982599
- Wexman, Virginia Wright. Creating the Couple: Love, Marriage, and Hollywood Performance. Princeton University Press, 1993. ISBN 0691069697
