= J. K. Tillotson =

American dramatist

James Knox Tillotson (April 16, 1845 – October 23, 1907) was an American playwright and businessman. His plays included The Planter's Wife, Queena, Lynwood and A Young Wife.

The Planter's Wife, written for Charlotte Thompson, appeared in Chicago by early 1883, and ran on Broadway by April of the same year, and played far and wide over the ensuing decade as one of the most popular "spectacular plantation dramas" of the day.

Tillotson's A Gilded Crime was performed to great acclaim at the Elitch Theatre in 1896. "A Gilded Crime seemed to please the audiences greatly."

His daughter was the American operatic soprano Queena Mario. At various times he lived in Ohio and New Jersey.
