= Bottling line =

Production line for filling bottles

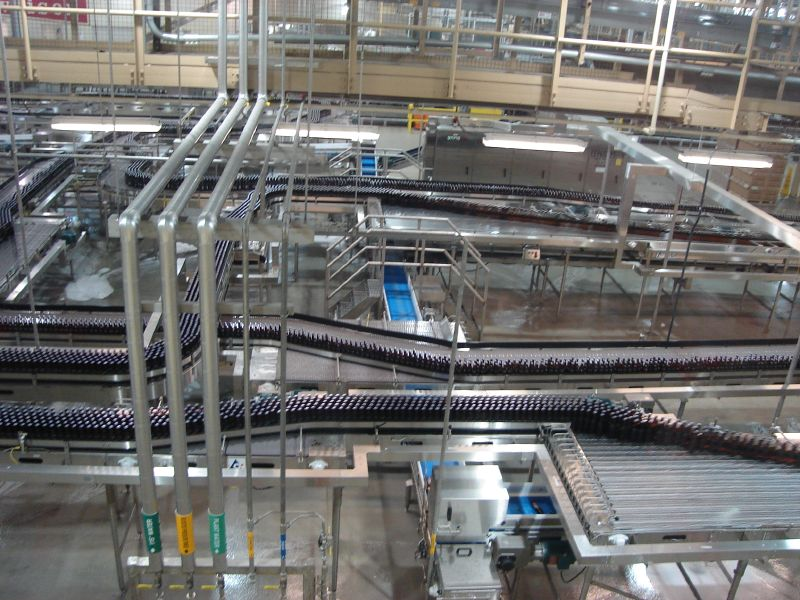
A modern beer bottling line

Bottling lines are production lines that fill a liquid product, often a beverage, into bottles on a large scale. Many prepared foods are also bottled, such as sauces, syrups, marinades, oils and vinegars.

Bottling lines usually include label application equipment, capping operations, date stamps, etc. Quality assurance verification equipment is often included.

== Beer bottling process ==
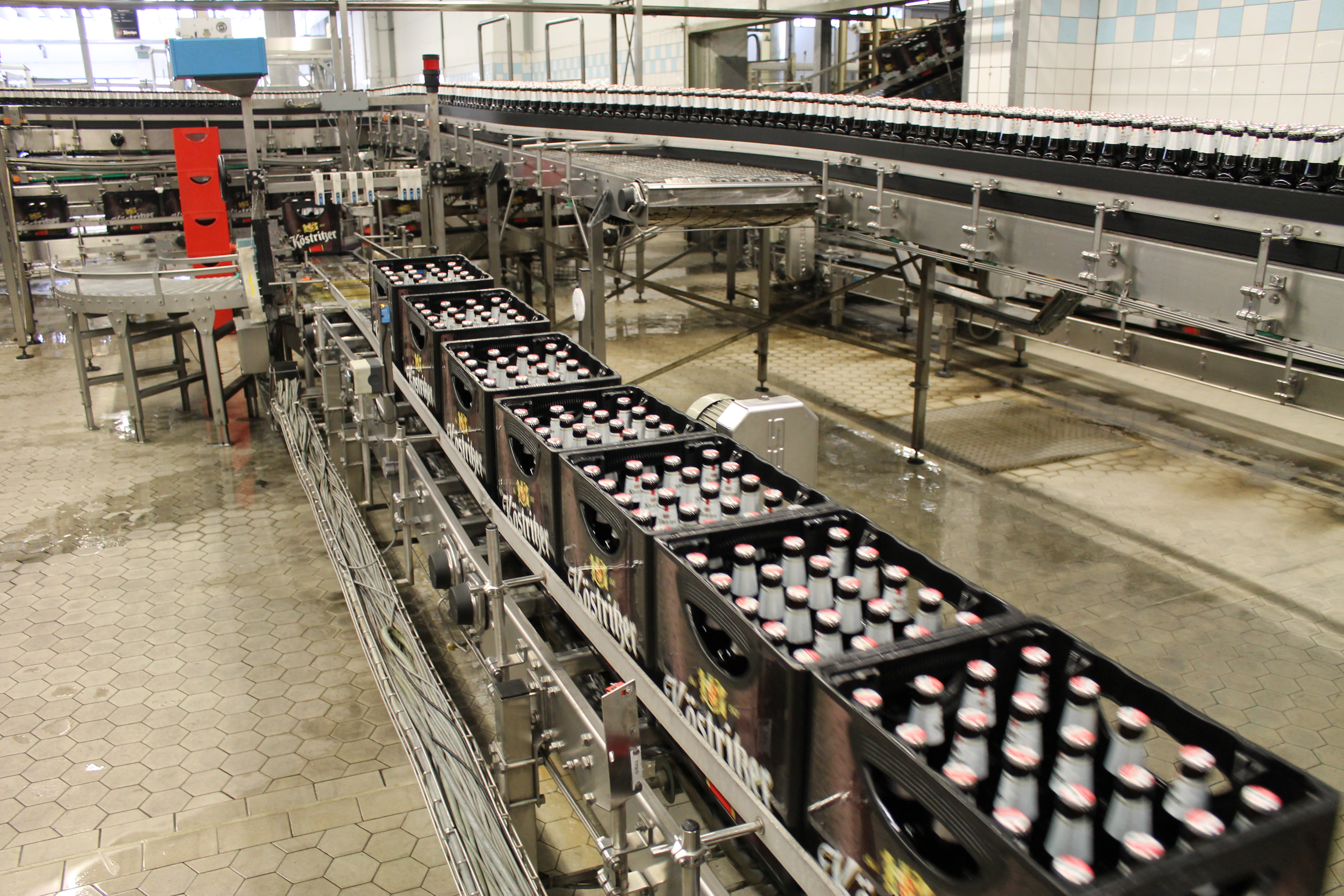
A bottling line for Schwarzbier at Köstritzer in Bad Köstritz, Thuringia, Germany

Packaging of bottled beer typically involves drawing the product from a holding tank and filling it into bottles in a filling machine (filler), which are then capped, labeled and packed into cases or cartons. Many smaller breweries send their bulk beer to large facilities for contract bottling—though some will bottle by hand. Virtually all beer bottles are glass.

The first step in bottling beer is depalletising, where the empty bottles are removed from the original pallet packaging delivered from the manufacturer, so that individual bottles may be handled. The bottles may then be rinsed with filtered water or air, and may have carbon dioxide injected into them in attempt to reduce the level of oxygen within the bottle. The bottle then enters a "filler" which fills the bottle with beer and may also inject a small amount of inert gas (usually carbon dioxide or nitrogen) on top of the beer to disperse the oxygen, as oxygen can ruin the quality of the product via oxidation. Finally, the bottles go through a "capper", which applies a bottle cap, sealing the bottle. A few beers are bottled with a cork and cage.

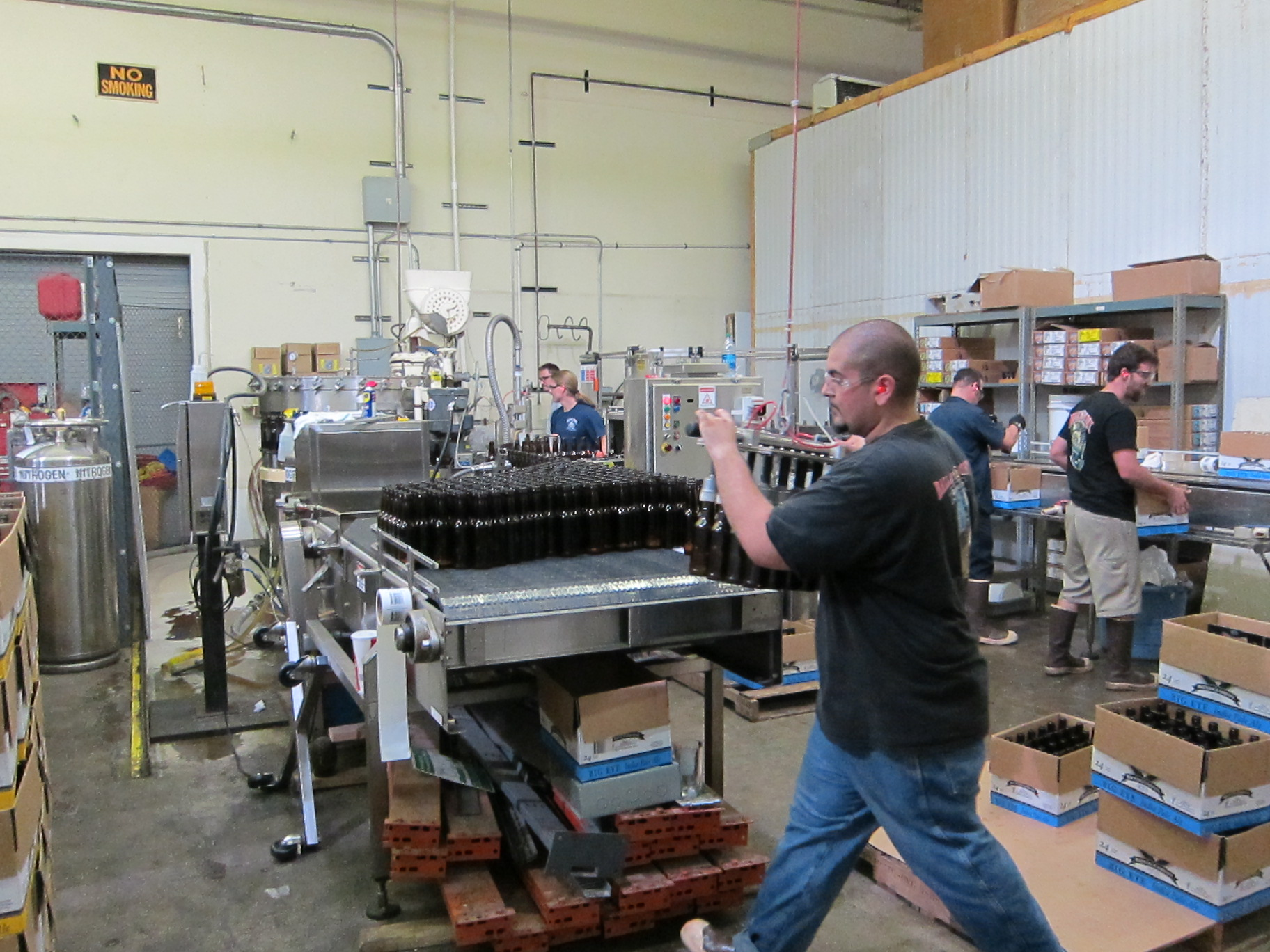
Smaller scale bottling line at Ballast Point Brewing

Next the bottle enters a labelling machine ("labeller") where a label is applied. To ensure traceability of the product, a lot number, generally the date and time of bottling, may also be printed on the bottle. The product is then packed into boxes and warehoused, ready for sale.

Depending on the magnitude of the bottling endeavor, there are many different types of bottling machinery available. Liquid level machines fill bottles so they appear to be filled to the same line on every bottle, while volumetric filling machines fill each bottle with exactly the same amount of liquid. Overflow pressure fillers are the most popular machines with beverage makers, while gravity filling machines are most cost effective. In terms of automation, inline filling machines are most popular, but rotary machines are much faster albeit much more expensive.

== Wine bottling process ==
The process for bottling wine is largely similar to that for bottling beer, except wine bottles differ in volumes and shapes. Traditionally, a cork is used to provide closure to wine bottles. After filling, a bottle travels to a corking machine (corker) where a cork is compressed and pushed into the neck of the bottle. Whilst this is happening, the corker vacuums the air out of the bottle to form a negative pressure headspace. This removes any oxygen from the headspace, which is useful as latent oxygen can ruin the quality of the product via oxidation. A negative pressure headspace will also counteract pressure caused by the thermal expansion of the wine, preventing the cork from being forced from the bottle. Champagnes and sparkling wines may further be sealed with a muselet, which ensures the cork will not explode off in transit. Alternative wine closures such as screw caps are available.

Some bottling lines incorporate a fill height detector which rejects under or over-filled bottles, and also a metal detector.

After filling and corking, a plastic or tin capsule is applied to the neck of the bottle in a capsular. Next the bottle enters a labeller where a wine label is applied. The product is then packed into boxes and warehoused, ready for sale.

== See also ==
- Beverage can
- Packaging and labeling
