= Screw cap (wine) =

Cap for wine bottles

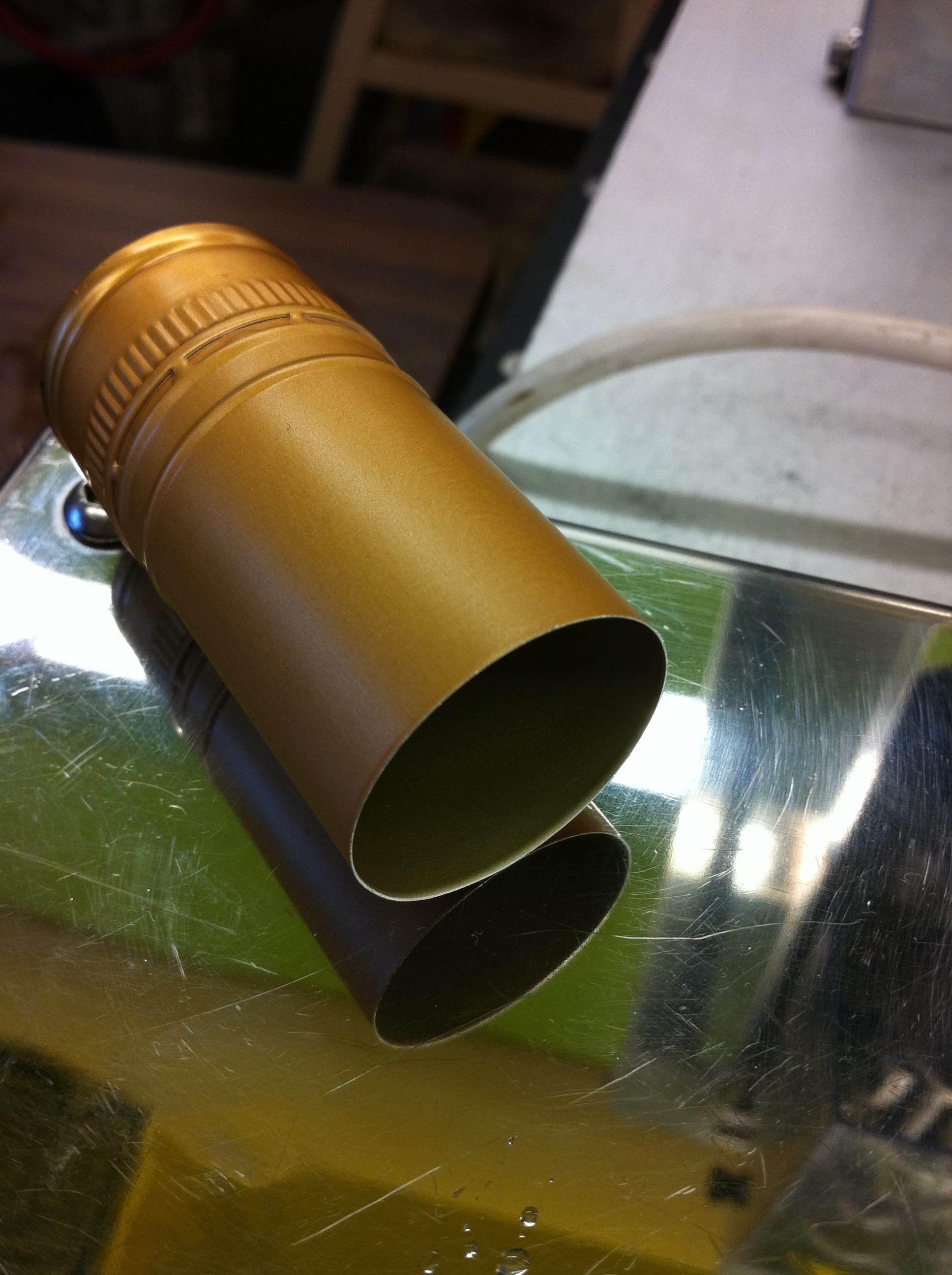
A screw cap capsule ready to be fitted onto a wine bottle

A screw cap is a metal, normally aluminium, cap that screws onto threads on the neck of a wine bottle, generally with a metal skirt down the neck to resemble the traditional wine capsule ("foil"). A layer of plastic (often PVDC), cork, rubber, or other soft material is used as wad to make a seal with the mouth of the bottle. Its use as an alternative to cork for sealing wine bottles is gaining increasing support. In markets such as Australia and New Zealand screw caps on bottles have overtaken cork to become the most common means of sealing bottles.

== Benefits and concerns ==
Compared to cork, screw caps reduce the wine faults of oxidation and of cork taint, although it is possible to find TCA contamination in a screw cap bottle. Screw caps are generally perceived as easier to open and they are much easier to reseal. Screw caps have a much lower failure rate than cork, and in theory will allow a wine to reach the customer in perfect condition, with a minimum of bottle variation. However, cork has a centuries-old tradition behind it, and there are also concerns about the impact of screw caps on the aging of those few wines that require decades to be at their best. Some argue that the slow ingress of oxygen plays a vital role in aging a wine, while others argue that this amount is almost zero in a sound cork and that any admitted oxygen is harmful.

Producers in Champagne have aged their wines under crown cap for quite some time; however, the crown cap is replaced by the traditional cork at the end of the second fermentation.

The converse of oxidation is reduction, and it has been suggested that screwcapped wine leads to increased reduced characters if the underlying chemistry of the wine is reductive. These include a sulfide smell which in some circumstances adds a pleasant pungency to the wine, or may be distasteful.

== Stelvin screw caps ==
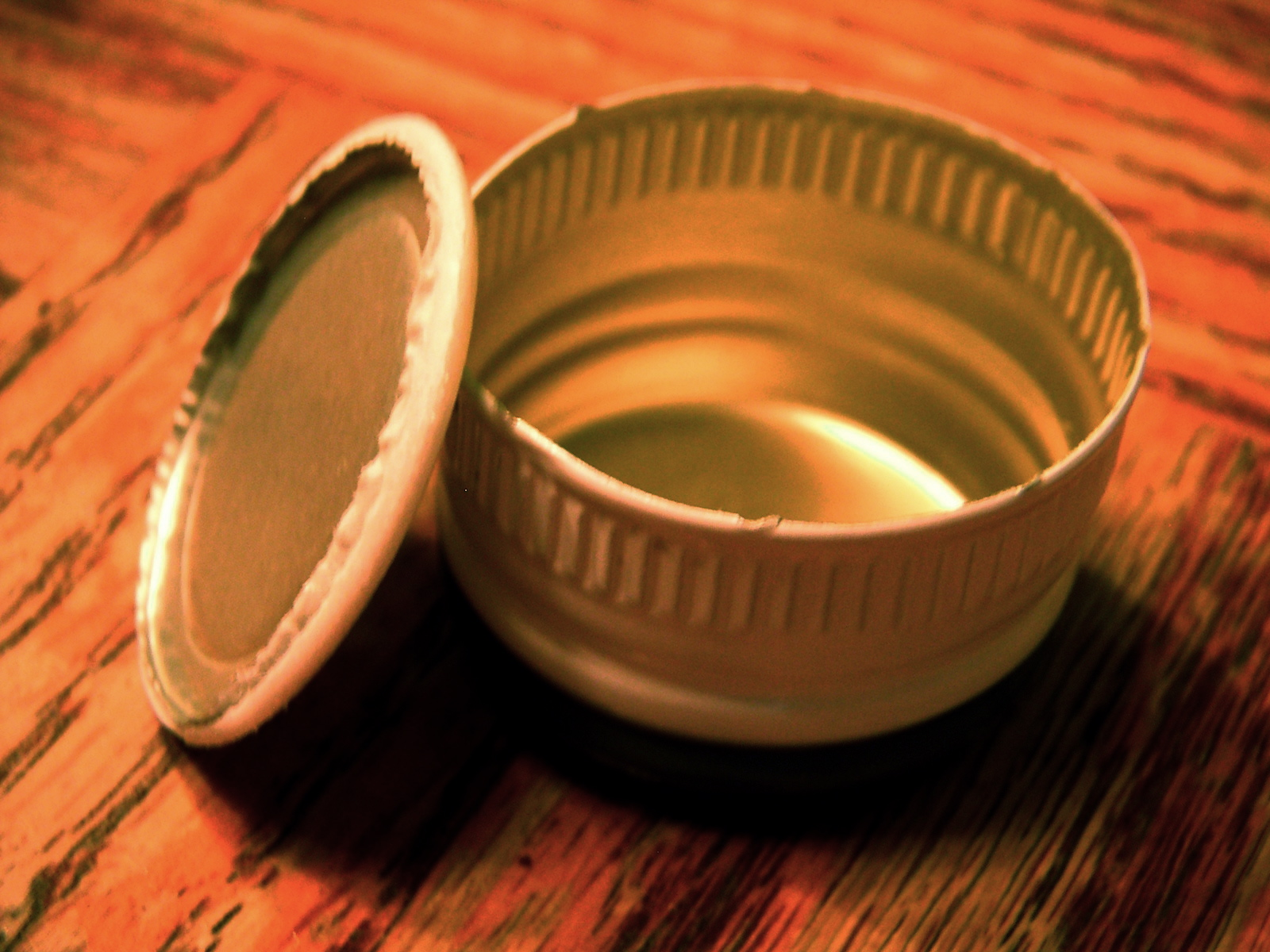
The two parts of a Stelvin-brand screwcap

The best known brand of wine screw caps is Stelvin. The caps have a long outside skirt, intended to resemble the traditional wine capsule ("foil"), and use plastic PVDC (polyvinylidene chloride) as a neutral liner on the inside wadding.

The Stelvin was developed in the late 1960s and early 1970s by a French company Le Bouchage Mécanique at the behest of Peter Wall, the then Production Director of the Australian Yalumba winery. In 1964 Peter Wall approached Le Bouchage Mécanique. The Stelvin cap was trialled in 1970 and 1971 with the Swiss wine Chasselas, which was particularly affected by cork taint, and was first used commercially in 1972 by the Swiss winery Hammel. From about 1973 Yalumba and a group of other wineries – Hardys, McWilliams, Penfolds, Seppelt, Brown Bros and Tahbilk – were involved in developing and proving up the concept and began using it commercially in 1976.

Le Bouchage Mécanique was later acquired by Pea-Pechiney, which became part of Alcan, then Rio Tinto Alcan and now Amcor. The brand was developed by Rio Tinto Alcan. It was trademarked in 1975.

It was preceded as a closure by a Stelcap/cork combination (closed with cork, with a Stelcap on top): the Stelcap was also a long-skirted screw cap, but with a different inner lining (paper over cork, instead of PVDC or PVDC covered by foil-covered paper in a Stelvin).

In 2005, a modified Stelvin cap, Stelvin Lux, was introduced. Like the standard Stelvin cap, the outer shell is aluminium, but there is no externally visible screw thread or knurling, giving the closure a cleaner look more like a traditional foil capsule. Internally, there is a pre-formed thread, and the sealing materials are the same as the standard Stelvin cap.

== Adoption ==
In the UK, acceptance by consumers more than doubled, from 41% in 2003 to 85% in 2011.

Screw caps were widely adopted in the 1980s by Swiss winemakers, and have shown increasingly wide adoption in the succeeding years.

Screw caps met with customer resistance in Australia and New Zealand, and were phased out in the early 1980s, only to be reintroduced gradually in the 1990s to capitalise on the emerging Chinese market. Since reintroduction, ever-increasing numbers of winemakers are using the screw cap within Australia and New Zealand. In New Zealand, adoption went from 1% in 2001 to 70% in 2004. Screw cap adoption in fine wines in Australia has proceeded in fits and starts. In July 2000, a group of Clare Valley Riesling producers, led by Jeffrey Grosset bottled a portion of their wines in screw cap, and earlier that year PlumpJack Winery announced it would bottle half its production of US$130 1997 Reserve Cabernet Sauvignon in screwcap. Other announcements have followed, including one from Bonny Doon Vineyard in July 2002 that 80,000 cases of its "Big House" red and white wine would be bottled under screwcaps – followed by almost all the rest of its production by late 2004 (200,000 cases total).

Domaine Laroche in Chablis, France, has been bottling its Chablis, Premier Cru and Grand Cru under screw caps since 2001 vintage.

In July 2004 Corbett Canyon became the first US million plus case brand to switch to screw caps for its entire production, shipping just over three million cases a year.

Some appellations ban the use of screw caps, including (as of June 2013) Valpolicella Classico. In 2008, the ban led Italian producer Allegrini to withdraw from the Valpolicella Classico denomination in order to use a screw cap.

== See also ==
- Closure (wine bottle)
- Alternative wine closures
- Stopper (plug)
- Screw cap
