= Domaine Laroche =

Coordinates: 47.8162°N 3.8003°E

Domaine Laroche is a family business winery in the Chablis AOC. The vineyards of Domaine Laroche are spread across Chablis, and are currently undergoing conversion to organic viticulture. Grégory Viennois, a graduate of the University of Burgundy, is the winemaker. Chablis AOC wines are produced exclusively from the Chardonnay grape. Domaine Laroche decided to bottle its offering under screw caps to keep wines fresh and prevent cork taint, but later switched back to using corks.

== Wine criticism ==
Domaine Laroche Les Vaudevey Premier Cru Chablis 2015 was rated 93 points by Wine & Spirits.

Jeannie Cho Lee rated the 2013 Domaine Laroche Chablis at 80 points, calling it a "Simple Chablis without much depth."

== See also ==
- List of Chablis crus
- Burgundy wine
