= Nomacorc =

Nomacorc now known as Vinventions, is a company producing engineered synthetic corks for wine bottles. Nomacorc closures are co-extruded to manage the oxygen transfer rate for wine, reducing 2,4,6-trichloroanisole (TCA), more commonly known as cork taint.

== History ==
In 1999, Belgian businessman Gert Noël and his son, Marc Noël, introduced the first Nomacorc closure.

The company is headquartered in Zebulon, North Carolina. In 2001, Nomacorc expanded into the European market with the addition of operations in Eupen, Belgium. In 2003, Nomacorc changed its European headquarters to Thimister-Clermont, Belgium. In January 2008, the company opened a production facility in Yantai, Shandong, China. Nomacorc has plants on three continents that produce 2 billion corks per year.

== Research ==
In December 2008, Nomacorc announced the initiation of multiyear projects with the Geisenheim Wine Research Center, the UC Davis Department of Viticulture and Enology, the Institut National de la Recherche Agronomique (INRA), and the Australian Wine Research Institute (AWRI).

The studies focus on how oxygen transfer influences the wine after bottling. The studies were set for completion in December 2011.

== Leadership ==
- Marc Noël, Founder
- Lars von Kantzow, CEO
