= Scalphunter =

Scalphunter may refer to:

- Scalphunter (DC Comics), a DC Comics hero of the Wild West
- Greycrow, a Marvel Comics character formerly known as Scalphunter
- The Scalphunters, a 1968 American Western film

== See also ==
- Scalp (disambiguation)
- Scalping (disambiguation)
