= Wine cork =

Stopper used to seal wine bottles

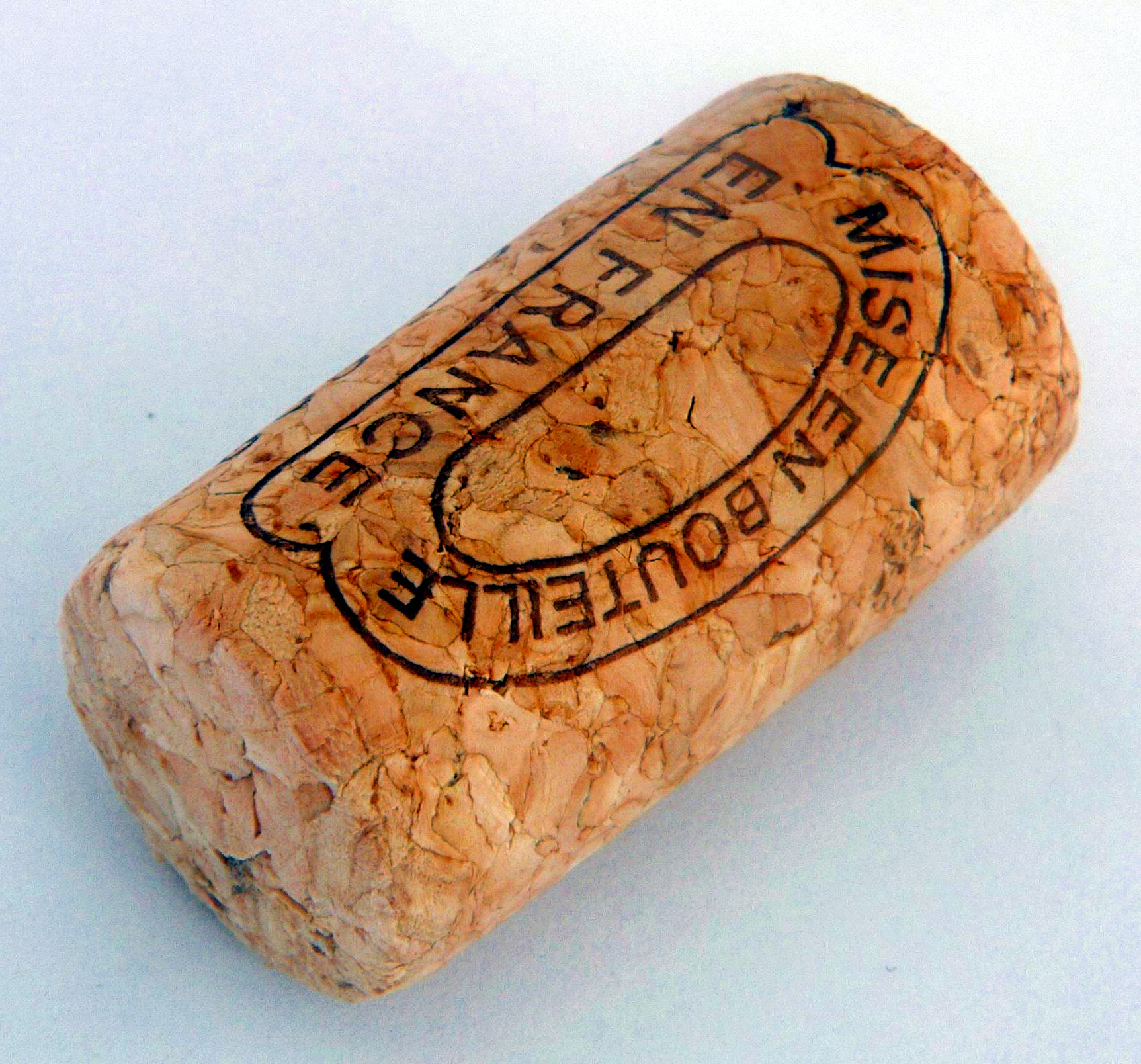
A French wine cork

A wine cork is a stopper used to seal a wine bottle. It is typically made from cork, the bark of the cork oak, though alternative wine closures such as screw caps and synthetic corks are also used. As of a 2015 publication, 68 percent of all cork was produced for wine bottle stoppers.

Corks are manufactured for still and sparkling wines; the latter are bottled under pressure, forcing the corks to take on a mushroom shape. They are fastened with a wire cage known as a muselet, reinforced with a metal cap and twisted tight for security. On champagne bottles, the muselet is often covered with metallic foil.

== History ==
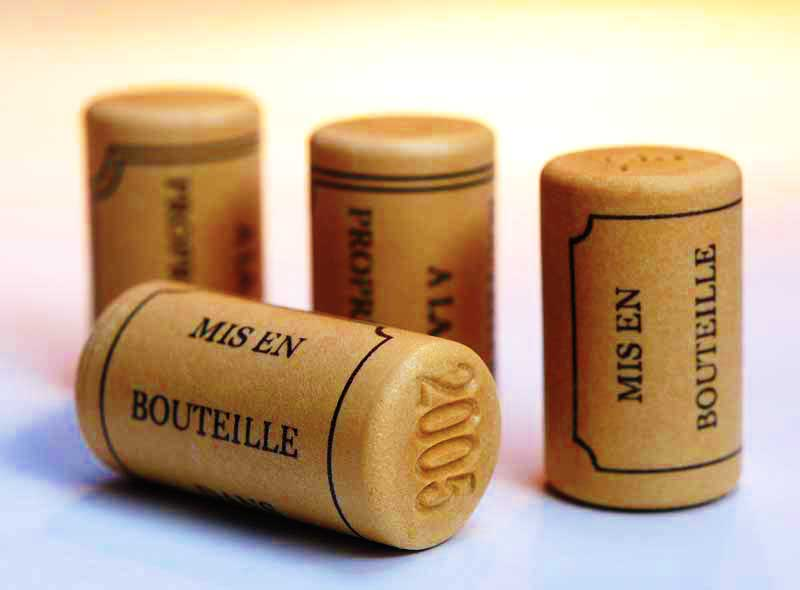
Synthetic corks

Cork has been used to seal bottles and vessels for 5 millennia. Ancient Egypt, Greece, and Rome, all used cork stopper.

As late as the mid-17th century, French vintners used oil-soaked rags stuffed into the necks of bottles instead of corks.

The first machines for manufacturing cork wine corks appeared in the United Kingdom, in the 19th century.

In the early 21st century, the problem of "cork taint", caused by the release of trichloroanisole resulting from the interaction between fungi present in the environment and compounds used in the manufacture of wine corks, became increasingly prevalent, leading many producers to opt for synthetic alternatives. Screw caps became especially prominent in Australia and New Zealand by 2010. Most cork was sourced from around the Mediterranean Basin, far from the Oceanian countries.

Following issues with cork taint, the cork industry invested in new techniques and equipment, reducing TCA chemicals in wine by 95 percent. Cork producers began promoting the cork's environmental and economic benefits.

== Production ==
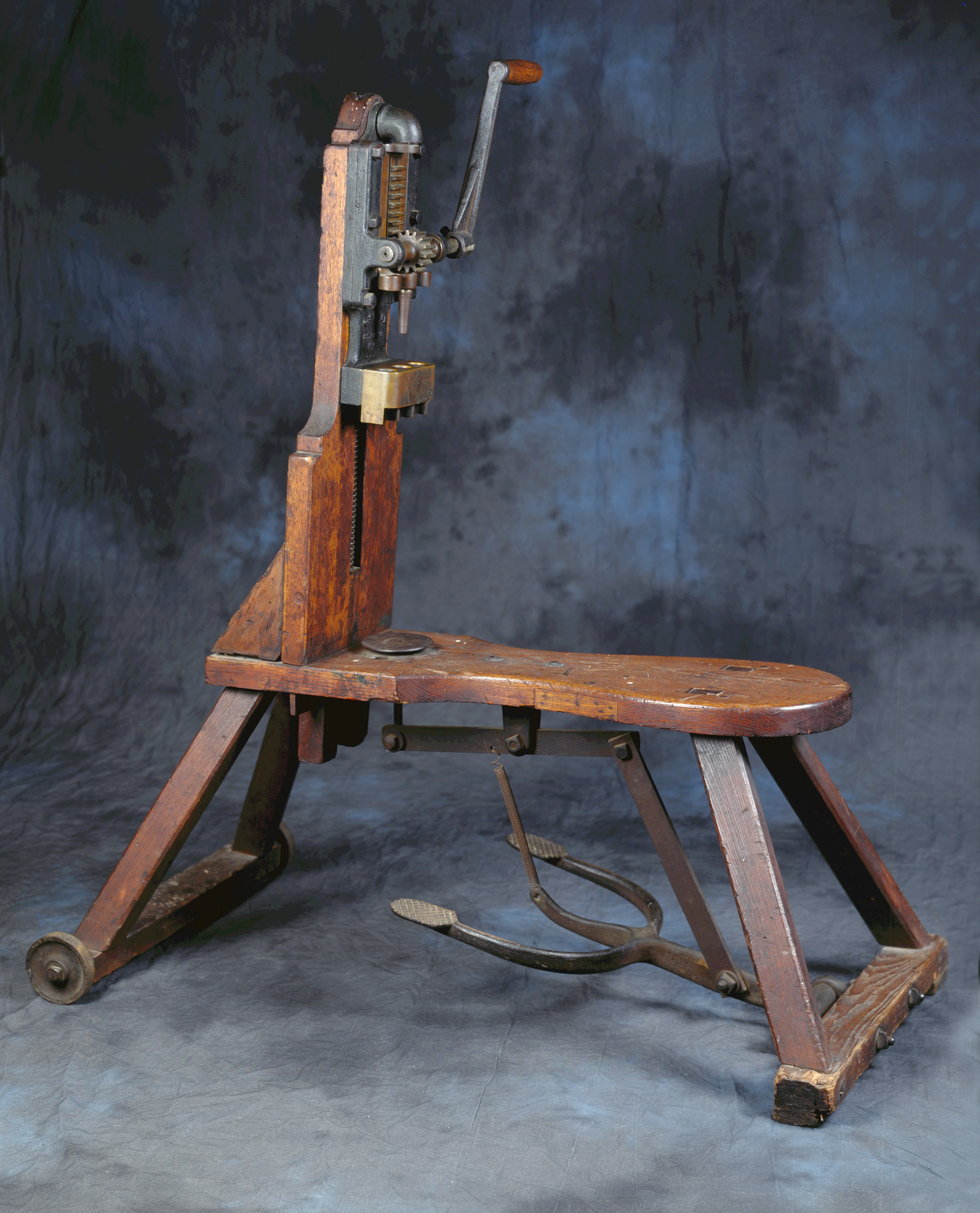
Manual corking machine, manufactured c. 1870

Like other cork products, natural wine corks are derived from the bark of cork oak trees. The bark is carefully peeled away and cut into sheets before processing. The oak trees are not cut down, and only about half of its bark is removed at any time. Cork oaks are first harvested at 25 years old, and take place every 9 years. After the third harvest, the bark is of sufficient quality for producing wine corks.

Portugal is the largest producer of corks, at 52.5 percent, followed by Spain, Italy, and Algeria. The majority of Portugal's production is in the region of Alentejo, at 72 percent of national production. 68 percent of all cork is produced for wine bottle stoppers.

=== Products ===
Corks can be made in several ways:

- Natural cork stoppers are made from a single piece of bark, and have the best flexibility, keeping the seal strong for aging wine for over 5 years.
- Colmated corks are made from a single piece of bark, but have pores filled with glue and cork dust. They are easier to remove from a bottle, and are good for medium aging.
- Multi-piece corks have two or more pieces glued together. They are denser than single-piece corks, and are not good for prolonged aging.
- Agglomerated corks are made of cork dust and glue, and are dense, inexpensive, and not good for sealing wine for over a year.
- Technical corks are agglomerated corks with single pieces of cork on either end.

== Quality parameters ==
Cork used for wine usually has a density between 160 kg/m3 and 220 kg/m3, although higher and lower densities are found.

Moisture in wine corks should be between 4% and 9% in order to balance desired elasticity against the risk of microbial development.

Surface treatments may be used to waterproof and/or lubricate wine corks. Paraffin waterproofs the surface, in addition to providing a certain degree of lubrication. Silicone is used for lubrication. The type of treatment to be applied and its dosage depend on the type of wine, the type of bottle, ageing time, and the type of bottling machine. For example, for wines requiring bottle ageing longer than 18 months, paraffin should be followed by silicone.

Wine cork extraction force tends to decrease over time. The recommended values lie between 20 and 40 kg in the first 24 hours after bottling, although the specific legal requirements may vary depending on the product's destination market.

== Attributes ==
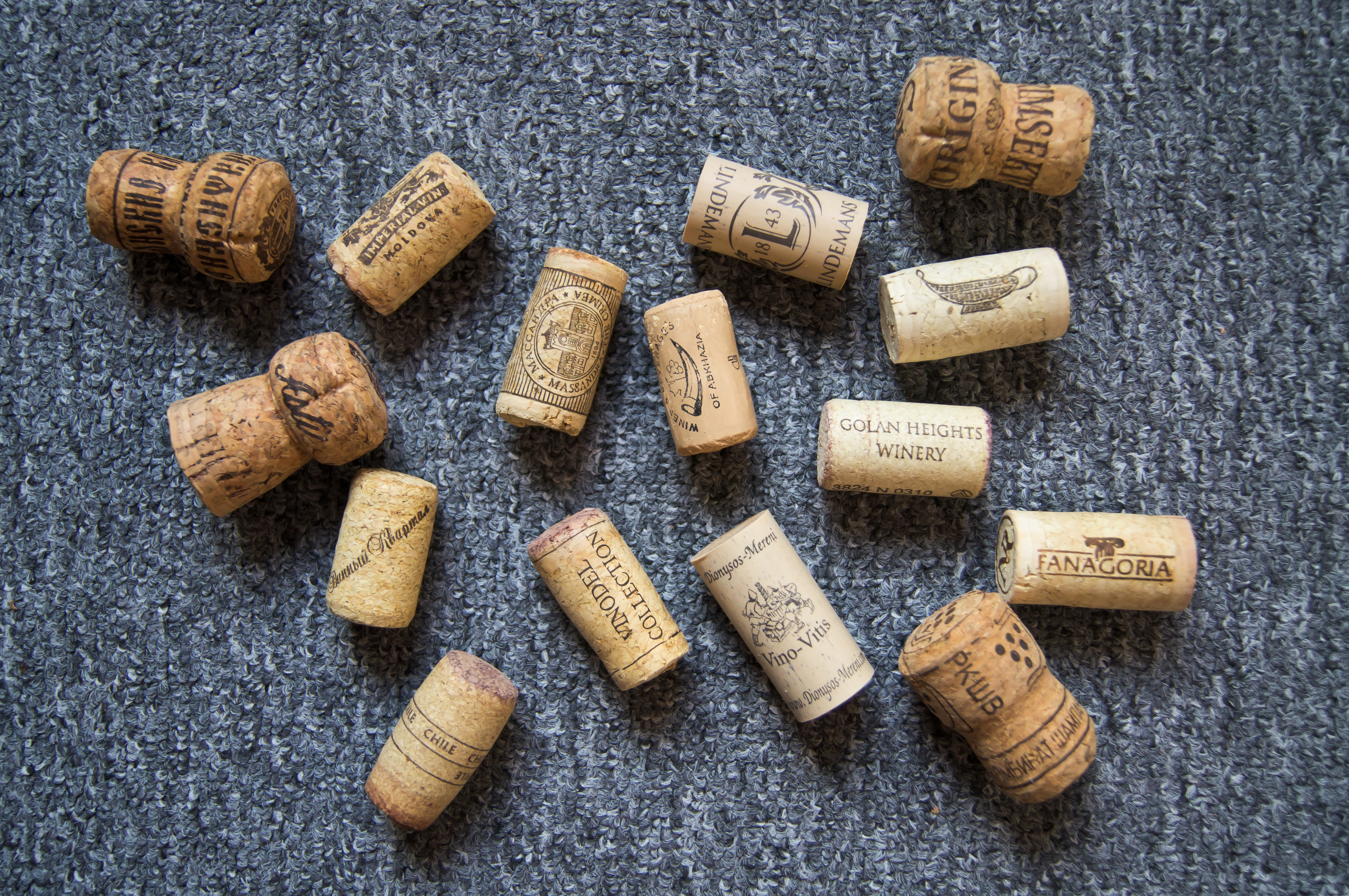
A variety of wine corks

Cork stoppers are moisture-resistant, slow to deteriorate, help wine age, and provide a waterproof seal. The stoppers are associated with a perception of high quality wine, especially as cheaper alternatives are common with lower-cost wine.

Because of the cellular structure of cork, it is easily compressed upon insertion into a bottle and will expand to form a tight seal even with variations in the interior diameter of the neck of glass bottles. However, natural flaws, channels, and cracks in the bark make a cork seal highly inconsistent. A 2005 closure study found that 45% of corks showed gas leakage during pressure testing both from the sides of the cork and through the cork body.

A study conducted by PricewaterhouseCoopers and commissioned by the major cork manufacturer Amorim concluded that cork is the most environmentally responsible stopper, in a one-year life cycle analysis comparison with plastic stoppers and aluminum screw caps.

=== Reuse ===
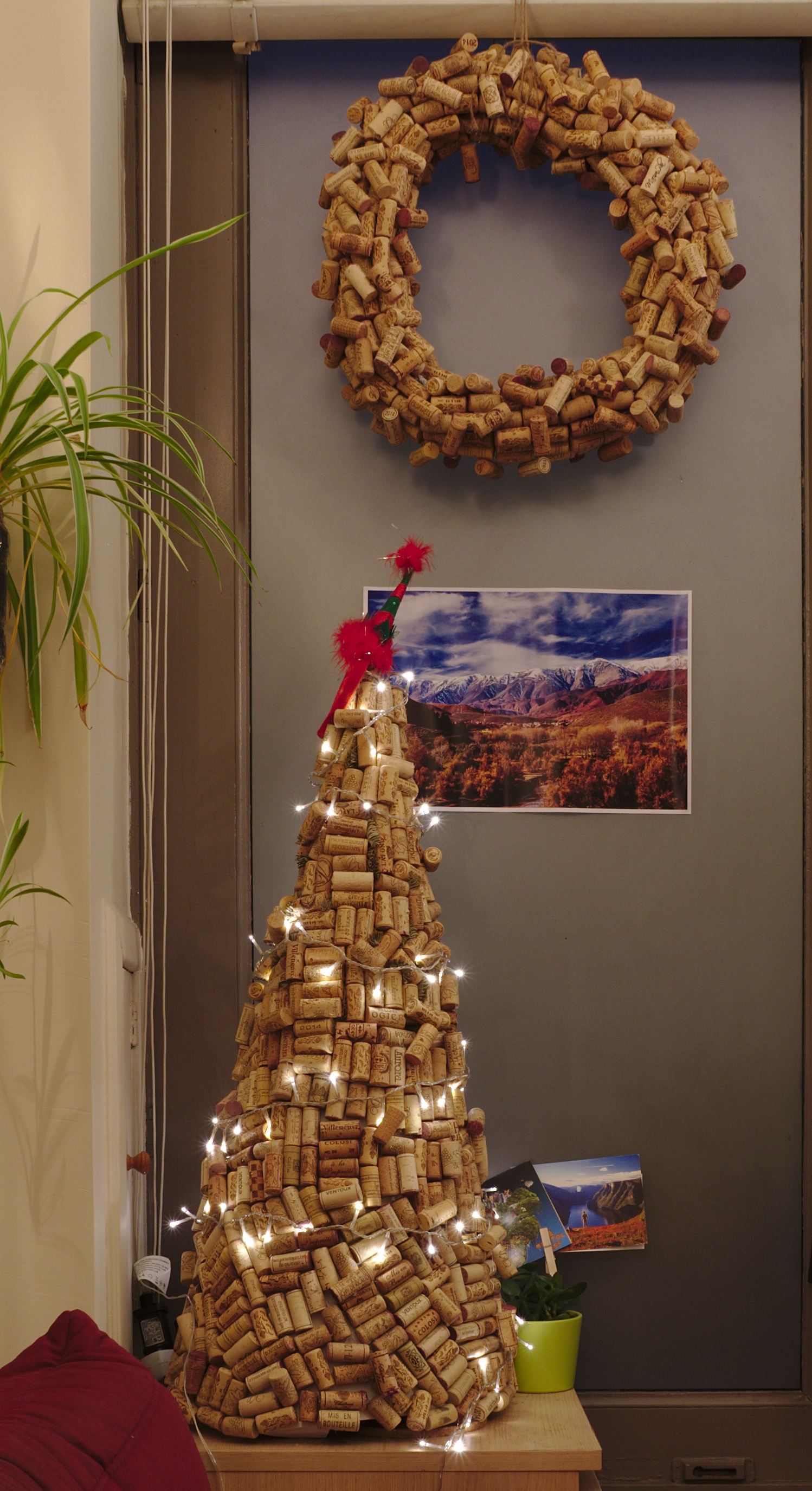
Christmas decor from repurposed corks

Wine corks cannot be reused for wine due to bacterial concerns, but can be recycled into corkboards, coasters, flooring, and craft projects. While many synthetic corks can be recycled, natural corks can either be composted or recycled at specific stores. Companies partner with stores to accept used corks and recycle them into other products; ReCork is the largest of these companies in the United States. Corks can also be recycled through Cork Forest Conservation Alliance.

== Types ==
=== Still wine ===
Corks typically are 24–25 millimetres (0.94–0.98 in) in diameter. Lengths vary, usually based on estimated aging time, with corks for simple wines commonly being 38 millimetres (1.5 in) long, medium aging wines (the most popular size) 44 millimetres (1.7 in), and long aging or expensive wines often 49–55 millimetres (1.9–2.2 in).

=== Sparkling wine ===
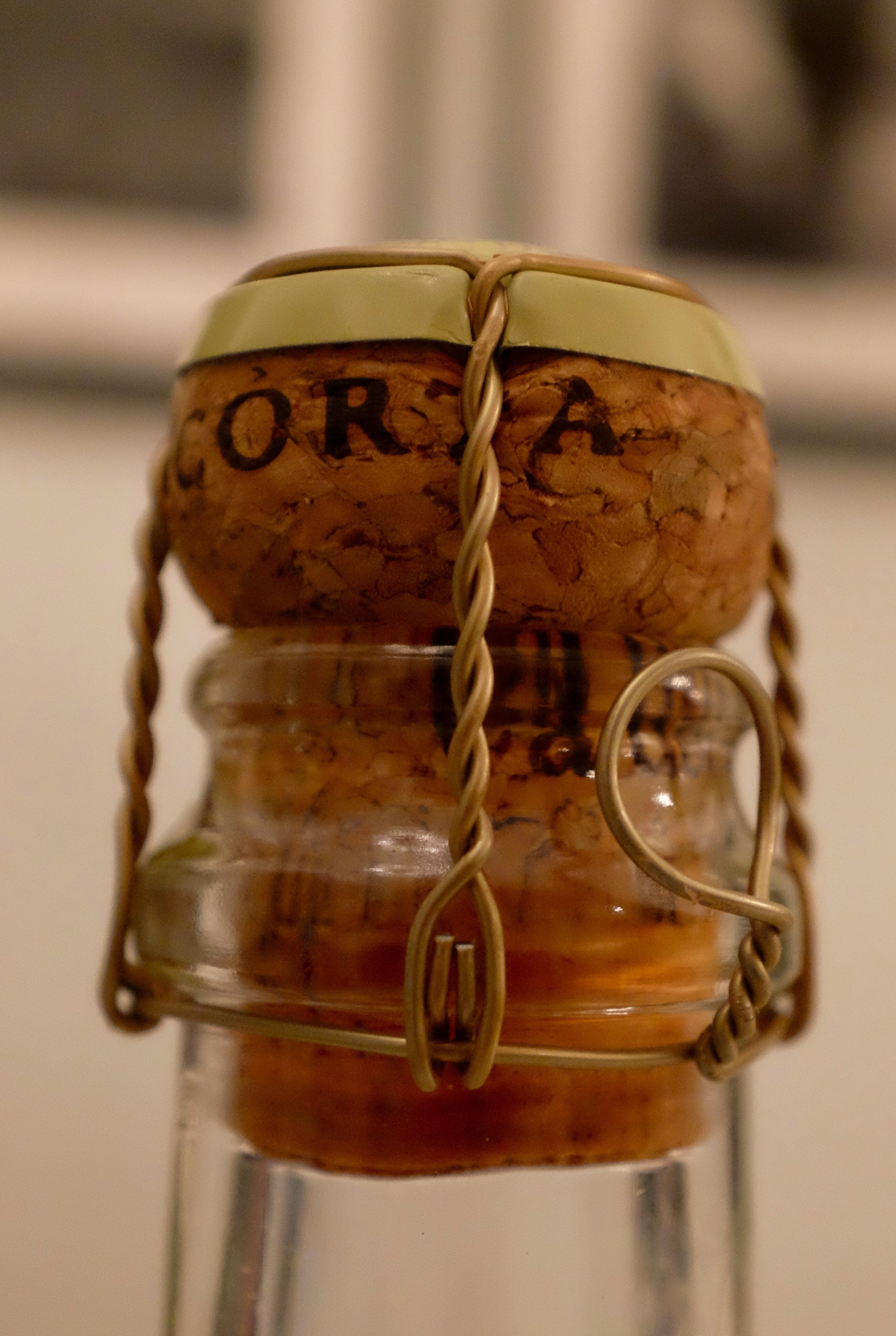
Cork and muselet on a bottle of Franciacorta

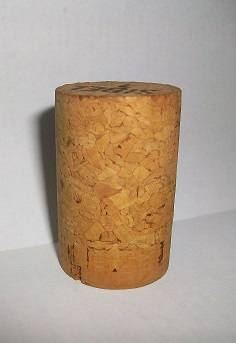
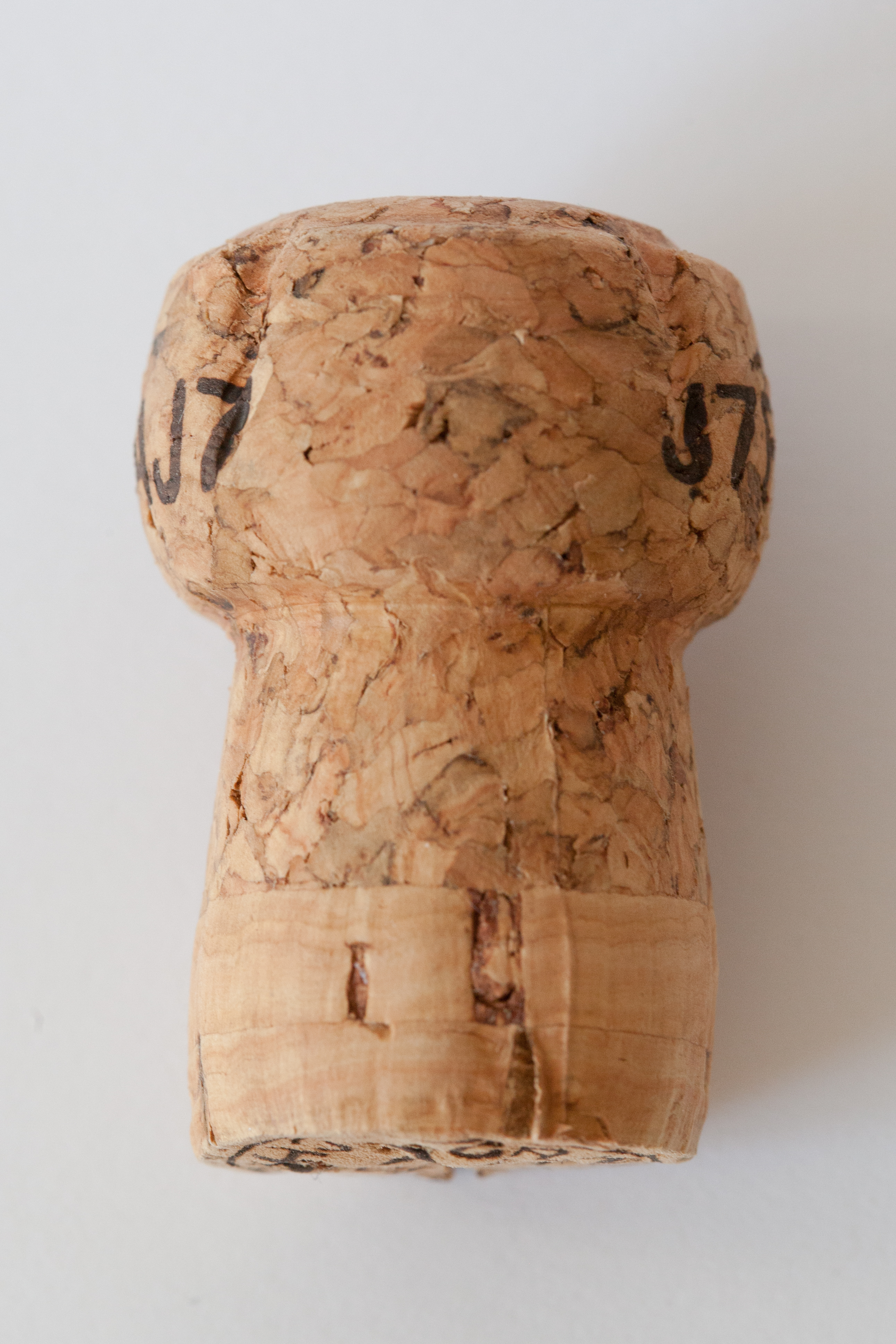
Champagne corks before and after usage

Sparkling wine corks are typically 30 millimetres (1.2 in) in diameter and 50 millimetres (2.0 in) in length. Before insertion, a sparkling wine cork is almost 50% larger than the opening of the bottle. Originally, the cork is a cylinder and when pushed into the bottle, the corks are compressed to about 60–70 percent of their original diameters before insertion. The corks are held in place by wire cages known as muselets. Over time, its compressed shape becomes more permanent, assuming the iconic mushroom form.

=== Natural cork wine corks (one-piece or solid) ===
Natural cork wine corks are manufactured by drilling from a single solid piece of cork. Wine corks may be cylindrical or conical in shape. The dimensions of natural corks vary depending on the type of bottle for which they are intended.

	54x24-26 millimetres	49x24-26 millimetres	45x24-26 millimetres	38X24-26 millimetres	38X22-26 millimetres	33X21-22 millimetres
Bordeaux, Burgundy or Rhine-type bottle (75 cl)	Yes	Yes	Yes	Yes	Yes	No
50 cl bottle	No	No	Yes	Yes	Yes	Yes
Half-bottle (37.5 cl)	No	No	No	Yes	Yes	Yes
Long ageing	Yes	Yes	Yes	Yes	No	No
Medium ageing	No	No	No	No	Yes	Yes

Longer corks are most commonly used for wines associated with longer bottle ageing. However, sealing quality over time depends more on the appropriate cork diameter than on its length. Ideally, a cork should exceed the narrowest diameter of the bottle neck by at least 6 millimetres, so that it is not compressed by more than one third of its diameter when inserted, thereby avoiding damage to the cellular structure of the cork.

==== Natural cork wine corks used for champagne and sparkling wine ====
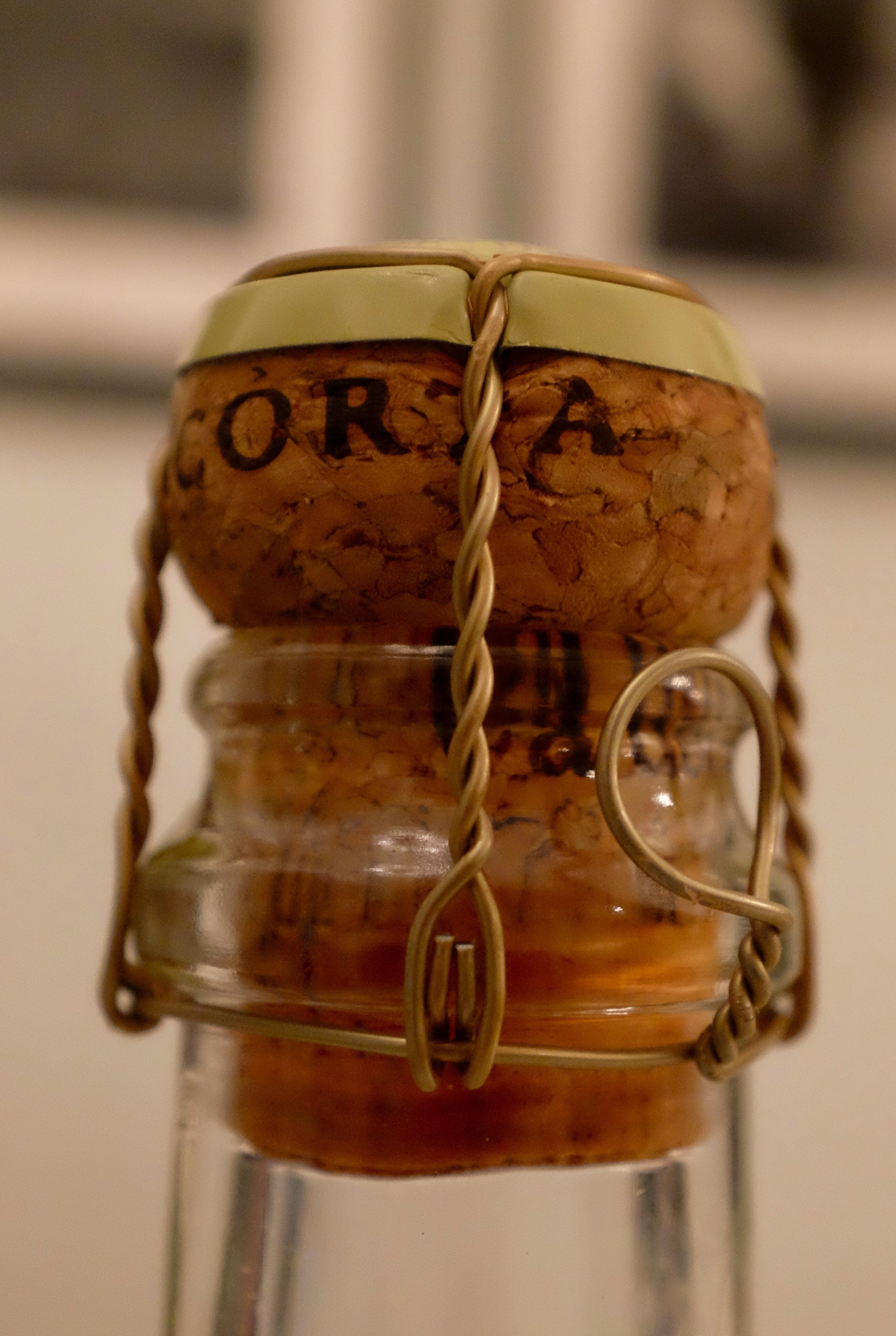
Cork and wire cage in a champagne bottle - the difference between the agglomerated cork body above and the solid cork discs below inside the neck is visible.

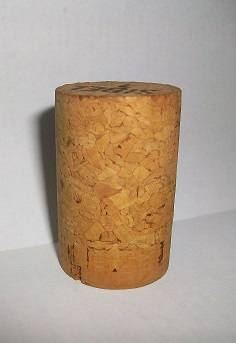
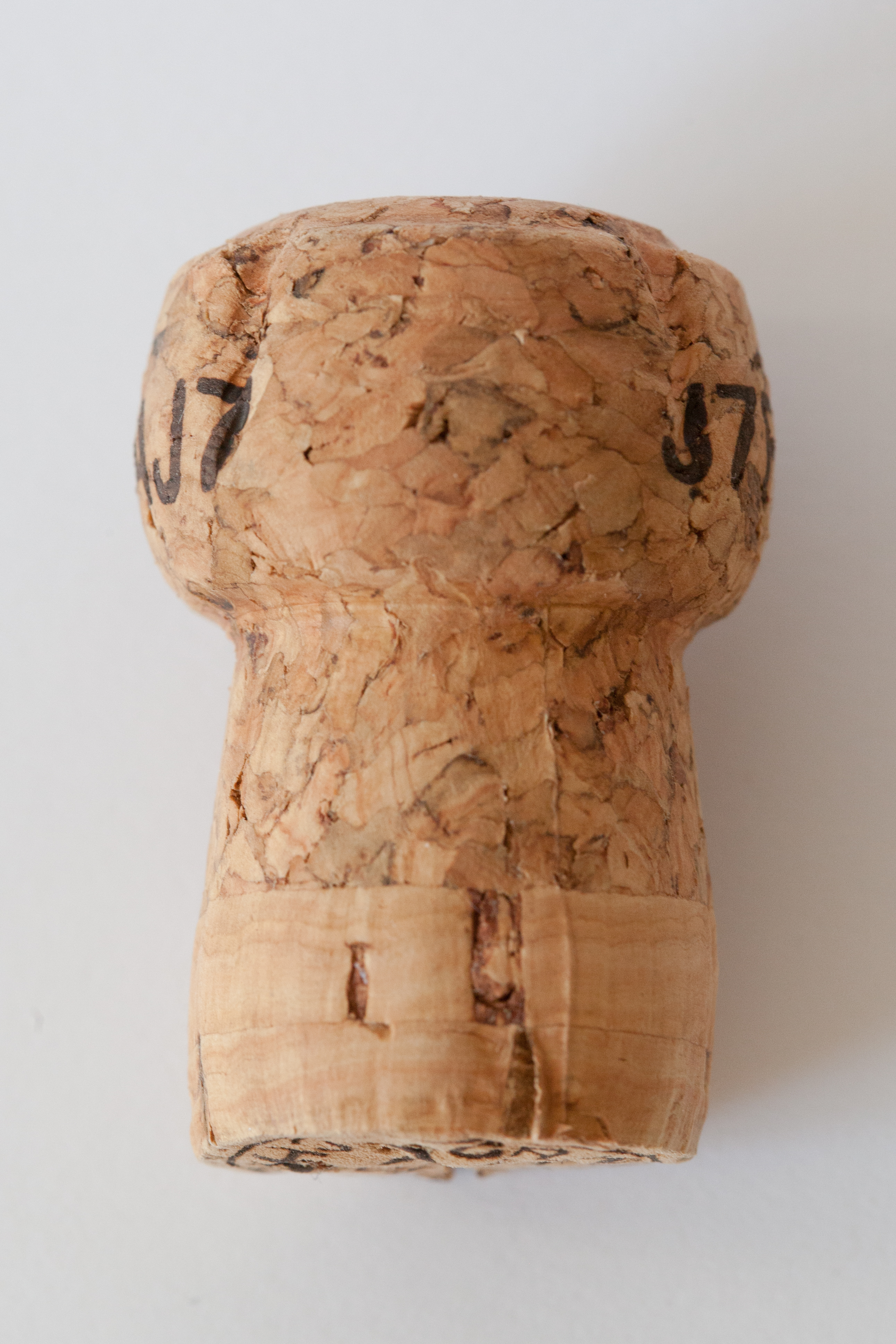
Sparkling wine corks before and after use

This type of cork is specifically intended for sealing champagne, sparkling wines, carbonated wines and cider.

From a technical perspective, some authors classify champagne corks as a subcategory or part of the family of technical corks, since they are produced following the same method. That is, these corks have a body formed by agglomerated cork, to which one, two or three discs of solid natural cork are glued at the base. This is why these corks tend to assume a mushroom shape after bottling.

Champagne corks have a larger diameter, essential to withstand the high pressures inside sparkling-wine bottles. They usually have a diameter of 30 mm and a length of 50 mm. These corks are tied with a wire cage of wire, sometimes also called a muzzle, and this twisted-wire structure is generally accompanied by a metal plate stamped with the brand logo, and in the case of champagne bottles is often covered with foil.

=== Multi-piece natural wine corks ===
This type of cork is produced from two or more pieces of natural cork glued together using adhesives suitable for food contact.

Multi-piece corks are made from thinner cork planks, insufficient for producing single-piece natural corks.

They are characterised by higher density values.

In terms of dimensions and classification, multi-piece corks generally follow the same parameters as single-piece corks. This type of cork is widely used in large-format bottles, since those bottles require larger cork diameters, which are more difficult to manufacture from a single piece.

=== Filled natural cork wine corks ===
This type of natural cork is characterised by having its pores (called lenticels) filled exclusively with cork powder in order to correct the finish of solid natural corks.

The cork powder is fixed into the lenticels using adhesives based on natural resins and rubber. This process is generally carried out using water-based products in order to remove organic solvents from the filling compounds.

Filling improves both the aesthetic appearance of the cork, giving it a more uniform look, and its performance, as it benefits from improved mechanical characteristics.

Filled corks are produced in various formats and sizes. In cylindrical formats, the most common dimensions are:

	49x24 millimetres	38X24 millimetres	38X22 millimetres	33X21 millimetres
Bordeaux, Burgundy or Rhine-type bottle (75 cl)	Yes	Yes	Yes	No
Half-bottle (37.5 cl)	No	No	Sim	Sim
Medium ageing	Yes	Yes	Yes	No

=== Agglomerated wine corks ===
This type of cork is entirely produced from cork granules derived from by-products of solid cork production.

It can be manufactured either by individual moulding or by extrusion. In both methods, the binder used to hold the cork granules together is suitable for food contact.

Agglomerated corks are a more economical option for ensuring proper bottle sealing for a period that should not exceed roughly two years.

In addition to economic advantages for lower-value wines with high turnover, they also offer the benefit of visual uniformity across the batch.

Agglomerated corks are highly industrialised products, and their categories are defined based on cork granule size and final density of the product. Agglomerated corks are mainly produced in the following sizes:

	44x23.5 millimetres	38X23.5 millimetres	33X23.5 millimetres
Bordeaux, Burgundy or Rhine-type bottle (75 cl)	Yes	Yes	No
Half-bottle (37.5 cl)	No	No	Yes
Medium ageing	No	No	No

=== Technical wine corks ===
Technical corks are designed for bottling young wines intended to be consumed within roughly 2 to 3 years. They consist of a dense agglomerated cork body with 2 natural cork discs glued only to the base of the cork or with one disc glued to the top and another to the base of the cork.

To glue the cork discs, binders suitable for food contact are used. This type of cork is chemically stable and mechanically resistant, performing reliably during the twisting it undergoes during bottling and opening.

According to the Australian Wine Research Institute, they have proven to be excellent seals over time, maintaining the necessary concentration of free sulfur dioxide in the bottle and thereby avoiding premature oxidation without developing unpleasant aromas.

The most common market formats are the following:

	44x23.5 millimetres	40 or 39X23.5 millimetres
Bordeaux, Burgundy or Rhine-type bottle (75 cl)	Yes	Yes
Half-bottle (37.5 cl)	No	Yes
Medium ageing	Yes	Yes

=== Microgranulated corks ===
This type of cork belongs to a new generation of cork products, characterised by an agglomerated cork body with a specific granule size distribution. This latest-generation cork product is noted for greater structural stability and sensory neutrality.

The granules in this type of granulated cork are bonded with adhesives suitable for food contact.

This type of cork is intended for wines meant for quick consumption, though with some palate complexity. This type of cork is mainly manufactured with lengths of 49, 45-44 and 38 millimetres.

=== Capsule corks ===
These corks consist of a solid cork, to the top of which a capsule is attached, which may be made of wood, PVC, porcelain, metal, glass, among other materials.

Capsule corks are usually used in fortified wines or spirits, which are ready to drink when released to market. This type of cork is easier to reuse, which is especially useful for this type of product, since it is generally not intended to be consumed all at once.

Examples of products that commonly use this type include many Port wines, Madeira wines, Calvados, Moscatel de Setúbal, and also some whiskies, vodkas, Cognac, Armagnac, brandies, liqueurs and spirits.

For this type of cork, it is not necessary to exceed the internal neck diameter by 6 millimetres; exceeding it by only 2 millimetres is sufficient to achieve a proper seal and allow easy reuse.

On the market, the most common formats correspond to the most widely used bottle sizes. The most common lengths for this type are: 27x20 mm; 27x19.5 mm; 27x18.5 mm; 24x17 mm (for 20 cl bottles); 18x13.5 mm (for miniature bottles).

== See also ==
- Corkscrew
