= Scalping (disambiguation) =

Scalping is the practice of removing the scalp of a defeated enemy as a trophy.

Scalping may also refer to:

- Scalping (trading), in trading securities and commodities either a fraudulent form of market manipulation or a legitimate form of arbitrage
- Flavor scalping, the loss of flavor in a packaged item generally due to its packaging
- Asphalt/Bitumen macadam/Tarmacadam scalpings, gravel scraped off a road when the road is scarified before a new surface is laid
- Ticket resale, the resale of tickets to a public event such as a concert or sporting event

== See also ==
- Scalp (disambiguation)
- Scalphunter (disambiguation)
