= MDMP =

MDMP may refer to:

- 2-Methoxy-3,5-dimethylpyrazine
- Methylenedioxymethylphentermine
- Military Decision Making Process
- Microsoft minidump file, similar in principle to a core dump
- MDMP (band), American rock band
