= Grosset =

Grosset may refer to:

- Grosset Wines, an Australian winery
- Grosset & Dunlap, an American publisher
