= Vestergade 33 =

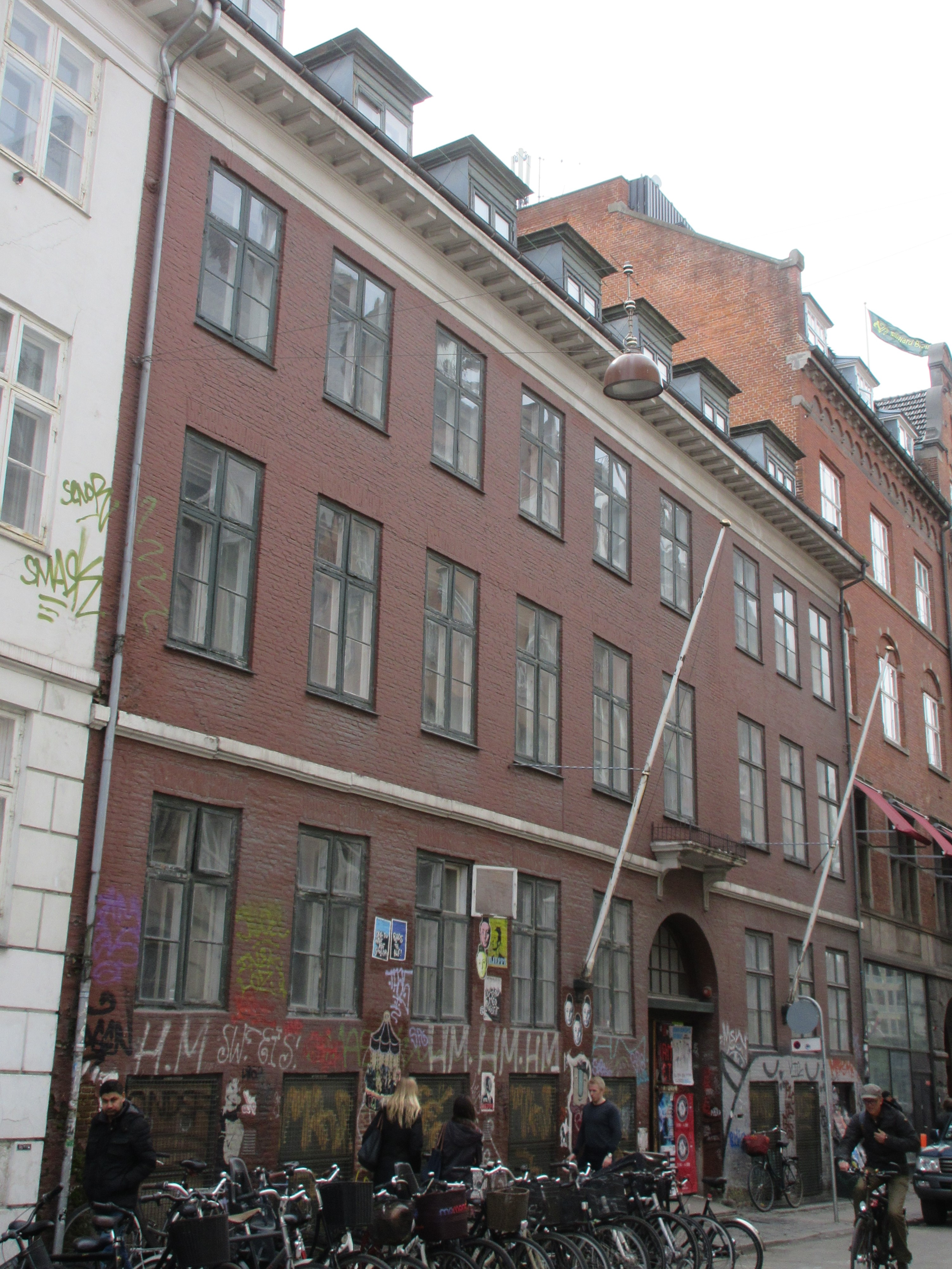
- Interactive map of the Vestergade 33 area

General information
- Location: Copenhagen, Denmark
- Coordinates: 55°40′37.13″N 12°34′9.12″E
- Completed: 1796

Vestergade 33 is a Neoclassical property locate close to City Hall Square in Copenhagen, Denmark. The engineering company FLSmidth was from m 1907 headquartered in the building. The building was listed on the Danish registry of protected buildings and places in 1959 and unlisted 2017.

== History ==
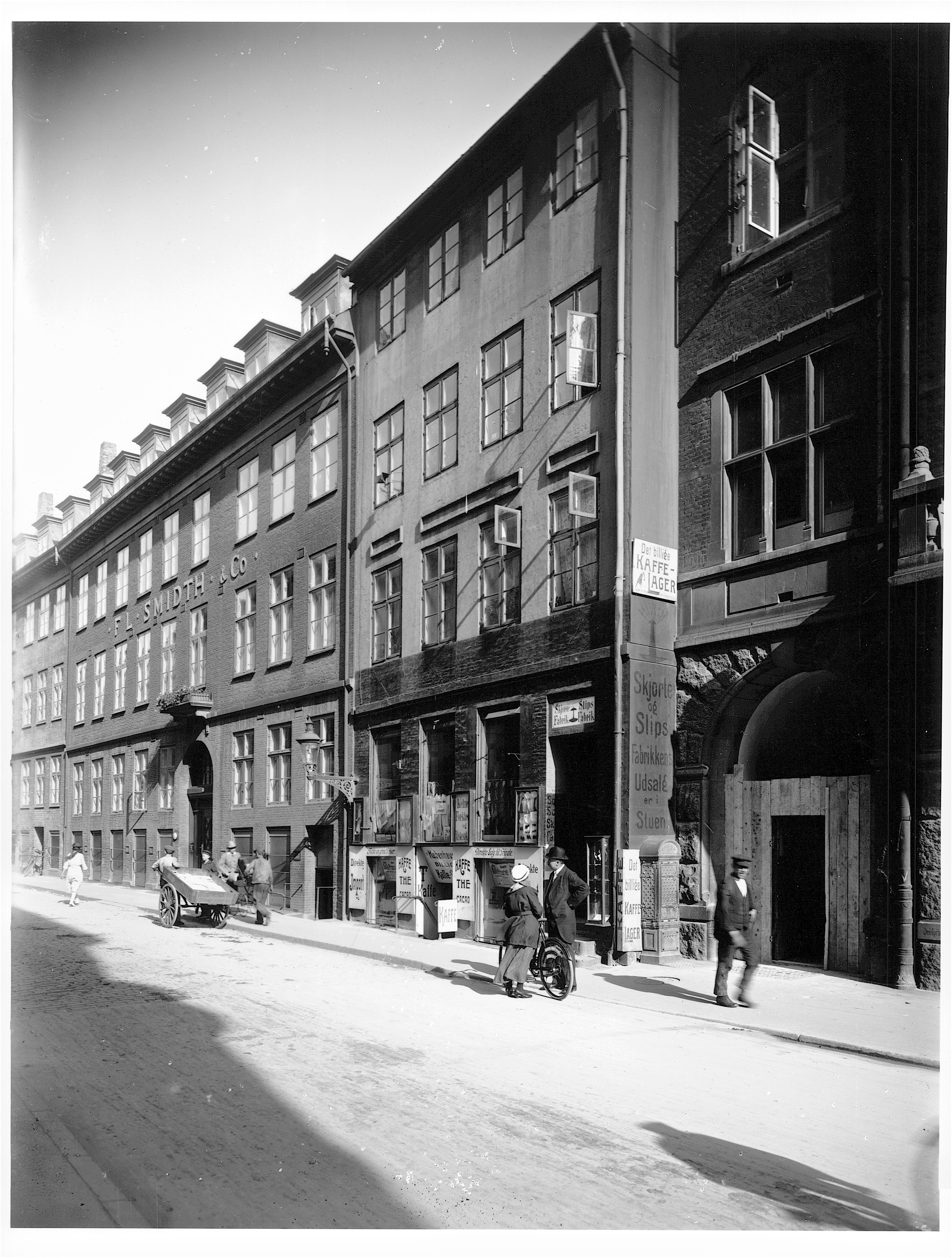
Vestergade 33 photographed by Peter Elfelt in 1918

The building was constructed in 1795-1796 for grocer (hørkræmmer) Ole Schou after the previous building on the site had been destroyed in the Copenhagen Fire of 1795. Carl Edvard Rotwitt lived in the building in 1844–1845. He had become a Supreme Court Attorney in 1842. He was active in politics and would later serve as the Prime Minister of Denmark 1859–1860.

The building was adapted for use as new headquarters for F. L. Smidth & Co. by the architect Gotfred Tvede in 1907.
