= Closure (wine bottle) =

Term for stoppers used to seal wine bottles

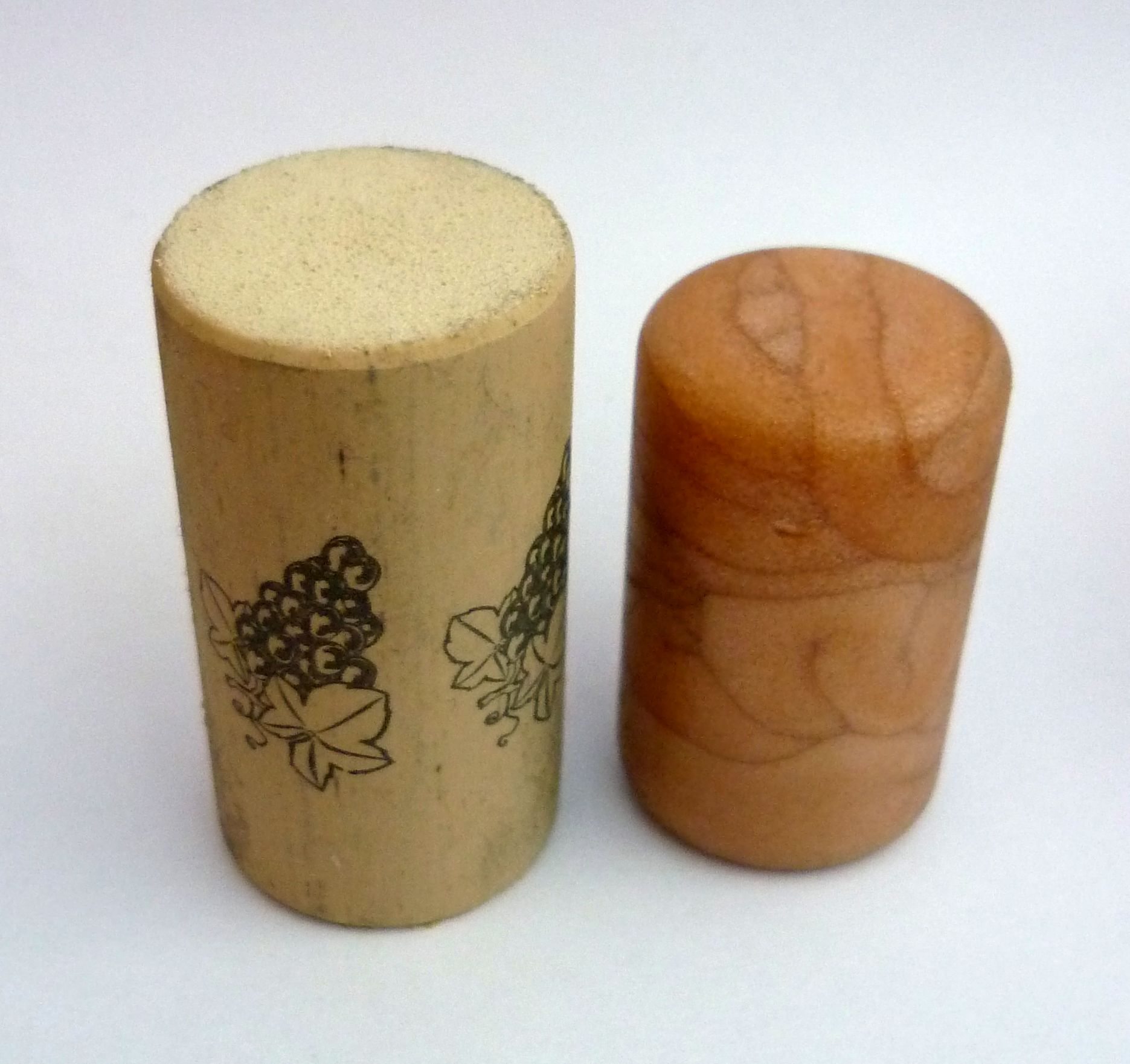
Synthetic corks for bottles

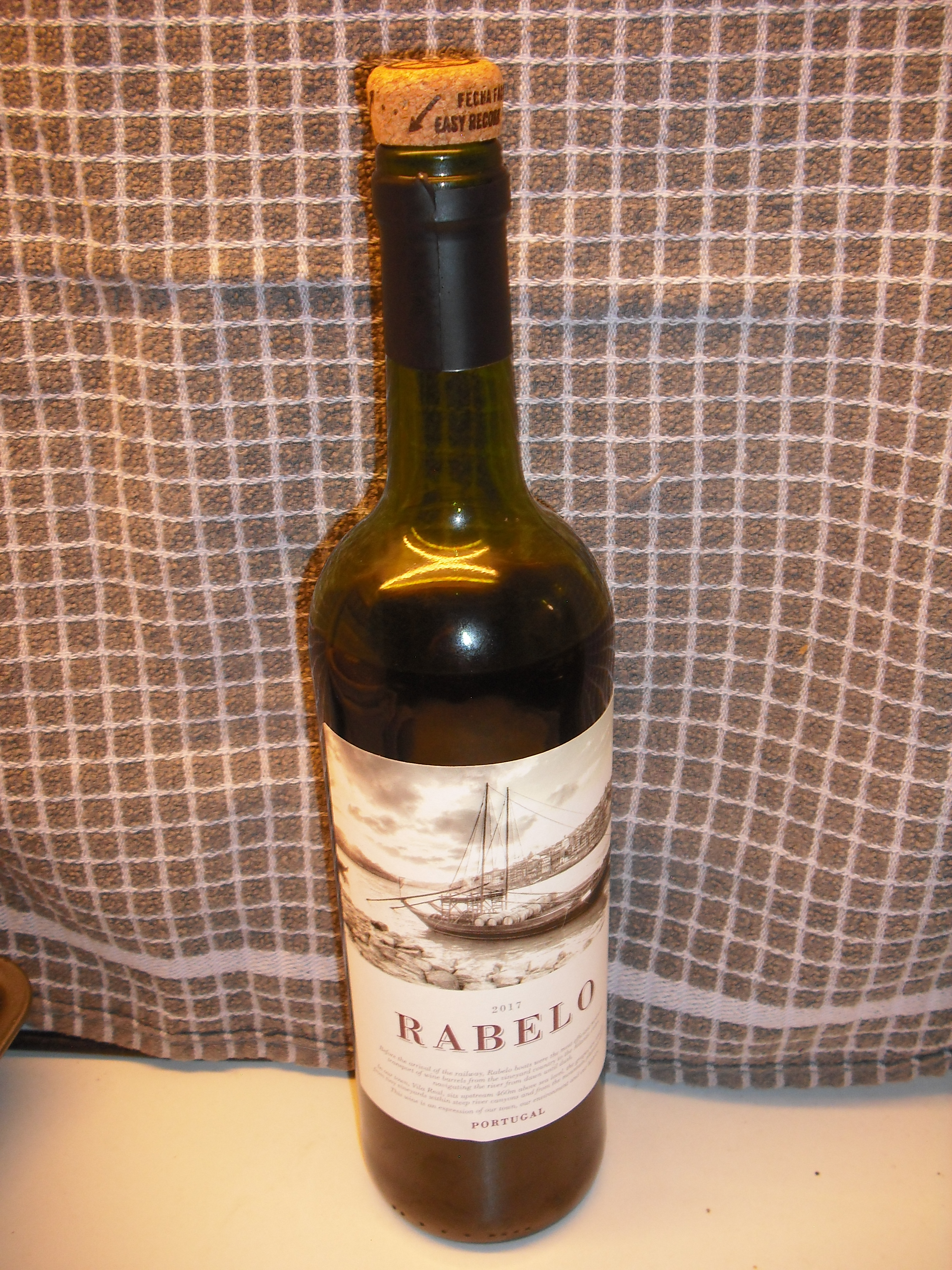
A bottle of wine with an "easy open, easy recork" closure

Closure is a term used in the wine industry to refer to a stopper, an object used to seal a bottle and avoid harmful contact between the wine and oxygen.

They include:

- Traditional natural cork closures ('corks')
- Alternative wine closures, such as screw caps, synthetic closures and glass closures.
- Historical applications no longer in use, such as wooden stoppers with cloth or wax

The choice of closure depends on issues such as the risk of cork taint, oxygen permeability and the desired life of the wine. Another factor is consumer reaction, with the wine-buying public in Australia and New Zealand being positive towards alternative closures, while opinion is divided among consumers in the United States. In Europe, perceptions that associate screw caps with low-quality wine may be declining.

Synthetic wine bottle closures may allow for a controlled oxygen transfer rate.

Some natural cork closures may be "easy open, easy to recork", removing the need for a corkscrew.

== See also ==
- Alternative wine closure
- Aging of wine
