= 2-Methoxy-3,5-dimethylpyrazine =

Aroma compound

Names
- Preferred IUPAC name 2-Methoxy-3,5-dimethylpyrazine
- Other names 3,5-dimethyl-2-methoxypyrazine

Identifiers
CAS Number	92508-08-2
3D model (JSmol)	Interactive image
ChEBI	CHEBI:193651
ChemSpider	4934595
EC Number	809-795-6
PubChem CID	6429218
CompTox Dashboard (EPA)	DTXSID30423905
- InChI: InChI=1S/C7H10N2O/c1-5-4-8-7(10-3)6(2)9-5/h4H,1-3H3 Key: BXKLSVWRSUPMBO-UHFFFAOYSA-N
- SMILES: CC1=CN=C(C(=N1)C)OC

Properties
Chemical formula	C_{7}H_{10}N_{2}O
Molar mass	138.170 g·mol^{−1}
Appearance	Colorless to pale yellow liquid
- Except where otherwise noted, data are given for materials in their standard state (at 25 °C [77 °F], 100 kPa). Infobox references

2-Methoxy-3,5-dimethylpyrazine (sometimes abbreviated as MDMP) is a heterocyclic organic compound, part of methoxypyrazine class. It has a highly potent aroma with a strong musty, moldy, or earthy scent. It is best known as a source of cork taint in wine, secondary in importance to 2,4,6-trichloroanisole (TCA).

== Natural occurrence ==
2-Methoxy-3,5-dimethylpyrazine has been identified as a natural product and a volatile organic compound responsible for off-odors in various products. It is a significant contributor to the "fungal must" or "corky" taint in wine, which is distinct from the smell caused by TCA. The compound is not only found in cork stoppers but can also be present in oak wood used for barrel making. Its presence has also been detected in coffee.

The bacterium Rhizobium excellensis, which is widespread in the soil, is capable of producing 2-methoxy-3,5-dimethylpyrazine from amino acid precursors such as L-leucine and L-alanine. The compound has also been identified as the cause of musty odors in public water supplies.

== Aroma ==
The aroma of 2-methoxy-3,5-dimethylpyrazine is variously described as musty, moldy, earthy, "like a potato bin", or reminiscent of wet cork and fresh hazelnuts. It is an extremely potent odorant with a very low odor detection threshold. In white wine, its threshold has been determined to be as low as 2.1 nanograms per liter. This potency means that even trace amounts of the compound can have a significant negative impact on the sensory profile of a wine or other beverage.

== Synthesis ==
The synthesis is described in detail by Simpson et al.

== Sources ==
- Chatonnet, Pascal; Cunha, Jorge; Rosenthal, Didier; Pons, Monique (8 December 2010). "Origin and Incidence of 2-Methoxy-3,5-dimethylpyrazine, a Compound with a "Fungal" and "Corky" Aroma Found in Cork Stoppers and Oak Chips in Contact with Wines". Journal of Agricultural and Food Chemistry. 58 (23): 12481–12490. Bibcode:2010JAFC...5812481C. doi:10.1021/jf102874f. PMID 21058737.
- Czerny, Michael; Grosch, Werner (2000-03-01). "Potent Odorants of Raw Arabica Coffee. Their Changes during Roasting". Journal of Agricultural and Food Chemistry. 48 (3): 868–872. Bibcode:2000JAFC...48..868C. doi:10.1021/jf990609n. ISSN 0021-8561. PMID 10725165.
- Simpson, Robert F.; Capone, Dimitra L.; Sefton, Mark A. (2004-08-01). "Isolation and Identification of 2-Methoxy-3,5-dimethylpyrazine, a Potent Musty Compound from Wine Corks". Journal of Agricultural and Food Chemistry. 52 (17): 5425–5430. Bibcode:2004JAFC...52.5425S. doi:10.1021/jf049484z. ISSN 0021-8561. PMID 15315380.
- Ventura, Francesc; Quintana, Jordi; Gómez, Mariano; Velo-Cid, Mónica (2009). "Identification of 2-methoxy-3,5-dimethylpyrazine as the obnoxious compound at trace levels in water supplies". AWWA Water Quality Technology Conference. American Water Works Association.
