= FLSmidth =

Multinational technology company based in Copenhagen, Denmark

FLSmidth & Co. A/S
- Type: Publicly traded Aktieselskab
- Traded as: Nasdaq Copenhagen: FLS
- Industry: Construction, engineering
- Founded: 1882; 144 years ago
- Founder: Frederik Læssøe Smidth
- Headquarters: Copenhagen, Denmark
- Key people: Toni Laaksonen (Group CEO); Tom Knutzen (Chairman)
- Products: Machinery, systems and services for the cement and mineral industries
- Revenue: 21.849 billion kr. (2022)
- Net income: 352 million kr. (2022)
- Total assets: 29.85 billion kr. (2022)
- Total equity: 10.79 billion kr. (2022)
- Number of employees: 10,977 (2022)
- Website: www.flsmidth.com

FLSmidth & Co. A/S is a Danish multinational technology company based in Copenhagen, Denmark. With almost 11,000 employees worldwide, it provides the global mining and cement industries with equipment and services. For the mining industry, the company provides technology for copper, gold, nickel, zinc and lithium mining, and for the cement industry, it provides technology for cement production. FLSmidth is listed on NASDAQ OMX Nordic Copenhagen (the former Copenhagen Stock Exchange) in the C25 index and has offices in more than 60 countries worldwide.

== History ==
FLSmidth and Co. A/S was founded in Copenhagen on 2 January 1882 by Frederik Læssøe Smidth (da). It was initially a consultancy business whose main focus was to purchase machinery and build small machines for local craftsmen. Within a few years the firm, called “Technical Bureau” at the time, specialised in machinery for the brick and tile industry. In 1887 two engineers, Poul Larsen (da) and Alexander Foss (da), were made partners and the company name was changed to F.L.Smidth & Co. In 1887, the first FLSmidth cement plant was built near Limhamn in Sweden. The company grew and in 1890 the first international office opened in London. Offices in Paris, New York, Tokyo, Peking (Beijing) and other major cities followed. In 1957, F.L.Smidth machinery accounted for 40 percent of all cement production in the world.

In 1954, FLSmidth inaugurated its head office in Vigerslev Alle in the Copenhagen suburb of Valby, becoming an iconic part of the city landscape with its highly praised red-brick buildings. The building was designed by the architect Palle Suenson. In 2022, FLSmidth announced that it will move to a new head office in Copenhagen, likely in the second half of 2024.

Over the years, the company has expanded with non-core activities and in 1989 the entire FLSmidth Group consisted of some 125 companies within areas such as cement engineering, plastic, aerospace and cement building materials. Throughout the 1990s, product companies such as Pfister, Ventomatic and MAAG Gear were acquired.

In 1990, the Group acquired Fuller Company and established the F.L.Smidth-Fuller Engineering Group. Two minerals processing divisions, Fuller Mineral Processing and FLSmidth Mineral Processing, were set up in FLSmidth and Fuller. In 1997, the company was named FFE Minerals after merging the two separate minerals divisions into one single company.

FLS Miljø developed a process with Supercritical carbon dioxide to dissolve and carry organic wood preservative into timber, an alternative to polluting Chromated copper arsenate (CCA).

As FLS Miljø was closed in 2004, some of the employees later contributed to a similar process to remove cork tainting 2,4,6-Trichloroanisole (TCA) from wine corks.

In the beginning of the 21st century the Group began to continuously sell off non-core activities.

On 2 April 2007, FFE Minerals acquired Rahco International, Inc. In May 2007, FFE Minerals was renamed FLSmidth Minerals and on 10 August 2007, FLSmidth acquired GL&V Process, at that point the company's largest acquisition, enabling it to gain a foothold in the global copper industry.

In May and October 2008, FLSmidth acquired Pneumapress Inc. and CEntry, an engineering consultancy based in Utah.

In 2009, FLSmidth acquired Conveyor Engineering Inc. and EEL India Limited on 1 March 2009 and 28 July 2009 respectively. These acquisitions gave FLSmidth a know-how in design and supply of major bulk material handling systems for cement, mining, heavy industrial facilities and bagging equipment worldwide.

The year 2011 saw FLSmidth acquiring some major minerals and cement companies like ESSA Australia Limited on 17 February 2011, Phillips Kiln Service Ltd on 18 August 2011 and Transweigh India Ltd on 20 October 2011.

On 3 July 2012, FLSmidth completed the acquisition of the Australian engineering and equipment supply company Ludowici Limited, a provider of coal centrifuges, vibrating screens and complementary wear resistant products and services for the minerals industries.

In 2012, FLSmidth acquired Decanter Machine, Inc., a United States-based manufacturer and supplier of centrifugal technology to the global minerals industries (August), TEUTRINE GmbH Industrie-Technik, a German company specialised in mobile solutions for repairs, refurbishments and installation services (September) and Australian service companies MIE Enterprises Pty Ltd. and Mayer Bulk Pty Ltd. that provide construction, commissioning, maintenance and repair services.

In line with its heightened focus on core businesses areas such as cement and minerals, FLSmidth divested the capital sales of lime kilns and recausticizing equipment for use in white liquor plants in the pulp and paper industry. The business was divested to Metso Paper Sweden AB by means of a license agreement. The licence was perpetual and exclusive in relation to FLSmidth.

In 2022, FLSmidth acquired Mining Technologies, the mining division of German thyssenkrupp, which is the company’s largest acquisition. With this, FLSmidth becomes the world’s leading supplier of technology and services to the global mining industry. Following the integration of Mining Technologies, the proportion of FLSmidth’s mining-related business increased to 65% of the company’s operations.

In 2025, FLSmidth divested its Cement business to an affiliate of Pacific Avenue Capital Partners as part of its transition to a mining-focused company. The company subsequently rebranded as FLS, becoming a pure-play supplier of technology and services to the mining industry.

=== Acquisition history ===
- FLSmidth
  - - FLSmidth and Co. A/S
      (Founded 1882)
  - - Fuller Company
      (Acq 1990)

== Core business and Group strategy ==
In 2019, through the sustainability pledge “MissionZero”, FLSmidth committed to providing technologies to accelerate mining and cement towards zero emissions by 2030. Mining and cement operations have a significant impact on the environment, contributing approximately 10% of global CO_{2} emissions. The company already has much of the technology needed to help both industries reduce emissions, while new technologies will be developed through R&D partnerships with customers, universities, start-ups and companies from different industries.

In 2021, FLSmidth signed up to the Science Based Targets initiative, gaining validation for specific sustainability-related targets aligned to the most ambitious scenario of the 2015 Paris Agreement, which aims to keep global warming below 1.5°C.

In 2023, FLSmidth announced the division of its operations into two stand-alone entities in a so-called “pure play strategy”. The Mining and Cement divisions operate independently, each with their own business strategy and organisational structure.
