= Grosset Wines =

Winery in South Australia

Grosset Wines is an Australian winery based in the Clare Valley wine region of South Australia.

== History ==
Jeffrey Grosset graduated from Roseworthy College with an Agriculture degree in 1973 and an Oenology degree in 1975.

Grosset Wines was established by Jeffrey Grosset in 1981. The winery and subsequently opened cellar door operates in Auburn inside a building previously used as a butter and ice factory in the early 1900s.

Grosset was the leader of an eventually successful movement in the 1980s to only allow the use of the word Riesling on Australian wines that were made specifically from the Riesling grape. Until that point a significant number of Australian wines with Riesling on their label were made from other grapes, including Hunter Riesling and Shepherds Riesling (both Semillon), Clare Riesling (Crouchen) and "Riesling" as a generic term for white wine, often in the form of very cheap Cask wine made from Sultana or Pedro Ximénez.

Jeffrey Grosset was also a driving force behind a decision in 2000 by Clare Valley Riesling producers to switch over to Screw cap closures for their wines and to then promote the use of screwcaps across the Australian and New Zealand wine industries. The entire range of Grosset wines is now released under Screw cap. Jeffrey Grosset was a contributing editor to the book Taming the screw : a manual for winemaking with screw caps, released in 2005. Grosset has also established the Australian Closure Fund to encourage scientific research comparing various types of wine closures.

Jeffrey Grosset's partner, Stephanie Toole, has owned and run Mount Horrocks Wines, also in the Clare Valley, since 1993. Stephanie and Jeffrey were named one of wine's five most influential couples by Decanter magazine in December 2009. They have one daughter, Georgina.

Jeffrey Grosset has received a great deal of local and international individual recognition for his wine making, including being the first recipient of "Australian Winemaker of the Year" from Gourmet Traveller Wine magazine and the "International Riesling Winemaker of the Year" at the Riesling Summit II, both in 1998. He was noted in 2005 to be one of the world's "50 Most Influential Winemakers" by Wine & Spirits and named as one of the "Top 10 White Winemakers" in the world by Decanter in 2006.

== Wines ==
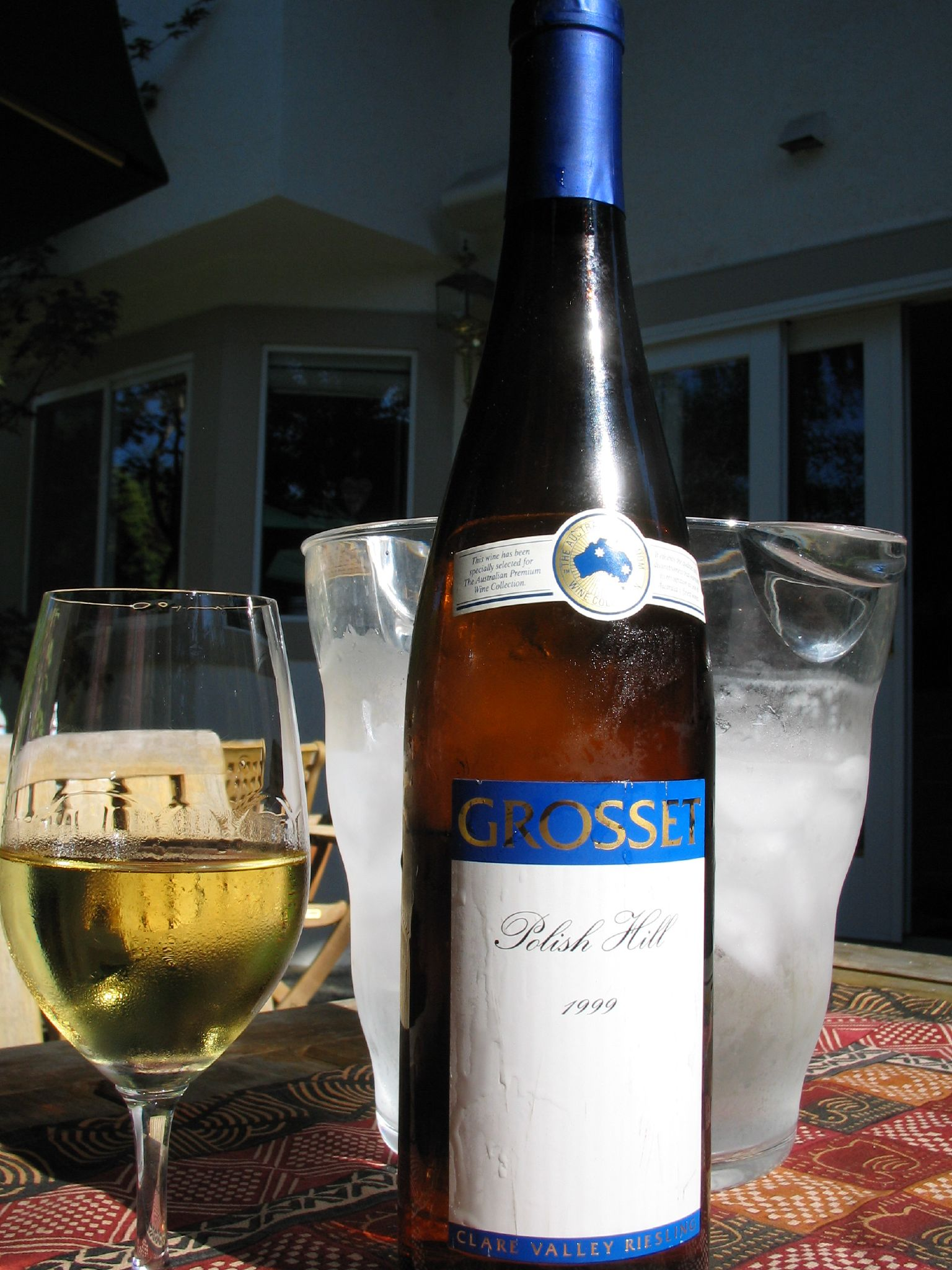
A bottle of Grosset Polish Hill Riesling

Grosset is best known for its range of wines made from the Riesling grape. Jeffrey Grosset has been described by James Halliday as "Australia's foremost riesling maker" and by Jancis Robinson as "Australia's acknowledged king of Riesling".

The two Rieslings that were initially released from the 1981 vintage were "Watervale" from the 6 hectare Springvale vineyard and "Polish Hill" from the Polish Hill vineyard. Both have been produced every vintage since, making 2010 the 30th consecutive release of each wine. The Grosset Polish Hill Riesling was described by Robert Parker as "The finest riesling I have ever tasted from Australia". The Langton's Classification of Australian Wine places the Watervale Riesling at the second highest level of "Outstanding" and the Polish Hill Riesling at the highest level of "Exceptional".

A third Off-dry style Riesling was released in 2010 with 16 grams per litre of residual sugar, this was renamed to "Alea" in 2012 and is sourced from the Rockwood Vineyard.

A Cabernet Sauvignon, Cabernet Franc and Merlot blend is made from the Gaia vineyard and labeled with the same name, "Gaia". The first vintage released of the wine was the 1990. 70% of the vineyard is planted with Cabernet Sauvignon, 25% with Cabernet Franc and 5% Merlot. The vineyard was planted in 1986 and is named after a theory and set of books published by James Lovelock about the balance of life on Earth. The Grosset Gaia Fund was established by Grosset in 2007 to support charities that focus on art, youth and the environment with a total of $1 million Australian dollars the target to invest from the sale of the Gaia wine for the first three years of the fund.

Grosset produces a range of other well regarded wines. A Sémillon-Sauvignon blanc blend with the Semillon coming from the Clare Valley and the Sauvignon blanc from the Adelaide Hills. A Chardonnay from the Piccadilly vineyard and a Pinot noir, with both coming from vineyards in the Adelaide Hills. Under 10,000 total cases of wine are produced each vintage.

Jeffrey Grosset is also part of a collaborative project with Robert Hill Smith from Yalumba, making an Eden Valley Riesling named "mesh" each year since the 2002 vintage.

== See also ==
- Australian wine
