= Flavor scalping =

Packaging industry's term

Flavor scalping is a term used in the packaging industry to describe the loss of quality of a packaged item due to either its volatile flavors being absorbed by the packaging or the item absorbing undesirable flavors from its packaging. A classic example is the absorption of various plastic flavors when soft drinks are stored in plastic bottles for an extended period.

== See also ==
- Cork tainting
