= Scalp (disambiguation) =

The scalp is the area of the head where hair grows.

Scalp, Scalps or SCALP may also refer to:

- "The Scalp", a geological feature of Barnaslingan, a hill in County Dublin, Ireland
- Section carrément anti-Le Pen (SCALP), a French anti-fascist organisation
- Scalps (1983 film), an American horror film
- Scalps (1987 film), a Spaghetti Western

== See also ==
- Storm Shadow, an Anglo-French air-launched cruise missile called SCALP-EG ("Système de Croisière Autonome à Longue Portée – Emploi Général")
- Scalping (disambiguation)
