= Alternative wine closure =

Alternative methods for wine closure

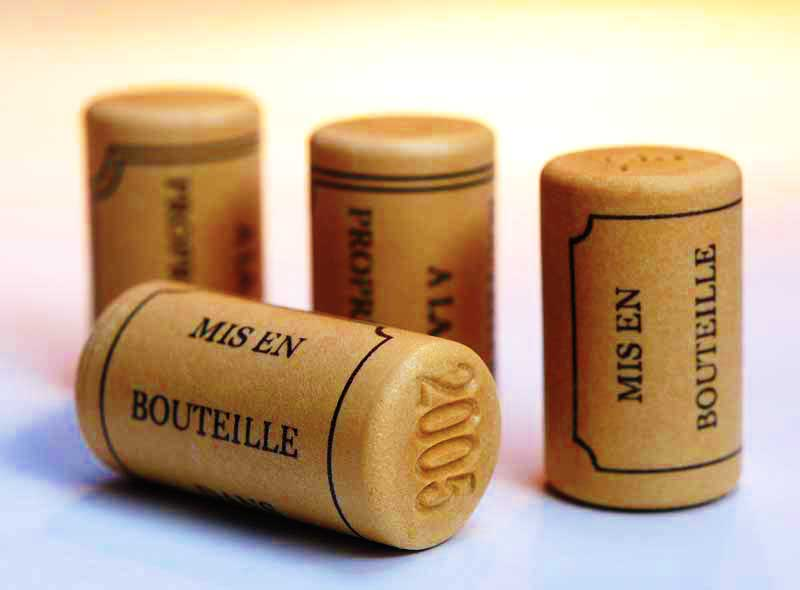
Synthetic wine closure

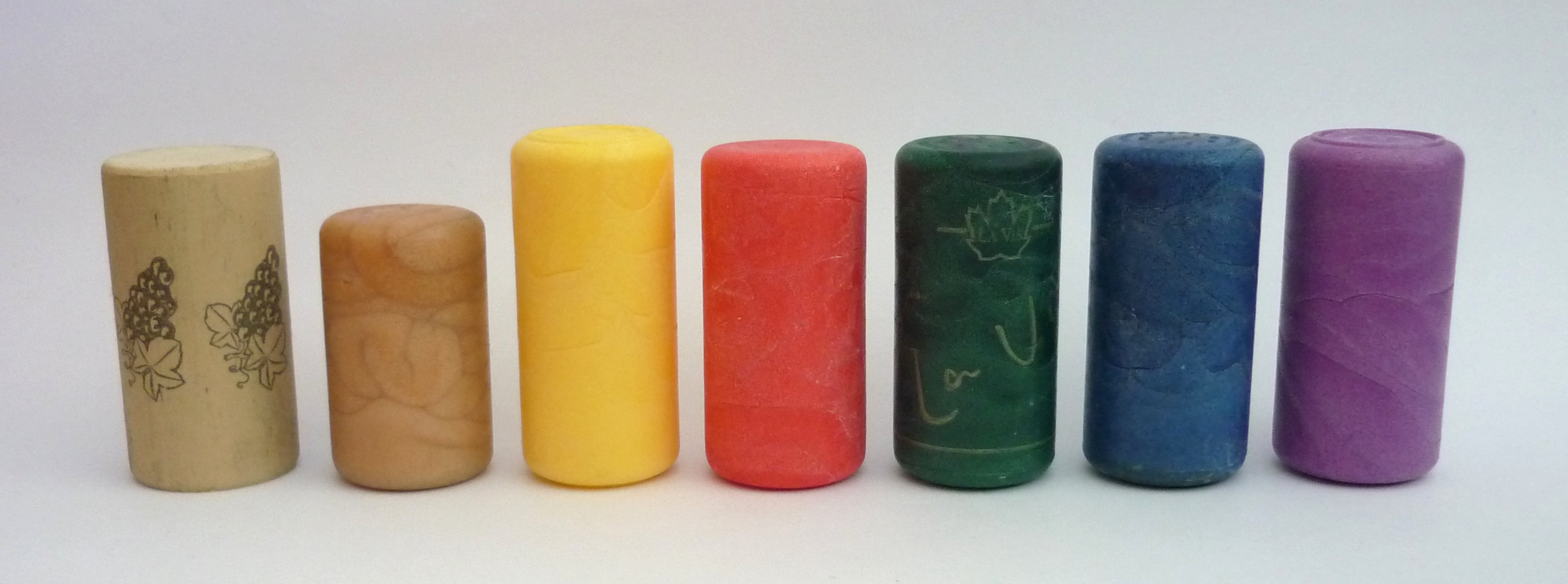
Synthetic wine closures

Alternative wine closures are substitute closures used in the wine industry for sealing wine bottles in place of traditional cork closures. The emergence of these alternatives has grown in response to quality control efforts by winemakers to protect against "cork taint" caused by the presence of the chemical trichloroanisole (TCA).

The closures debate, chiefly between supporters of screw caps and natural corks, has increased the awareness of post-bottling wine chemistry, and the concept of winemaking has grown to continue after the bottling process, because closures with different oxygen transmission rates may lead to wines that taste different when they reach consumers.

The cork-industry group APCOR cites a study showing a 0.7–1.2% taint rate. In a 2005 study of 2800 bottles tasted at the Wine Spectator blind-tasting facilities in Napa, California, 7% of the bottles were found to be tainted.

== Synthetic corks ==
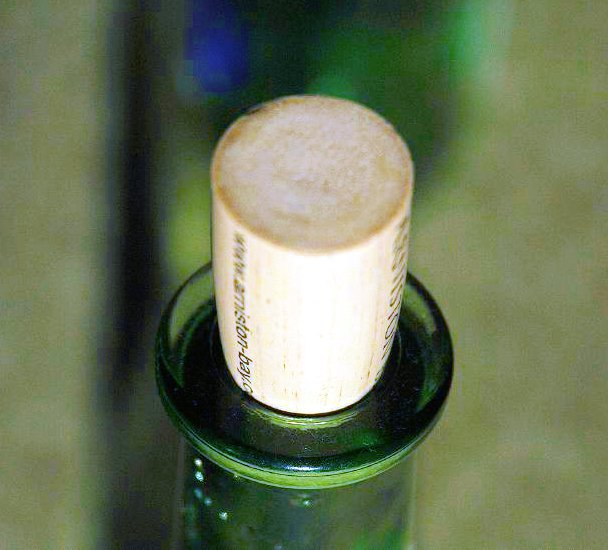
A synthetic cork is designed to look and function like natural cork

Synthetic corks are made from plastic compounds designed to look and "pop" like natural cork, but without the risk of TCA contamination. Disadvantages of synthetic corks include a risk of harmful air entering a bottle after as little as 18 months, difficulty in extracting them from the bottle, and difficulty in using the cork to reseal the wine. James Laube of Wine Spectator notes that some can also impart a slight chemical flavour to the wine.

Unlike natural corks, many synthetic corks are made from material that is not biodegradable. There are two main production techniques for synthetic wine closures: injection molding and extrusion. There are also methods claimed to combine the two techniques of injection and extrusion. A 2007 study by Victor Segalen Bordeaux 2 University showed that injection-molded synthetic corks allowed the highest levels of oxygen permeation when compared to natural cork and screw caps, offering the lowest protection against oxidation of the wine.

Synthetic wine bottle closures may allow for a controlled oxygen transfer rate, which affects the sensory characteristics.

== Screw caps ==
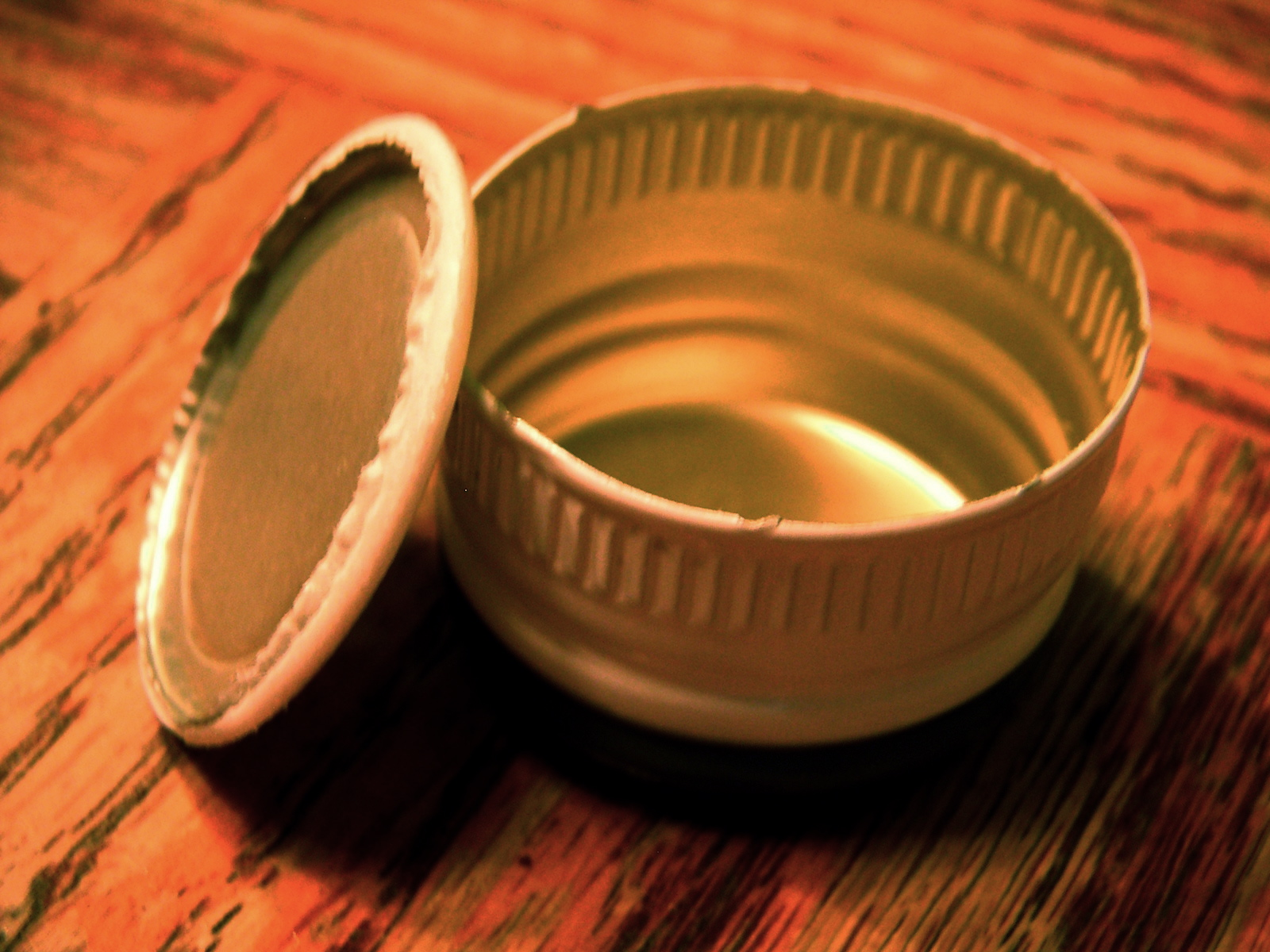
Stelvin cap, disassembled

Screw caps or "Stelvin caps" are closures made only from aluminium material that threads onto the bottleneck. They are the predominant closure used by Austrian, Australian and New Zealand wineries. This can be attributed in part to the New Zealand screw cap initiative which promotes the use of screw caps instead of cork. Screw caps form a tighter seal and can keep out oxygen for a longer time than cork. These benefits aid in maintaining the wine's overall quality and aging potential. Michel Laroche of Domaine Laroche noted that this played a role in his decision to adopt screwcaps. "Extensive quality tests show convincing results: apart from protecting against cork taint, screwcaps are also beneficial in the aging of wine, particularly preserving the aromatic freshness."

An often cited contradiction is the case of experiments carried out by Château Haut-Brion in the 1970s, when 100 bottles were placed under screwcap for long term observation. The result was, according to Haut-Brion manager Jean-Bernard Delmas, that "it worked perfectly for the first ten years, until the plastic in the caps went brittle and let air in".

A disadvantage of screw caps according to wine expert Jancis Robinson is the opposite of oxidation: reduction, which may suppress a wine's aroma and possibly cause unpleasant ones, a problem that particularly affects Sauvignon blanc which is a grape variety with natural tendencies toward reduction. Furthermore, there is the screwcap's public image, as "consumers still perceive screwcaps as being for 'cheap' wines (regardless of the price tag)".

In a 2004 study of consumer opinions conducted by the wine consulting firm Wine Intelligence found that nearly 52% of American consumers and 60% of British consumers reject the idea of using screwcaps for their fine wine. The 2007 Victor Segalen University study in Bordeaux showed that screw caps closures allowed the lowest amount of oxygen permeation when compared to natural and synthetic corks, offering the highest level of protection against oxidation of the wine.

Following studies by the faults clinic at the International Wine Challenge in September 2006, it became widely reported in British newspapers that test results show that one in 50 screwcap bottles, 200,000 bottles worldwide, may be affected by the chemical process sulphidisation. Jamie Goode presented arguments against reports he described to "represent the science of closures badly, are filled with inaccuracies and misunderstandings, and do not serve the wine industry well", and addressed the inaccuracies in specific points.

== Vino-Seal and Vinolok ==
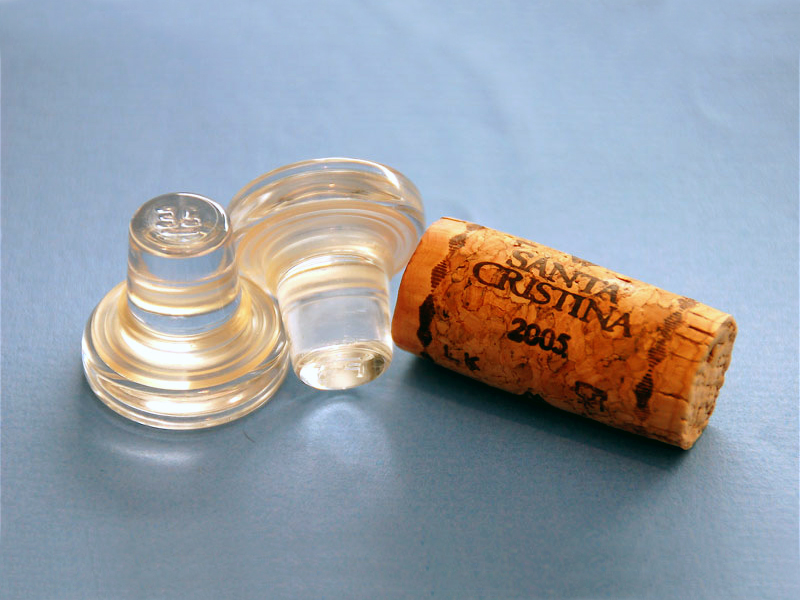
Glass Stopper compared with corkstopper

Vino-Seal, also sold as Vinolok, is a plastic/glass closure originally developed by Alcoa and now produced by Czech crystal glass producer Preciosa. Since its introduction into the European market in 2003, over 300 wineries have utilized the closure. Using a glass stopper with an inert o-ring, the closure is claimed to create a hermetic seal that prevents oxidation and TCA contamination. A disadvantage of the closure is the relatively high cost of each plug (70 cents each) and cost either of manual bottling, or else obtaining compatible bottling equipment.

== Zork ==
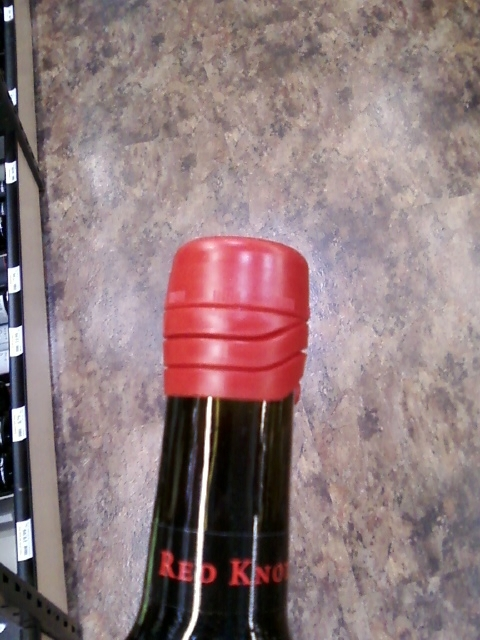
A bottle of wine sealed with a Zork.

Zork is an alternative wine closure for still wines, that seals like a screw cap and pops like a cork, created by an Australian company of the same name. The closure has three parts: an outer cap providing a tamper-evident clamp that locks onto the band of a standard cork mouth bottle; an inner metal foil which provides an oxygen barrier similar to a screw cap, and an inner plunger which creates the ‘pop’ on extraction and reseals after use. Introduced in 2010, it is the first on-bottle, resealable closure for sparkling wines.

== Opposition ==
There is continuing opposition to the use of alternative closures in some parts of the winemaking industry. In March 2006, the Spanish government outlawed the use of alternative wine closures in 11 of Spain's wine-producing regions as part of their (Denominación de Origen) D.O. regulations.

Although environmentalists lament the loss of cork forests to commercial crops such as eucalyptus, advocates of artificial corks claim that "natural corks" are just "granules and dust bonded with solvents", and no more biodegradable than the artificial product. "Granules and dust bonded with solvents" describes "agglomerate corks." These differ from "natural corks" that are one piece made out of cork bark.

== See also ==
- Wine cork
- Box wine
- Bung
- Cork material
- Storage of wine
