= Muselet =

Wire cage to secure corked bottles of carbonated beverages

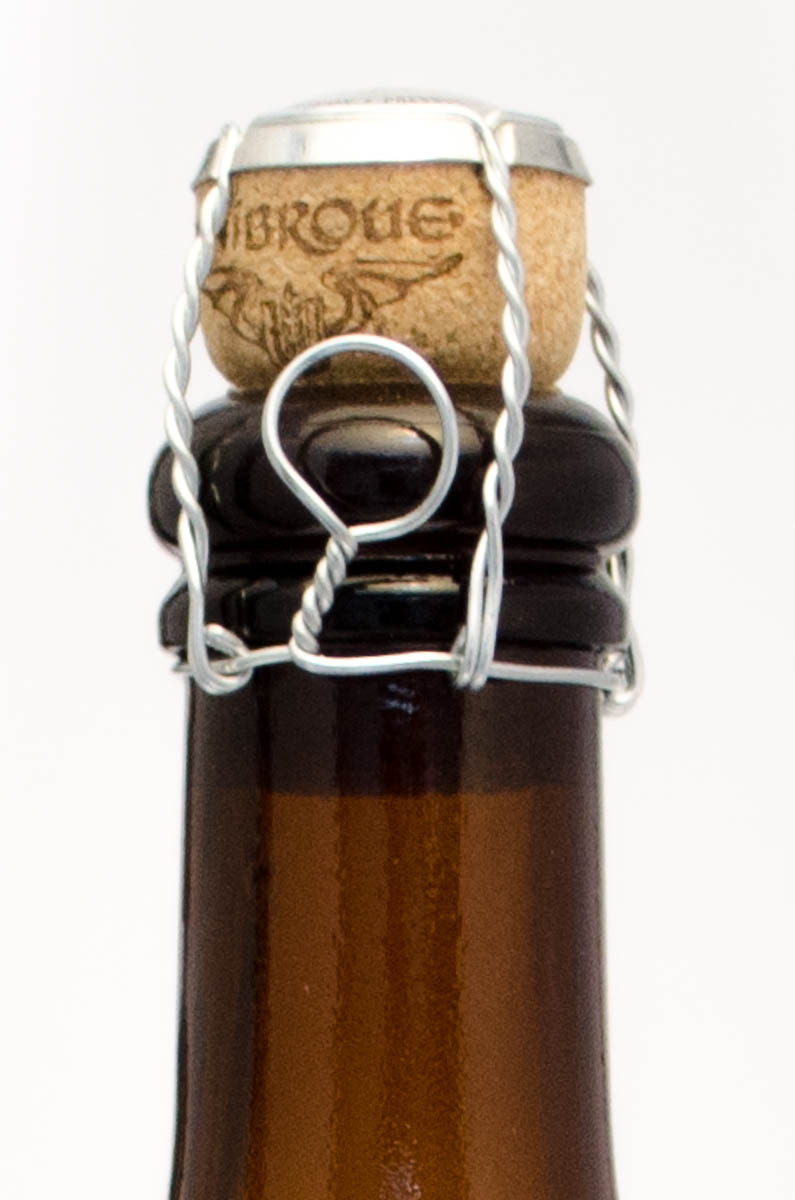
Cork and muselet closure atop a bottle of Unibroue beer, unopened

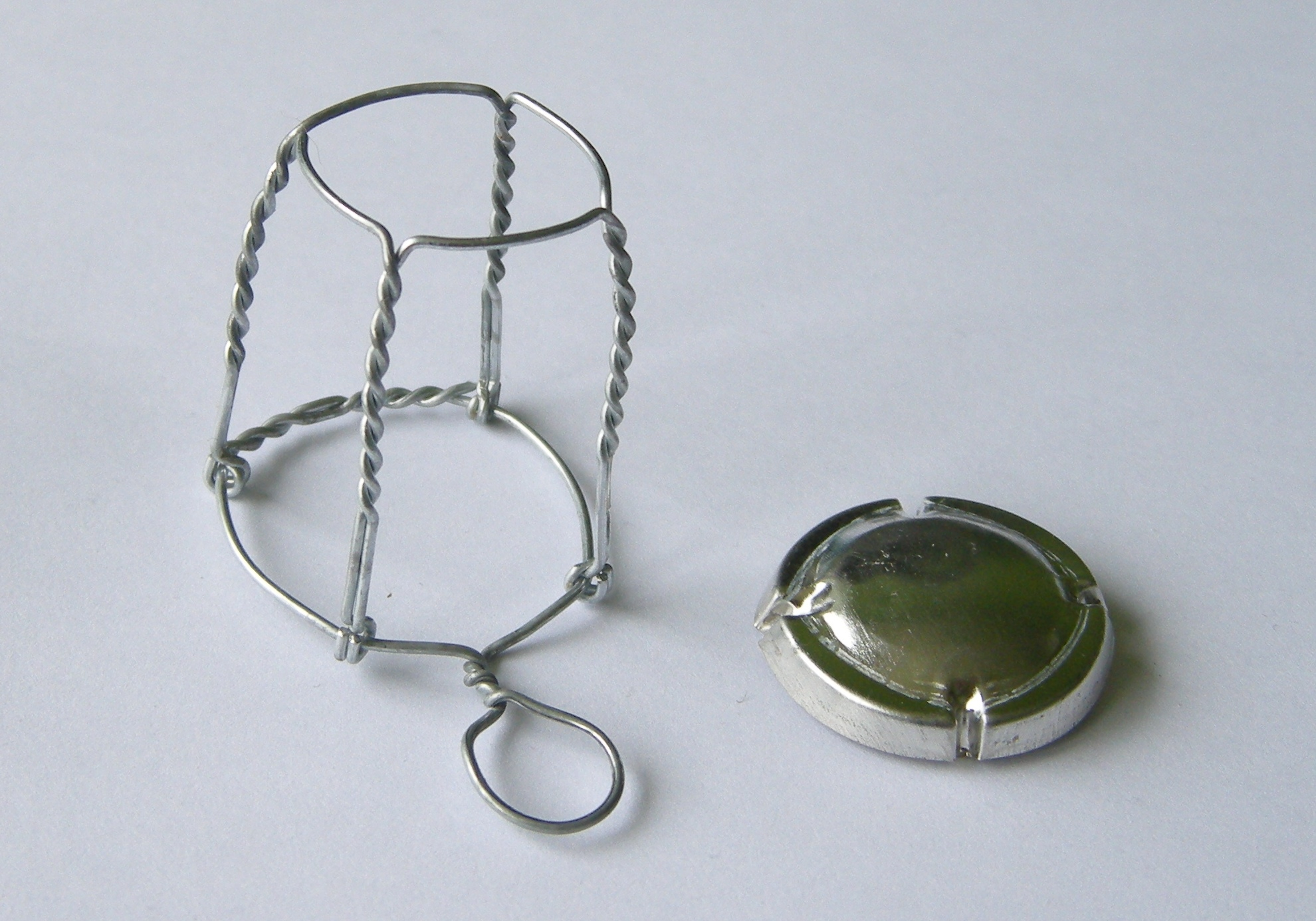
An opened muselet with cap

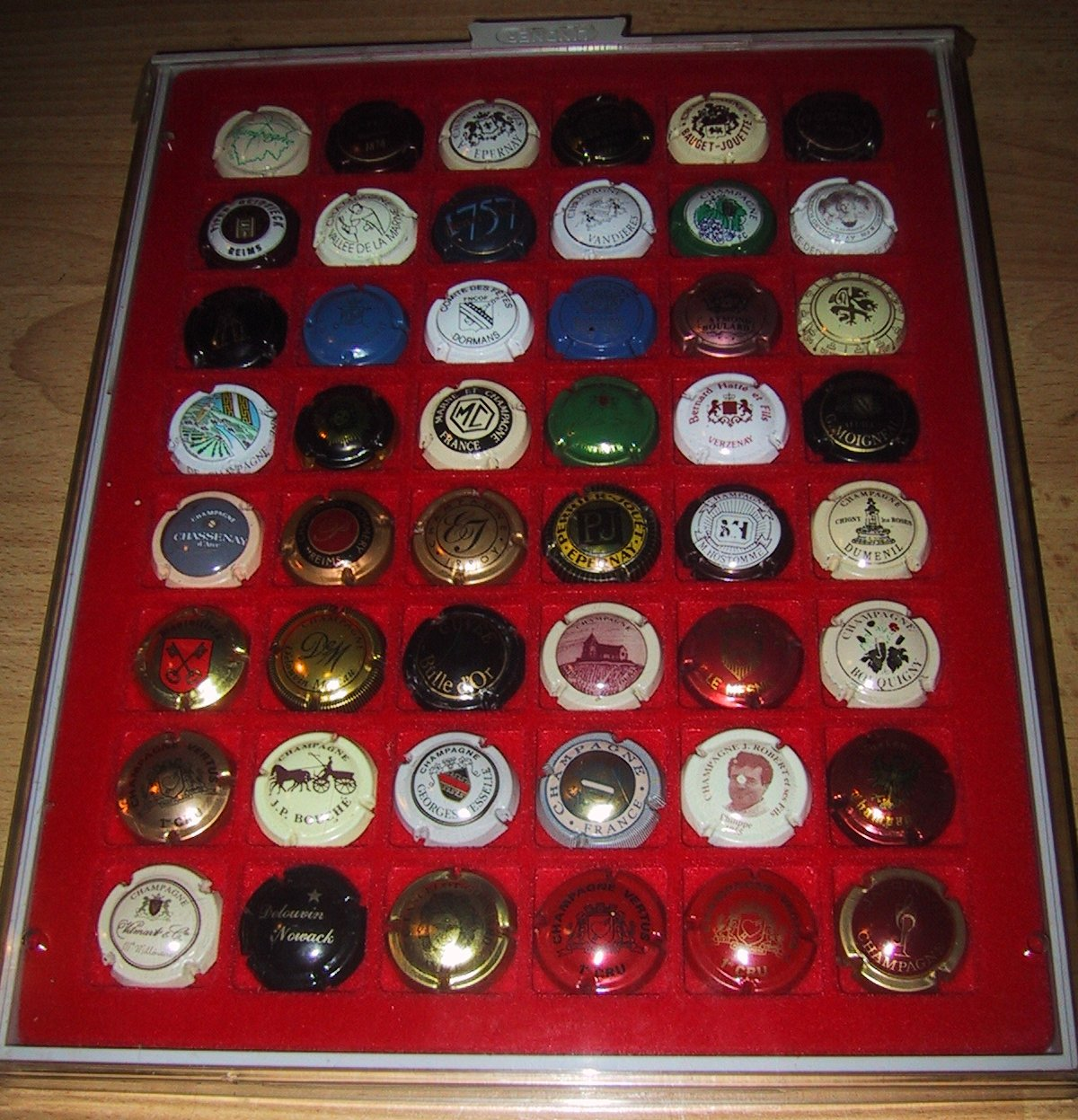
A collection of champagne muselet caps

A muselet (French: [myz.le]) is a wire cage that fits over the cork of a bottle of champagne, sparkling wine or beer to prevent the cork from emerging under the pressure of the carbonated contents. It derives its name from the French museler, to muzzle. The muselet often has a metal cap incorporated in the design which may show the drink maker's emblem. They are normally covered by a metal foil envelope. Muselets are also known as wirehoods or Champagne wires.

== History ==
When champagne was first produced the pressure of the sparkling wine was maintained by wooden plugs sealed with oil-cloth and wax. This method proved inconsistent either from leaking or blowing out of the stopper and a method of restraining the corks using cord was developed. In 1844, Adolphe Jacquesson invented the more secure method involving steel wire, however the early muselets were not easy to install and proved somewhat inconvenient to open. Further developments led to the modern muselet which is made of steel wire twisted to add strength and with a small loop of wire twisted into the lower ring which can be untwisted to release the pressure of the muselet and give access to the cork.

Cortellazzi (1952) of Marmirolo were the first to produce muselets (or wirehoods) in Italy, the brilliant idea of A. Jacquesson who resolved once and for all the problem of bottling sparkling wines: losing valuable effervescence through the cork. The Cortellazzi brothers (Otello and Evangelista), owners of an artisan shop that had started its business in iron making, the brothers later specialised in the manufacture of wirehoods for Spumante sparkling wine bottles thanks to their invention of the first machine that produces these components out of a single metal wire.

== Modern muselets ==
Traditionally, muselets require six half-turns to open.

Muselets are now machine-made in millions. A modern development has seen the production of personalized caps within the muselet, which display the emblems or name of the manufacturer. These may vary in colour and design from year to year and between different manufacturers. This has stimulated a market for the collection of these caps.
