= 2,4,6-Trichloroanisole =

Chemical primarily responsible for cork taint in wines (TCA)

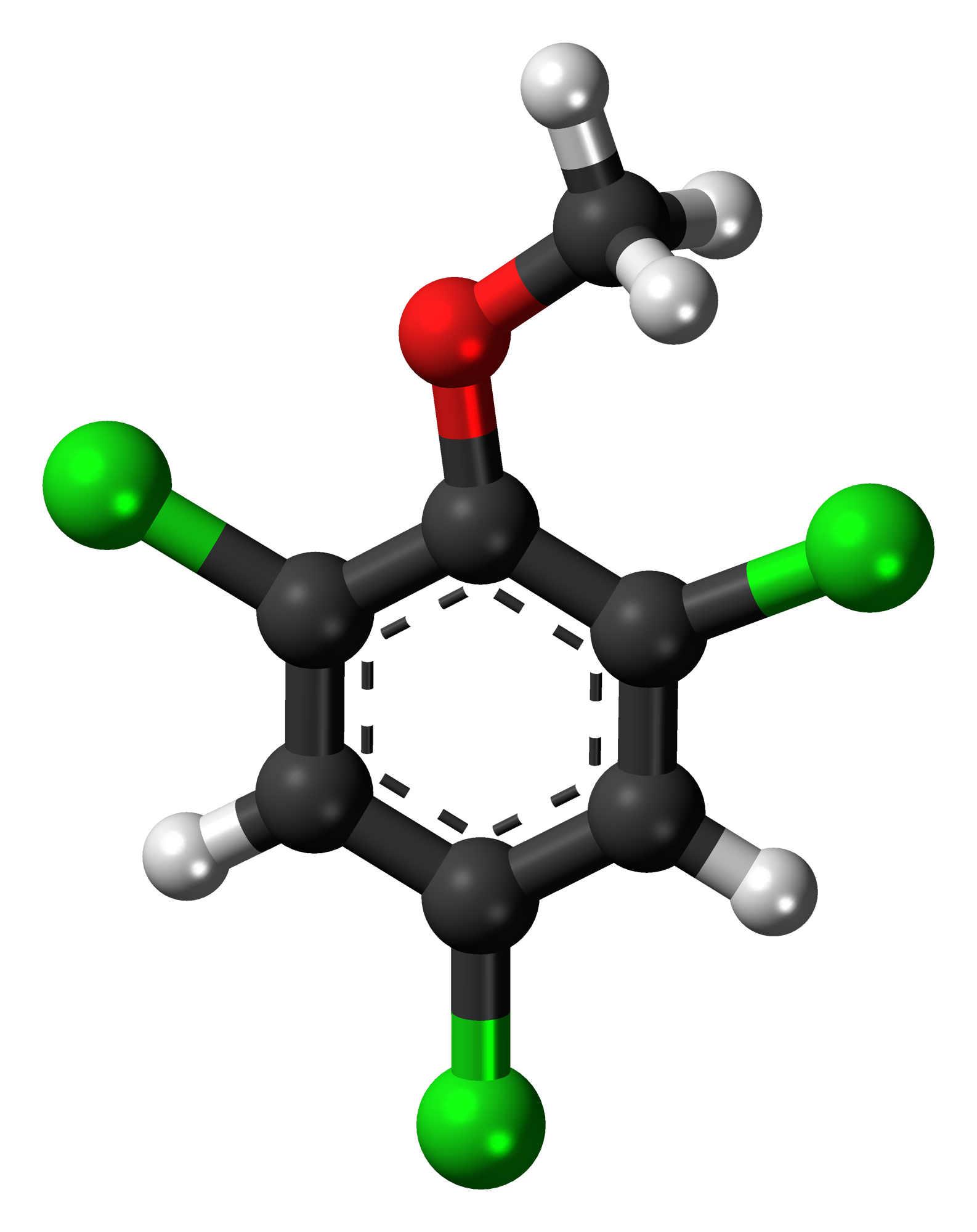

Names
- Preferred IUPAC name 1,3,5-Trichloro-2-methoxybenzene
- Other names 2,4,6-Trichloroanisole; TCA; 2,4,6-Trichloromethoxybenzene

Identifiers
CAS Number	87-40-1
3D model (JSmol)	Interactive image; Interactive image
ChEBI	CHEBI:19333
ChemSpider	6620
ECHA InfoCard	100.001.585
EC Number	201-743-5
KEGG	C11510
PubChem CID	6884
RTECS number	MFCD00000588
UNII	31O3X41254
CompTox Dashboard (EPA)	DTXSID9073886
- InChI: InChI=1S/C7H5Cl3O/c1-11-7-5(9)2-4(8)3-6(7)10/h2-3H,1H3 Key: WCVOGSZTONGSQY-UHFFFAOYSA-N; InChI=1/C7H5Cl3O/c1-11-7-5(9)2-4(8)3-6(7)10/h2-3H,1H3 Key: WCVOGSZTONGSQY-UHFFFAOYAT
- SMILES: COc1c(Cl)cc(Cl)cc1Cl; Clc1cc(Cl)cc(Cl)c1OC

Properties
Chemical formula	C_{7}H_{5}Cl_{3}O
Molar mass	211.47 g·mol^{−1}
Melting point	60 to 62 °C (140 to 144 °F; 333 to 335 K)
Boiling point	140 °C (284 °F; 413 K) at 28 Torr

Hazards
- GHS labelling
Pictograms	(GHS07: Exclamation mark)
Signal word	Warning
Hazard statements	H302, H319, H413
Precautionary statements	P264, P270, P273, P280, P301+P312, P305+P351+P338, P330, P337+P313, P501
- Except where otherwise noted, data are given for materials in their standard state (at 25 °C [77 °F], 100 kPa). verify (what is ?) Infobox references

2,4,6-Trichloroanisole (TCA) is an organic compound with the formula CH_{3}OC_{6}H_{2}Cl_{3}. It is one of several isomers of trichloroanisole. It is a colorless solid.

== Occurrence ==
2,4,6-Trichloroanisole represents one of the strongest of off-flavors, substances "generated naturally in foods/beverages [that considerably] deteriorate the quality" of such products. It is also a component of some drinking waters. It has also been detected in blood samples.

=== Wine ===
As of 2000, TCA was considered the primary chemical compound responsible for the phenomenon of cork taint in wines, and it has an unpleasant earthy, musty and moldy smell.

=== Coffee ===
TCA has also been suggested as cause of the "Rio defect" in coffees from Brazil and other parts of the world, which refers to a taste described as "medicinal, phenolic, or iodine-like". In investigation of the mechanism of its role in producing off-flavor effects, it was found to "attenuate olfactory transduction by suppressing cyclic nucleotide-gated channels, without evoking odorant responses."

== Formation ==
TCA is formed by the methylation of 2,4,6-trichlorophenol. More generally, it may be produced when naturally occurring airborne fungi and bacteria are presented with chlorinated phenolic compounds, which they then convert into chlorinated anisole derivatives. Species implicated include those of the genera Aspergillus, Penicillium, Actinomycetes, Botrytis (e.g. Botrytis cinerea), Rhizobium, or Streptomyces.

The chlorophenol precursor, 2,4,6-trichlorophenol, is used as a fungicide; more generally, related compounds can originate as contaminants found in some pesticides and wood preservatives, or as by-products of the chlorine bleaching process used to sterilize or bleach wood, paper, and other materials.

== See also ==
- 2,4,6-Tribromoanisole
