= Cork taint =

Wine fault due to aroma-intense compounds present in the cork

Chemical structure of 2,4,6-trichloroanisole (TCA), the compound primarily responsible for cork taint

Cork taint is a broad term referring to an off-odor and off-flavor wine fault arising from the presence in the cork of aroma-intense compounds that are transferred into wine after bottling.

Cork taint is characterized by a set of undesirable smells or tastes found in a bottle of wine, described as "musty", "mouldy", "earthy", or "mushroom". It causes losses to the industry (the estimated share of affected bottles is between 1% and 5%), and can destroy the reputation of a winery that is particularly unlucky (in rare cases up to a third of the bottles can be tainted). A wine found to be tainted on opening is said to be corked or "corky".

Not every contaminant in the cork is considered a "cork taint": for the issue to be classified as such, the problem should be caused by a compound introduced due to normal cork processing or forming in the cork naturally (for example, external naphthalene contamination during transportation is excluded). There are multiple sources of cork taint, but the 2,4,6-trichloroanisole (TCA) is by far most prevalent, with estimated 80-85% of all cork taints due to TCA. Occasionally, the same compounds found in the wine are not there due to the cork, but actually are introduced before bottling from the grapes, wooden barrels, and processing equipment.

== 2,4,6-Trichloroanisole (TCA) ==
The role of TCA in tainting the foodstuffs is known since at least 1970s. In 1982, Buser et al. identified TCA as a compound causing the cork taint. TCA is studied in detail and considered to be the main source of the issue (in some surveys, the TCA was present in all the bottles assessed to be tainted). Humans are very sensitive to the presence of TCA, with some experts capable of detecting the levels as low as 1-2 ng/L, and a specially trained group reported to achieve a threshold of 0.3 ng/L. Individual sensitivity greatly varies, with some experts' threshold at 250 ng/L, while some assessors unfamiliar with the TCA odors were able to detect the problem only at mg/L levels.

In side-by-side comparisons for white wines, one panel had shown preference for non-corked wines at the level of 20 ng/L of TCA, while another study found the "rejection threshold" to be between 3.1 and 3.7 ng/L.

== Precursor ==
The primary chemical precursor to TCA is 2,4,6-trichlorophenol (TCP). Bacteria are able to de-toxify TCP, notably Pseudomonas and Stenotrophomonas, but both strains cannot de-toxify the TCP without the other. Chlorinated phenols can form chemically when hypochlorous acid (HOCl, one of the active forms of chlorine) or chlorine radicals come in contact with wood (untreated, such as barrels or pallets). The use of chlorine or other halogen-based sanitizing agents is being phased out of the wine industry in favor of peroxide or peracetic acid preparations. While chlorine dioxide had shown no links to TCA formation, it was not efficient against yeasts in an in vivo study.

== Estimated occurrence and industry response ==
The cork-industry group APCOR cites a study showing a 0.7–1.2% taint rate. In a 2005 study of 2800 bottles tasted at the Wine Spectator blind-tasting facilities in Napa, California, 7% of the bottles were found to be tainted.

In 2013, the Cork Quality Council ran over 25 thousand tests. The results, compared with data from eight years before, showed a sharp reduction in TCA levels, of around 81 percent. In the last test, 90 percent of samples of natural cork stopper shipments showed values of under 1.0 ppt and only 7 percent showed results of 1.0–2.0 ppt.

Improvements in cork and winemaking methodology continue to strive to lower the incidence, but the media attention given to cork taint has created a controversy in the winemaking community, with traditional cork growers on one side and the makers of newer synthetic closures and screw caps on the other. Screw caps and synthetic corks, however, are thought to be prone to another aroma taint: sulphidisation. This may arise from the reduced oxygen supply which concentrates sulphurous smells arising from wines with universal preservatives, however it is more likely that these wines contain excessive/imbalanced amounts of sulphite based preservatives to begin with.

=== Systemic TCA ===
Systemic TCA tainting occurs when TCA has infiltrated a winery via means other than cork and can affect the entire production of wine instead of just a few bottles. This occurs when wine barrels, drain pipes, wooden beams in the cellars, or rubber hoses are tainted by TCA. Sometimes entire cellars have to be rebuilt in order to eliminate all potential systemic TCA culprits.

Rubber hoses or gaskets have a high affinity for TCA and therefore concentrate TCA from the atmosphere; wine or water that subsequently passes through infected hoses can become tainted with TCA. Another possible means of TCA contamination is through the use of bentonite, a swelling clay preparation (smectite) used in treating wine for heat stability; bentonite has a high affinity for TCA and will absorb TCA and related chemicals in the atmosphere, so if an open bag of bentonite is stored in an environment with a high (1–2 ng/g or ppb) TCA concentration, TCA will be absorbed in the bentonite and transferred to the wine lot to which the bentonite is added.

It is notable that this systemic TCA will often impart a trace (1–2 ng/L or ppt) to the wine, which itself is not detected by most consumers. However, with this high baseline level of TCA in bottled wine, even the additional contribution of a relatively clean cork can elevate the TCA level in the wine above threshold levels (4–6 ng/L or ppt), rendering the wine "corked".

Wine Spectator has reported that such California wineries as Pillar Rock Vineyard, Beaulieu Vineyard, and E & J Gallo Winery have had trouble with systemic TCA.

== Treatment ==
Filtration and purification systems now exist that attempt to remove the TCA from corked wine to make it drinkable again, though there are few means of reducing the level of TCA in tainted wine that are approved by the TTB (formerly BATF).

One method of removing TCA from tainted wine is to soak polyethylene (a plastic used for applications such as milk containers and plastic food wrap) in the affected wine; the non-polar TCA molecule has a high affinity for the polyethylene molecule, thereby removing the taint from the wine. The surface area of polyethylene needed to reduce the taint to sub-threshold levels is based on the TCA level in the affected wine, temperature, and the alcohol level of the wine.

Some vintners have used the so-called half and half mix of milk and cream to remove TCA from wine (the TCA in the wine is sequestered by the butterfat in half and half). The French company Embag markets a product called "Dream Taste", which uses a copolymer shaped like a cluster of grapes that is designed to remove the TCA taint from wine.

As advocated by Andrew Waterhouse, professor of wine chemistry at University of California, Davis, this can be done at home by pouring the wine into a bowl with a sheet of polyethylene plastic wrap; for ease of pouring, a pitcher, measuring cup, or decanter can be used instead, and the 2,4,6-trichloroanisole will stick to the plastic in a process effective within a few minutes.

== See also ==
- Alternative wine closure
- Flavor scalping
- Wine fault

== Sources ==
- Sefton, Mark A.; Simpson, Robert F. (2005). "Compounds causing cork taint and the factors affecting their transfer from natural cork closures to wine – a review". Australian Journal of Grape and Wine Research. 11 (2): 226–240. doi:10.1111/j.1755-0238.2005.tb00290.x. ISSN 1322-7130.
- Buser, Hans Rudolf; Zanier, Carla; Tanner, Hans (1982). "Identification of 2,4,6-trichloroanisole as a potent compound causing cork taint in wine". Journal of Agricultural and Food Chemistry. 30 (2): 359–362. Bibcode:1982JAFC...30..359B. doi:10.1021/jf00110a037. ISSN 0021-8561.
