= Trying to Get Arrested =

1909 American comedy short film

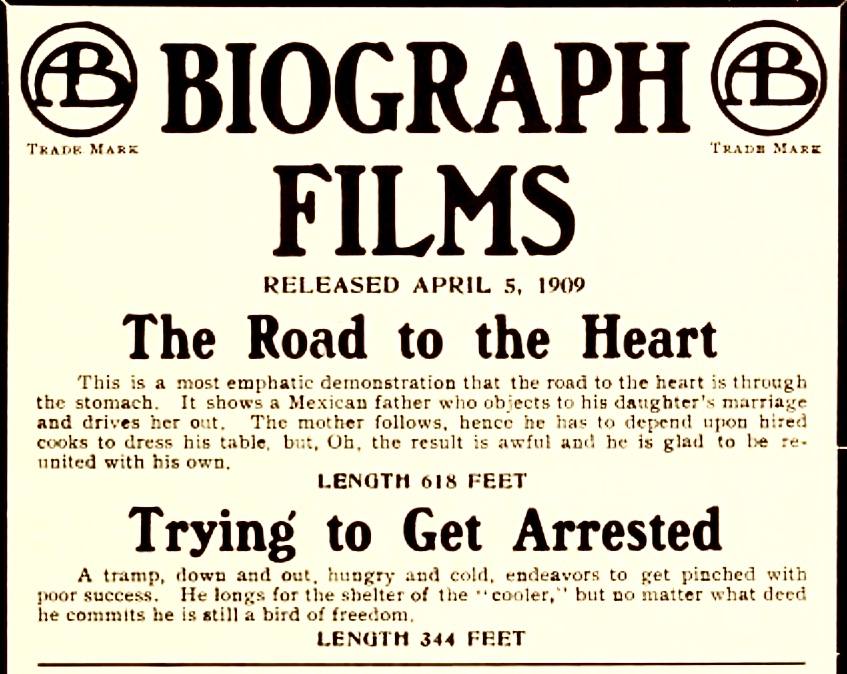
- Advertisement in The Moving Picture World for split-reel releases, 1909
- Directed by: D. W. Griffith
- Written by: D. W. Griffith; Mack Sennett
- Based on: The 1904 short story "The Cop and the Anthem" by O. Henry
- Produced by: American Mutoscope and Biograph Company; New York, N.Y.
- Cinematography: G. W. Bitzer; Arthur Marvin
- Distributed by: Biograph Company
- Release date: April 5, 1909
- Running time: 5-6 minutes (release length 344 feet) (Note: During the silent era, a "standard" 1000-foot reel could accommodate footage with a maximum running time of between 15 and 16 minutes. While projection speeds differed at various cinemas in the silent period, especially in the early years, films then, on average, were projected at 16 frames per second. That speed was much slower than the 24 frames of later sound films. See How Movies Work by Bruce F. Kawin (New York: Macmillan Publishing Company, 1987, pp. 46-47).)
- Country: United States
- Languages: Silent; English intertitles

Trying to Get Arrested is a 1909 American comedy short film directed by D. W. Griffith, produced by the Biograph Company of New York City, and starring John R. Cumpson. Filmed in two days in early 1909 at Palisades Park, New Jersey, it was released in April that year and distributed to theaters on a "split reel", which was a single film reel that included more than one motion picture. The other picture that accompanied this comedy was the Biograph "dramedy" The Road to the Heart. (Note: "Dramedy" is given as the genre of The Road to the Heart due to the varying descriptions and production designations given to the film in 1909 release schedules, advertisements in trade publications, and in theater bills published in newspapers throughout the country. Sometimes The Road to the Heart is cited as a drama or a "dramatic"; other times it is identified as a comedy.)

The screenplay or "scenario" for Trying to Get Arrested was inspired by and adapted from the short story "The Cop and the Anthem" written by American author William Sydney Porter, who is more commonly known by his pen name "O. Henry". Porter's short story was initially published in the New York World newspaper in December 1904 and republished in The Four Million, an anthology of O. Henry's works released in 1906, just three years before the production of this Biograph short.

== Plot ==
Various 1909 film-industry publications provide basic summaries of this photoplay's plot. The trade journal The Moving Picture World is one that describes the storyline in its April 3 issue:

TRYING TO GET ARRESTED.–Strange as it may seem the poor tramp, who is the hero of this Biograph comedy, finds it hard indeed to get pinched. There is no doubt he could have gotten work, but it is against the rules of his order. The cold weather is pretty trying and he wishes to get under cover, if it has to be in the "jug," so [he] commits most ignoble and lawless deeds, but without success. The police simply ignore him, and often arrest an unoffending person in his stead. He becomes guilty of theft, assault, riot, disorderly conduct, and, in fact, everything but murder, but is still a bird of freedom. It's no use, so despondently he makes his way to the woodyard, resolving to go to work, when a copper meets him at the gate and arrests him–just when he didn't want it.

Film reviewer H. A. Downey in The Nickelodeon, another widely read trade journal in 1909, provides in its May edition an even more concise summary of Griffith's comedy than the one found in The Moving Picture World. (Note: Based in Chicago, the trade journal The Nickelodeon was renamed Motography in 1911.) "A tramp commits different depredations", writes Downey, "with a view to having the hand of the law take care of him, but fails and decides to go to work." (Note: In Downey's very concise description of the film, he follows that description with "618", indicating the short's length. That is an error. The release length of Trying to Get Arrested was 344 feet; its companion on the split reel, The Road to the Heart, was 618 feet.)

Another summary of this short's plot, one that provides the most straightforward descriptions of scenes in the film, is in a more current reference, in the extensive 1985 publication Early Motion Pictures: The Paper Print Collection in the Library of Congress. The following was composed by Library of Congress staff after reviewing a roll of photographic prints preserved in the LC's collection. Those prints date from 1909 and were produced directly from Biograph's now-lost 35mm master negative of Trying to Get Arrested:

This story is about the many unsuccessful attempts of a tramp (John Cumpson) to get himself arrested and into jail. The first scene shows a man dressed in rags sitting on a park bench and attempting to keep warm. Several couples pass by but refuse him aid. The tramp vows to get shelter even it means jail, and he starts out by kicking a policeman. Instead of jailing him, the policeman holds him at arm's length and kicks him repeatedly. This begin a series of situations, each ending with the poor tramp being beaten or trod upon, but never arrested. The film ends as the tramp passes a construction site with a "Men Wanted" sign in front, and a policeman guides him unceremoniously toward the employment office.

Based on available summaries of the plot, both in period publications and in the cited LC reference, viewers of the film interpreted the short's ending in two entirely different ways. One way is the tramp, finally reconciled to getting a job, has his plan to work for a living ironically dashed when the police officer arrests him and escorts him to jail. The other interpretation views the officer as not arresting the tramp but escorting him to the construction site's employment office, insuring that the penniless man will get a job and not continue his original plan to get arrested.

== Cast ==
- John R. Cumpson as the tramp
- Anita Hendrie as the assaulted woman
- Florence Lawrence as a nanny
- Charles Inslee as the policeman
- Owen Moore as passerby
- Herbert Prior as tough guy
- Mack Sennett as tough guy
- Arthur V. Johnson as fugitive
- Robert Harron as fighter
- David Miles as fighter
- Marion Leonard, an extra
- Jeanie MacPherson, an extra

== Production ==
"He scorned the provisions made in the name of charity for the city's dependents. In Soapy's opinion the Law was more benign than Philanthropy...."

— O. Henry, "The Cop and the Anthem", 1904

As presented in Biograph's adaptation, O. Henry in his 1904 short story portrays the winter street life of a homeless man named "Soapy" and his repeated efforts to get arrested by committing assorted crimes just so he will be jailed on New York City's "Blackwell's Island". There he could at least have a warm bed, regular meals, and for a few months be "safe from the cold north wind".

For this screen version of O. Henry's work, director D. W. Griffith collaborated with Mack Sennett in writing the film's scenario. Griffith, however, chose to shoot the comedy in Palisades Park, New Jersey, a less congested area than the streets of New York. Palisades Park, which is located across the Hudson River from Manhattan, is about 13 miles north from where Biograph's headquarters and main studio were in 1909, situated inside a sprawling brownstone mansion at 11 East 14th Street in New York City. The actual filming of the comedy was done in two days–on January 13 and February 26–by Biograph cinematographers G. W. Bitzer and Arthur Marvin.

=== The short's "anonymous" actors ===
Compiling and verifying cast members in early Biograph productions such as Trying to Get Arrested is made more difficult by the fact that Biograph, as a matter of company policy, did not begin publicly crediting its performers and identifying them on screen, in film-industry publications, or in newspapers advertisements until four years after the release of this short. In its April 5, 1913 issue, the Chicago-based trade journal Motography in a news item titled "Biograph Identities Revealed" announces that "at last" Biograph "is ready to make known its players." That news item also informs filmgoers that for the price of ten cents they can purchase a poster from Biograph on which the names and respective portraits of 26 of the company's principal actors were featured.

The star of this short, John Cumpson, was one of many early Biograph players who performed anonymously for the studio. In fact, Cumpson died in March 1913, just the month before Biograph began to identify and actively promote its stars and publicly acknowledge their supporting cast members. Fortunately for Cumpson, he left the company in 1911 to join Edison Studios, where he received greater recognition and achieved some celebrity performing as the comedic character "Bumptious". Florence Lawrence, who performed as the nanny in this film, was known in 1909 to theater audiences only as the "Biograph Girl", although within a few years after this comedy's initial distribution, she would be widely publicized as one of the top screen actors in the United States.

== Release and reception ==
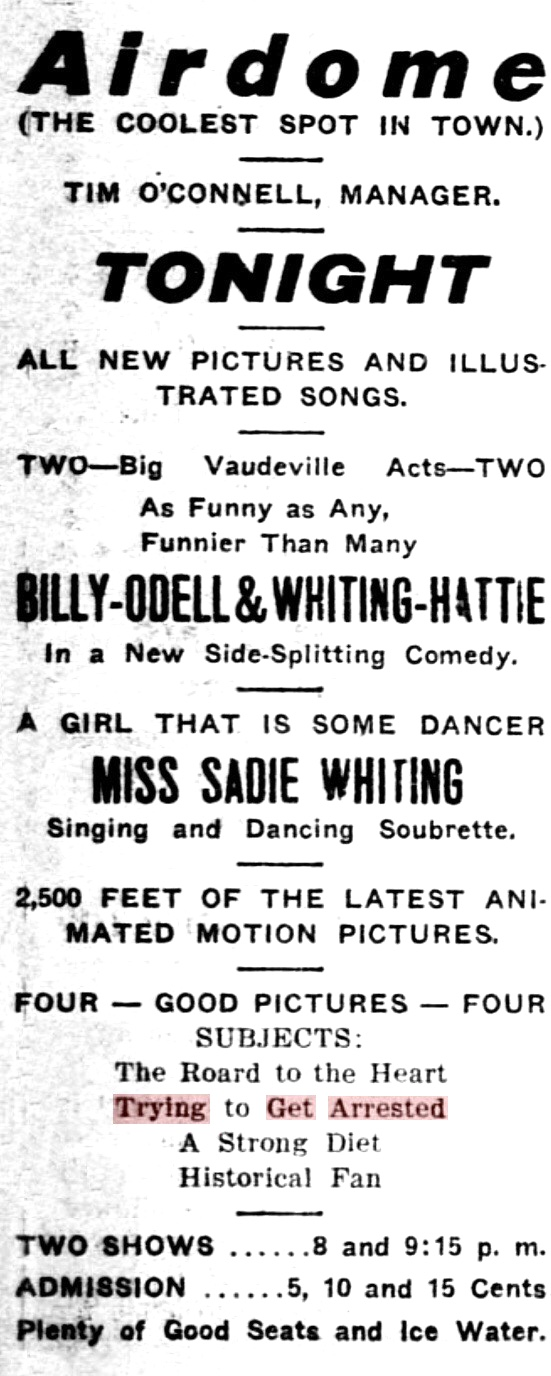
Newspaper ad for the film at open-air theater with "Good Seats and Ice Water", Palestine, Texas, July 1909

Given the brevity of this comedy, with a film length of just 344 feet and an original runtime of less than six minutes, Trying to Get Arrested was released and distributed by Biograph on a split-reel with the 618-foot drama The Road to the Heart. Few impartial reviews or comments about the film can be found in either 1909 trade publications or in city and small-town newspapers that year. A screen offering so brief would hardly warrant considerable treatments or critical assessments by either film-industry observers or theater owners.

Shortly after the film's release in April 1909, the Royal Theater in Bisbee, Arizona reported in the local newspaper an enthusiastic response to the motion picture by its audiences. "The farce comedy, 'Trying to Get Arrested'", stated the Royal's owner, "bringing more than its share of the applause, was well supported by the whole program." Elsewhere, in Carson City, Nevada, the Lake Theater promoted the short as "'Very Funny'", while the management of the Grand Theater in Brunswick, Georgia simply informed prospective patrons, "'Trying to Get Arrested' is a comic picture that has one of those funny chases in it." In at least one newspaper advertisement after its release, the short was erroneously and prominently billed as He Tries to Be Arrested. The Electric Theatre in Conway, Arkansas lists the film by that title in the promotion of its evening program on the front page of the May 20, 1909 issue of The Log Cabin Democrat.

== Preservation status ==
A visual record of Trying to Get Arrested does exist. The Library of Congress (LOC) holds a 121-foot roll of paper images printed frame-by-frame directly from the comedy's original 35mm master negative. Submitted by Biograph to the United States government shortly before the film's release, the roll is part of the original documentation required by federal authorities for motion-picture companies to obtain copyright protection for their productions.

While the library's rolls of paper prints are not projectable, such paper copies can be transferred onto modern safety film stock for screening. In fact, during the 1950s and early 1960s, Kemp R. Niver and other LOC staff restored more than 3,000 early paper rolls of film images from the library's collection and transferred them to safety stock. The UCLA Film and Television Archive, for example, has in its collection one such transfer, but not one of Trying to Get Arrested. Instead, the archive has a copy of the first film directed by D. W. Griffith, the short Adventures of Dollie. That projectable reproduction was created from a copy of the LOC's paper print of that 1908 film.

== See also ==
- D. W. Griffith filmography
