= The Four Million =

Collection of short stories by O. Henry

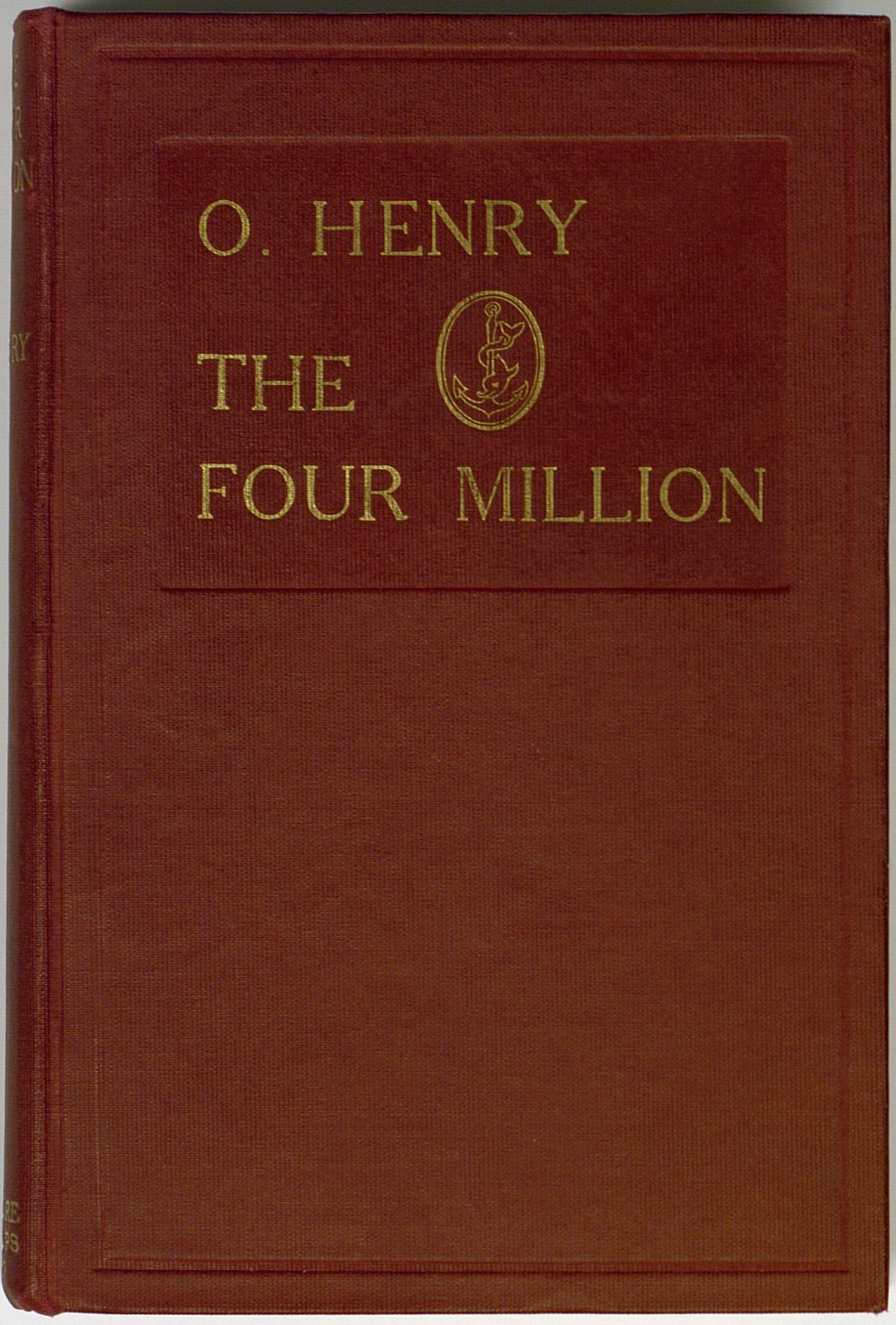
- Author: O. Henry
- Language: English
- Genre: Frame story, Short Stories
- Publisher: McClure, Phillips & Co., New York
- Publication date: April 10, 1906
- Publication place: United States
- Media type: Print (serial)
- Preceded by: Cabbages and Kings
- Followed by: The Trimmed Lamp

Mammon and the Archer
"Mammon and the Archer" from the collection The Four Million by O. Henry, read by Marian Brown

The Four Million is the second published collection of short stories by O. Henry originally released on April 10, 1906, by McClure, Phillips & Co. in New York. There are twenty-five stories of various lengths including several of his best known works such as "The Gift of the Magi" and "The Cop and the Anthem". The book's title refers to the then population of New York City where many of the stories are set. O. Henry was responding to a newspaper editorial by Ward McAllister, who claimed that there were only four hundred people in New York City worth knowing, by instead opining that every human being in New York is worthy of notice.

== Contents ==
- "Tobin's Palm"
- "The Gift of the Magi"
- "A Cosmopolite in a Cafe"
- "Between Rounds"
- "The Skylight Room"
- "A Service of Love"
- "The Coming-Out of Maggie"
- "Man About Town"
- "The Cop and the Anthem"
- "An Adjustment of Nature"
- "Memoirs of a Yellow Dog"
- "The Love-Philtre of Ikey Schoenstein"
- "Mammon and the Archer"
- "Springtime à la Carte"
- "The Green Door"
- "From the Cabby's Seat"
- "An Unfinished Story"
- "The Caliph, Cupid and the Clock"
- "Sisters of the Golden Circle"
- "The Romance of a Busy Broker"
- "After Twenty Years"
- "Lost on Dress Parade"
- "By Courier"
- "The Furnished Room"
- "The Brief Debut of Tildy"

1963 Airmont illustrated paperback edition.

== See also ==
- The Four Hundred (1892)
