= After Twenty Years =

Short story by O. Henry

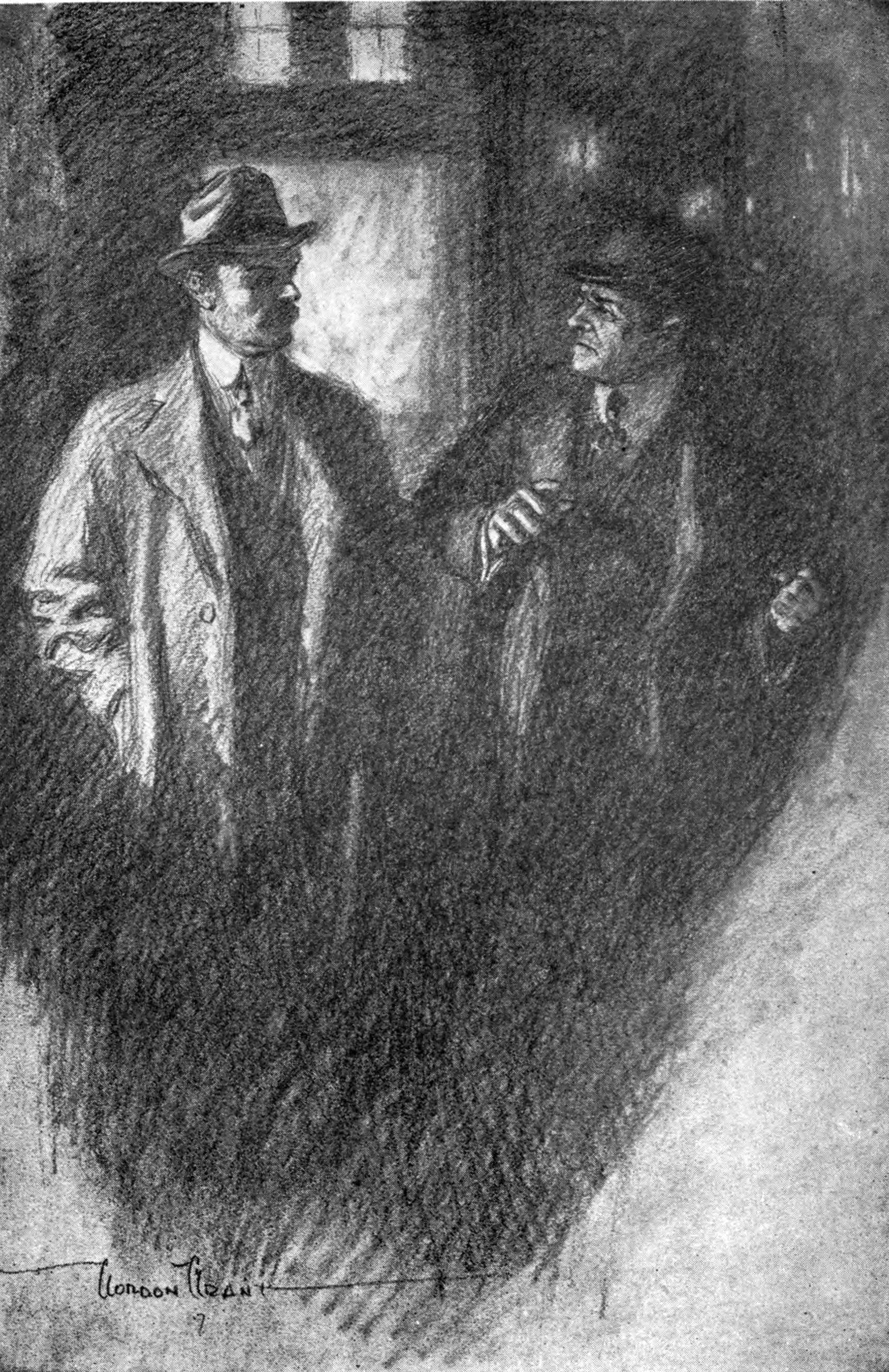
The man from the West stopped suddenly and released his arm. "You're not Jimmy Wells," he snapped ... Gordon Grant illustration for "After Twenty Years" in the 1917 memorial edition of O. Henry's work

"After Twenty Years" is a short story written by O. Henry, first published in his anthology, The Four Million in 1906.

== Summary ==
Jimmy Wells and Bob were raised in New York City and grew up as very close friends, just like brothers. As young adults, their paths diverged when Bob moved west to make his fortune and Jimmy stayed in New York. Before they parted, though, Bob and Jimmy agreed to meet in twenty years at the restaurant Big Joe Brady's where they last saw each other.

After twenty years have passed, Bob is waiting for Jimmy at the appointed spot. A policeman on patrol stops to question, and Bob tells the policeman his story. Bob boasts of how well he has fared and tells the policeman that he does not doubt that Jimmy will show up.

Later, "Jimmy Wells" arrives, and as they walk into a lighted area, Bob discovers that this is not the same Jimmy he knew, because twenty years cannot change a man's nose from Roman to Pug. The man reveals himself to be a plainclothes policeman who arrests “Silky” Bob, a wanted criminal. Before going to the police station, he gives Bob a letter from Jimmy. Bob reads it and realizes that the policeman he met earlier was in fact, Jimmy Wells. In the letter, Jimmy explains that when he arrived at the designated spot and realized that his old friend, Bob, was the criminal that the police were on the lookout for, he did not have the heart to arrest him, instead, he sent a plainclothes officer to do so.

== Media adaptations ==
- Syndicated series The O. Henry Playhouse (1956–57) adapted the story for one of their half-hour episodes. The adaptation has been released on a DVD collection of the show's episodes.
- The story was included in a 1987 audiotape collection O. Henry Favorites by the Listening Library of Old Greenwich, Connecticut.
- In 2001, it was one of five O. Henry stories included in the compact disc collection Classic American Short Stories, read by William Roberts.
- The story was adapted into a short film, titled Hands of Time (2021), produced & directed by Pranay Singh. The film stars Aditya Swami and Hardik Sabnis.
- This story was adapted for the stage by playwright Gerald P. Murphy and published in 2018 by Lazy Bee Scripts.

== See also ==
- "The Gift of the Magi"
- The Four Million
