= Roads of Destiny =

Roads of Destiny may refer to:

- Roads of Destiny (film), a 1921 American silent drama film
- Roads of Destiny (short story collection), a 1909 story collection by O. Henry
