= Soapy =

Soapy may refer to:

== Nickname ==
- Neil Castles (born 1934), retired NASCAR driver
- Jack Shapiro (1907-2001), American football player who played one game in the National Football League, becoming the shortest player ever in the league
- Soapy Smith (1860-1898), con artist, saloon and gambling house proprietor, gangster and crime boss of the American Old West
- Harry Vallence (1905-1991), Australian rules footballer
- G. Mennen Williams (1911-1988), 41st Governor of Michigan, Assistant Secretary of State for African Affairs under President John F. Kennedy and Chief Justice of the Michigan Supreme Court

== Fictional characters ==
- Soapy, the protagonist of the O. Henry short story "The Cop and the Anthem"
- Soapy Jones, a sidekick in 15 Western movies (1946-1948), played by Roscoe Ates
- Thomas "Soapy" Malloy, a minor character in four P. G. Wodehouse novels, starting with Sam the Sudden
- Soapy, a character in the 1938 film Angels with Dirty Faces, played by Billy Halop
- Soapy Soutar, a friend of Oor Wullie

== Other uses ==
- Soapy Awards, an award presented by Soap Opera Digest magazine from 1977 until 1983

== See also ==
- Samuel Wilberforce (1805-1873), English Anglican bishop known as "Soapy Sam"
- Soap opera, also known as a soapie
- Soupy Sales (1926-2009), American comedian born Milton Supman
