= Kim Myung-su =

South Korean poet born 1945()

Kim Myung-su (Korean: 김명수; born 1945) is a South Korean poet and writer who is famous for his short lyric poetry in simple language, demonstrating his intuitive insights into real objects. In his early works, he criticized Korean society through allegorical objects that embody our gloomy days and circumstances in a condensed manner. And later, many of his poems mainly related to nature and human beings.

== Life ==
Kim Myung-su was born in Andong, Gyeongsangbuk-do, in 1945. After graduating from National Railroad High School, he worked as a train inspector and observed passerby while working on the train. Gradually, he got interested in the lives of the poor, which eventually led him to study literature all by himself. Kim started to explore various literary genres, such as poetry, children's poetry, children's story, sijo, and then he published his first sijo, "Sonagi (소나기 The Shower)" in the newspaper during his military service. He moved to Germany to study German literature, but he came back to Korea in the middle of his studying due to his financial issues and physical condition. He officially debuted in 1977, by publishing three poems including "Wolsik (월식 Eclipse)" in Seoul Shinmun. Since then, he has regularly published his poetry collections at an interval of four or five years, and has also won multiple literary awards.

Kim's early poetry was systematically organized to reflect the grim reality of Korean society, in line with his activities as a member of a literary coterie, Bansi (Anti-poetry). Under the slogan of "poetry is life," the coterie drew heavily upon contemporary issues by not using conceptional terms but utilizing simple language. Kim Myung-su kept expressing his worries for social problems and joined several organizations as a member of the executive committee, such as in the Council of Writers for Freedom and Practice and the National Movement Headquarter for Democratic Constitution. Beyond poetry, he delved into different genres and wrote essays as well as literary criticisms, and he also translated German literature into Korean. He also got into Children's book, so he vigorously wrote several Children's collections. Kim brought out over 50 volumes of books, and Kim Myung-su Jeonjip (김명수 전집 The Complete Works of Kim Myung-su) in 10 volumes was published in 2014.

== Writing ==
The major characteristics permeating Kim's works are the refined poetic diction and adaptation of the simple lyric format. Kim Myung-su prefers employing unembellished language over excessive expressions in his poems. Furthermore, he enjoys writing lyrical verse that delivers compressed message along with precise language and concise lines, which constitute the major linguistic feature of his poetry: "pure, bright, and clear." His poetic style makes readers intuitively grasp the meaning of objects and features in his poems, in accordance with the intention of the writer.

=== Early works ===
Kim Myung-su's early works, including Wolsik (월식 Eclipse, 1980), Hageupban Gyogwaseo (하급반 교과서 A Textbook for Students with Bad Grades, 1983), and Piroechimgwa Simjang (피뢰침과 심장 The Lightning Rod and Heart, 1986), keenly criticize the dark reality by presenting one representative object. One of his major works, "A Textbook for Students with Bad Grades," Kim satirizes the standardized society under political oppression and the uncritical obeisance of the general public, as depicting the "parroting" habits of students with bad grades. In "Danchu (단추 The Button, 1980)", even a single button on the street is associated with fear from the military dictatorship. It conjures up the ringing sound at the other night, intertwined with an imagination of "the steps of black shoes." The poetry shows individuals under the military dictatorship undergoing fearful events, not allowed them to overlook trivial things.

=== Later works ===
The major theme of his later works shifts to nature and human existence with affection for every living thing. His work mainly shows sympathy for the marginalized and the awareness of the value of life. For example, in "Gogok (곡옥 Curved Jades, 2013)", each "curved jade" is a mere ornament attached to gold crowns, however, the brightness of the crown basically comes from the collection of curved jades. It is similar to the stars up in the sky, as one star might be dim but the cluster of stars can illuminate the whole night sky. Throughout his work, Kim Myung-su shed light on a hidden aspect of the object as well as unexpressed details. Kim's poetry has "power of intuition," because his work brings a new interpretation to readers by blurring the boundary between the familiar and the unfamiliar. Moreover, in "Namunnip Hwaseok (나뭇잎 화석 The Fossil Leaf, 2000)", a protagonist imagines life a few million years ago by watching a leaf, an object that agrees with the protagonist's life, as leaves on trees normally exist from spring to fall. The leaf is tiny, weak, and mortal, but it is an entity equated with the whole universe, as it supports stem, root, and tree to survive. In the same context, the protagonist's life becomes the universe itself.

== Works ==
His works include:

=== Complete collections ===
《김명수 전집》, 국학자료원, 2014 / Kim Myung-su Jeonjip (The Complete Works of Kim Myung-su), Kookhakjaryowon, 2014

=== Poetry collections ===
《월식》, 민음사, 1980 / Wolsik (Eclipse), Minumsa, 1980

《하급반 교과서》, 창비, 1983/ Hageupban Gyogwaseo (A Textbook for Students with Bad Grades), Changbi, 1983

《피뢰침과 심장》, 창작사, 1986 / Piroechimgwa Simjang (The Lightning Rod and Heart), Changjaksa, 1986

《침엽수 지대》, 창비, 1991 / Chimyeopsu Jidae (Coniferous Forests), Changbi, 1991《바다의 눈》, 창비, 1995 / Badaui Nun (The Eyes of Ocean), Changbi, 1995

《아기는 성이 없고》, 창비, 2000 / Agineun Seongi Eopgo (Baby Has No Name, Changbi, 2000

《가오리의 심해》, 실천문학사, 2004 / Gaoriui Simhae (Stringray's Deep Sea), Silcheon, 2004

《수자리의 노래》, 들꽃, 2005 / Sujariui Norae (The Song of Frontier Guards), Deulkkot, 2005

《곡옥》, 문지, 2013 / Gogok (Curved Jades), Moonji, 2013

《언제나 다가서는 질문같이》, 창비, 2018 / Eonjena Dagaseoneun Jilmungachi (Like the Questions I've Always Faced), Changbi, 2018

=== Children's poetry collections ===
《마지막 전철》, 바보새, 2008 / Majimak Jeoncheol (Last Subway), Babosae, 2008

《상어에게 말했어요》, 이가서 출판사, 2010 / Sangeoege Malhaesseoyo (I Talked to Shark), Igaseo, 2010

=== Children's book collections ===
《해바라기 피는 계절》, 창비, 1991/ Haebaragi Pineun Gyejeol (A Season for Sunflowers), Changbi, 1991

《달님과 다람쥐》, 우리교육, 1995 / Dallimgwa Daramjwi (Mr. Moon and the Squirrel), Uriedu, 1995

《엄마 닭은 엄마가 없어요》, 우리교육, 1997 / Eomma Dalgeun Eommaga Eopseoyo (Mama Hen Doesn't Have Mama), Uriedu, 1997

《바위 밑에서 온 나우리》, 계림북스쿨, 2001 / Bawi Miteseo On Nauri (Nauri: A Mystery Creature), Kyelimbooks, 2001

《새들의 시간》, 눈과 마음, 2001 / Saedeurui Sigan (Time for Birds), Nungwa Maeum, 2001

《마음이 커지는 이야기》, 푸른그림책, 2006 / Maeumi Keojineun Iyagi (Food for Heart), Pureungeurimchaek, 2006

《비행기 옛날 이름은 메뚜기였다》, 도서출판 바보새, 2008 / Bihaenggi Yennal Ireumeun Mettugiyeotda (An Airplane Was Once a Grasshopper), Babosae, 2008

《호랑이 꼬리낚시》, 도서출판 애풀트리테일즈, 2011 / Horangi Kkorinaksi (A Tiger's Tail-fishing), Appletreetales, 2011

《찬바람 부는 언덕》, 도서출판 현북스, 2015 / Chanbaram Buneun Eondeok (Windy Hills), Hyunbooks, 2015

=== Traditional children's book collections ===
《부여를 세운 해부루 왕》, 웅진출판사, 1989 / Buyeoreul Seun Haeburu Wang (Hae Buru of Dongbuyeo), Woongjinbooks, 1989

《반쪽이》, 웅진출판사, 1989 / Banjjogi (A Boy in Half), Woongjinbooks, 1989

《불개》, 웅진출판사, 1989 / Bulgae (A Fire Dog), Woongjinbooks, 1989

《동물들의 나이 자랑》, 웅진출판사, 1989 / Dongmuldeurui Nai Jarang (Who Is the Oldest?), Woongjinbooks, 1989

《토끼와 거북》, 웅진출판사, 1989 / Tokkiwa Geobuk (The Rabbit and the Turtle)

=== Essay collections ===
《솔아솔아푸른솔아》, 청맥, 1988 / Sorasorapureunsora (A Song for Pine Tree), Cheongmaek, 1988

《일각수의 꿈》, 예지각, 1990 / Ilgaksuui Kkum (Unicorn's Dream), Yejigak, 1990

《해는 무엇이 떠올려 주나》, 대정진, 1993 / Haeneun Mueosi Tteoollyeo Juna (Who Will Raise the Sun?), Daejeongjin, 1993

=== Literary criticism collections ===
《시대상황과 시의 논리》, 도서출판 세미, 2013 / Sidaesanghwanggwa Siui Nolli (Logic, Poetry, and Korean History), Semi, 2013

=== Compilation works ===
《금수강산 오랑캐꽃》, 청사출판사, 1988 / Geumsugangsan Orangkaekkot (Viola in Beautiful Land of Korea), Cheongsa, 1988

《하나가 된다는 것은 더욱 커지는 것입니다》, 세종출판공사, 1995 / Hanaga Doendaneun Geoseun Deouk Keojineun Geosimnida (Becoming One Means Getting Bigger), Sejong, 1995

《내 마음의 바다》1.2권, 엔터출판사, 1996 / Nae Maeumui Bada (The Sea in My Heart) vol. 1,2, Enter, 1996

=== Korean translations of foreign books ===
《빵당번》, 한스 벤더, 김명수 역, 소설문학, 1982.

《자유로 향하는 기차》, 넬리 데스, 김명수 역, 국민서관, 1982.

《나사.1-하반에서》, 한스 에리히 노샤크, 김명수 역, 소설문학, 1986.

Der tätowierte Hund, Paul Maar, Oetinger, 1968. / 《문신이 새겨진 개》, 파울 마, 김명수 역, 웅진출판사, 1986.

Indian Folk Art Painting Collections: The King and The Thief, S. Fischer Edition. / 《인도 민화집-왕과 도둑》, 독일 피셔출판사 판, 김명수 역, 샘터사, 1987.

Heine Poetry Collections-Political Poetry, Heinrich Heine. / 《하이네 시집-정치시》, 하이네, 김명수 역, 일월서각, 1987.

Deutsche Liebe, Müller, F. Max, W. Swan Sonnenschein, 1884. / 《독일인의 사랑》, 막스 뮐러, 김명수 역, 어문각, 1988.

Het Achterhuis, Anne Frank, Dagboekbrieven, 1947. / 《안네의 일기》, 안네 프랑크, 김명수 역, 어문각, 1988.

Unterm Rad, Hermann Hesse, S. Fischer, 1906. / 《수레 바퀴 밑에서》, 헤르만 헷세, 김명수 역, 어문각, 1988.

Unbekannte Erzählungen, Maxim Gorky, S. Fischer, 1989. / 《이웃들》, 막심 고리키, 김명수 역, 공동체출판사, 1993.

The Gift of the Magi, O. Henry, The Four Million, 1905. / 《크리스마스 이야기》, 오 헨리 외, 김명수 역, 공동체출판사, 1993.

Chinese Folk Art Painting Collections, S. Fischer Edition. / 《중국 민화집》, 독일 피셔 출판사 판, 김명수 역, 공동체출판사, 1994.

Indian Folk Art Painting Collections, S. Fischer Edition. / 《인도 민화집》, 독일 피셔 출판사 판, 김명수 역, 공동체출판사 판, 1994.

South American Folk Art Painting Collections, S. Fischer Edition. / 《남미 민화집》, 독일 피셔출판사 판, 김명수 역, 도서출판 작은 평화, 1995.

African Folk Art Painting Collections, S. Fischer Edition. / 《아프리카 민화집》, 독일 피셔출판사 판, 김명수 역, 도서출판 작은 평화, 1995.

British Folk Art Painting Collections, S. Fischer Edition. / 《영국 민화집》, 독일 피셔 출판사 판, 김명수 역, 도서출판 작은평화, 1995.

Icelandic Folk Art Painting Collections, S. Fischer Edition. / 《아이슬란드 민화집》, 독일 피셔출판사 판, 김명수 역, 도서출판 작은평화, 1995.

Rasmus und der Landstreicher, Astrid Lindgren, Oetinger, 1957. / 《하느님의 굴뚝새》, 아스트리드 린드그렌, 김명수 역, 도서출판 빛남, 1995.

The Witty Possum, S. Fischer Edition. / 《꾀 많은 주머니쥐》, 독일 피셔 출판사 판, 김명수 역, 도서출판 작은평화, 1995.

Szczur: Powiesc, Andrzej Zaniewski, Wydawn. Kopia, 1995. / 《쥐》, 앙드르제 자니위스키, 김명수 역, 고려원, 1995.

French Folk Art Painting Collections, S. Fischer Edition. / 《프랑스 민화집》, 독일 피셔 출판사 판, 김명수 역, 동광출판사, 1996.

Austrian Folk Art Painting Collections, S. Fischer Edition. / 《오스트리아 민화집》, 독일 피셔 출판사 판, 김명수 역, 동광출판사, 1996.

Turkish Folk Art Painting Collections, S. Fischer Edition. / 《터키 민화집》, 독일 피셔 출판사 판, 김명수 역, 동광출판사, 1996.

Emily, Michael Bedard, Doubleday Book, 1992. / 《에밀리》, 마이클 베다드, 바바라 쿤, 김명수 역, 도서출판비룡소, 1996.

Reinheit und Ekstase. Auf der Suche nach der vollkommenen Liebe, Luise Rinser, München, 1998. / 《당신의 순결에 대하여》, 루이제 린져, 김명수 역, 도서출판 현재, 2002.

=== Translations ===
Several of his works have been translated, including:

English, A GALAXY OF WHALE POEMS, Kim Myung-Su and 48 others. 2005, Kim Seong-Kon and Alec Gordon (〈Beyond the Memories〉)

Taiwan, 《바위 밑에서 온 나우리》, 계림북스쿨, 2001 / 《綠色羅水滴》, 新苗文化事業有限公司, 2005

Iran, 《Sleeping under the Peach Blossom》, 2017 (〈Eclipse〉, 〈Disrobing〉)

== Awards ==
He is a recipient of:

Today's Writer Award (1980) for Eclipse

Shin Dong-yup Prize for Literature (1984) for "The Lightning Rod and Heart"

Manhae Prize for Literature (1992) for Coniferous Forests

Korea Haeyang Literary Award (한국해양문학상, 1997) for The Eyes of Ocean

Changneung Literary Award (창릉문학상, 2015) for Curved Jades and The Complete Works of Kim Myung-su
