= Sanzhar Sultanov =

Kazakh-Canadian film director, producer and screenwriter

Sanzhar Sultan
- Born: December 7, 1988 (age 37); Korday, Kazakh SSR, Soviet Union
- Occupations: Film director, producer, screenwriter
- Years active: 2009–present

Sanzhar Sultan (born December 7, 1988, as Sanzhar Sultanov) is a Kazakh-Canadian film director, producer and screenwriter.

== Early life ==
Sultan was born in the small village of Korday, Kazakhstan. He grew up and studied in at Downside School in England and at Upper Canada College in Canada. In 2007, Sultan moved to New York City to study at the Lee Strasberg Theatre and Film Institute.

== Career ==
Sultan (back then as Sultanov) founded his own company, Reverson Entertainment, in 2009, with his brother Said. Sultan's first short film was Makes The Whole World Kin, an adaptation of the original short story by O. Henry, starring Paul Calderon. In 2010 he produced and directed his first feature film Burning Daylight starring Robert Knepper and Calderon in a supporting role. Sultan based the screenplay on three Jack London stories, while the film was set in 1920s New York City. The film premiered in Sonoma, California (Jack London's hometown) and in New York City's Webster Hall. It also received a wide theatrical release in Kazakhstan and was highly acclaimed by many critics.

In February 2013, Sultan partnered with Canadian venture capitalist and fellow Upper Canada College graduate Loudon Owen and opened up Know Rules Media. In September 2013, the company partnered with director/producer Akan Satayev and his studio SataiFilm, and started pre-production on Hacker. Brillstein Entertainment Partners executive produced. Sultan wrote the screenplay, from a story by Satayev and Timur Zhaksylykov. The film was financed by Timur Meirambekov, Zhanbolat Serikov and Kenges Rakishev on behalf of Mobli. The film had a limited release in the US (under the title "Anonymous"), on December 2, 2016. Following that, Sony Pictures released the film on home entertainment.

In 2016, Sultan was set to produce Business Ethics, starring Larenz Tate and directed by Nick Wernham. The film also starred Lance Reddick, Kurtwood Smith and Angus Macfadyen. Principal photography began in Toronto, Ontario in October 2016. The film won the Audience Choice Film Award at the 2019 Newark International Film Festival. The film was released on premium streaming on October 23, 2020.
