= Strictly Business (1962 film) =

- Directed by: Leonid Gaidai
- Screenplay by: Leonid Gaidai
- Based on: Stories by O. Henry
- Starring: Vladlen Paulus; Rostislav Plyatt; Yuri Nikulin; Georgy Vitsin; Sergei Tikhonov
- Cinematography: Konstantin Brovin
- Edited by: Alla Abramova
- Music by: Georgy Firtich
- Production company: Mosfilm
- Release date: 1962
- Running time: 79 minutes
- Country: Soviet Union
- Language: Russian

Strictly Business (Russian: Деловые люди, romanized: Delovye lyudi, literally "Industrious people") or also known as Businessmen is a 1962 Soviet black-and-white comedy-drama film directed by Leonid Gaidai. Its plot consists of three unrelated novellas based on short stories by O. Henry: "The Roads We Take", "Makes the Whole World Kin", and "The Ransom of Red Chief".

The film's title is borrowed from the book of short stories by O. Henry titled Strictly Business (1910, Деловые люди in Russian translation), but none of the short stories it includes were adapted for the screen.

== Cast ==
"The Roads We Take" (Дороги, которые мы выбираем)

- Vladlen Paulus as "Shark" Dodson (voiced by Oleg Dal)
- Aleksandr Shvorin as Bob Tidball
- Viktor Gromov as Mr Williams
- Vladimir Pitsek as machinist (uncredited)
- Viktor Uralsky as fireman (uncredited)
- Lev Lobov as conductor of the coach (uncredited)
- Yuri Chulyukin as Peabody, clerk (uncredited)

"Makes the Whole World Kin" (Родственные души)

- Rostislav Plyatt as landlord
- Yuri Nikulin as thief

"The Ransom of Red Chief" (Вождь краснокожих)

- Georgy Vitsin as Sam, adventurer
- Aleksei Smirnov as Bill Driscoll
- Sergei Tikhonov as Johnny Dorset (voiced by Margarita Korabelnikova, in some scenes speaks in his own voice)
- Georgy Millyar as Ebenezer Dorset, Johnny's father (uncredited)
- Yevgeny Yevstigneyev as citizen (voice, uncredited)

== Sources ==
- Delovye lyudi at IMDb
- Delovye lyudi (Business People) at Rotten Tomatoes
- Strictly Business (1962) (English subtitles)
- Деловые люди
