= O. Henry House =

O. Henry House refers to two homes which the author, William Sydney Porter, better known as O. Henry lived. Both of these homes are located in Texas.

In Austin, Texas

- William Sidney Porter House

In San Antonio, Texas

- O. Henry House Museum (San Antonio)
