= The Furnished Room =

1904 short story by O. Henry

- Short story by O. Henry

Text available at Wikisource
- Country: United States
- Language: English

Publication
- Published in: New York World
- Publication type: Newspaper
- Publication date: August 14, 1904

"The Furnished Room" is a short story by American writer O. Henry. It was first published in the New York World on August 14, 1904, and was collected two years later in The Four Million.

Set among the transient lodgers of New York City's Lower West Side, the story follows an unnamed young man's search for Eloise Vashner, a woman who has disappeared in the city. Its ending uses the kind of reversal associated with O. Henry, but the story's sustained atmosphere and double suicide have led critics to describe it as unusually bleak for his fiction. Scholarly readings have emphasized the personification of the rented room, the story's Gothic elements, and its treatment of urban transience, poverty, and commercial self-interest.

== Background and publication ==
O. Henry moved to New York City in 1902. In December 1903 he entered an agreement to supply the New York World with one short story each week for $100 per story. E. Hudson Long, an early biographer and critic of O. Henry, described the stories produced during this period as products of the writer's immersion in the city's environment. "The Furnished Room" appeared in the newspaper on August 14, 1904.

McClure, Phillips & Co. included the story in O. Henry's second collection, The Four Million, in 1906. It is the twenty-fourth of the book's 25 stories. The collection's title refers to New York's population and counters the idea, associated with socialite Ward McAllister, that only the city's socially prominent "Four Hundred" were worth noticing. Long regarded the collection as the book that established O. Henry's reputation as a chronicler of New York.

The story continued to be anthologized after O. Henry's death. C. Alphonso Smith selected it for his 1922 volume Selected Stories from O. Henry and supplied an introductory critical note. In September 1925, Weird Tales reprinted it as the third entry in the magazine's "Weird Story Reprints" series, under the teaser "Just a Whiff of Mignonette Was the Ghost in This Story".

== Plot ==
The narrator introduces the "red brick district" of the Lower West Side, whose population moves continually between furnished rooms. The houses have held so many temporary residents, the narrator suggests, that they should contain the traces and perhaps the ghosts of former tenants. One evening, an unnamed young man goes from house to house looking for a room. At the twelfth house, a housekeeper named Mrs. Purdy shows him a decaying third-floor room that has been vacant for one week.

The young man pays a week's rent in advance and asks Mrs. Purdy whether a former lodger was named Eloise Vashner. He describes Eloise as a slender, fair young woman with reddish-gold hair and a dark mole near her left eyebrow, adding that she would probably be singing on the stage. Mrs. Purdy says that she does not remember where exactly. The young man has spent five months questioning theatrical managers, agents, schools, choruses, and theater audiences in the belief that Eloise remains somewhere in New York.

Alone in the room, he studies the damage and discarded objects left by its many occupants. Worn flooring, fingerprints, stains, a name scratched into a mirror, and broken furniture appear to record their frustrated lives. The room suddenly fills with the scent of mignonette, the perfume associated with Eloise. Convinced that she has been there, the young man searches the furniture, drawers, curtains, walls, and floor for a recognizable possession. He finds only anonymous objects left by other tenants. He questions Mrs. Purdy again, but she says that the recent occupants were performers called Sprowls and Mooney and describes earlier tenants without mentioning Eloise.

When the young man returns upstairs, the perfume has disappeared. He seals the door and windows with strips torn from the bedsheets, extinguishes the gaslight, turns the gas on again, and lies on the bed. Two hours later, Mrs. Purdy tells another housekeeper, Mrs. McCool, that she has rented the room. Their conversation reveals that Mrs. Purdy concealed a suicide there one week earlier because disclosure might deter tenants. Mrs. McCool recalls that the dead woman was pretty except for a mole beside her left eyebrow, identifying her as Eloise.

== Style and themes ==
=== The room as a character ===
The furnished room is described through sustained personification. It gives its new tenant a false welcome, attempts to tell him about its former occupants, becomes momentarily alive with Eloise's perfume, and is "dead" when the scent leaves. Long wrote that the room is more prominent than the human characters and exercises a pervasive influence over them. Smith similarly called the room "one of the characters in the story" and praised the narrative's unity, convergence of detail, prose style, and structural craftsmanship.

The marks and cast-off objects in the room also function as evidence of lives that the city otherwise leaves unrecorded. Mauricio D. Aguilera Linde interprets the young man's search as a kind of archaeological reading: each damaged object or abandoned possession becomes a sign of previous tenants' hopes, suffering, and anger. The room therefore preserves collective traces but withholds the one piece of information that could save its latest occupant.

=== Urban transience and commercial self-interest ===
The opening describes the Lower West Side’s lodgers as moving from one furnished room to another with few possessions. Water imagery presents New York as unstable and engulfing. The city is compared to quicksand, while the residents' possessions are described as flotsam and the tenants as castaways. Aguilera Linde connects these images, as well as the decaying stair carpet and Mrs. Purdy's comparison to a worm, to contemporary Darwinian and geological language. In this reading, the building becomes a burial place for people unable to survive the city's social conditions.

=== Gothic elements and the ending ===
Although the plot retains O. Henry's characteristic coincidence and surprise ending, its tone is largely without his usual humor. Aguilera Linde places the story in the American haunted-house tradition: the old lodging house has a troubled history, carries the presence of the dead, and acts as an antagonist, but it is also tied to questions of class and economic survival. The gradual decomposition of the building replaces the spectacular destruction found in some Gothic tales.

== Critical reception ==
Early assessments often treated "The Furnished Room" as one of O. Henry's strongest serious stories. In an essay first published in 1916 and reprinted in 1919, Stephen Leacock presented it as an example of O. Henry at his best as a writer of pathos and praised the economy of its narration. Smith went further in 1922, calling it O. Henry's greatest story while acknowledging that its lack of humor made it unrepresentative of much of his work.

The ending has also drawn influential criticism. In Understanding Fiction, first published in 1943, Cleanth Brooks and Robert Penn Warren argued that the revelation depends on a contrived coincidence rather than adequately developed character and motivation, treating the reversal as a trick without sufficient fictional meaning. Literary scholar Robert M. Dowling later summarized their critique as a charge that O. Henry used surprise to conceal artistic shortcomings.

Later scholarship has emphasized features beyond the reversal. Aguilera Linde notes the story's exceptional bleakness and the disappearance of O. Henry's characteristic comic tone, while treating its Gothic setting and evolutionary imagery as a critique of social and economic conditions in the Progressive Era.

== Adaptations ==
The story was adapted as the 1917 American silent short film The Furnished Room. The 22-minute film was directed by Thomas R. Mills and starred Agnes Ayres and J. Frank Glendon.

Gerry Alanguilan adapted and illustrated the story for O. Henry, the eleventh volume of the comics anthology series Graphic Classics, published by Eureka Productions in 2005.

Composer Daniel Steven Crafts wrote The Furnished Room, a 90-minute opera in one long act with a libretto by Richard Kuss. It is scored for eight principal singers, a boy soprano, and a medium-sized orchestra.
