= Waifs and Strays =

Short story collection by O. Henry

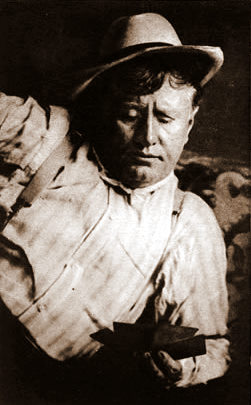
- O. Henry, from the frontispiece of Waifs and Strays (1917)
- Author: O. Henry
- Language: English
- Genre: Short story collection
- Publisher: Doubleday, Page & Company
- Publication date: 1917
- Publication place: United States

Waifs and Strays is a short story collection by O. Henry, released posthumously in 1917. It was published by Doubleday, Page & Company.

== Contents ==
- "The Red Roses of Tonia"
- "Round The Circle"
- "The Rubber Plant's Story"
- "Out of Nazareth"
- "Confessions of a Humorist"
- "The Sparrows in Madison Square"
- "Hearts and Hands"
- "The Cactus"
- "The Detective Detector"
- "The Dog and the Playlet"
- "A Little Talk About Mobs"
- "The Snow Man"
