= The Ransom of Red Chief =

1907 short story by O. Henry

- Short story by O. Henry
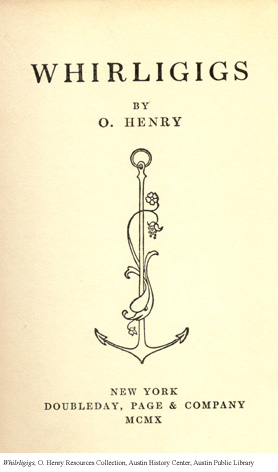
- The Ransom of Red Chief
- Country: United States
- Language: English
- Genre: Short story

Publication
- Published in: Whirligigs
- Publisher: Doubleday, Page
- Publication date: 1907

"The Ransom of Red Chief" is a short story by O. Henry first published in the July 6, 1907 issue of The Saturday Evening Post. It follows two men who kidnap and demand a ransom for a wealthy man's son. Eventually, the men are overwhelmed by the boy's spoiled and hyperactive behavior, so they pay his father to take him back.

The story and its main idea have become a part of popular culture, with many children's television programs depicting versions of the story as one of their episodes. It has often been used as a classic example of two ultimate comic ironies: a hostage actually liking his abductors and enjoying being captured, and his captors having the tables turned on them and being compelled to pay to be rid of him.

== Summary ==
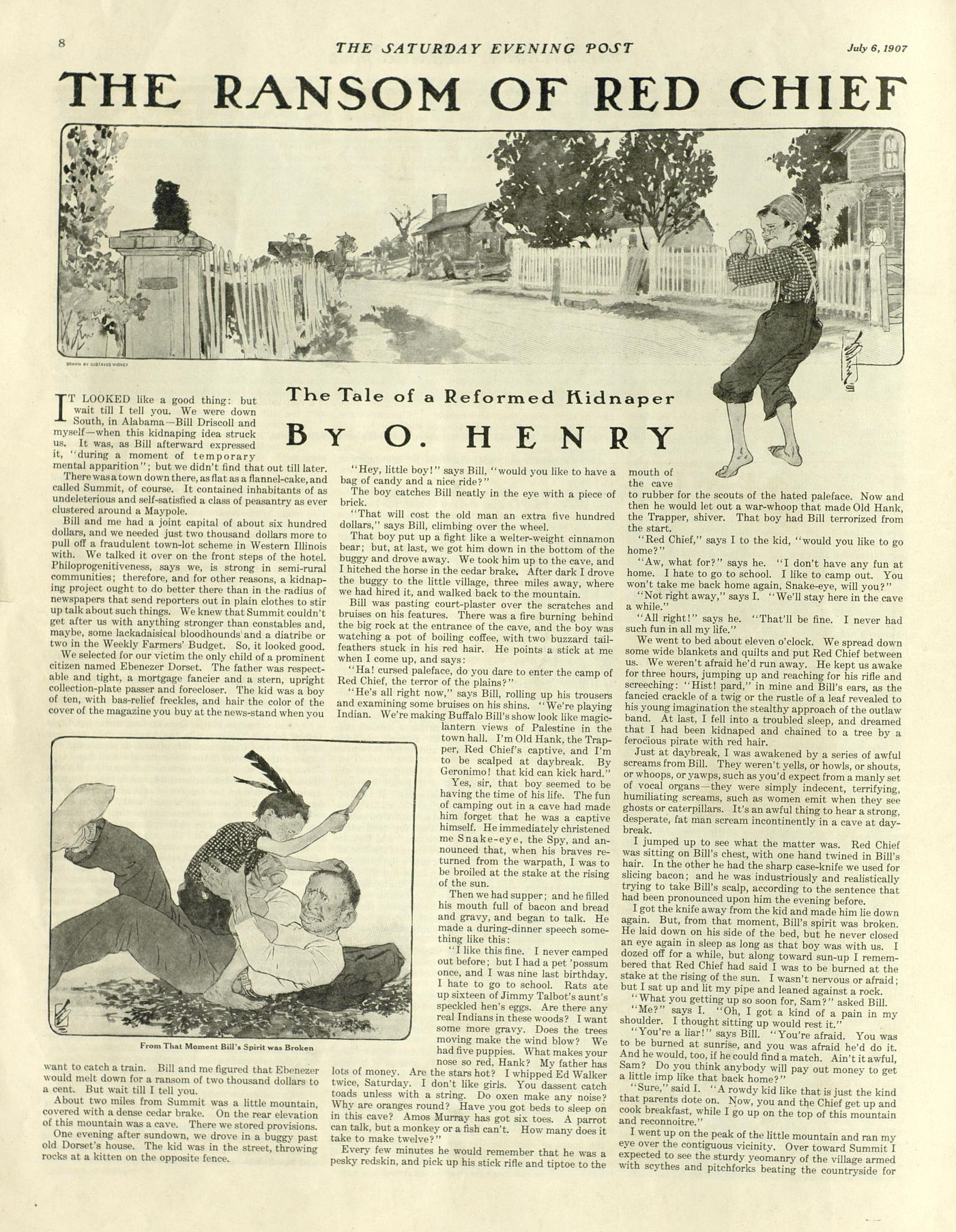
First appearance in The Saturday Evening Post.

The story takes place in the south of Alabama where two small-time criminals, Bill Driscoll and Sam Howard, kidnap a boy named Johnny, the red-haired son of Ebenezer Dorset, an important citizen, and hold him for ransom. But the moment that they arrive at their hideout with the boy, the plan begins to unravel, as Johnny actually starts to enjoy his kidnappers. Calling himself "Red Chief", Johnny proceeds to drive his captors to distraction with his unrelenting chatter, malicious pranks, and demands that they play wearying games with him, such as riding 90 miles (140 km) on Bill's back pretending to be an Indian scout.

The criminals write a ransom letter to the boy's father, lowering the ransom from $2,000 to $1,500, believing that the father will not pay much money for his return. The father, who knows his son well and realizes how intolerable he will be to his captors and how eager they will soon be to rid themselves of the delinquent child, rejects their demand and offers to take the boy off their hands if they pay him $250 (equivalent to $8,600 in 2025). The men hand over the money and the howling boy – who had actually been happier being away from his strict father – and flee while the father restrains his son from following them.

== Influence ==
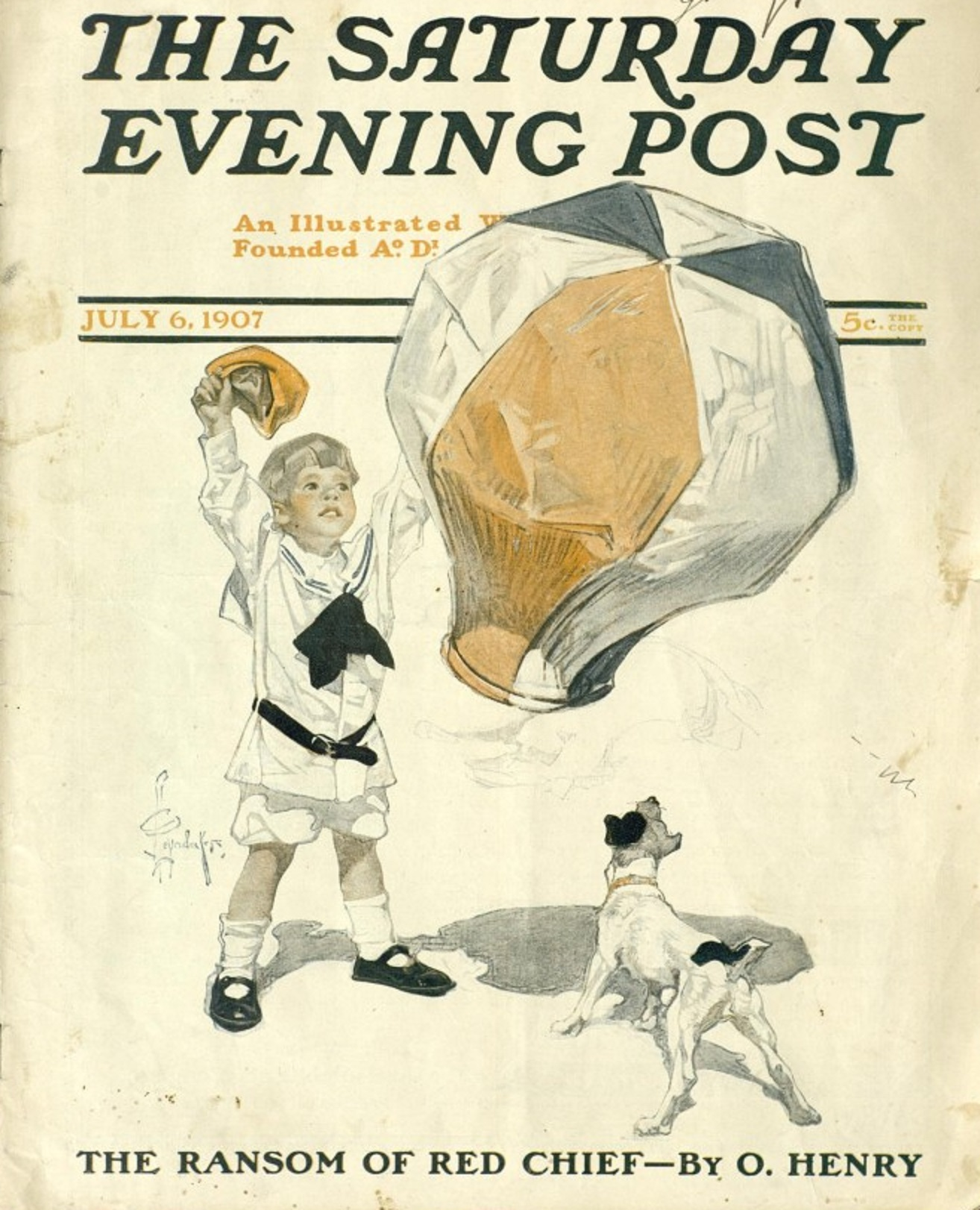
First published in The Saturday Evening Post.

"The Ransom of Red Chief" has been adapted many times, directly and indirectly. Direct adaptations include the 1952 movie The Ransom of Red Chief starring Fred Allen and Oscar Levant (part of O. Henry's Full House), the segment "The Ransom of Red Chief" in the 1962 Soviet black-and-white comedy film Strictly Business by Leonid Gaidai, the 1977 "The Ransom of Red Chief" episode of the ABC Weekend Special series, the "Cornelius and Alphonse/The Choice" episode of Fantasy Island, the 1984 opera Ransom of Red Chief (libretto, music, and orchestration by Brad Liebl), and the 1998 television film The Ransom of Red Chief; there is also Le Grand Chef, a French direct adaptation made in 1959 by Henri Verneuil, with Fernandel and Gino Cervi.

Indirect adaptions include the 1929 Japanese silent comedy Straightforward Boy by Yasujirō Ozu, the British film Don't Ever Leave Me (1949) played with a girl instead, with Petula Clark in the role, an episode of Rugrats titled "Ruthless Tommy" where Tommy is mistaken for the child of "Ronald Thump", the episode "The Ransom of Red Chimp" of the 1990s Disney animated series TaleSpin, the 1985 Soviet animated short Imp with a Fluffy Tail, the films Too Many Crooks (1959) and Ruthless People (1986) (which take the story a step further), and "The Ransom of Rusty Rex", a segment of the 2015 anthology film Tales of Halloween. A 2015 episode of the radio comedy anthology Stanley Baxter's Playhouse, titled "Two Desperate Men" after how the kidnappers sign their note, relocated the story to rural Scotland in the 1930s.
