= Business Ethics (film) =

- Official Poster IMDb
- Directed by: Nick Wernham
- Written by: Richard Wernham
- Produced by: Sanzhar Sultan
- Starring: Larenz Tate; Sarah Carter; Kurtwood Smith; Lance Reddick; Gil Bellows; Jessica Parker Kennedy; Julian Richings; Angus Macfadyen; Carolina Bartczak
- Cinematography: Michael LeBlanc
- Edited by: Liza D. Espinas
- Music by: Patric Caird
- Production companies: Innis Lake Entertainment; Skylight Picture Works
- Distributed by: Fisher Park Media; TateMen Entertainment
- Release date: 2019
- Country: Canada
- Language: English
- Budget: $3,000,000

Business Ethics is a 2019 Canadian dark comedy-tragedy drama film about a young, ambitious businessman who gradually loses his friends - and his soul - as he tries to keep his elaborate Ponzi scheme afloat with acts of fraud and deception. Directed by Nick Wernham, the film features Larenz Tate as main character Zachery Cranston, with Sarah Carter, Julian Richings, Lance Reddick and Kurtwood Smith. Gil Bellows, who starred in a short film adaptation of the same name, stars and executive produces. The film was released during the 2020 COVID-19 pandemic.

== Plot ==
The film opens with a flashback of a young Zachery Cranston, a commerce student who questions the ethics of illegal business practices. Fast forward to the present, Zachery is now a successful but morally bankrupt hedge fund manager, contemplating suicide as his life spirals out of control.

The story retraces Zachery’s journey, beginning with his childhood in the 1980s. Influenced by his unscrupulous stepfather, Edwin Murk, Zachery adopts a corrupt business philosophy. After Murk is arrested for running a Ponzi scheme, Zachery follows in his footsteps, creating his own fraudulent operation. He assembles a team of unstable but talented individuals, including his naive secretary Veronica, and begins attracting investors, including the ruthless Magnus Hardcastle.

As Zachery’s scheme gains momentum, he becomes increasingly detached from those around him. His ego grows, but cracks begin to show as he struggles to maintain the facade. His investors, including dangerous criminals, start to pull out as returns dwindle. Zachery’s desperate attempts to keep the scheme afloat lead to further moral decay, including the murder of a colleague who uncovers the truth.

In the end, Zachery is confronted with the consequences of his actions. His last attempt to salvage his empire by exploiting hidden funds is thwarted when Veronica, realizing the extent of his deceit, kills him in a fit of rage. The film concludes with Zachery’s demise, leaving behind a legacy of greed and betrayal.

== Cast ==
- Larenz Tate as Zachery Cranston
- Sarah Carter as Veronica
- Julian Richings as Martin Abacus
- Kurtwood Smith as Magnus Hardcastle
- Gil Bellows as Edwin Murk
- Julian De Zotti as Wilfred
- Lance Reddick as Professor Wrightway
- Jessica Parker Kennedy as Dr. Helen
- Angus Macfadyen as Menlo Sartori
- Carolina Bartczak as Amanda Dean
- Dorly Jean-Louis as Nellie Cranston
- Vitali Makarov as Mr. Karamazov
- Laysla De Oliveira as Rosa

== Production ==
Business Ethics had originally been made as a short film under the same title, then adapted into a full-length feature film. It was announced in 2016 that Larenz Tate would star as Zachery Cranston, and shooting of the film began in October 2016 in Toronto, Ontario. Actress Carolina Bartczak was originally intended to serve as a more prominent character and direct antagonist, but this was altered at some point during production; Bartczak still retained her role as character Amanda Dean. Actress Sarah Carter was chosen for the lead female character role, Veronica, in September 2016, while Gil Bellows and Julian Richings had already starred as their respective characters in the earlier short film prototype, and thus retained these roles in the feature film.

The film was produced by Sanzhar Sultan, Innis Lake Entertainment and Skylight Picture Works.

The film utilized mostly Ontario-based scenery for its backgrounds, while the colour purple was used as a reoccurring motif and symbol for ethical morality, appearing on Professor Wrightway's suit and as the color of the teddy bear plush that Veronica takes with her from her original job. According to Larenz Tate, who had aided in production with his two brothers, the Zachery character was interesting to him because the character defied stereotypes and was a complicated portrayal of a black man in a position of wealth and power: "He [Zachery] uses his intellect. He uses his wisdom. He uses his charisma and, that alone, attracted me to the character because we don’t get a chance to see a lot of Black men or Black folks represented in a very white collar corporate high level position", Tate stated in an interview for Bossip. "It’s some craaaazy stuff that goes on that he’s doing–all the things that when people watch this movie, you begin to question your own morality, would you, if you could, try to scheme really wealthy people. And they’re so disconnected, these wealthy people, some of these wealthy people are so disconnected. You always wonder if you had their money what you would do with it but how do you get to their money? You know, we don’t really get a chance to see those–we’re used to seeing some of the stereotypical things but this is a guy who is super smart and becomes very wealthy."

== Distribution ==
Business Ethics released on premium streaming on October 23, 2020, from Fisher Park Media and TateMen Entertainment.

== Accolades ==
Business Ethics won Audience Choice Film Award at the 2019 Newark International Film Festival.
