= The Skylight Room =

Short story by O Henry

"The Skylight Room" is a short story by author William Sydney Porter under pen name O. Henry. The story is about a young woman, Miss Leeson, and her stay at one of Mrs. Parker's parlours. During her stay, Miss Leeson experiences hard times and is later rescued by a star.

The story was published in The Four Million, a collection of short stories by O. Henry that was first published in 1906.

== Summary ==
The protagonist, Miss Leeson, is a typist who rents a room in Mrs. Parker's boarding house. Miss Leeson does not have much money to spare, so she rents the smallest room available. The room is located on the top floor, is quite small, and has a skylight.

Guests of the parlor often collect on the porch in the evenings and chat. One evening, Miss Leeson, who is young and pretty, points out a star in the sky and declares she has named it Billy Jackson. One of the other women corrects her sharply. One of the admiring men defends her made-up name as far better. So go the conversations.

Later in the story the reader finds Miss Leeson on hard times and unable to pay for both rent and food. She returns home to the parlor one day after searching for work. She is weak from lack of food, which she cannot afford. One of the guests offers to marry her, but Miss Leeson declines the offer of rescue, staying true to herself. She makes it to her room and collapses on her bed staring at star Billy Jackson through the skylight as she falls unconscious.

The following day, the maid forces Miss Leeson’s door open when she does not respond. Attempts to revive Miss Leeson fail. An ambulance is called and a dashing physician whisks Miss Leeson away to the hospital. The reader then discovers that the physician was able to save Miss Leeson. In O. Henry fashion, the name of the physician is Dr. William (Billy) Jackson.

== Adaptations ==
The story was adapted as a film in 1917. The Skylight Room starred, among others, Jean Paige as Elsie Leeson, Carlton S. King as Mr. Skidder and Margaret Mann as Miss Longnecker.
