= The Duplicity of Hargraves =

Short story by O'Henry

- Short story by William Sydney Porter
- Original title: The Duplicity of Hargraves
- Language: English
- Genre: Short story

Publication
- Publisher: Junior Munsey
- Publication date: 1902
- Publication place: United States

"The Duplicity of Hargraves" is a short story by the American writer William Sydney Porter, better known by his pen name O. Henry. The story was featured in The Junior Munsey, February 1902, and republished in the volume Sixes and Sevens (1911).

The story features Major Pendelton Talbot, a romanticized figure representing the antebellum South.

== Summary ==
Sixty-eight-year-old Major Pendleton Talbot and his practical spinster daughter Lydia move to Washington, D.C. The Talbots have fallen from their aristocratic past in the South before the American Civil War and are now quite poor. The pair stay at a boarding house in the nation's capital. There they become acquainted with Henry Hopkins Hargraves, an ambitious actor in vaudeville. Hargraves is seemingly spellbound by the Major's tales of his happier past (of which he is writing a book).

Eventually, the Talbots fall behind on their rent. The Major seeks the help of their congressman in getting his book published, but to little avail. The impractical Major spends their last two dollars on play tickets. Lydia is dismayed, but seeing as the money has been spent, goes to see the play with her father. They are shocked to see Hargraves impersonating her father on stage. When Hargraves comes to see the Major to offer him financial help, the Major informs him that he saw the actor's performance and is highly offended. He refuses to accept any money, even though he and Lydia are almost destitute.

Just when the father and daughter's situation is most bleak, "an old colored man" appears and tells the Talbots that he was once one of Talbot's slaves. He has prospered and wants to repay an old family debt. Major Talbot accepts the payment. Later Lydia receives a letter from Hargraves, explaining that he played the ex-slave. She hides the letter from her father.

== Film adaptation ==
"The Duplicity of Hargraves" was adapted to film by Broadway Star Features Co. in 1917 and directed by Thomas R. Mills. The cast was:

- Charles Kent as Major Pendleton
- J. Frank Glendon as Henry Hopkins Hargraves
- Myrtis Coney as Miss Lydia
- Mrs. Fisher as Mrs. Vardeman
- William Courtney as Scen
