= Conscience in Art =

- Short story by O. Henry
- Country: United States
- Language: English
- Genre: Short story

Publication
- Published in: The Gentle Grafter
- Publisher: Doubleday & Company, Inc.
- Publication date: 1907

"Conscience in Art" is a short story by O. Henry (real name William Sydney Porter). It was first published in the 1907 collection The Gentle Grafter and has been reprinted several times, including in the 2007 collection 41 Stories.

The story is about two con men who travel to Pittsburgh, Pennsylvania, and meet a millionaire art collector. According to author David P. Demarest, it is "a comic short story that builds on (and perhaps helped perpetuate) Pittsburgh's turn-of-the-century reputation as a raucous rags-to-riches world full of captains of industry notable for wealth". Carnegie Magazine wrote that it is "a pleasant reminder of the inventiveness and cleverness of that unique artist O. Henry, who can be (and often has been) imitated but has never been equalled".

== Plot ==
"Conscience in Art" is a story told to the author by the character Jeff Peters. In it, Peters recalls one of his adventures with his friend, Andy Tucker. The two men, both swindlers of sorts, are of different mindsets when it comes to their profession. Peters would prefer not to take anything from anyone unless he gives something back in return; Tucker, on the other hand, has no such qualms.

One summer, the two are working in Ohio when Tucker proposes that they go to Pittsburgh to find some "Pittsburg Millionaires", whom he describes by saying, "They are rough but uncivil in their manners, and though their ways are boisterous and unpolished, under it all they have a great deal of impoliteness and discourtesy". He acquiesces to Peters' request that they give the millionaires something in return for their money, and the two go to Pittsburgh. After observing various millionaires during their first few days in the town, Tucker returns to the hotel one night and informs Peters that he has gotten to know one. The man, named Scudder, invited Tucker back to his apartment and showed off his artwork, one of which he was very proud of and bought for US$2,000. This particular carving is supposedly one of only two copies that exist. Peters doesn't care for art, but Tucker tells him to be patient.

The next night, Tucker comes back again, this time with an ivory carving that he says is the second copy of Scudder's. He says that he found it in a pawnshop and got it for $25. The two devise a plan to sell the second copy to Scudder, and the following day Peters disguises himself as a professor and sets up a meeting with the millionaire. After examining the carving, Scudder declares that it is an exact duplicate of his own, and he buys it from Peters for $2,500.

Peters returns to the hotel. Tucker is waiting for him, and he says that they have to hurry to catch the next train out of town. Peters asks why they have to hurry, as they have just pulled off a legitimate business deal. Tucker then replies that Scudder actually bought his own carving, explaining that, "When I was looking at his curios yesterday he stepped out of the room for a moment and I pocketed it". He had made up the pawnshop story "out of respect for" Peters' conscience.
