= Cabbages and Kings (novel) =

1904 novel written by O. Henry

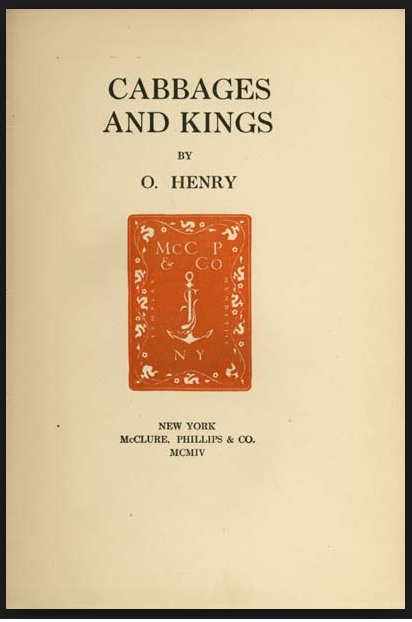
Title page of Cabbages and Kings (1904 edition)

Cabbages and Kings is a 1904 novel made up of interlinked short stories, written by O. Henry and set in a fictitious Central American country called the Republic of Anchuria. It takes its title from the poem "The Walrus and the Carpenter", featured in Lewis Carroll's Through the Looking Glass. Its plot contains famous elements in the poem: shoes and ships and sealing wax, cabbages and kings. It was inspired by the characters and situations that O. Henry encountered in Honduras in the late 1890s.

== Chapters ==
The Proem: By the Carpenter

1. "Fox-in-the-Morning"
2. The Lotus and the Bottle
3. Smith
4. Caught
5. Cupid's Exile Number Two
6. The Phonograph and the Graft
7. The Admiral
8. The Flag Paramount
9. The Shamrock and the Palm
10. The Remnants of the Code
11. Shoes
12. Ships
13. Masters of Arts
14. Dicky
15. Rouge et Noir
16. Two Recalls
17. The Vitagraphoscope

Cabbages and Kings can be classified as a fix-up novel. In the last chapter of the book, "The Vitagraphoscope", O. Henry suggests that it is a "vaudeville" that is "intrinsically episodic and discontinuous". Some characters do their turn—the vaudeville term for an act—and disappear, and others reappear if only briefly.

== New York Times review, December 17, 1904 ==
"The incidents embracing as they do, a variety of subjects, hang loosely together, so loosely in fact, that at times one finds no apparent connection between them at all, and yet in the end one sees how each is intimately related to the other. ... Written by a less able hand than O. Henry's the book might have been a sad jumble, perhaps comprehensible to none but the Walrus—but as it is, one finds a joy in its every obscurity."

== "Banana republic" ==
In one of the chapters, "The Admiral", inspired by the author's experiences in Honduras, where he had lived for six months, he refers to Anchuria as a "small maritime banana republic"; naturally, the fruit was the entire basis of its economy. According to a literary analyst writing for The Economist, "his phrase neatly conjures up the image of a tropical, agrarian country. But its real meaning is sharper: it refers to the fruit companies from the United States that came to exert extraordinary influence over the politics of Honduras and its neighbors." The expression "banana republic" has been used widely since that time, particularly in political commentaries.

== Adaptations ==
It has been adapted three times in the USSR and once in Russia:

- Prezidenty i banany (Президенты и бананы – Presidents and Bananas) – operetta by Moscow Operetta Theater of 1939.
- Kogda more smeyotsya (Когда море смеётся – When the Sea Laughs) — telefilm of 1971, neat adaptation of the book.
- Cabbages and Kings (1978 film) — grotesque movie of 1978.
- Cabbages and Kings (1996 film) — stop-motion animated film of 1996.
