= Roads of Destiny (short story collection) =

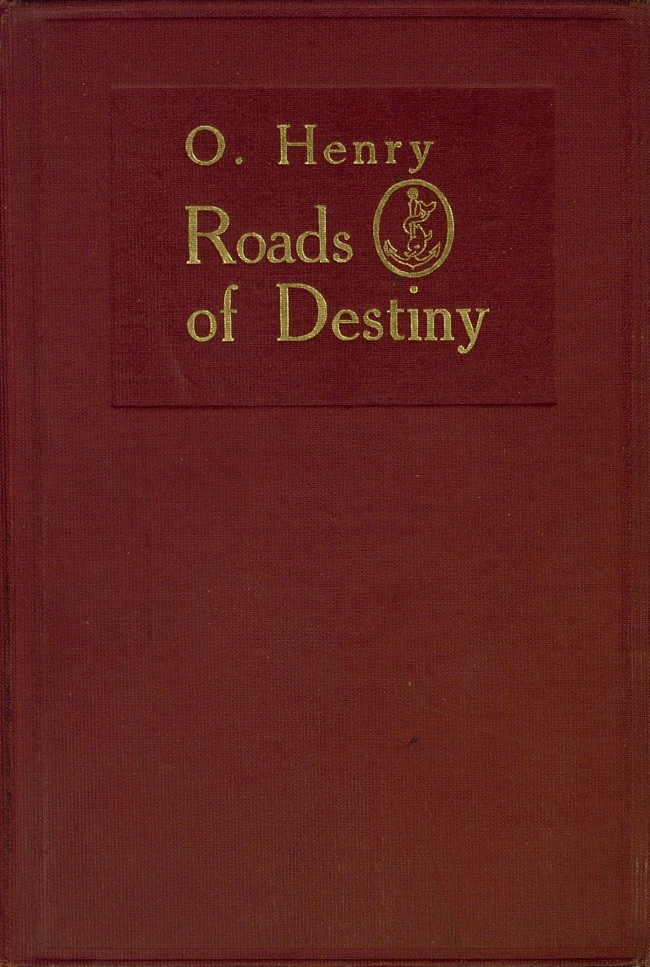
- Author: O. Henry
- Language: English
- Genre: Story collection
- Published: April 1909
- Publication place: United States

Roads of Destiny is a story collection by O. Henry, published in April 1909. There are twenty-two stories.

== Contents ==
- "Roads of Destiny"
- "The Guardian of the Accolade"
- "The Discounters of Money"
- "The Enchanted Profile"
- "'Next to Reading Matter'"
- "Art and the Bronco"
- "Phoebe"
- "A Double-dyed Deceiver"
- "The Passing of Black Eagle"
- "A Retrieved Reformation"
- "Cherchez la Femme"
- "Friends in San Rosario"
- "The Fourth in Salvador"
- "The Emancipation of Billy"
- "The Enchanted Kiss"
- "A Departmental Case"
- "The Renaissance at Charleroi"
- "On Behalf of the Management"
- "Whistling Dick's Christmas Stocking"
- "The Halberdier of the Little Rheinschloss"
- "Two Renegades"
- "The Lonesome Road"
