= The Gift of the Magi =

1905 short story by O. Henry

- Short story by O. Henry
- Cover of the 2008 edition

Text available at Wikisource
- Country: United States
- Language: English
- Genre: Short story

Publication
- Published in: The Four Million
- Publisher: McClure, Phillips, and Company
- Publication date: December 10, 1905 (newspaper); April 10, 1906 (book)

"The Gift of the Magi" is a short story by American writer O. Henry, first published in 1905. The story tells of a young husband and wife and how they deal with the challenge of buying secret Christmas gifts for each other with only a small amount of money. As a sentimental story with a moral lesson about gift-giving, it has been popular for adaptation, especially for presentation at Christmas time. The plot and its twist ending are well known; the ending is generally considered an example of dramatic irony. The story was allegedly written at Pete's Tavern on Irving Place in New York City.

The story was initially published in The New York Sunday World under the title "Gifts of the Magi" on December 10, 1905. It was first published in book form in the O. Henry collection The Four Million in April 1906.

== Plot ==
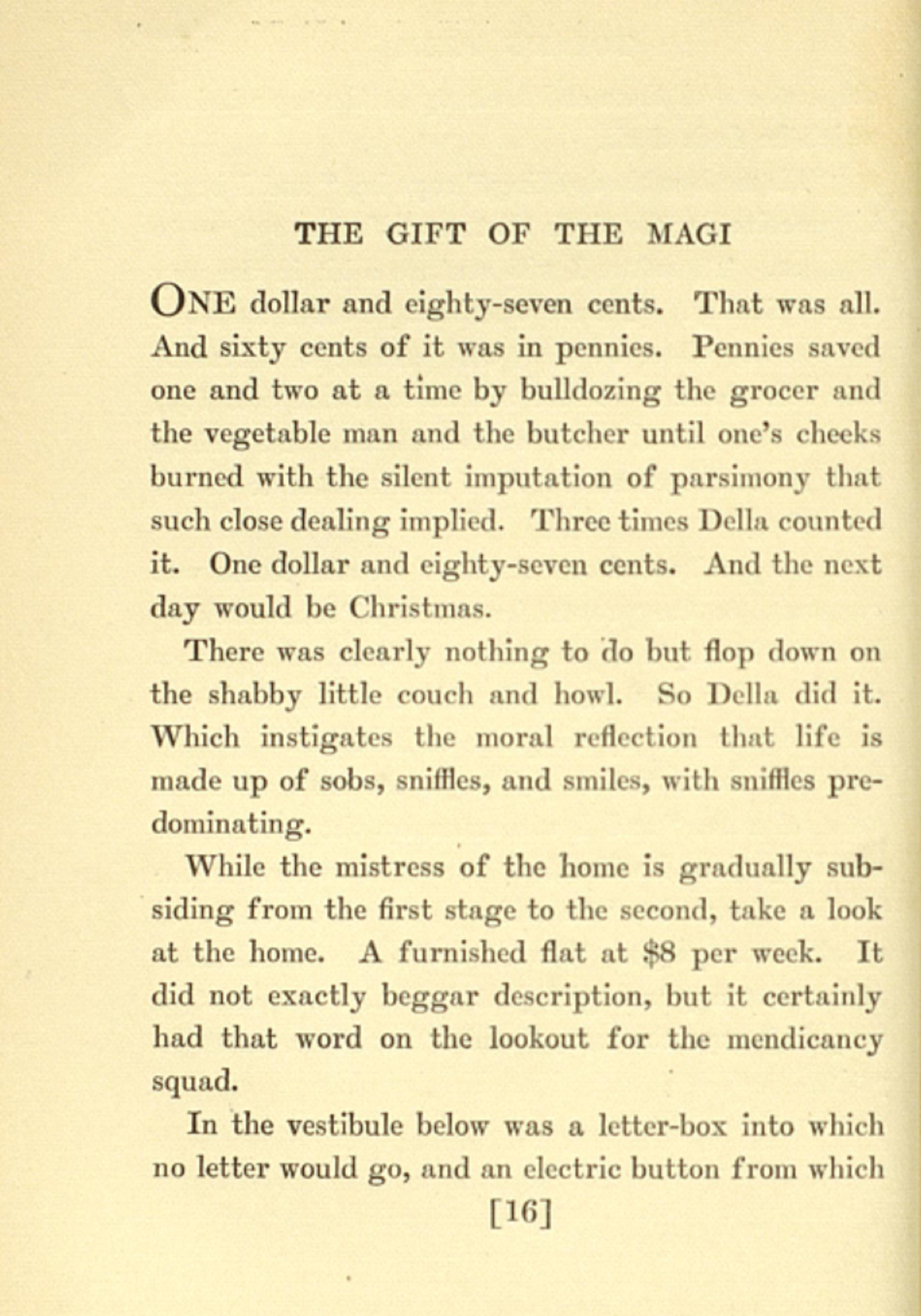
Appearance in the 1906 anthology The Four Million, page 16

On Christmas Eve, a young woman named Della Dillingham Young discovers that she has only $1.87 to buy a present for her husband, James, also known as Jim. The Dillingham Youngs possess two items they value as treasures: Della's knee-length brown hair that would depreciate the Queen of Sheba's jewels, and Jim's gold pocket watch, a family heirloom that would make King Solomon envy him.

Della dresses warmly and visits the nearby shop of a wig maker, Madame Sofronie, who buys Della's hair for $20. Having earned and saved $21.87, Della spends $21.00 to buy a platinum fob chain to go with Jim's watch, which he has attached to a worn leather strap.

When Jim comes home from work that evening, Della confesses to selling her hair to buy him the chain. After reassuring her that he loves her no matter the hair, Jim then gives Della her present: the set of jeweled combs she has always wanted, but cannot use until her hair grows back out. Della gives Jim the chain, and he reveals that he had sold his watch to buy the combs. While they know the gifts they gave each other cannot be used for a while, Jim and Della realize how far they have gone to show each other their love and how invaluable it truly is.

The story ends with the narrator declaring that those who sacrifice their material possessions for the people they love are as wise as the magi who brought gifts to Jesus and invented the tradition of giving presents on Christmas.

== Adaptations ==
=== Films ===
- The Sacrifice (1909)
- Love's Surprises Are Futile (1916)
- The Gift of the Magi (1917)
- As a segment of O. Henry's Full House (1952)
- The Gift of the Magi (1958)
- Dary magów (Poland, 1972)
- Emmet Otter's Jug-Band Christmas (1977)
- The Gift of Love (1978), with Marie Osmond
- The Gift of the Magi (1978 TV Movie), with Debby Boone
- Bert and Ernie’s gift exchange in Christmas Eve on Sesame Street (1978)
- I'll not be a gangster, love (Не буду гангстером, дорогая/Ne budu gangsterom, dorogaya, USSR, 1978),
- As a segment of Mickey's Once Upon a Christmas (1999)
- The Gift of the Magi (2001) is a faithful short film adaptation in which an elderly Della narrates the events of the original short story to her granddaughter.
- The Gift of the Magi (2004)
- Raincoat (2004)
- For the First Time (2010)
- Gift of the Magi (2010), a made-for-TV Hallmark movie starring Marla Sokoloff and Mark Webber and directed by Lisa Mulcahy
- Darovete na vlahvite (2013) directed by Ivan Abadjiev.
- The Gift of the Magi (2014) a Greek film directed by Ismene Daskarolis, places it in the economic crisis of contemporary Greece.
- The Gift of Christmas (2015) is a faithful animated short film adaptation by Pinkfong.
- Mindiyum Paranjum (2025)

=== Other media ===
- In the 1930s, the famous Italian playwright Eduardo De Filippo freely adapted the story to create his drama work Il dono di Natale (Christmas Gift), which is set in Naples.
- In 1955, in The Honeymooners episode 13 of season 1, 'Twas the Night Before Christmas, Ralph looks for the perfect present for Alice for Christmas. Without money, he pawns his prized bowling ball to buy her an expensive gift, only to find out in the end that she bought him a custom bowling ball bag.
- Emmet Otter's Jug-Band Christmas, which is a twist on The Gift of the Magi, is a children's storybook by Russell Hoban which was first published in 1971.
- The anime anthology series Manga Fairy Tales of the World features an adaptation of the story in the 1978 episode Christmas Gift.
- In the 1978 Christmas special Christmas Eve on Sesame Street, Bert and Ernie do a parody of The Gift of the Magi. Ernie gives up his Rubber Duckie to buy Bert a cigar box to put his paperclip collection in, and Bert gives up his paperclip collection to get Ernie a soap dish to put his Rubber Duckie in. In the end, Mr. Hooper happily gives them back their items, realizing how much it hurts to sacrifice their possessions to please each other.
- The Newspaper Enterprise Association distributed a comic strip adaptation, Gifts of the Magi, in 1983. The adaptation was credited to the Joe Kubert School.
- An off-Broadway musical version entitled The Gifts of the Magi premiered at Lamb's Theatre in New York City in 1984. Written by Mark St. Germain and Randy Courts, the play is regularly produced in schools and regional theaters.
- Radio drama series Adventures in Odyssey features a comedic adaptation of this story in its episode Gifts for Madge & Guy (1987).
- The opening sketch of the December 10, 1988, episode of Season 14 of Saturday Night Live reimagines The Gift of the Magi as Donald and Ivana Trump (played by Phil Hartman and Jan Hooks) selling their yacht Princess and estate Mar-a-Lago, each to pay for a gift intended to adorn the other.
- In 1992, in Rugrats episode 27, The Santa Experience, Phil doesn't know what to get Lil, so Angelica convinces him to give up his precious Reptar doll to get Lil crayons for her coloring book and then convinces Lil to give up the coloring book to get a space helmet for Phil's Reptar doll even though Angelica was now in possession of it. The twins both believe the sacrifice is the greatest gift of all, leaving Angelica in bitter Christmas spirits until she returns the original gifts.
- In 1993, an episode of Mystery Science Theater 3000 had TV's Frank selling his hair and buying Dr. Forrester a watch fob. However, Dr. Forrester did not sell his watch to buy Frank a comb, merely thanking Frank for the watch fob for his still-owned watch.
- The title of the 1999 Christmas episode of The Simpsons, Grift of the Magi, is a reference to the story.
- A parody appears in the 1999 Futurama episode Xmas Story, in which Zoidberg gives Amy Wong a set of combs, only for her to reveal that she sold her hair to a wigmaker to buy a set of combs for Hermes Conrad, who then reveals that he sold his hair to a wigmaker to buy a set of combs for Zoidberg. Zoidberg then reveals that he has purchased Amy and Hermes' hair to wear on his head.
- In the 1999 Disney Christmas Video Mickey's Once Upon a Christmas, Mickey Mouse, and Minnie Mouse do an adaptation of The Gift of the Magi. Mickey trades his harmonica to buy Minnie a chain for her watch and Minnie trades her watch to get Mickey a case for his harmonica.
- The beginning moments of the 2002 special, It's a Very Merry Muppet Christmas Movie, feature gags based on the story. For example, while Rizzo the Rat sells his collection of rare cheese to buy Gonzo a dish for his mold collection, Gonzo reveals he sold his mold collection to buy Rizzo a cheese slicer.
- In 2004, during the intro of Season 1, Episode 7 of The L Word (L'Ennui), Marina Ferrer's lover, Francesca Wolff, synopsizes the story while she seduces the prima ballerina of the opera for which she is the costume designer.
- The 2009 Christmas episode of Robot Chicken features a parody of The Gift of the Magi, where Jim refuses to sell his watch for expensive brushes and buys Della lingerie instead, much to her displeasure.
- In the 2009 Christmas special of Phineas and Ferb, Phineas and Ferb Christmas Vacation, Candace sells her necklace that she was planning on trading for earrings to buy her boyfriend Jeremy a new guitar, while Jeremy trades his old guitar, which he was planning on trading for a new one, to buy Candace the earrings she wanted. This twists the story so that each party ends up with the gift they wanted anyway.
- In the 2010 Hallmark Christmas movie special, A Heartland Christmas, Ashley sells her Charm bracelet to buy her husband Caleb a new belt for his All-Around Cowboy belt buckle, while Caleb sells his All-Around Cowboy belt buckle to buy Ashley the Star charm she was looking at earlier in the movie for her Charm bracelet. Upon this discovery, Ashley likens it to an "O. Henry" moment, recounting the story before Caleb interrupts her with a kiss.
- The Disastrous Life of Saiki K. season 2 episode 5 features the storyline, with display cabinet for figurines and a customizable bear doll for a sewing kit that are sold to buy the respective gifts.
- The second track on the 2011 album Knife Man by AJJ is entitled Gift of the Maji 2: Return of the Maji in allusion to this fable.
- The 2012 music video of the Hindi ghazal song 'Aur Ahista Kijiye Baatein' by Pankaj Udhas is based on The Gift of the Magi. It tells the story of an Indian girl living abroad who falls in love with a local biker, and she sells her hair to buy bike accessories for him. When she hands the gifts to him, he reveals he sold his bike to buy a saree and flowers for her. It stars Bollywood actress Sameera Reddy.
- In 2013, writer and illustrator Dara Goldman retold O. Henry's short story as a children's book titled Boris and Stella and the Perfect Gift: A Christmas Hanukkah Story. In this interfaith retelling, two bears — the Russian Jewish Boris and the Italian Christian Stella — are best friends who live together and celebrate both Christmas and Hanukkah. On December 24, Christmas Eve and the eighth day of Hanukkah, the two friends decide to secretly buy each other gifts but both have only managed to save little. Stella sells her potted pine tree to buy Boris an Israeli-made Hanukkah dreidel for his collection, only to find out that he has sold his set to buy her a star-shaped glass Christmas tree-topper to put on her tree.
- Volume 9 of My Youth Romantic Comedy Is Wrong, as I Expected, released in 2014, features a play adaptation of The Gift of the Magi performed by children.
- The 2016 Tantei Opera Milky Holmes special episode, Fun Fun Party Night — Ken to Janet no Okurimono, features a parody of "The Gift of the Magi." The title is a reference to the Japanese title of the story, "Kenja no Okurimono."
- In the 2016 hidden object game Christmas Stories: The Gift of the Magi, one of the three good deeds Oliver must do to rescue his sister, Wendy, from the evil spirit Berta, is helping the Dillingham Youngs pay off their debt and remember the true meaning of Christmas.
- In 2018, an episode of Puppy Dog Pals entitled Bingo and Rolly's Birthday had each of the two dog characters trading their prized possessions (a stick collection, and a Captain Dog action figure) to obtain gifts for each other (a box for the stick collection, and a spring to repair the launcher on the action figure).
- A parody appears in the 2019 Family Guy episode Bri, Robot, in which Peter Griffin gets a job as a masseur, using the money he earns to buy Lois Griffin a comb for her beautiful hair, only for her to reveal that she sold her beautiful hair to buy him a bottle of massage oil.
- In Glee season 2, episode 10, Mr. Shue talks about the tale with their students in the choir.
- In 2019, composer Eric Whitacre composed and conducted a one-act chamber opera of The Gift of the Magi for five soloists, piano, and the Los Angeles Master Chorale.
- In Fablehaven: Rise of the Evening Star by Brandon Mull, Errol Fisk references the tale while conversing with Kendra about his livelihood.
- In Honkai: Star Rail, the quest line Hook's Gift is based on this tale.
- Published in 2022, bestselling author Freida McFadden created a "gripping Christmas-themed thrilling short story inspired by the classic O. Henry tale, The Gift of the Magi," called The Gift.
- In November 2023, StarKid Productions and composer Clark Baxtresser's musical VHS Christmas Carols premiered live at the Apollo Theater in Chicago, featuring a segment based on The Gift of the Magi. Originally a 2020 virtual show based solely on Charles Dickens' A Christmas Carol that would receive a live run and recording in 2021, a first act was added in 2023 to adapt Magi in addition to Hans Christian Andersen's The Little Match Girl.

== See also ==
- List of Christmas-themed literature
