= O. Henry =

American writer (1862–1910)

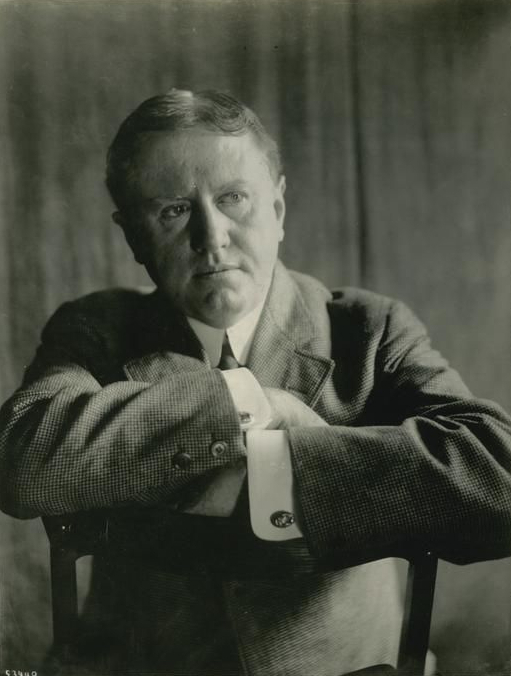
- Portrait by W. M. Vanderweyde, 1909
- Born: William Sidney Porter; September 11, 1862; Greensboro, North Carolina
- Died: June 5, 1910 (aged 47); New York City, New York
- Resting place: Riverside Cemetery, Asheville, North Carolina, U.S.
- Occupation: Writer
- Spouse(s): Athol Estes (m. 1887; died 1897) Sarah Coleman (m. 1907; sep. 1909)
- Children: 2
- Writing career
- Pen name: O. Henry, Olivier Henry, Oliver Henry
- Genre: Short story

William Sydney Porter (born William Sidney Porter; September 11, 1862 – June 5, 1910), better known by his pen name O. Henry, was an American writer known primarily for his short stories, though he also wrote poetry and non-fiction. His works include "The Gift of the Magi", "The Caballero's Way", "The Duplicity of Hargraves", and "The Ransom of Red Chief", as well as the novel Cabbages and Kings. Porter's stories are known for their naturalist observations, witty narration, and surprise endings.

Born in Greensboro, North Carolina, Porter worked at his uncle's pharmacy after finishing school and became a licensed pharmacist at age 19. In March 1882, he moved to Texas, where he initially lived on a ranch, and later settled in Austin, where he met his first wife, Athol Estes. While working as a drafter for the Texas General Land Office, Porter began developing characters for his short stories. He later worked for the First National Bank of Austin, while also publishing a weekly periodical, The Rolling Stone.

In 1895, he was charged with embezzlement stemming from an audit of the bank. Before the trial, he fled to Honduras, where he began writing Cabbages and Kings, in which he coined the term "banana republic". Porter surrendered to U.S. authorities when he learned his wife was dying from tuberculosis, and he cared for her until her death in July 1897. He began his five-year prison sentence in March 1898 at the Ohio Penitentiary, where he served as a night druggist. While imprisoned, Porter published 14 stories under various pseudonyms, one being O. Henry.

Released from prison early for good behavior, Porter moved to Pittsburgh to be with his daughter Margaret before relocating to New York City, where he wrote 381 short stories. He married Sarah (Sallie) Lindsey Coleman in 1907; she left him two years later. Porter died on June 5, 1910, after years of deteriorating health. Porter's legacy includes the O. Henry Award, an annual prize awarded to outstanding short stories.

== Biography ==
=== Early life ===
William Sidney Porter was born on September 11, 1862, in Greensboro, North Carolina, during the American Civil War. He changed the spelling of his middle name to Sydney in 1898. His parents were Algernon Sidney Porter (1825–88), a physician, and Mary Jane Virginia Swaim Porter (1833–65). William's parents had married on April 20, 1858. When William was three, his mother died after giving birth to her third child, and he and his father moved into the home of his paternal grandmother. As a child, Porter was always reading, everything from classics to dime novels; his favorite works were Lane's translation of One Thousand and One Nights and Burton's The Anatomy of Melancholy.

Porter graduated from his aunt Evelina Maria Porter's elementary school in 1876. He then enrolled at the Lindsey Street High School. His aunt continued to tutor him until he was 15. In 1879, he started working in his uncle's drugstore in Greensboro, and on August 30, 1881, at the age of 19, Porter was licensed as a pharmacist. At the drugstore, he also showed his natural artistic talents by sketching the townsfolk.

=== Life in Texas ===
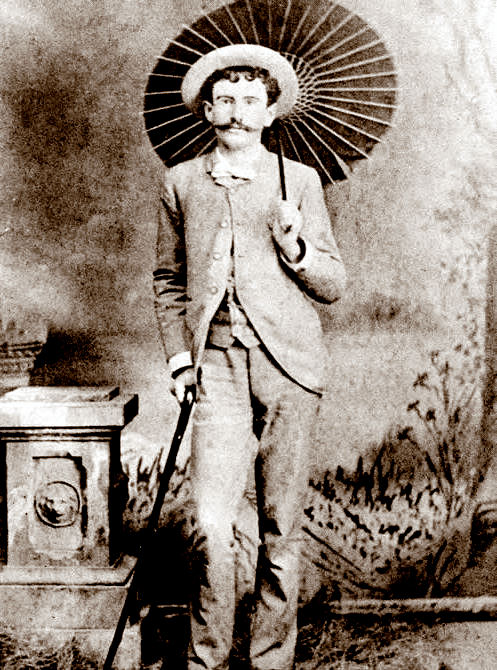
Porter as a young man in Austin

Porter traveled along with James K. Hall to Texas in March 1882, hoping that a change of air would help alleviate a persistent cough he had developed. He took up residence on the sheep ranch of Richard Hall, James Hall's son, in La Salle County and helped out as a shepherd, ranch hand, cook, and baby-sitter. While on the ranch, he learned bits of Spanish and German from the mix of indigenous and immigrant ranch hands. He also spent time reading classic works of literature.

Porter's health improved. He traveled with Richard to Austin, Texas, in 1884, where he decided to remain and was welcomed into the home of Richard's friends, Joseph Harrell, and his wife. Porter resided with the Harrells for three years. He went to work briefly for the Morley Brothers Drug Company as a pharmacist. Porter then moved on to work for the Harrell Cigar Store located in the Driskill Hotel. He also began writing as a sideline and wrote many of his early stories in the Harrell house.

As a young bachelor, Porter led an active social life in Austin. He was known for his wit, story-telling, and musical talents. He played both the guitar and mandolin. He sang in the choir at St. David's Episcopal Church and became a member of the "Hill City Quartette", a group of young men who sang at gatherings and serenaded young women of the town.

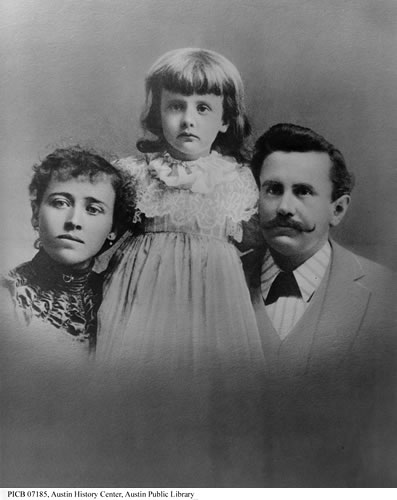
The Porter family, early 1890s – Athol, daughter Margaret, William

Porter met and began courting Athol Estes, 17 years old and from a wealthy family. Historians believe Porter met Athol at the laying of the cornerstone of the Texas State Capitol on March 2, 1885. Her mother objected to the match because Athol was ill, suffering from tuberculosis. On July 1, 1887, Porter eloped with Athol and they were married in the parlor of the home of the Reverend R. K. Smoot, pastor of the Central Presbyterian Church, where the Estes family attended church. The couple continued to participate in musical and theater groups, and Athol encouraged her husband to pursue his writing. Athol gave birth to a son in 1888, who died hours after birth, and then a daughter Margaret Worth Porter in September 1889.

Porter's friend Richard Hall became Texas Land Commissioner and offered Porter a job. Porter started as a draftsman at the Texas General Land Office (GLO) on January 12, 1887, at a salary of $100 a month, drawing maps from surveys and field notes. The salary was enough to support his family, but he continued his contributions to magazines and newspapers. In the GLO building, he began developing characters and plots for such stories as "Georgia's Ruling" (1900), and "Buried Treasure" (1908). The castle-like building he worked in was woven into some of his tales such as "Bexar Scrip No. 2692" (1894). His job at the GLO was a political appointment by Hall. Hall ran for governor in the election of 1890 but lost. Porter resigned on January 21, 1891, the day after the new governor, Jim Hogg, was sworn in.

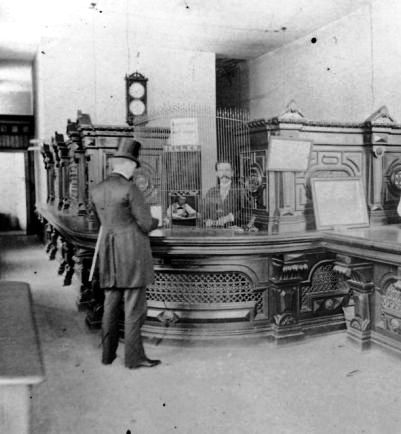
Porter as a clerk at the First National Bank in Austin, c. 1892

The same year, Porter began working at the First National Bank of Austin as a teller and bookkeeper at the same salary he had made at the GLO. The bank was operated informally, and Porter was apparently careless in keeping his books and may have embezzled funds. In 1894, he was accused by the bank of embezzlement and lost his job but was not indicted at the time.

He then worked full-time on his humorous weekly called The Rolling Stone, which he started while working at the bank. The Rolling Stone featured satire on life, people, and politics and included Porter's short stories and sketches. Although eventually reaching a top circulation of 1,500, The Rolling Stone failed in April 1895 because the paper never provided an adequate income. However, his writing and drawings had caught the attention of the editor at the Houston Post.

Porter and his family moved to Houston in 1895, where he started writing for the Post. His salary was only $25 a month, but it rose steadily as his popularity increased. Porter gathered ideas for his column by loitering in hotel lobbies and observing and talking to people there. This was a technique he used throughout his writing career.

While he was in Houston, federal auditors audited the First National Bank of Austin and found the embezzlement shortages that led to his firing. A federal indictment followed, and he was arrested on charges of embezzlement.

=== Flight and return ===
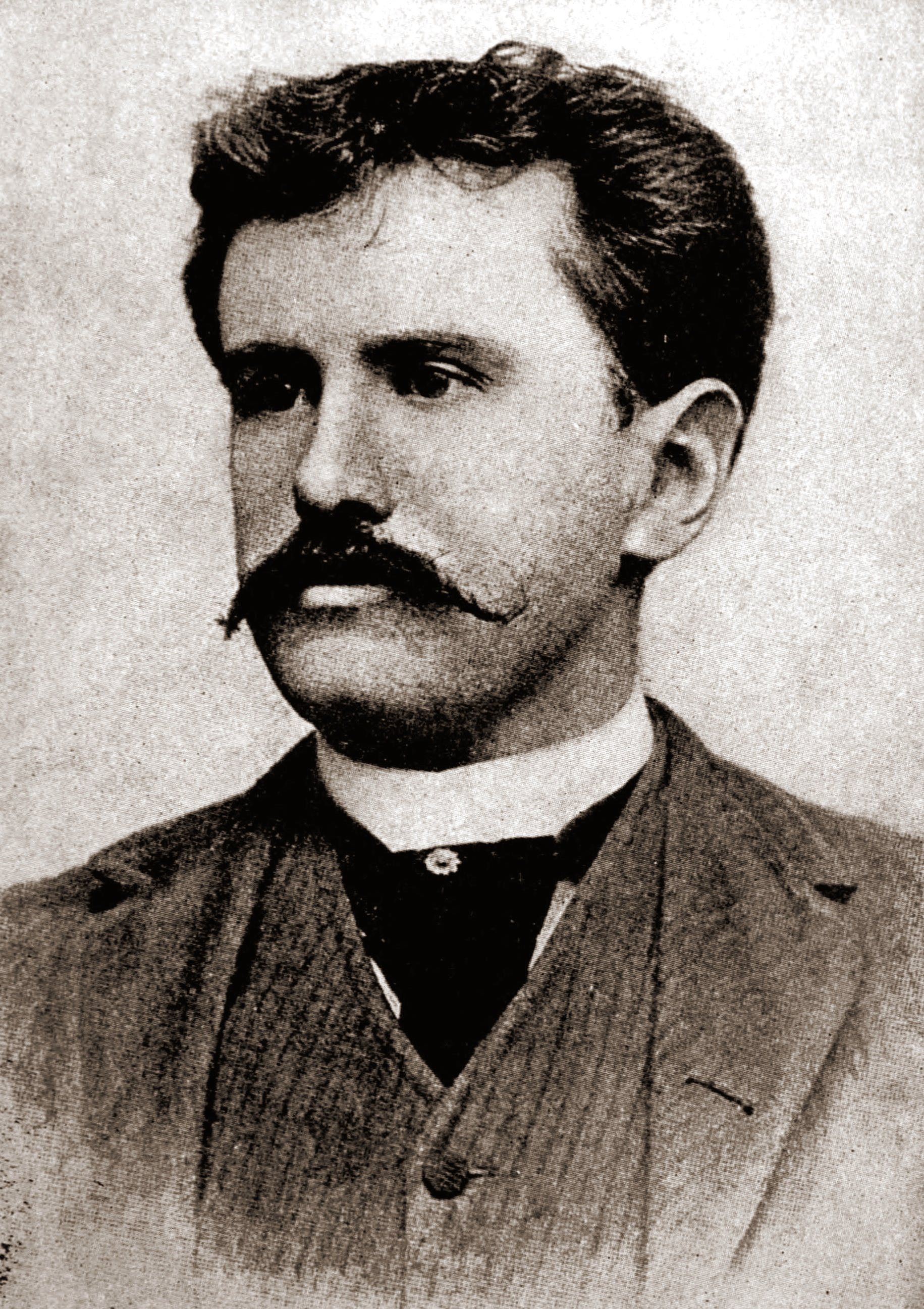
Porter in his thirties

After his arrest, Porter's father-in-law posted his bail. He was due to stand trial on July 7, 1896, but the day before, as he was changing trains to get to the courthouse, he got scared. He fled, first to New Orleans and later to Honduras, with which the United States had no extradition treaty at that time. Porter lived in Honduras for six months, until January 1897. There he became friends with Al Jennings, a notorious train robber, who later wrote a book about their friendship.

He holed up in a Trujillo hotel, where he wrote Cabbages and Kings, in which he coined the term "banana republic". Porter had sent Athol and Margaret back to Austin to live with Athol's parents. Unfortunately, Athol became too ill to meet Porter in Honduras as he had planned. When he learned that his wife was dying, Porter returned to Austin in February 1897 and surrendered to the court, pending trial. Athol Estes Porter died from tuberculosis, then known as consumption, on July 25, 1897.

Porter had little to say in his own defense at his trial and was found guilty on February 17, 1898, of embezzling $854.08. He was sentenced to five years in prison and imprisoned on March 25, 1898, at the Ohio Penitentiary in Columbus, Ohio. Porter was a licensed pharmacist and was able to work in the prison hospital as the night druggist. He was given his own room in the hospital wing, and there is no record that he actually spent time in the cell block of the prison.

He had 14 stories published under pseudonyms while he was in prison but was becoming best known as "O. Henry", a pseudonym that first appeared over the story "Whistling Dick's Christmas Stocking" in the December 1899 issue of McClure's Magazine. A friend of his in New Orleans would forward his stories to publishers so that they had no idea that the writer was imprisoned.

Porter was released on July 24, 1901, for good behavior after serving three years. He reunited with his daughter Margaret, now age 11, in Pittsburgh, Pennsylvania, where Athol's parents had moved after Porter's conviction.

=== Later life ===
Porter's most prolific writing period started in 1902, when he moved to New York City to be near his publishers. While there, he wrote 381 short stories. He wrote a story a week for over a year for the New York World Sunday Magazine. His wit, characterization, and plot twists were adored by his readers but often panned by critics.

Porter married again in 1907 to childhood sweetheart Sarah (Sallie) Lindsey Coleman, whom he met again after revisiting his native state of North Carolina. Coleman was herself a writer and wrote a romanticized and fictionalized version of their correspondence and courtship in her novella Wind of Destiny.

=== Death ===
Porter was a heavy drinker, and by 1908, his markedly deteriorating health affected his writing. In 1909, Sarah left him, and he died on June 5, 1910, of cirrhosis of the liver, complications of diabetes, and an enlarged heart. According to one account, he died of cerebral hemorrhage.

After funeral services in New York City, he was buried in the Riverside Cemetery in Asheville, North Carolina. His daughter Margaret Worth Porter had a short writing career from 1913 to 1916. She married cartoonist Oscar Cesare of New York in 1916; they were divorced four years later. She died of tuberculosis in 1927 and was buried next to her father.

According to the cemetery, as of 2023, people have been leaving $1.87 in change (the amount of Della's savings at the beginning of "The Gift of the Magi") on Porter's grave for at least 30 years. The cemetery says the money is given to area libraries.

== Stories ==
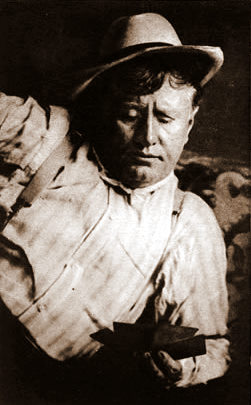
The portrait used as frontispiece in Waifs and Strays, posthumous, 1917

Most of Porter's stories are set in his own time, the early 20th century. He had an obvious affection for New York City, which he called "Bagdad-on-the-Subway", and many of his stories are set there, while others are set in small towns or in other cities. They frequently feature working class characters, such as policemen and waitresses, as well as criminals and social outcasts. In his day he was called the American answer to French naturalist Guy de Maupassant, whose work was similarly concerned with the struggles of common people and often had twist endings.

Cabbages and Kings was his first collection of stories, followed by The Four Million. The second collection opens with a reference to Ward McAllister's claim that there were "...only 'Four Hundred' people in New York City who were really worth noticing. But a wiser man has arisen—the census taker—and his larger estimate of human interest has been preferred in marking out the field of these little stories of the Four Million."

His final work was "Dream", a short story intended for the magazine The Cosmopolitan. It was never completed.

Among his most famous stories are:

- "The Gift of the Magi" is about a young couple, Jim and Della, who are short of money but desperately want to buy each other Christmas gifts. Unbeknownst to Jim, Della sells her most valuable possession, her beautiful hair, in order to buy a platinum fob chain for Jim's watch; while unbeknownst to Della, Jim sells his own most valuable possession, his watch, to buy jeweled combs for Della's hair. The essential premise of this story has been copied, re-worked, parodied, and otherwise re-told countless times in the century since it was written.
- "The Ransom of Red Chief" in which two men kidnap a ten-year-old boy to ransom him. The boy turns out to be so spoiled and obnoxious that the desperate men ultimately pay the boy's father $250 to take him back.
- "The Cop and the Anthem" about a New York City hobo named Soapy who sets out to get arrested so that he can be a guest of the city jail instead of sleeping out in the cold winter. Despite his best efforts at committing petty theft, vandalism, disorderly conduct, and "flirting" with a young prostitute, Soapy fails to draw the attention of the police. Dejected, he stops in front of a church, where an organ anthem inspires him to clean up his life; however, he is charged with loitering, and sentenced to three months in prison.
- "A Retrieved Reformation" tells the tale of safecracker Jimmy Valentine, a man recently freed from prison. He goes to a town bank to case it before he robs it. As he walks to the door, he catches the eye of the banker's beautiful daughter. They immediately fall in love and Valentine decides to give up his criminal career. He moves into the town, taking up the identity of Ralph Spencer, a shoemaker. Just as he is about to leave to deliver his specialized tools to an old associate, a lawman who recognizes him arrives at the bank. Jimmy and his fiancée and her family are at the bank, inspecting a new safe when a child accidentally gets locked inside the airtight vault. Knowing it will seal his fate, Valentine opens the safe to rescue the child. However, much to Valentine's surprise, the lawman denies recognizing him and lets him go.
- "The Duplicity of Hargraves" tells the story of the Talbots, a father and daughter from the Old South, newly poor after the Civil War, who move to Washington, DC. An actor, Hargraves, offers Mr. Talbot money, which he is too proud to accept. But when Talbot is approached by an old man, a former slave who gives him money to settle an old family debt, he accepts it. It is later revealed that Hargraves secretly portrayed the slave.
- "The Caballero's Way" in which Porter's most famous character, the Cisco Kid, is introduced. It was first published in 1907 in the July issue of Everybody's Magazine and collected in the book Heart of the West that same year. In later film and TV depictions, the Kid would be portrayed as a dashing adventurer, perhaps skirting the edges of the law, but primarily on the side of the angels. In the original short story, the only story by Porter to feature the character, the Kid is a murderous, ruthless border desperado, whose trail is dogged by a heroic Texas Ranger.

== Pen name ==
Porter used a number of pen names (including "O. Henry" or "Olivier Henry") in the early part of his writing career; other names included S.H. Peters, James L. Bliss, T.B. Dowd, and Howard Clark. Nevertheless, the name "O. Henry" seemed to garner the most attention from editors and the public, and was used exclusively by Porter for his writing by about 1902. He gave various explanations for the origin of his pen name. In 1909, he gave an interview to The New York Times, in which he gave an account of it:

It was during these New Orleans days that I adopted my pen name of O. Henry. I said to a friend: "I'm going to send out some stuff. I don't know if it amounts to much, so I want to get a literary alias. Help me pick out a good one." He suggested that we get a newspaper and pick a name from the first list of notables that we found in it. In the society columns we found the account of a fashionable ball. "Here we have our notables," said he. We looked down the list and my eye lighted on the name Henry, "That'll do for a last name," said I. "Now for a first name. I want something short. None of your three-syllable names for me." "Why don't you use a plain initial letter, then?" asked my friend. "Good," said I, "O is about the easiest letter written, and O it is."

A newspaper once wrote and asked me what the O stands for. I replied, "O stands for Olivier, the French for Oliver." And several of my stories accordingly appeared in that paper under the name Olivier Henry.

William Trevor writes in the introduction to The World of O. Henry: Roads of Destiny and Other Stories (Hodder & Stoughton, 1973) that "there was a prison guard named Orrin Henry" in the Ohio State Penitentiary "whom William Sydney Porter ... immortalised as O. Henry".

According to J. F. Clarke, it is from the name of the French pharmacist Etienne Ossian Henry, whose name is in the U.S. Dispensary which Porter used working in the prison pharmacy.

Writer and scholar Guy Davenport offers his own hypothesis: "The pseudonym that he began to write under in prison is constructed from the first two letters of Ohio and the second and last two of penitentiary."

== Legacy ==
The O. Henry Award is an annual prize named after Porter and given to outstanding short stories.

The Soviet film The Great Consoler (1933), directed by Lev Kuleshov, combines adaptations of two short stories with a telling of O. Henry's life.

A film was made in 1952 featuring five stories, called O. Henry's Full House. The episode garnering the most critical acclaim was "The Cop and the Anthem" starring Charles Laughton and Marilyn Monroe. The other stories are "The Clarion Call", "The Last Leaf", "The Ransom of Red Chief", and "The Gift of the Magi".

Strictly Business is a 1962 Soviet comedy film, directed by Leonid Gaidai, based on three short stories by O. Henry: "The Roads We Take", "Makes the Whole World Kin", and "The Ransom of Red Chief". The premiere of the film was timed to coincide with the 100th anniversary of the birth of the writer. Henry was particularly popular in Russia in the 1920s, and was described by the critic Deming Brown in 1953 as "remain[ing] a minor classic in Russia". In 1962, the Soviet Postal Service issued a stamp commemorating O. Henry's 100th birthday.

A 1957 television series, The O. Henry Playhouse, was syndicated in 39 episodes to 188 markets. Actor Thomas Mitchell portrayed O. Henry in each episode as he interacted with his characters or related his latest story to his publisher or a friend.

The 1986 Indian anthology television series Katha Sagar adapted several of Henry's short stories as episodes including "The Last Leaf".

An opera in one long act, The Furnished Room, with music by Daniel Steven Crafts and libretto by Richard Kuss, is based on O. Henry's story of the same name.

The O. Henry House and O. Henry Hall, both in Austin, Texas, are named for him. O. Henry Hall, now owned by the Texas State University System, previously served as the federal courthouse in which O. Henry was convicted of embezzlement. The O. Henry House has been the site of the O. Henry Pun-Off, an annual spoken word competition inspired by Porter's love of language, since 1978. Dr. Samuel E. Gideon, a historical architect and professor at the University of Texas at Austin, was a strong advocate for the saving of the O. Henry House in Austin.

Several schools are named for Porter: William Sydney Porter Elementary in Greensboro, North Carolina, O. Henry Elementary in Garland, Texas, the O. Henry School (I.S. 70) in New York City, and O. Henry Middle School in Austin, Texas.

The O. Henry Hotel in Greensboro is also named for Porter, as is US 29, which is O. Henry Boulevard.

Asheville, North Carolina, where Porter is buried, has O. Henry Avenue, the location of the Asheville Citizen-Times building.

On September 11, 2012, the United States Postal Service issued a stamp commemorating the 150th anniversary of O. Henry's birth.

On November 23, 2011, Barack Obama quoted O. Henry while granting pardons to two turkeys named "Liberty" and "Peace". In response, political science professor P. S. Ruckman Jr. and Texas attorney Scott Henson filed a formal application for a posthumous pardon in September 2012, the same month that the U.S. Postal Service issued its O. Henry stamp. Previous attempts were made to obtain such a pardon for Porter in the administrations of Woodrow Wilson, Dwight Eisenhower, and Ronald Reagan, but no one had ever bothered to file a formal application. Ruckman and Henson argued that Porter deserved a pardon because (1) he was a law-abiding citizen prior to his conviction; (2) his offense was minor; (3) he had an exemplary prison record; (4) his post-prison life clearly indicated rehabilitation; (5) he would have been an excellent candidate for clemency in his time, had he but applied for pardon; (6) by today's standards, he remains an excellent candidate for clemency; and (7) his pardon would be a well-deserved symbolic gesture and more. The pardon remains ungranted.

In 2021 the Library of America included O. Henry in their list by publishing a collection of 101 of his stories, edited by Ben Yagoda.

== Bibliography ==
=== Stories ===
Collections:

- Cabbages and Kings (1904), novel consisting of linked stories. Collection of 19 short stories:
  "The Proem: By the Carpenter", "'Fox-in-the-Morning'", "The Lotus and the Bottle", "Smith", "Caught", "Cupid's Exile Number Two", "The Phonograph and the Graft", "Money Maze", "The Admiral", "The Flag Paramount", "The Shamrock and the Palm", "The Remnants of the Code", "Shoes", "Ships", "Masters of Arts", "Dicky", "Rouge et Noir", "Two Recalls", "The Vitagraphoscope"
- The Four Million (1906), collection of 25 short stories:
  "Tobin's Palm", "The Gift of the Magi", "A Cosmopolite in a Cafe", "Between Rounds", "The Skylight Room", "A Service of Love", "The Coming-Out of Maggie", "Man About Town", "The Cop and the Anthem", "An Adjustment of Nature", "Memoirs of a Yellow Dog", "The Love-Philtre of Ikey Schoenstein", "Mammon and the Archer", "Springtime à la Carte", "The Green Door", "From the Cabby's Seat", "An Unfinished Story", "The Caliph, Cupid and the Clock", "Sisters of the Golden Circle", "The Romance of a Busy Broker", "After Twenty Years", "Lost on Dress Parade", "By Courier", "The Furnished Room", "The Brief Debut of Tildy"
- The Trimmed Lamp (1907), collection of 25 short stories:
  "The Trimmed Lamp", "A Madison Square Arabian Night", "The Rubaiyat of a Scotch Highball", "The Pendulum", "Two Thanksgiving Day Gentlemen", "The Assessor of Success", "The Buyer from Cactus City", "The Badge of Policeman O'Roon", "Brickdust Row" (made into the 1918 film, Everybody's Girl), "The Making of a New Yorker", "Vanity and Some Sables", "The Social Triangle", "The Purple Dress", "The Foreign Policy of Company 99", "The Lost Blend", "A Harlem Tragedy", "'The Guilty Party'", "A Midsummer Knight's Dream", "According to Their Lights", "The Last Leaf", "The Count and the Wedding Guest", "The Country of Elusion", "The Ferry of Unfulfilment", "The Tale of a Tainted Tenner", "Elsie in New York"
- Heart of the West (1907), collection of 19 short stories:
  "Hearts and Crosses", "The Ransom of Mack", "Telemachus, Friend", "The Handbook of Hymen", "The Pimienta Pancakes", "Seats of the Haughty", "Hygeia at the Solito", "An Afternoon Miracle", "The Higher Abdication", "Cupid à la Carte", "The Caballero's Way", "The Sphinx Apple", "The Missing Chord", "A Call Loan", "The Princess and the Puma", "The Indian Summer of Dry Valley Johnson", "Christmas by Injunction", "A Chaparral Prince", "The Reformation of Calliope"
- The Gentle Grafter (1908), collection of 14 short stories:
  "The Octopus Marooned", "Jeff Peters as a Personal Magnet", "Modern Rural Sports", "The Chair of Philanthromathematics", "The Hand That Riles the World", "The Exact Science of Matrimony", "A Midsummer Masquerade", "Shearing the Wolf", "Innocents of Broadway", "Conscience in Art", "The Man Higher Up", "A Tempered Wind", "Hostages to Momus", "The Ethics of Pig"
- The Voice of the City (1908), collection of 25 short stories:
  "The Voice of the City", "The Complete Life of John Hopkins", "A Lickpenny Lover", "Dougherty's Eye-opener", "'Little Speck in Garnered Fruit'", "The Harbinger", "While the Auto Waits", "A Comedy in Rubber", "One Thousand Dollars", "The Defeat of the City", "The Shocks of Doom", "The Plutonian Fire", "Nemesis and the Candy Man", "Squaring the Circle", "Roses, Ruses and Romance", "The City of Dreadful Night", "The Easter of the Soul", "The Fool-killer", "Transients in Arcadia", "The Rathskeller and the Rose", "The Clarion Call", "Extradited from Bohemia", "A Philistine in Bohemia", "From Each According to His Ability", "The Memento"
- Roads of Destiny (1909), collection of 22 short stories:
  "Roads of Destiny", "The Guardian of the Accolade", "The Discounters of Money", "The Enchanted Profile", "Next to Reading Matter", "Art and the Bronco", "Phoebe", "A Double-dyed Deceiver", "The Passing of Black Eagle", "A Retrieved Reformation", "Cherchez la Femme", "Friends in San Rosario", "The Fourth in Salvador", "The Emancipation of Billy", "The Enchanted Kiss", "A Departmental Case", "The Renaissance at Charleroi", "On Behalf of the Management", "Whistling Dick's Christmas Stocking", "The Halberdier of the Little Rheinschloss", "Two Renegades", "The Lonesome Road"
- Options (1909), collection of 16 short stories:
  "'The Rose of Dixie'", "The Third Ingredient", "The Hiding of Black Bill", "Schools and Schools", "Thimble, Thimble", "Supply and Demand", "Buried Treasure", "To Him Who Waits", "He Also Serves", "The Moment of Victory", "The Head-hunter", "No Story", "The Higher Pragmatism", "Best-seller", "Rus in Urbe", "A Poor Rule"
- The Two Women (1910), collection of 2 short stories:
  "A Fog in Santone", "Blind Man's Holiday"
- Strictly Business (1910), collection of 23 short stories:
  "Strictly Business", "The Gold That Glittered", "Babes in the Jungle", "The Day Resurgent", "The Fifth Wheel", "The Poet and the Peasant", "The Robe of Peace", "The Girl and the Graft", "The Call of the Tame", "The Unknown Quantity", "The Thing's the Play", "A Ramble in Aphasia", "A Municipal Report", "Psyche and the Pskyscraper", "A Bird of Bagdad", "Compliments of the Season", "A Night in New Arabia", "The Girl and the Habit", "Proof of the Pudding", "Past One at Rooney's", "The Venturers", "The Duel", "'What You Want'"
- Whirligigs (1910), collection of 24 short stories:
  "The World and the Door", "The Theory and the Hound", "The Hypotheses of Failure", "Calloway's Code", "A Matter of Mean Elevation", "Girl", "Sociology in Serge and Straw", "The Ransom of Red Chief", "The Marry Month of May", "A Technical Error", "Suite Homes and Their Romance", "The Whirligig of Life", "A Sacrifice Hit", "The Roads We Take", "A Blackjack Bargainer", "The Song and the Sergeant", "One Dollar's Worth", "A Newspaper Story", "Tommy's Burglar", "A Chaparral Christmas Gift", "A Little Local Colour", "Georgia's Ruling", "Blind Man's Holiday", "Madame Bo-Peep of the Ranches"
- Sixes and Sevens (1911), collection of 25 short stories:
  "The Last of the Troubadours", "The Sleuths", "Witches' Loaves", "The Pride of the Cities", "Holding Up a Train", "Ulysses and the Dogman", "The Champion of the Weather", "Makes the Whole World Kin", "At Arms with Morpheus", "A Ghost of a Chance", "Jimmy Hayes and Muriel", "The Door of Unrest", "The Duplicity of Hargraves", "Let Me Feel Your Pulse", "October and June", "The Church with an Overshot-Wheel", "New York by Camp Fire Light", "The Adventures of Shamrock Jolnes", "The Lady Higher Up", "The Greater Coney", "Law and Order", "Transformation of Martin Burney", "The Caliph and the Cad", "The Diamond of Kali", "The Day We Celebrate"
- Rolling Stones (1912), collection of
  23 short stories: "The Dream", "A Ruler of Men", "The Atavism of John Tom Little Bear", "Helping the Other Fellow", "The Marionettes", "The Marquis and Miss Sally", "A Fog in Santone", "The Friendly Call", "A Dinner at ———", "Sound and Fury" (1903), "Tictocq", "Tracked to Doom", "A Snapshot at the President", "An Unfinished Christmas Story", "The Unprofitable Servant", "Aristocracy Versus Hash", "The Prisoner of Zembla", "A Strange Story", "Fickle Fortune, or How Gladys Hustled", "An Apology", "Lord Oakhurst's Curse", "Bexar Scrip No. 2692.", "Queries and Answers"
  12 poems:
  "The Pewee", "Nothing to say", "The Murderer"
  Some Postscripts: "Two Portraits", "A Contribution", "The Old Farm", "Vanity", "The Lullaby Boy", "Chanson de Bohême", "Hard to Forget", "Drop a Tear in This Slot", "Tamales"
  letters: "Some Letters"
- Waifs and Strays (1917), collection of 12 short stories:
  "The Red Roses of Tonia", "Round The Circle", "The Rubber Plant's Story", "Out of Nazareth", "Confessions of a Humorist", "The Sparrows in Madison Square", "Hearts and Hands", "The Cactus", "The Detective Detector", "The Dog and the Playlet", "A Little Talk About Mobs", "The Snow Man"
- O. Henryana (1920), collection of 7 short stories:
  "The Crucible", "A Lunar Episode", "Three Paragraphs", "Bulger's Friend", "A Professional Secret", "The Elusive Tenderloin", "The Struggle of the Outliers"
- Postscripts (1923), collection of 103 short stories, 26 poems and 4 articles:
  "The Sensitive Colonel Jay", "Taking No Chances", "A Matter of Loyalty", "The Other Side of It", "Journalistically Impossible", "The Power of Reputation", "The Distraction of Grief", "A Sporting Interest", "Had A Use for It", "The Old Landmark", "A Personal Insult", "Toddlekins" (poem), "Reconciliation", "Buying a Piano", "Too Late", "Nothing to say" (poem), "'Goin Home fur Christmas'" (poem), "Just a Little Damp", "Her Mysterious Charm", "Convinced", "His Dilemma", "Something for Baby" (poem), "Some Day", "A Green Hand", "A Righteous Outburst", "Getting at the Facts", "Just for a Change" (poem), "Too Wise", "A Fatal Error", "Prompt" (poem), "An Opportunity Declined", "Correcting a Great Injustice", "A Startling Demonstration", "Leap Year Advice" (article), "After Supper", "His Only Opportunity", "Getting Acquainted", "Answers to Inquiries" (article), "City Peril", "Hush Money", "Relieved", "No Time to Lose", "A Villainous Trick", "A Forced March" (poem), "Book Review" (article), "A Conditional Pardon", "Inconsistency" (poem), "Bill Nye", "To a Portrait" (poem), "A Guarded Secret", "A Pastel", "Jim" (poem), "Board and Ancestors", "An X-Ray Fable", "A Universal Favorite", "Spring" (poem), "The Sporting Editor on Culture", "A Question of Direction", "The Old Farm" (poem), "Willing to Compromise", "Ridiculous", "Guessed Everything Else", "The Prisoner of Zembla", "Lucky Either Way", "The Bad Man", "Slight Mistake", "Delayed", "A Good Story Spoiled", "Revenge", "No Help for It", "Riley's Luck" (poem), "Not So Much a Tam Fool", "A Guess-Proof Mystery Story", "Futility" (poem), "Wounded Veteran", "Her Ruse", "Why Conductors Are Morose", "The Pewee" (poem), "'Only to Lie-'" (poem), "The Sunday Excursionist", "Decoration Day", "Charge of the White Brigade" (poem), "An Inspiration", "Coming To Him", "His Pension", "Winner", "Hungry Henry's Ruse", "A Proof Of Love" (poem), "One Consolation", "An Unsuccessful Experiment", "Superlatrives" (poem), "By Easy Stages", "Even Worse", "The Shock", "The Cynic", "Speaking of Big Winds", "An Original Idea", "Calculations", "A Valedictory", "Solemn Thoughts", "Explaining It", "Her Failing", "A Disagreement", "An E for a Knee" (poem), "The Unconquerable" (poem), "An Expensive Veracity", "Grounds for Uneasiness", "It Covers Errors" (poem), "Recognition", "His Doubt", "A Cheering Thought", "What It Was", "Vanity" (poem), "Identified", "The Apple", "How It Started", "How Red Conlin Told the Widow", "Why He Hesitated", "Turkish Questions" (poem), "Somebody Lied", "Marvelous", "The Confession of a Murderer", "Get Off the Earth" (poem), "The Stranger's Appeal", "The Good Boy", "The Colonel's Romance", "A Narrow Escape", "A Year's Supply", "Eugene Field" (poem), "Slightly Mixed", "Knew What Was Needed", "Some Ancient News Notes" (article), "A Sure Method"
- O. Henry Encore (1939), collection of 27 short stories, 7 sketches and 10 poems:
  1. Part one. Stories: "A Night Errant", "In Mezzotint", "The Dissipated Jeweller", "How Willie Saved Father", "The Mirage on the Frio", "Sufficient Provocation", "The Bruised Reed", "Paderewski's Hair", "A Mystery of Many Centuries", "A Strange Case", "Simmons' Saturday Night", "An Unknown Romance", "Jack the Giant Killer", "The Pint Flask", "An Odd Character", "A Houston Romance", "The Legend of San Jacinto", "Binkley's Practical School of Journalism", "A New Microbe", "Vereton Villa", "Whisky Did It", "Nothing New Under the Sun", "Led Astray", "A Story for Men", "How She Got in the Swim", "The Barber Talks", "Barber Shop Adventure"
  2. Part two. Sketches: "Did You See the Circus", "Thanksgiving Remarks", "When the Train Comes in", "Christmas Eve", "New Year's Eve and Now it Came to Houston", "'Watchman, What of the Night?'", "Newspaper Poets"
  3. Part three. Newspaper Poetry: "Topical Verse", "Cap Jessamines", "The Cricket", "My Broncho", "The Modern Venus", "Celestial Sounds", "The Snow", "Her Choice", "'Little Things, but Ain't They Whizzers?'", "Last Fall of the Alamo"

Uncollected short stories:

- "Tictocq, the Great French Detective" (1894)
- "Tictocq, the Great French Detective; or, A Soubrette's Diamonds" (1894)
- "A Blow All 'Round" (1895)
- "A Chicago Proposal" (1895)
- "A Fishy Story" (1895)
- "A Foretaste" (1895)
- "A Literal Caution" (1895)
- "A Philadelphia Diagnosis" (1895)
- "A Thousand Dollar Poem, was what the Literary Judgment of the Business Manager Lost for the Paper" (1895)
- "All Right" (1895)
- "And Put Up a Dime" (1895)
- "Arrived" (1895)
- "As Her Share" (1895)
- "Ballad of the Passionate Eye" (1895)
- "Cheaper in Quantities" (1895)
- "Didn't Want Him Back" (1895)
- "Do You Know?" (1895)
- "Enlarging His Field" (1895)
- "Entirely Successful" (1895)
- "Extremes Met" (1895)
- "False to His Colors" (1895)
- "Family Pride" (1895)
- "He Was Behind With His Board" (1895)
- "Her Reckoning" (1895)
- "His Last Chance" (1895)
- "Making the Most of It" (1895)
- "Might Be" (1895)
- "Military or Millinery?" (1895)
- "No Chestnuts Were Served" (1895)
- "No Earlier" (1895)
- "Not Hers" (1895)
- "Not Official Statistics, However" (1895)
- "Palmistry" (1895)
- "Prodigality" (1895)
- "Professional, But Doubtful" (1895)
- "Prudent Precautions" (1895)
- "Same Thing" (1895)
- "Self Conceit" (1895)
- "Silver Question Settled" (1895)
- "Sunday Journalism, Memoranda of the Sabbath Editor of the New York Daily for Next Sunday's Contents" (1895)
- "The Fate It Deserved" (1895)
- "The Man at the Window" (1895)
- "The Modern Kind" (1895)
- "The New Hero" (1895)
- "The Odor Located" (1895)
- "The Teacher Taught" (1895)
- "The White Feather" (1895)
- "Uncle Sam's Wind" (1895)
- "Whole Handfuls" (1895)
- "Will She Fight as She Jokes? Here Are Some Translations of Recent Spanish Humour" (1895)
- "Yellow Specials, Latest Style of News Write Ups adopted by the sulphur-hued journals" (1895)
- "A Tragedy" (1896, as The Postman)
- "At an Auction" (1896)
- "Telegram" (1896)
- "His Courier" (1902)
- "The Flag" (1902)
- "The Guardian of the Scutcheon" (1903, as Olivier Henry)
- "The Lotus and the Cockleburrs" (1903)
- "The Point of the Story" (1903, as Sydney Porter)
- "The Quest of Soapy" (1908)
- "A Christmas Pi" (1909, as O. H-nry)
- "Adventures in Neurasthenia" (1910)
- "Last Story" (1910)

=== Poems ===
Uncollected poems:

- "Already Provided" (1895)
- "Archery" (1895)
- "At Cockcrow" (1895)
- "Honeymoon Vapourings" (1895)
- "Never, Until Now" (1895)
- "Ornamental" (1895)
- "The Imported Brand" (1895)
- "The Morning glory" (1895)
- "The White Violet" (1895)
- "To Her" (XRay) Photograph" (1895)
- "Unseeing" (1895)
- "Promptings" (1899)
- "Sunset in the Far North" (1901)
- "The Captive" (1901)
- "Uncaptured Joy" (1901)
- "April" (1903)
- "Auto Bugle Song" (1903)
- "June" (1903)
- "Remorse" (1903)
- "Spring in the City" (1903)
- "To a Gibson Girl" (1903)
- "Two Chapters" (1903)
- "A Floral Valentine" (1905)

=== Non-fiction ===
- Later Definitions (1895)
- The Reporter's Private Lexicon (1903)
- Letter 1883 (1912)
- Letters 1884, 1885 (1912)
- Letters 1905 (1914)
- Letters from Prison to his Daughter Margaret (1916)
- Letter 1901 (1917)
- Letters (1921)
- Letters to Lithopolis: from O. Henry to Mabel Wagnalls (1922)
- Letters (1923)
- Letter (1928)
- Letters 1906, 1909 (1931)
- Letters, etc. of 1883 (1931)
