= The Cop and the Anthem =

1904 short story by O. Henry

- Short story by O. Henry
- Genre: Short story

Publication
- Publication date: 1904
- Publication place: United States

"The Cop and the Anthem" is a December 1904 short story by the United States author O. Henry. It includes several of the classic elements of an O. Henry story, including a setting in New York City, an empathetic look at the state of mind of a member of an underprivileged class, and an ironic ending.

== Plot summary ==
"The Cop and the Anthem" has only one named character, the protagonist "Soapy." It is made clear that Soapy is homeless, one of the underclass men and women who flocked to New York City during the earliest years of the twentieth century.

The short story's narrative is set in an unstated day in late fall. Soapy faces the urgent necessity of finding some sort of shelter for the winter. He is psychologically experienced in thinking of Blackwell's Island, the local jail, as a de facto winter homeless shelter, and the narrative shows him developing a series of tactics intended to encourage the police to classify him as a criminal and arrest him.

Soapy's ploys include swindling a restaurant into serving him an expensive meal, vandalizing the plate-glass window of a luxury shop, repeating his eatery exploit at a humble diner, sexually harassing a young woman, pretending to be publicly intoxicated, and stealing another man's umbrella.

However, all of these attempts are quickly exposed as failures. The upper-class restaurant looks at Soapy's threadbare clothes and refuses to serve him. A police officer responds to the broken window but decides to pursue an innocent bystander. The diner refuses to have Soapy arrested, and instead has two servers throw Soapy out onto the concrete pavement.

Soapy's failures to earn his desired arrest continue. The young woman, far from feeling harassed, proves to be more than ready for action. Another police officer observes Soapy impersonating a drunk and disorderly man, but assumes that the exhibitionistic conduct is that of a Yale student celebrating a victory over "Hartford College" in football. Finally, the victim of the umbrella theft relinquishes the item without a struggle.

Based on these events, Soapy despairs of his goal of getting arrested and imprisoned. With the autumn sun gone and night having fallen, Soapy lingers by a small Christian church, considering his plight.

As O. Henry describes events, the small church has a working organ and a practicing organist. As Soapy listens to the church organ play an anthem, he experiences a spiritual epiphany in which he resolves to cease to be homeless, end his life as a tramp afflicted with unemployment, and regain his self-respect. Soapy recalls that a successful businessman had once offered him a job. Lost in a reverie, Soapy decides that on the very next day he will seek out this potential mentor and apply for employment.

As Soapy stands on the street and considers this plan for his future, however, a "cop" (policeman) taps him on the shoulder and asks him what he is doing. When Soapy answers "Nothing," his fate is sealed: he has been arrested for loitering. In the magistrate's court on the following day, he is convicted of a misdemeanor and is sentenced to three months in Blackwell's Island, the New York City jail.

== Cultural references ==
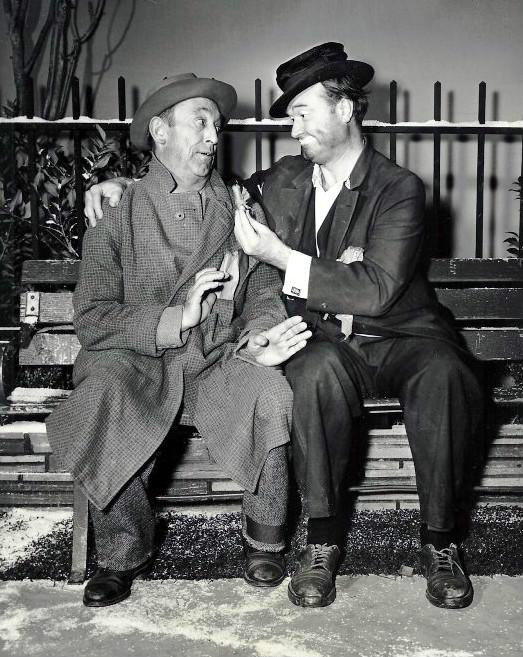
Red Skelton as Freddie the Freeloader (right) with Allen Jenkins as his friend, Muggsie, in a 1958 enactment of the story on Skelton's television program.

In February 1909, less than five years after the story's initial publication, O. Henry's work was adapted to the film Trying to Get Arrested, which was directed by D. W. Griffith, produced by the Biograph Company of New York, and released on April 5, 1909. A short film released by Vitagraph Studios in 1917 titled The Cop and the Anthem was directed by and starred Thomas R. Mills. The story was also adapted as a segment in the 1952 anthology film O. Henry's Full House directed by Henry Koster, from a screenplay by Lamar Trotti, and starring Charles Laughton, Marilyn Monroe, and David Wayne.

"The Cop and the Anthem" inspired an episode of The Red Skelton Show on December 21, 1954, with Skelton's "Freddie the Freeloader" character as the protagonist. Skelton also did another enactment of this story for his holiday program of December 23, 1958. The 1978 animated special The Pink Panther in: A Pink Christmas also borrows part of its plot from the story towards the special's end where, after many attempts of finding food, Pinky tries to get himself arrested to get a meal in jail.
