= Eltmann =

- Town
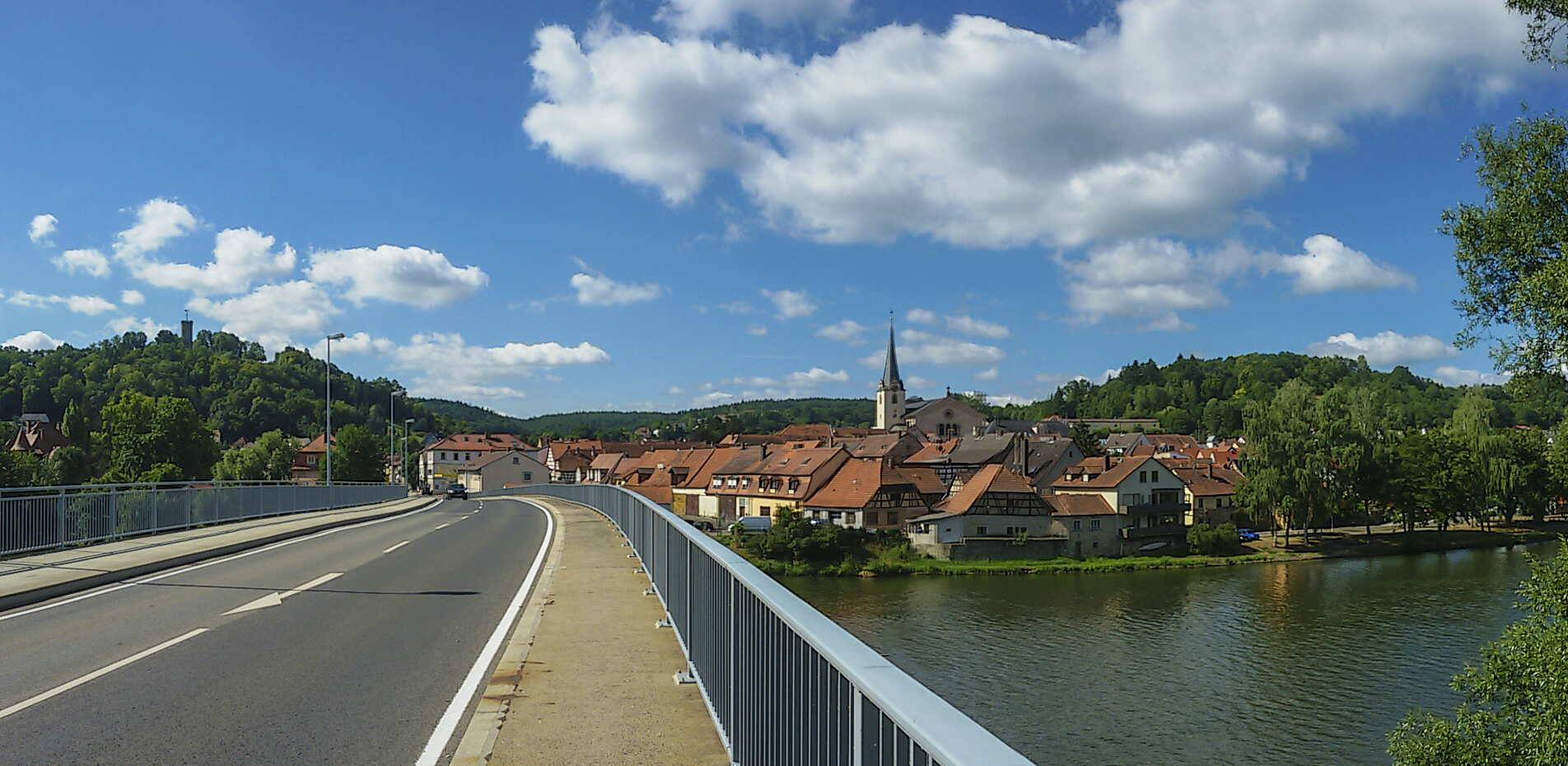
- Panorama view of Eltmann

- Coat of arms

- Location of Eltmann within Haßberge district
- Interactive map of Eltmann
- Location within Germany Location within Bavaria
- Coordinates: 49°58′N 10°40′E
- Country: Germany
- State: Bavaria
- Admin. region: Unterfranken
- District: Haßberge
- Subdivisions: 8 Stadtteile

Government
  - Mayor (2020–26): Michael Ziegler (CSU)

Area
  - Total: 40.75 km^{2} (15.73 sq mi)
- Elevation: 237 m (778 ft)

Population (2025-12-31)
  - Total: 5,304
  - Density: 130.2/km^{2} (337.1/sq mi)
- Time zone: UTC+01:00 (CET)
  - Summer (DST): UTC+02:00 (CEST)
- Postal codes: 97483
- Dialling codes: 09522
- Vehicle registration: HAS
- Website: www.eltmann.de

Eltmann (German pronunciation: [ˈɛltˌman]) is a town of 5256 inhabitants (in the Haßberge district of Lower Franconia, in Bavaria, Germany. It lies on the south bank of the Main river, 18 km (11 mi) west of Bamberg. It comprises the town proper, and its outlying districts, Dippach, Eschenbach, Limbach, Lembach, Roßstadt, and Weissbrunn, as well as an industrial district. Eltmann lies within the Naturpark Steigerwald. The German federal highway (Bundesstraße) 26 passes through town, and the German Main Valley Autobahn 70 has an interchange adjacent to town. Eltmann receives rail service from the German national railway system, Deutsche Bahn, at the Ebelsbach-Eltmann train station.

== Schools ==
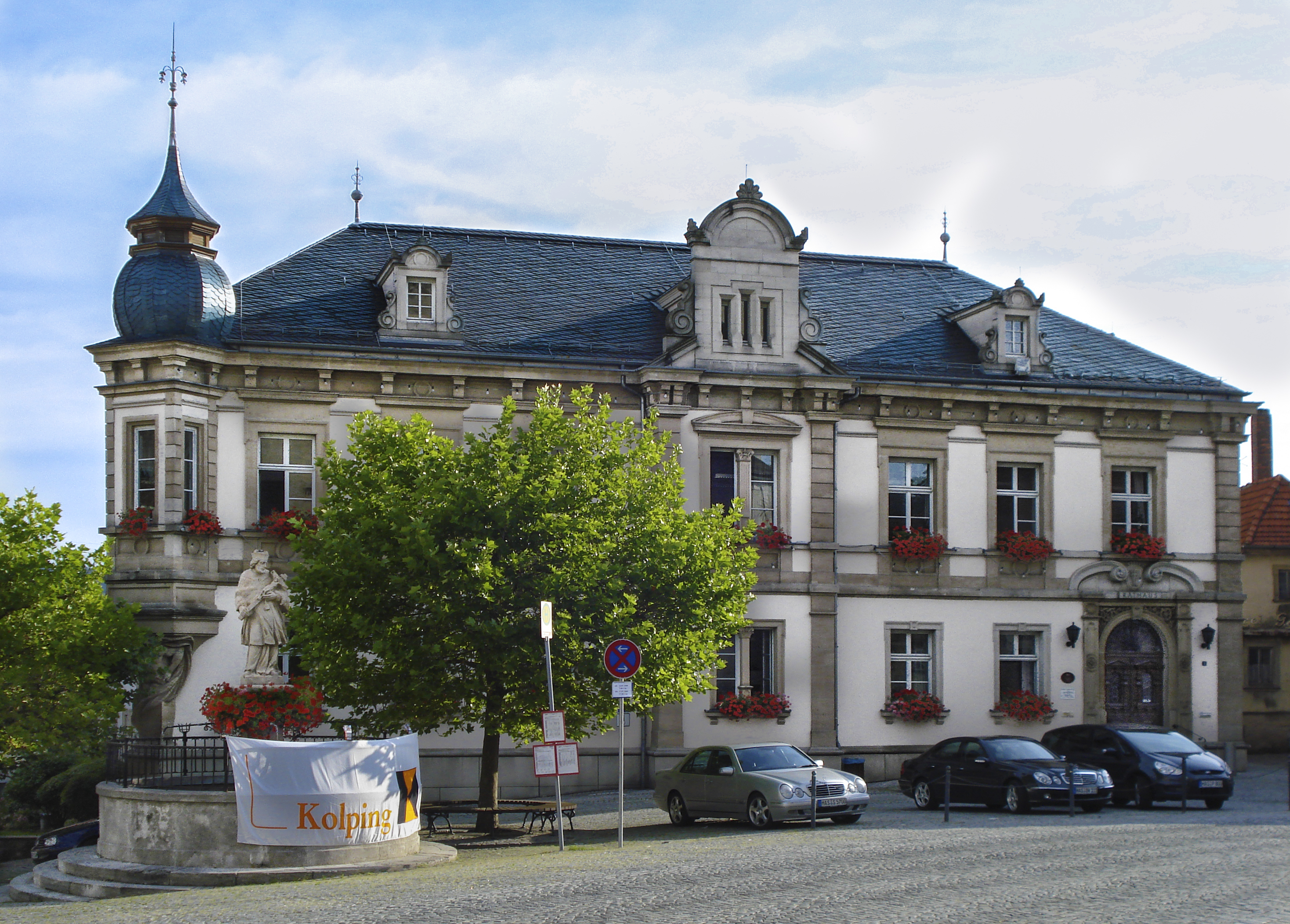
Rathaus Eltmann

Several Kindergartens, the Johann-Baptist-Graser Grundschule, the Wallburg Realschule, and the Georg-Göpfert-Hauptschule are located within the town.

== Tourism ==
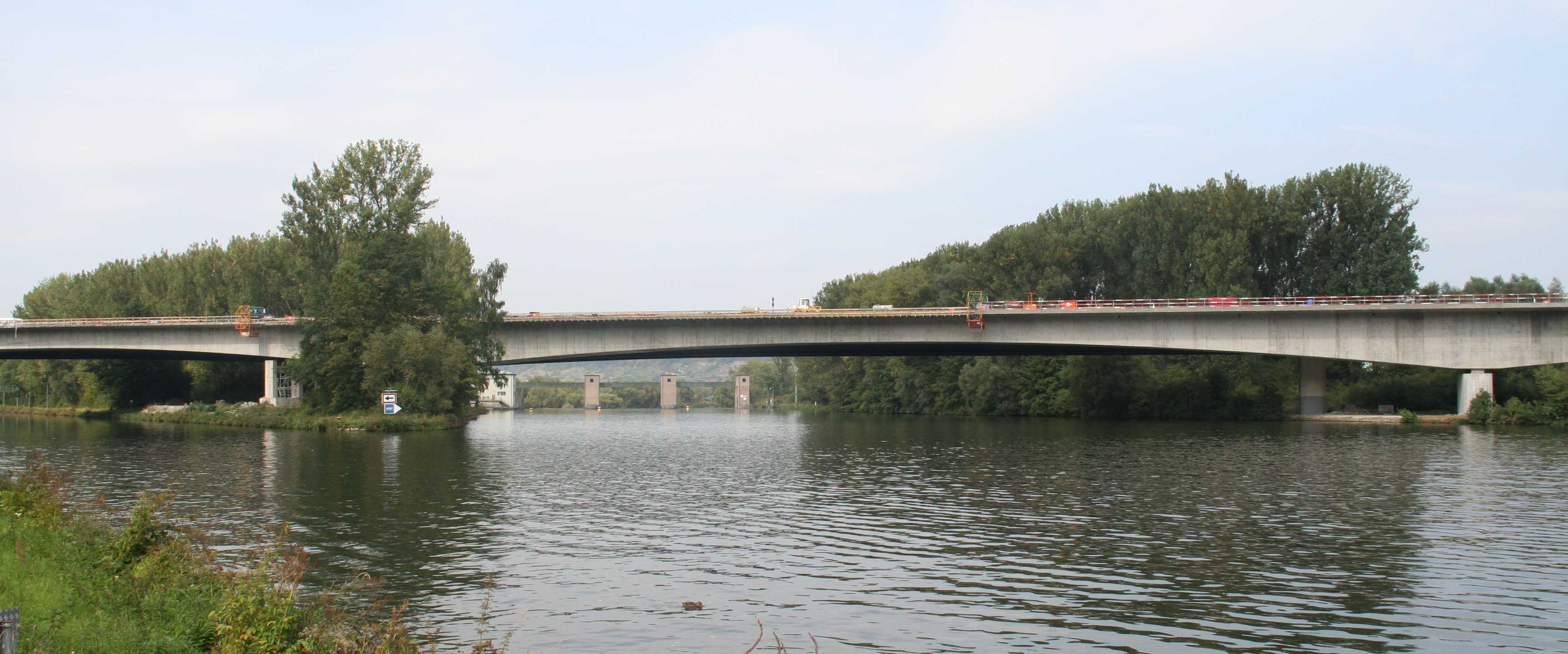
Autobahn A70 bridge over Main river near Eltmann

Eltmann lies within the Naturpark Steigerwald. The German federal highway (Bundesstraße) 26 passes through town, and the German Main Valley Autobahn 70 has an interchange adjacent to town. Eltmann receives rail service from the German national railway system, Deutsche Bahn, at the Ebelsbach-Eltmann train station.

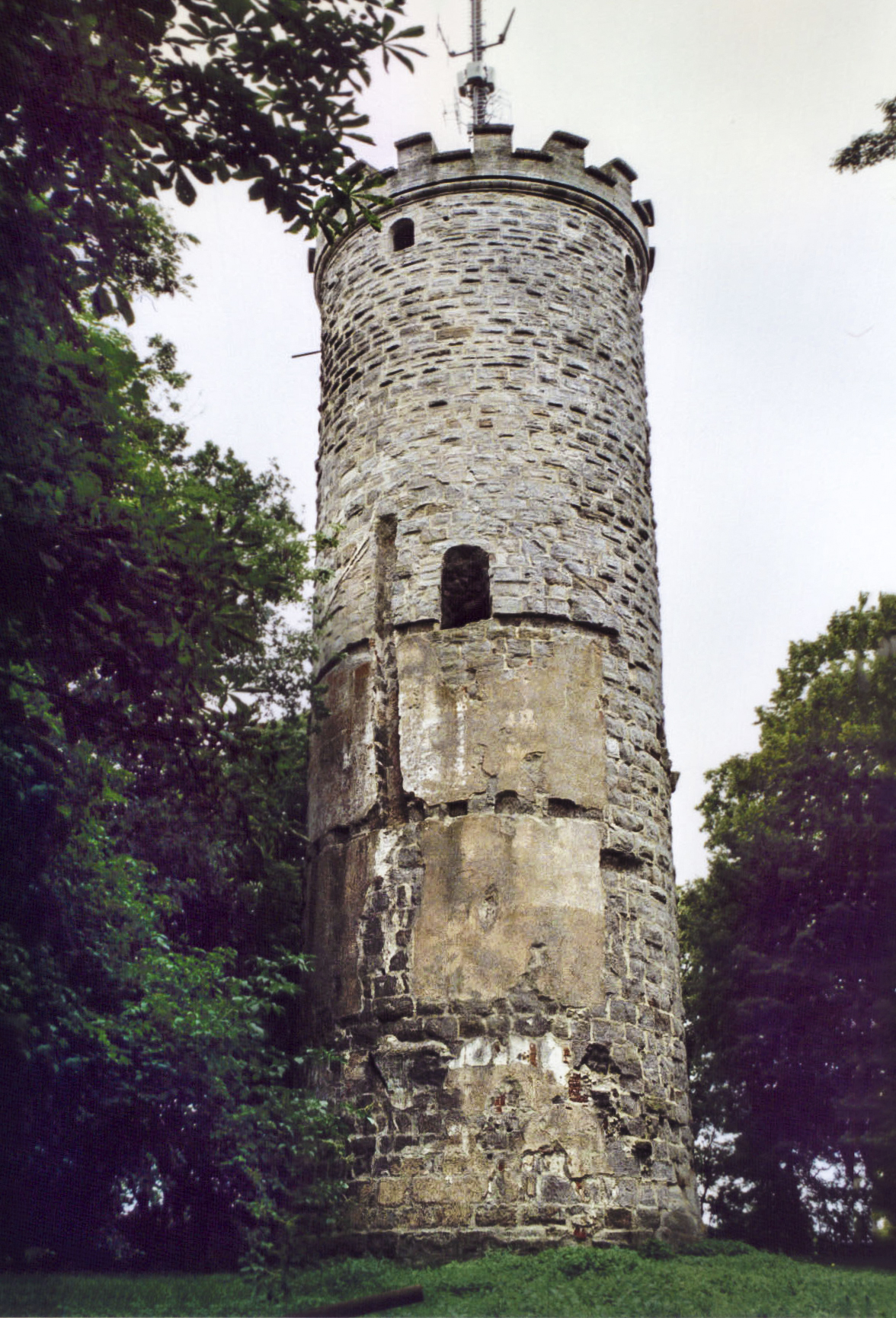
Wallburg tower

=== Wallburg ===
Originally a 43-meter-high watchtower dating from the 11th century attached by a bridge to an adjacent castle, the upper portion of the tower fell into disrepair following the destruction of the remainder of the castle. The present 27-meter height was established when the tower was repaired. The Wallburg offers a panoramic view of Eltmann, the Steigerwald and Main river valley, and the top is accessible via an internal staircase. From German Wikipedia: de:Burg Wallburg.

=== Parish church ===
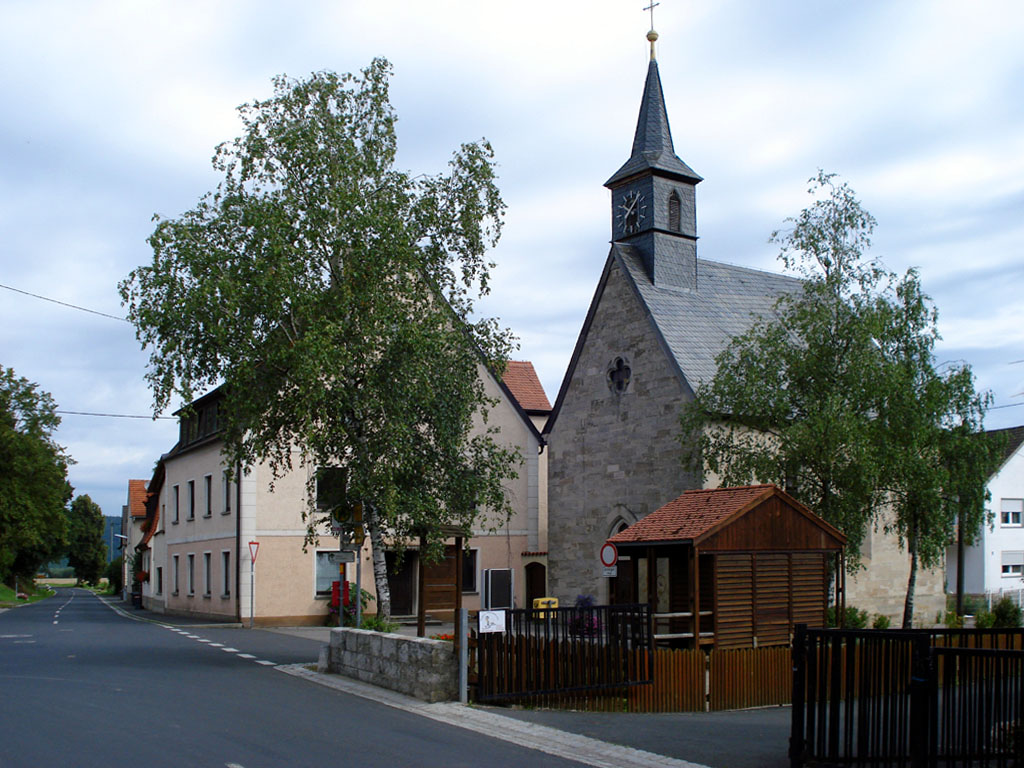
Dippach district

Begun in 1835, the current Roman Catholic parish church incorporates a portion of the original 14th-century church, whose foundations date back to the 11th century. The medieval stone carvings therein include the epitaphs of the Knights of the von Fuchs family.

=== The Church of the Visitation of Mary ===
Dedicated in the year 1755, the Wallfahrtskirche Mariaheimsuchung pilgrimage church in Limbach stands as the last major work of the architect, Balthasar Neumann . The stunning Rococo interior is complemented by the High Altar, a masterpiece completed in 1761 by the renowned sculptor Johann Peter Wagner. Adjacent to the church is found the Spring of Mercy, to which several miraculous cures have been attributed.

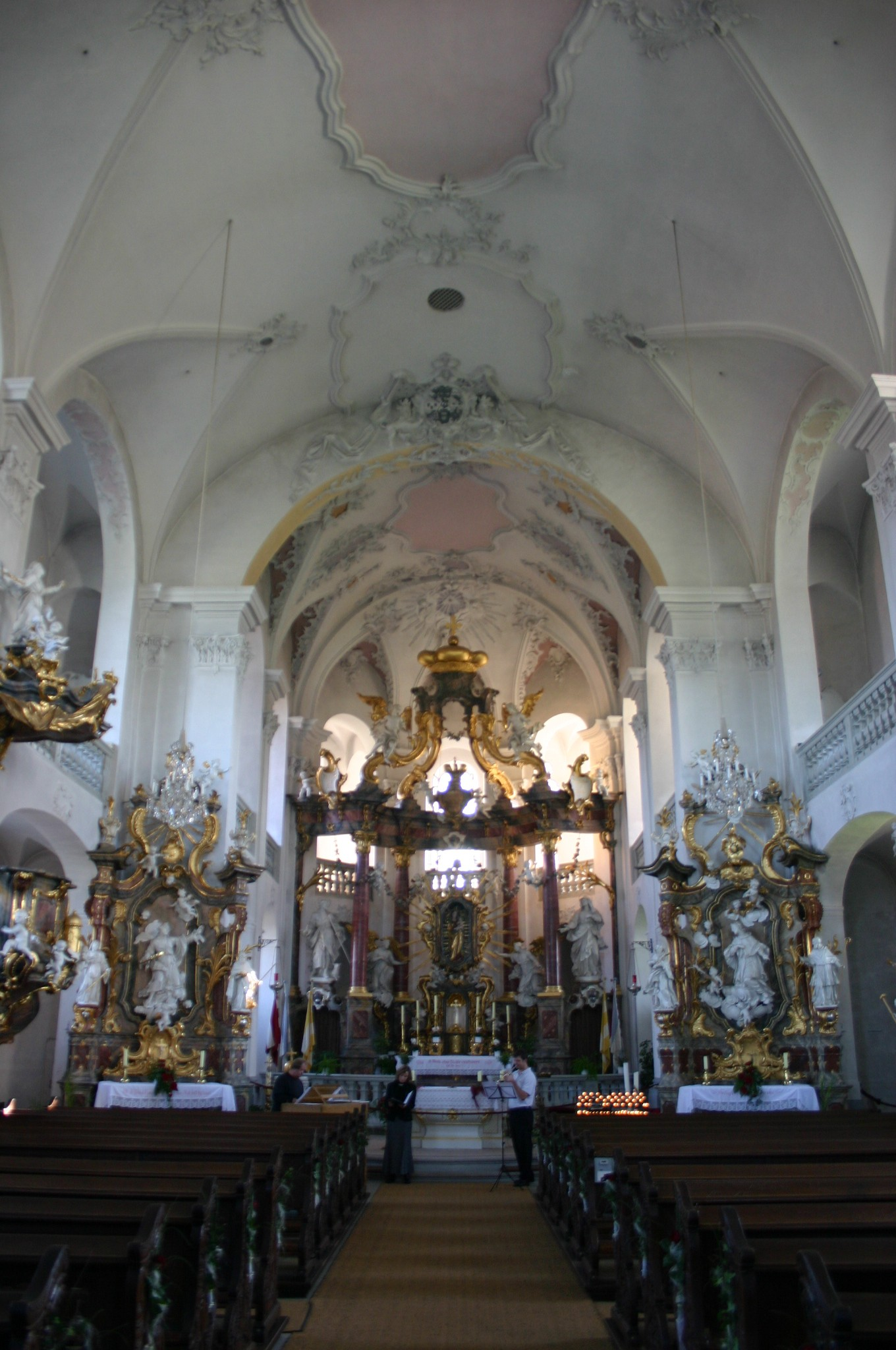
Interior of the Church of the Visitation of Mary

=== Municipal swimming pool ===
The Olympic-sized municipal swimming pool actually consists of several pools suitable for swimmers of all ages to enjoy. The surrounding lawn is shaded by chestnut trees, and a restaurant and tennis courts are adjacent.

=== Steigerwald ===
Kilometers of well-groomed trails winding through the hills of the Steigerwald, one of the German national parks, offer unlimited hiking and wildlife viewing opportunities.

=== Chapel of the Holy Cross ===
The Kreuzkapelle overlooks the graveyard. First completed in 1612, the chapel received a complete reconstruction in 1768. It was relocated to its current location in the graveyard in 1961.

=== Ölbergkapelle ===
This chapel, dating from the 13th century, is the oldest structure in town.

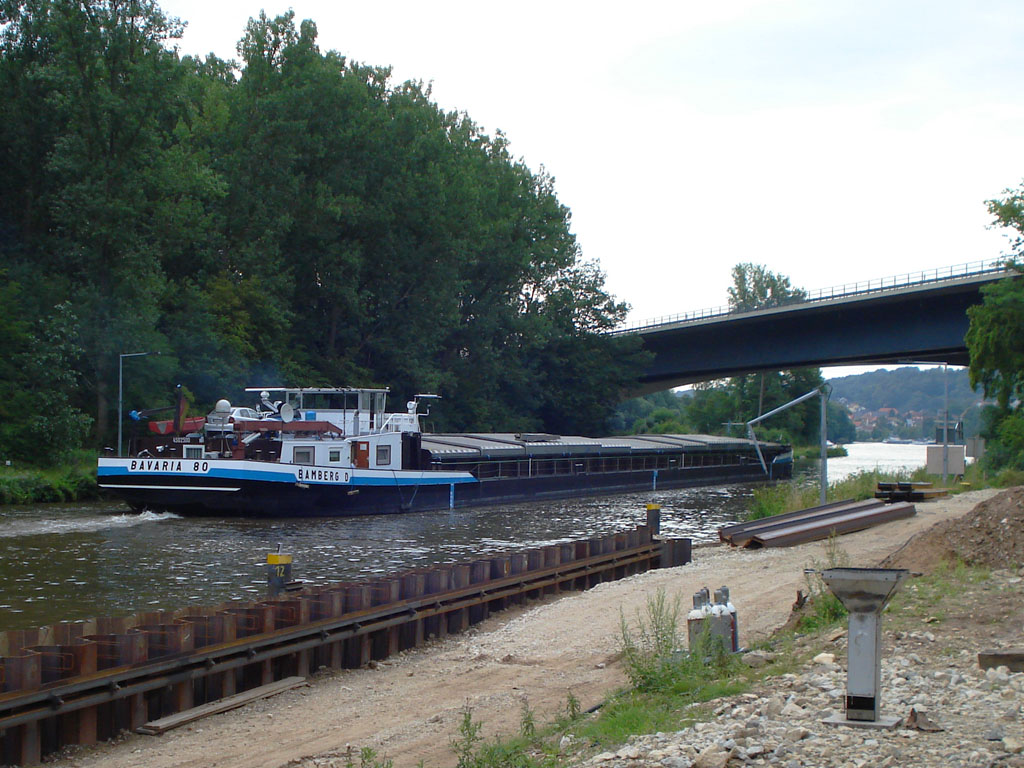
Main River near Stadtteil Limbach

== History ==
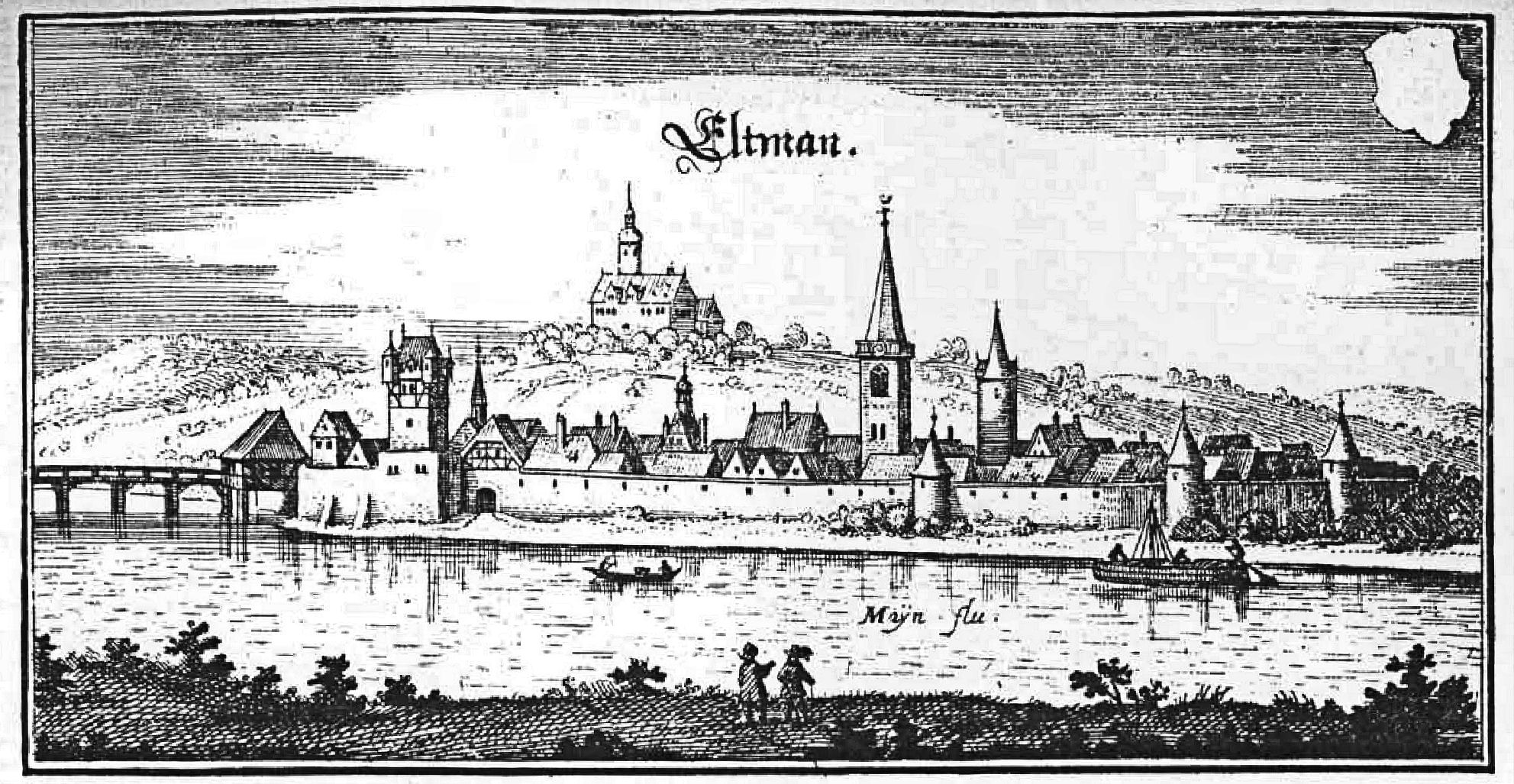
Historical view of Eltmann

Founded c. 741 during a period of expansion of civil administration and military fortifications in the Franconian region, Eltmann is first mentioned in 8th-century historical records as "Altimoin" or "Eltimoin", interpreted as "on the upper Main", or perhaps more appropriately as "by the old Main", perhaps denoting its location on a side channel of the Main river. Eltmann was granted rights as a town in 1335 during the reign of Holy Roman Emperor Ludwig the Bavarian. The first use of the spelling "Eltmann" appears in records from 1456, but the spelling was not finally standardized until the 17th century.

Although the town proper was largely spared any destruction during World War Two, a nearby ball bearing plant was attacked by American heavy bombers of the 92nd Bomb Group (H) on July 21, 1944, and severely damaged.

Eltmann celebrated its 650th anniversary in 1985.

=== Coat of arms ===
The earliest coat of arms of the town of Eltmann dates from the late 14th century, and comprised the red and white quartered shield of Würzburg. From 1512 onward the town seal added the man-at-arms, finally adding a T symbol (actually representing a Buechsengabel, a device used to support an arquebus or other early firearm) in the 19th century.

== Cultural activities ==
=== Breweries ===
Four breweries call Eltmann home, giving the town its nickname of the "Beer Town of the Steigerwald". In July, the town holds an annual beer festival, featuring live music and entertainment, food, and, of course, the local beers.

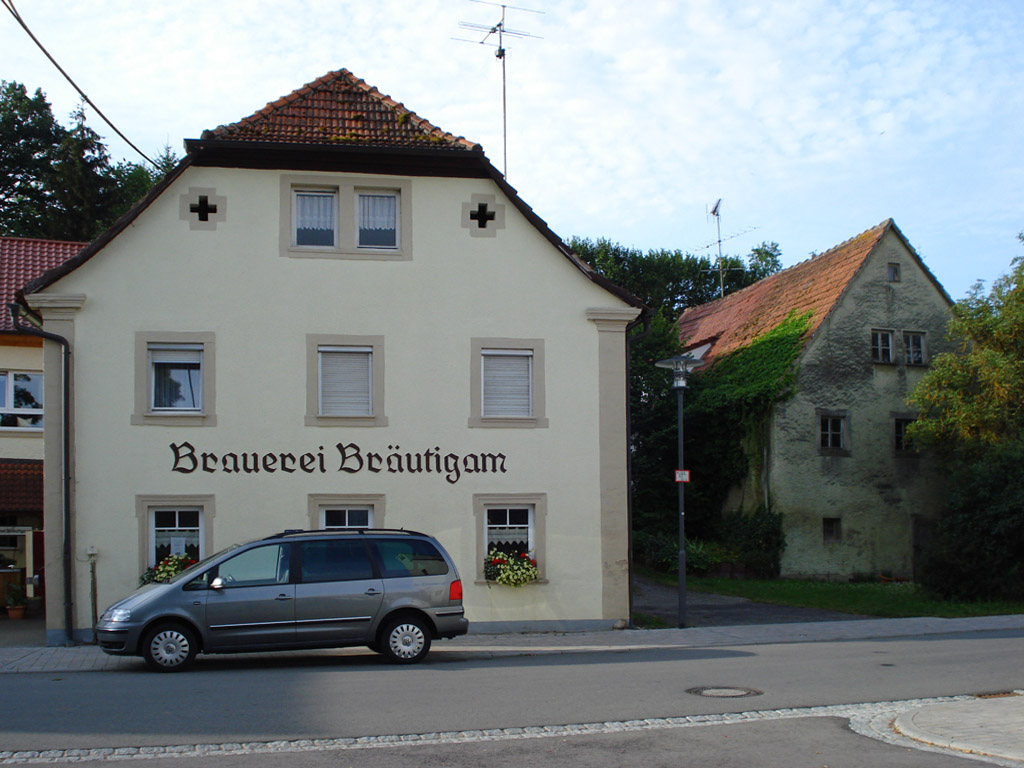
Brauerei Bräutigam in Stadtteil Weissbrunn

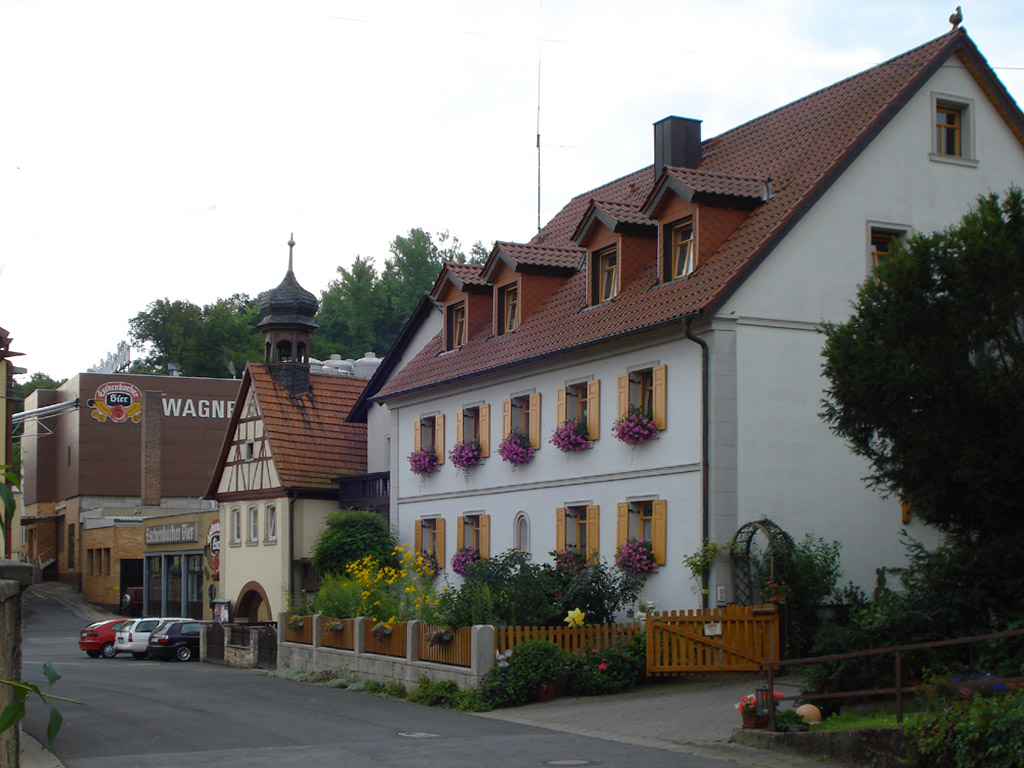
Stadtteil Eschenbach with Wagner Brewery in background

=== Heimatmuseum Eltmann ===
The local history museum provides interesting displays detailing the rich history of the town and area, including displays on daily life and local viniculture.

== Economy ==
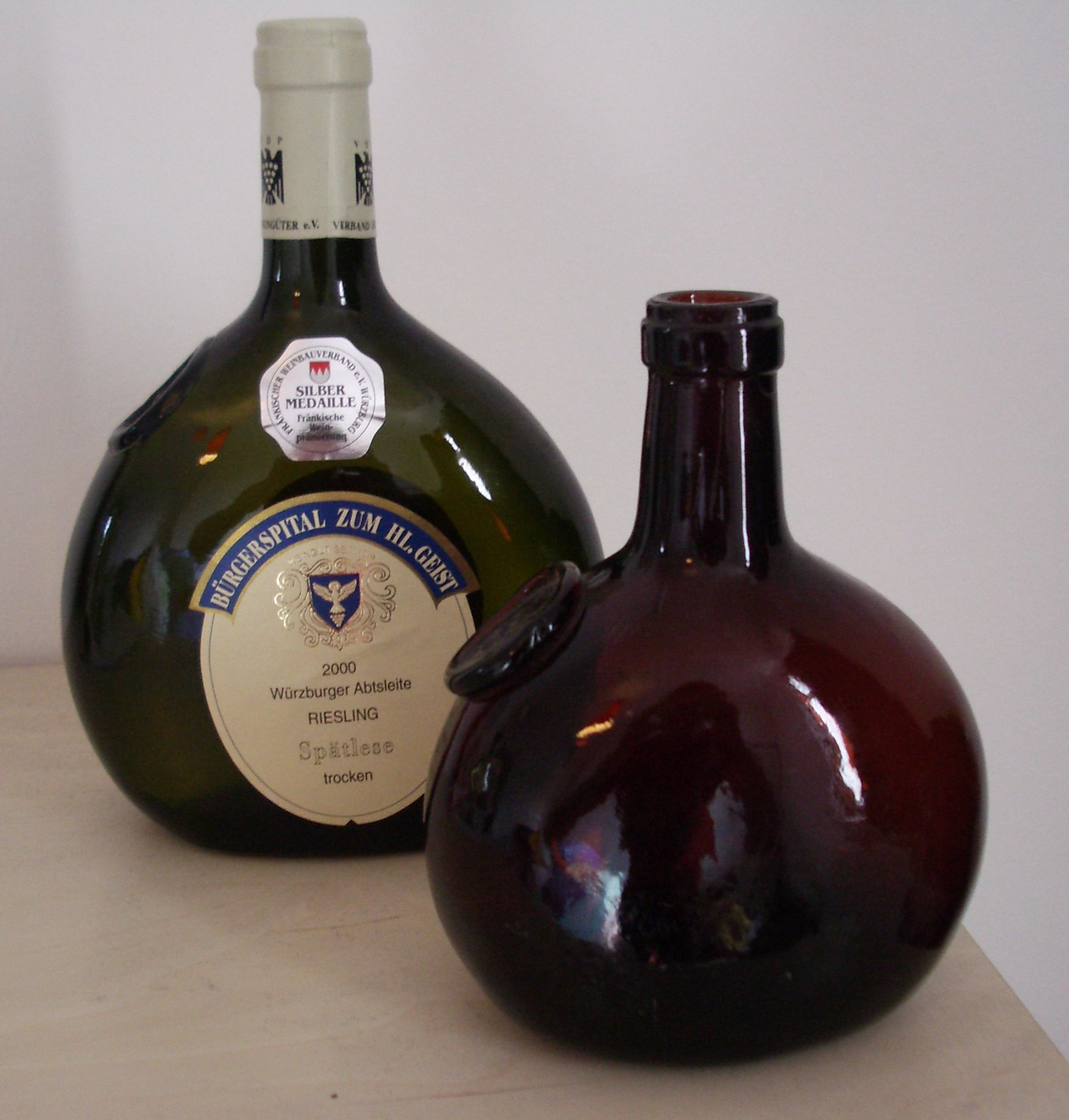
Franconian wine in bocksbeutel bottles

Eltmann has a diversified economy of agriculture, light manufacturing , retail and tourism.

=== Viniculture ===
Eltmann lies at the eastern border of the renowned Franconian wine-producing region. Franconian wines are known throughout Germany for their dryness, and have a spicy or earthy flavor. These wines are bottled in the distinctive, green, flagon-shaped bottle called the Bocksbeutel. The superior quality of these wines has ensured their popularity among Germans, and as a result little of the Franconian production is exported.
