= Garçon Wines =

British manufacturer of wine bottles

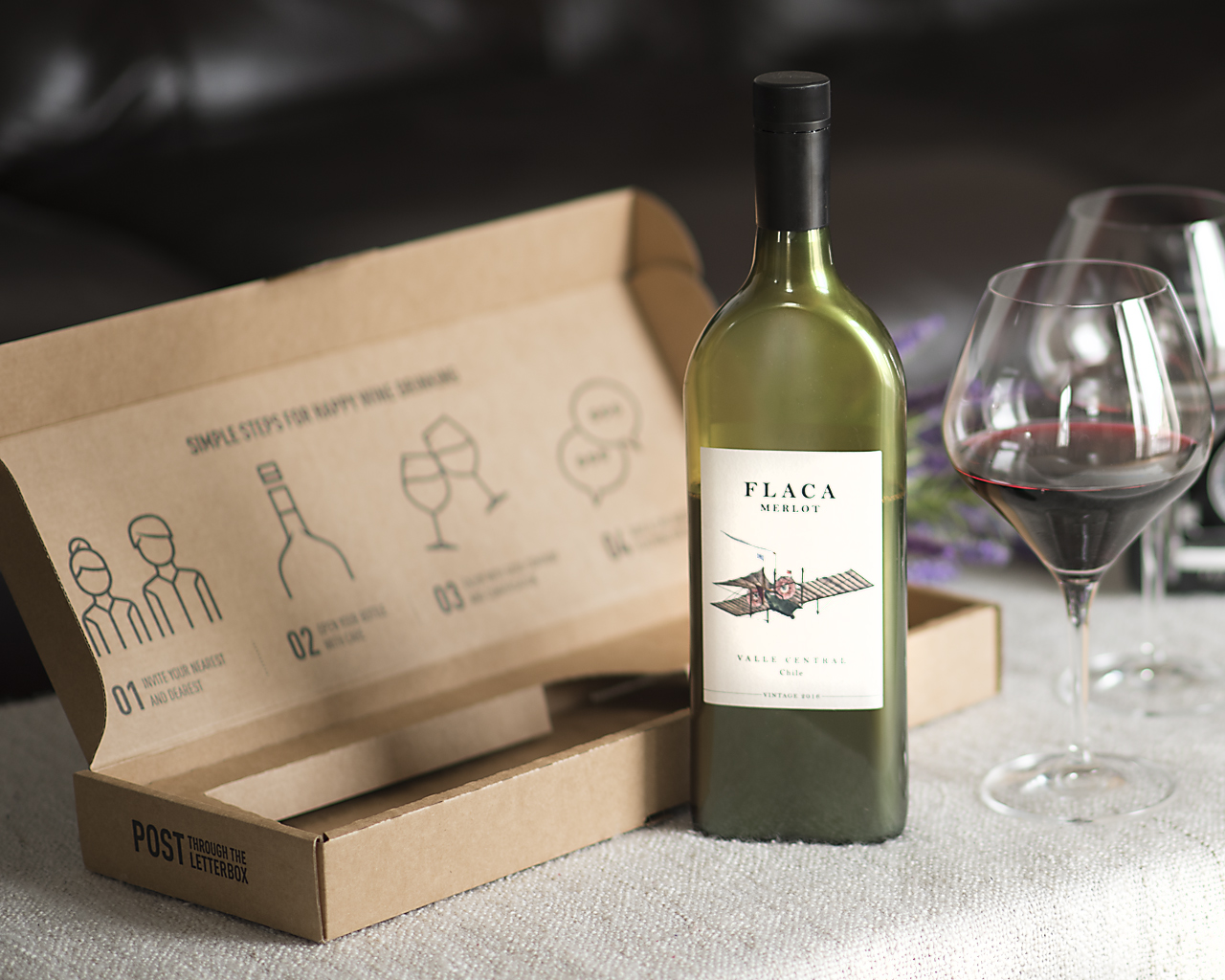
- Trade name: Garçon Wines
- Company type: Private
- Industry: Packaging activities Wholesale of wine Retail sale of wine delivered via mail
- Founded: 21 November 2016; 8 years ago in London, United Kingdom as Delivering Happiness Limited
- Founders: Joe Revell and Santiago Navarro
- Headquarters: London, U.K.
- Website: garconwines.com

Garçon Wines is a British manufacturer of wine bottles and related packaging. Founded in 2016, the company produces a wine bottle that, with its packaging, can fit through a letter box opening.

== History ==
The company was founded by Joe Revell and Santiago Navarro. Developing a flat wine bottle was not part of their original business plan, which was to be a consumer wine club. Revell's friend complained they could not have wine delivered easily as they were often away from home or in the office. He appeared on CNBC's show Pop Up Start Up in 2016, and was awarded £20,000 to start the business.

In 2017, Garçon Wines won the Best New Beverage Concept award at the World Beverage Innovation Awards and was a Diamond Finalist in the Awards for Packaging Innovation the following year.

== Product range ==
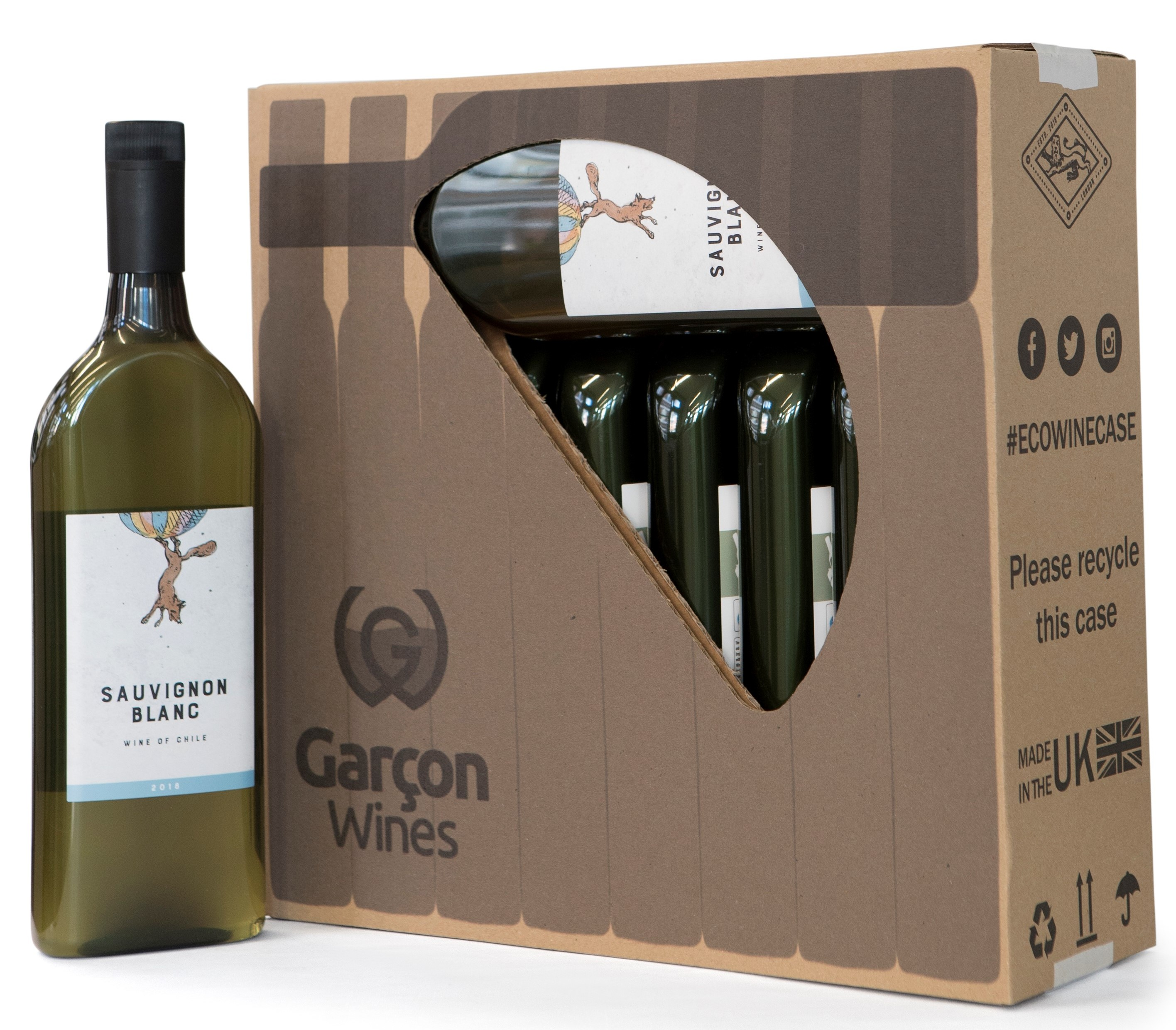
10-bottle pack

Garçon Wines manufactures full-sized bottles made from recycled polyethylene terephthalate, which were designed to fit through a letterbox. The company claims it is the first to design such a bottle. A bottle holds 750 millilitres (26 imp fl oz; 25 US fl oz), the same as a conventional wine bottle, but is around 2 centimetres (0.79 in) taller and is fully recyclable.

In 2019, Garçon Wines introduced a customised wine package that could accommodate ten of its bottles in the same space as four conventional ones. Eight bottles are packed vertically with the final two slotted into the neck space on either side of the row of eight, virtually eliminating dead space. This allows 1040 bottles to be stored in a standard container pallet, compared to 456 standard sized bottles, reducing the environmental footprint and cost for transport and handling. The same year, Garçon Wines partnered with Naked Wines, supplying the packaging.

== See also ==
- Bocksbeutel – a type of wine bottle with the form of a flattened ellipsoid
