= Shovel hat =

Style of hat formerly associated with the Anglican clergy

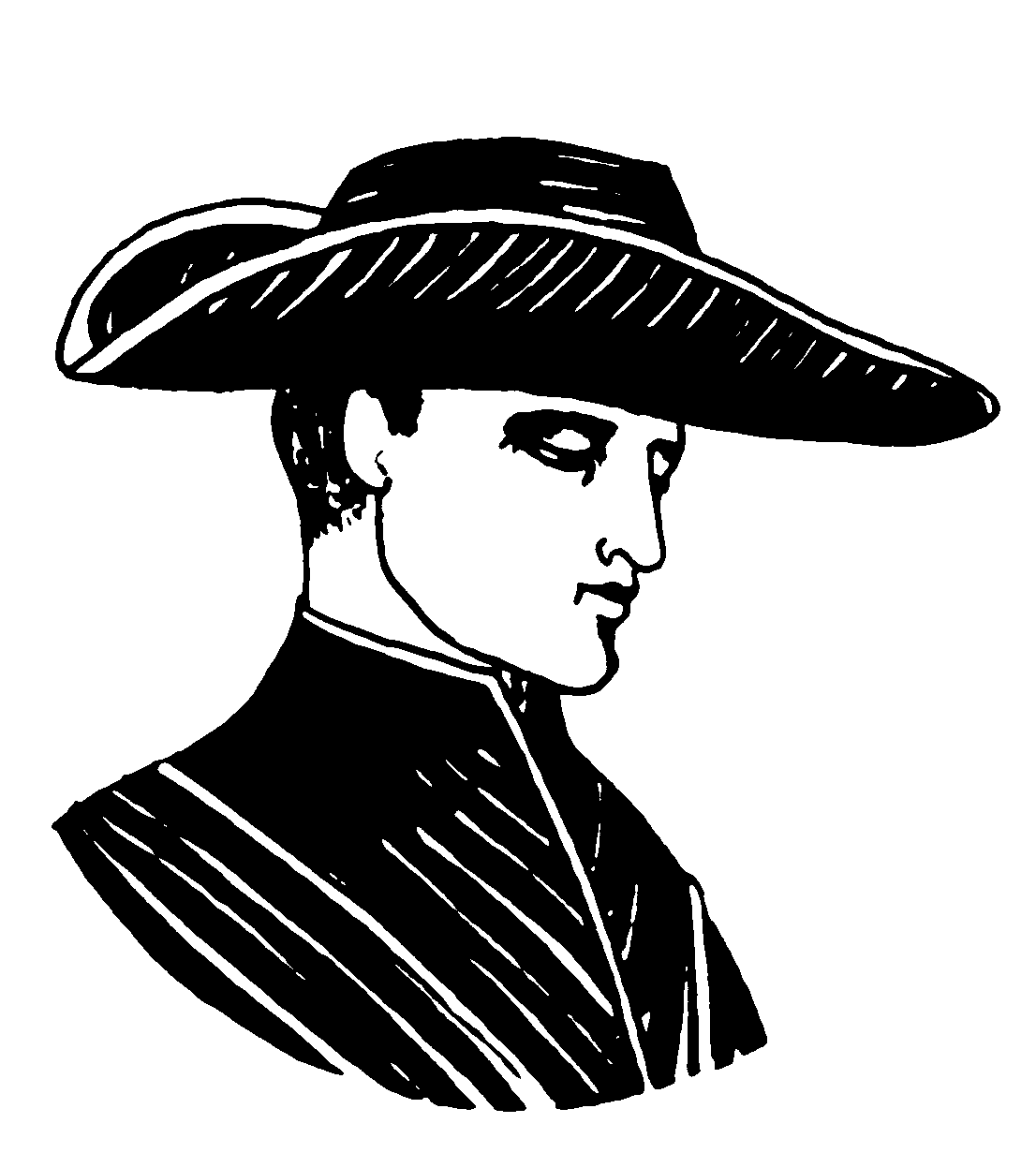
A shovel hat.

The shovel hat was a style of hat formerly associated with the Anglican clergy, particularly archdeacons and bishops.

== Description ==
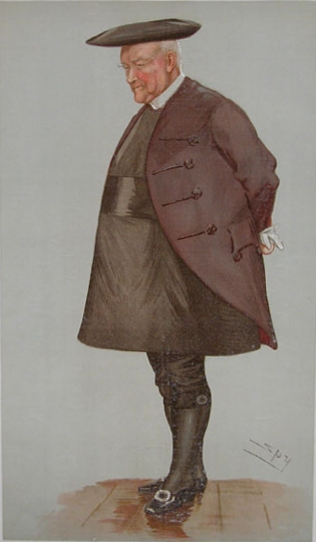
William Alexander, Archbishop of Armagh, caricatured in 1895, wearing a bishop's apron, gaiters and low-crowned shovel hat.

The hat was usually made of black beaver or felt, and had a low, round crown and a wide brim, which projected in a shovel-like curve at the front and rear and was often worn turned up at the sides. Like the tricorne it was a development of the low-crowned broad-brimmed hats fashionable in the later 17th century.

Along with the bishop's apron and gaiters, the shovel hat was an instantly recognisable accoutrement of senior Anglican clergy between the 18th and late 19th century, although it was also worn by parsons and less senior figures. By the mid 19th century it was already seen as somewhat traditionalist or old-fashioned: Thomas Carlyle coined the term "shovelhattery" to attack hidebound orthodoxy in the Church of England. The term "broad-brimmed", occasionally used to describe Anglican churchmen in the 19th century (particularly the Evangelical party) was also derived from the shovel hat.

In the 1848 novel Vanity Fair by William Makepeace Thackeray, the character Reverend Bute Crawley is described as a "tall, stately, jolly, shovel-hatted man".

In the 1849 novel Shirley by Charlotte Brontë, chapters 1 and 17, the clergyman Mr Helstone is described as wearing a "Rehoboam, or shovel hat".

In the 1855 novel The Warden by Anthony Trollope, the archdeacon, Dr Grantly, wears a shovel hat and in Chapter 6 it is suggested that the Bishop might be worried that should reformers get their way they could end up making shovel hats and other associated Anglican raiment illegal.

== See also ==
- List of hat styles
