= Wallburg Realschule =

Secondary school in Eltmann, Germany

Location
- Oskar-Serrand-Str. 29; Eltmann; Germany

Information
- Teaching staff: c.40
- Forms: 5-10
- Enrollment: c.650
- Website: rs-eltmann.de

Wallburg Realschule is a modern secondary school located in Eltmann, Germany, which is named after the local Wallburg castle ruins. The school is located on a hillside overlooking Eltmann, the Wallburg and the Main river. There are approximately 650 pupils and 40 teachers, who teach 23 different classes from Form 5 up to Form 10.

Pupils can play table tennis during breaks. Wallburg Realschule has a very large gymnasium, a playground and even a big pond. There is also a library especially for pupils, and an assembly hall which has a big stage for performances.

School starts at 7:55 am and usually ends at 1:00 pm, with optional afternoon classes. The Wallburg Realschule has three computer rooms and one laptop cart.

The school address is: "Realschule Wallburg, Oskar-Serrand-Str. 29, 97483 Eltmann"
