= Fifth (unit) =

Unit of volume used for wine and spirits

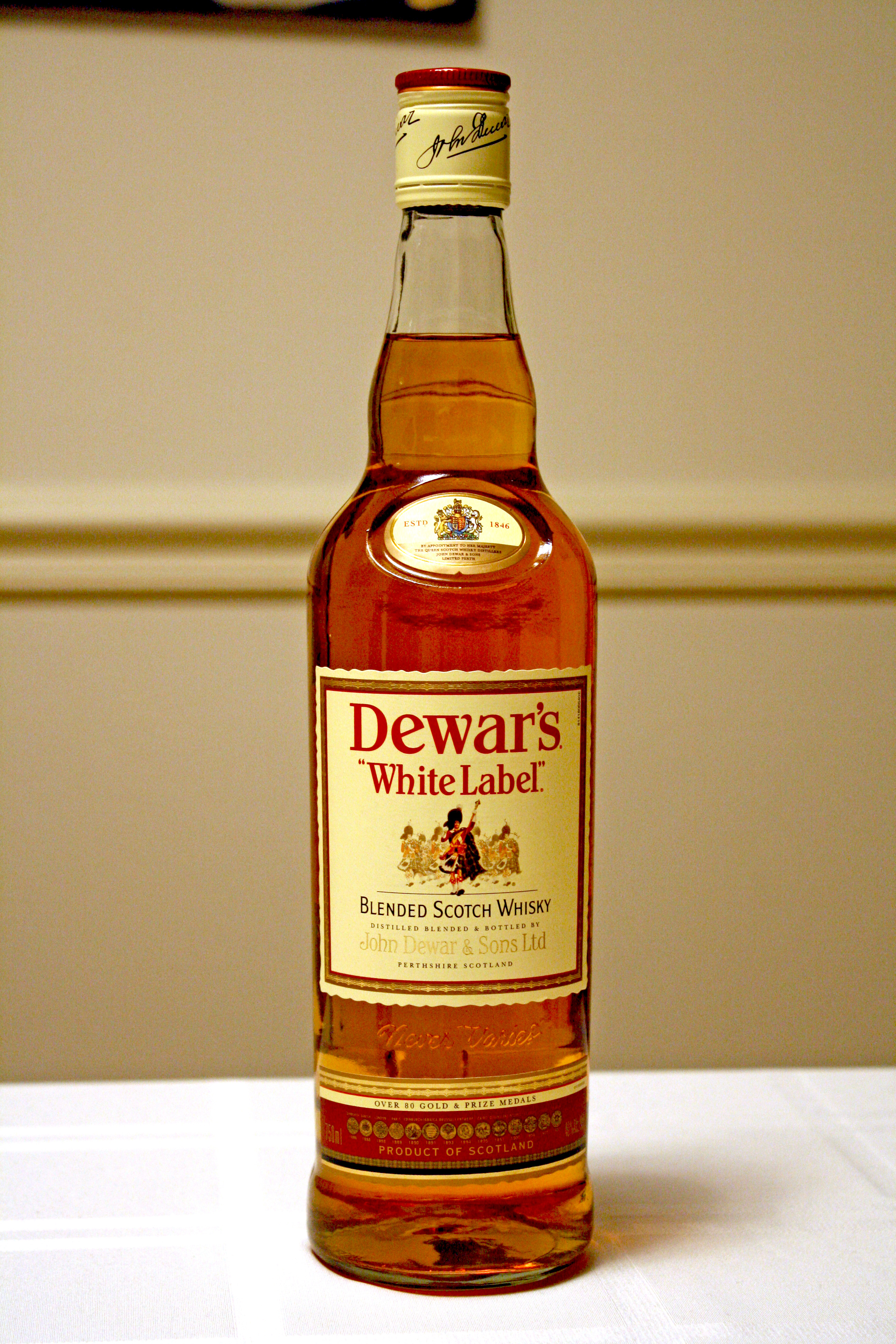
A metric fifth of Dewar's Scotch whisky

A fifth is a unit of volume formerly used for wine and distilled beverages in the United States, equal to one fifth of a US liquid gallon, or 25 3/5 U.S. fluid ounces (757 milliliters); it has been superseded by the metric bottle size of 750 mL, sometimes called a metric fifth, which is the standard capacity of wine bottles worldwide and is approximately 1% smaller.

== History ==
Before the mid-19th century, the capacity of British alcohol bottles used for wine and distilled liquors was nominally a quart, but the actual capacity varied considerably. Four primary styles existed, with different average capacities: 759 ± 27 mL (715–810 range); 781 ± 47 mL (724–880); 808 ± 49 mL (739–835); and at approximately 1130 mL, the "imperial wine quart". Beer and cider bottles also had a different range of sizes. In 1842, it was reported that ordinary wine bottles were 1/6 of an imperial gallon, that is, 758 mL.

After its independence, the United States continued some British measures including the "wine gallon" (which was used to define the U.S. liquid gallon) but did not adopt the Imperial gallon when it was introduced in 1824. In the late 19th century, liquor in the U.S. was often sold in bottles which appeared to hold one US quart (32 US fl oz; 950 mL), but in fact contained less than a quart and were called "fifths", "short quarts", or commercial quarts. At this time, one-fifth of a gallon was a common legal threshold for the difference between selling by the drink and selling by the bottle or at wholesale, and thus the difference between a drinking saloon or barroom and a dry-goods store.

The fifth was the usual size of bottle for distilled beverages in the United States until 1980. Other authorized units based on the fifth included 4/5 pint, called a tenth, and 1/10 pint. During the 1970s, there was a push for metrication of U.S. government standards. In 1975, the Bureau of Alcohol, Tobacco and Firearms, in cooperation with the Distilled Spirits Council of the United States, proposed metric-standard bottle sizes to take effect in January 1979, with a one-year changeover period in which both sets of sizes were legal; these standards were incorporated into Title 27 of the Code of Federal Regulations. These new sizes were 50 mL (a miniature), 100 mL, 200 mL, 375 mL (355 mL for cans), 500 mL (discontinued for distilled beverages in June 1989, but not for wine), 750 mL (the usual size of a wine bottle), 1 liter, and 1.75 liter (a metric half-gallon or "handle"). Wine also has a standard 187 mL (6.6 imp fl oz; 6.3 US fl oz) measure and uses 1.5 liters (a magnum) instead of 1.75.

== See also ==
- Alcohol measurements
