= Rehoboam (unit) =

Wine bottle size

Rehoboam (French name: réhoboam) was a UK bottle size for wine and champagne.

Also refer Wine bottle sizes.

== Definition ==
6 reputed quarts.

== Conversion ==
1 rehoboam = 6 reputed quarts

1 rehoboam = 1 UK gal

1 rehoboam = 0.004546092 m^{3}

== Other uses ==
In the 1849 novel Shirley by Charlotte Brontë, chapters 1 and 17, the clergyman Mr Helstone is described as wearing a "Rehoboam, or shovel hat".
