= Wine bottle =

Bottle used for holding wine

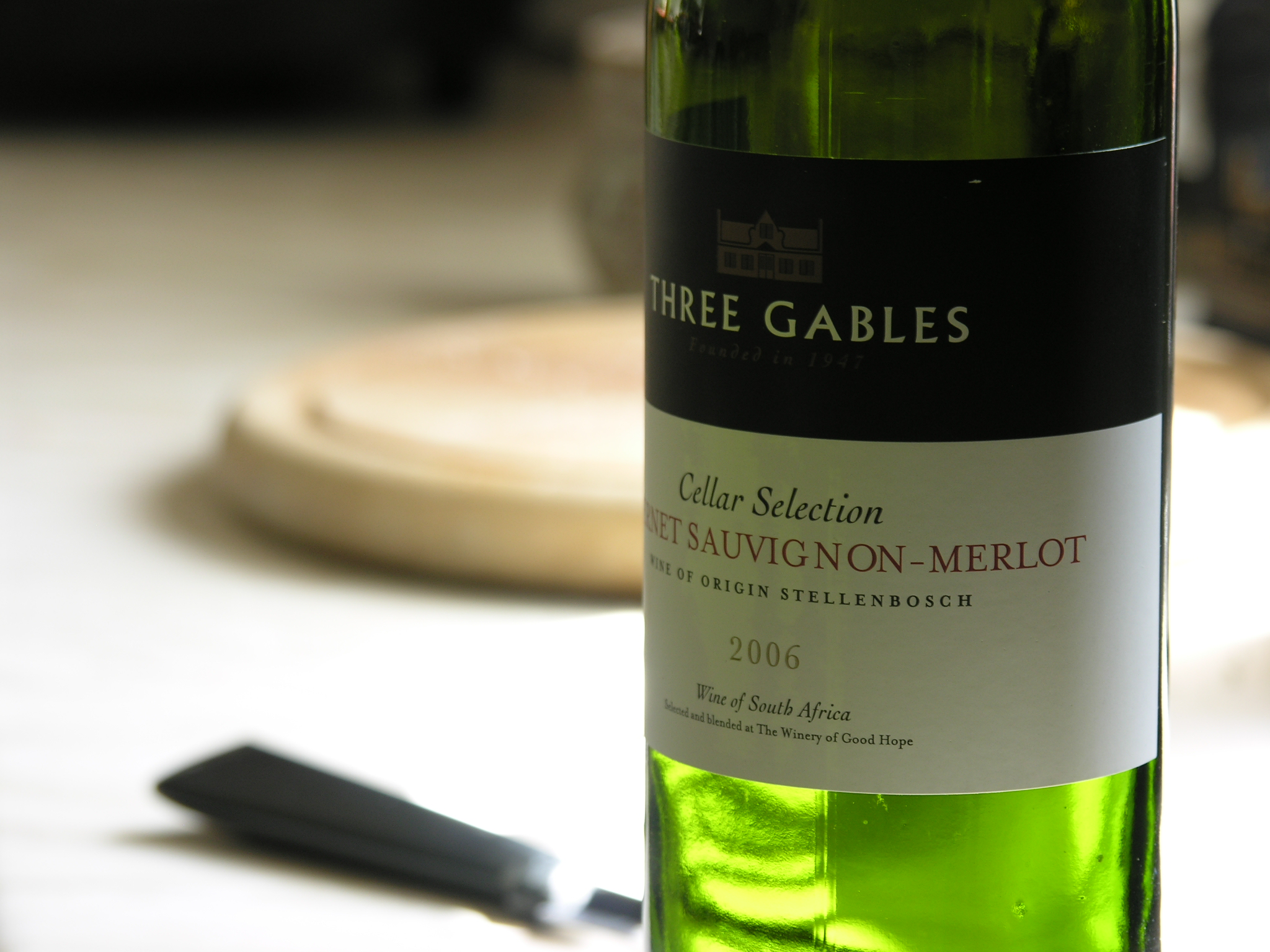
The transparent green of a typical wine bottle

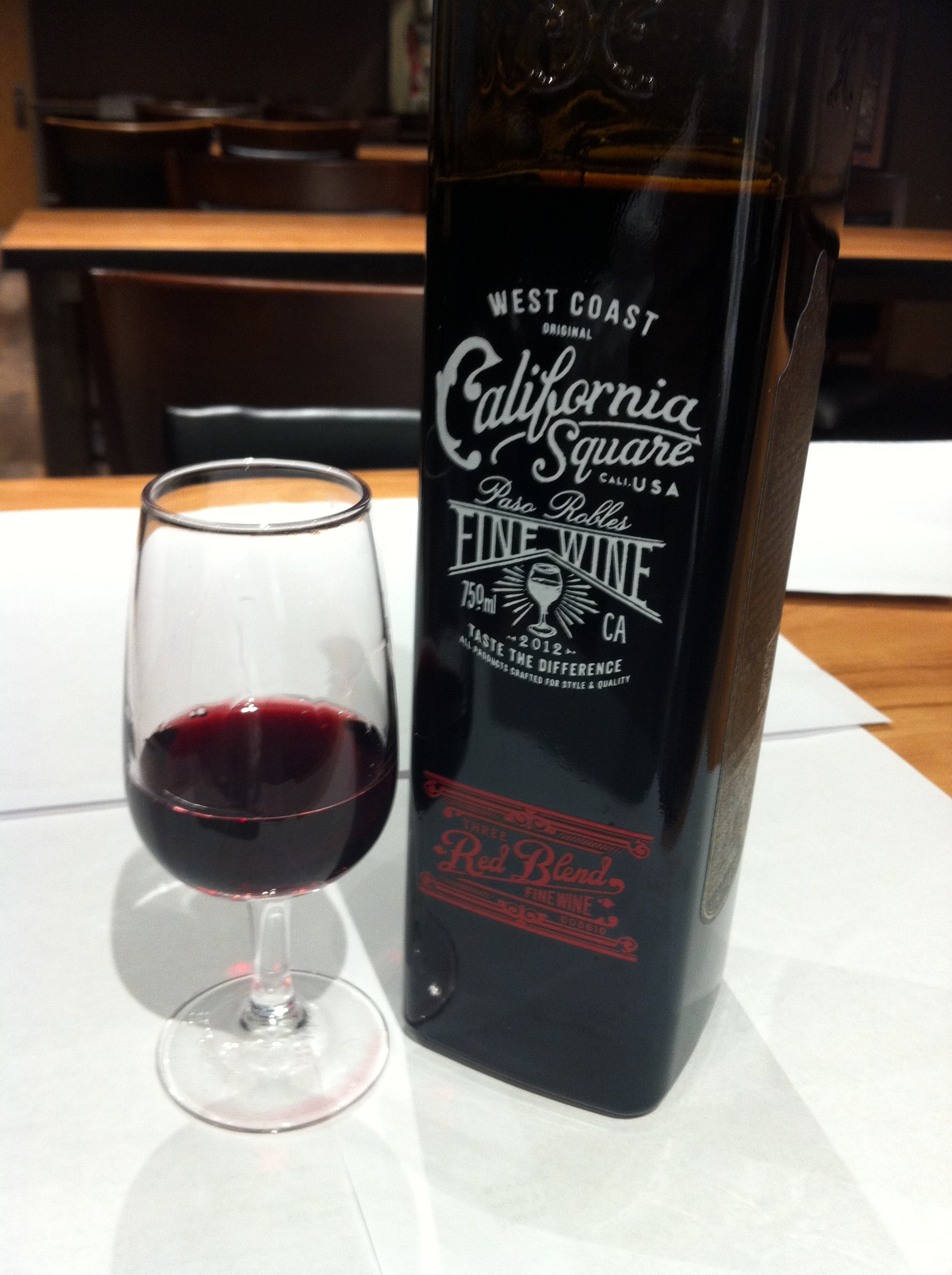
A square wine bottle

A wine bottle is a bottle, generally a glass bottle, that is used for holding wine. Some wines are fermented in the bottle while others are bottled only after fermentation. Recently the bottle has become a standard unit of volume to describe sales in the wine industry, measuring 750 millilitres (26.40 imp fl oz; 25.36 US fl oz). Wine bottles are produced, however, in a variety of volumes and shapes.

Wine bottles are traditionally sealed with a cork, but screw-top caps are becoming popular, and there are several other methods used to seal a bottle.

== Sizes ==
Many traditional wine bottle sizes are named for Biblical kings and historical figures. The chart below lists the sizes of various wine bottles in multiples relating to a standard bottle of wine, which is 0.75 litres (0.20 US gal; 0.16 imp gal) (six 125 mL servings). The "wineglassful"—an official unit of the apothecaries' system of weights—is much smaller at 2.5 imp fl oz (71 mL).

Most champagne houses are unable to carry out secondary fermentation in bottles larger than a magnum due to the difficulty in riddling large, heavy bottles. After the secondary fermentation completes, the champagne must be transferred from the magnums into larger bottles, which results in a loss of pressure. Some believe this re-bottling exposes the champagne to greater oxidation and therefore results in an inferior product compared to champagne which remains in the bottle in which it was fermented.

Volume (litres)	Ratio	Name	Notes	Champagne	Bordeaux	Burgundy
0.1875	0.25	Piccolo	"Small" in Italian. Also known as a "quarter bottle", "pony", "snipe" or "split". In Germany, the very popular "Piccolo" for sparkling wine is (predominantly) 0.2 litres, however (see below).	Yes		
0.2	0.2667	Quarter	Used for Champagne and sparkling wine	Yes		
0.25	0.33	Chopine	Traditional French unit of volume		Yes	
0.375	0.5	Demi	"Half" in French. Also known as a "half bottle". Common for ice wine	Yes "half"	Yes	Yes
0.378	0.505	Tenth	One tenth of a US gallon*			
0.5	0.67		Used for Tokaj, Sauternes, Jerez, as well as several other types of sweet wines, also common for cheaper wines in Switzerland	Yes "demie" or "pinte"		
0.620	0.83	Clavelin	Primarily used for vin jaune			
0.750	1	Standard		Yes	Yes	Yes
0.757	1.01	Fifth	One-fifth of a US gallon* (before 1979)			
1.0	1.33	Litre	Popular size for Austrian wines			
1.5	2	Magnum		Yes	Yes	Yes
2.25	3	Marie Jeanne	Also known as a "tregnum" or "tappit hen" in the port wine trade		Yes	
3.0	4	Double Magnum		Yes	Yes	Yes
3.0	4	Jeroboam	Biblical, first king of Northern Kingdom. "Jeroboam" indicates different sizes in different regions of France.	Yes	Yes	Yes
4.5	6	Jeroboam	Biblical, first king of Northern Kingdom. "Jeroboam" indicates different sizes in different regions of France.		Yes	
4.5	6	Rehoboam	Biblical, first king of separate Judea	Yes		Yes
5.0	6.67	McKenzie	Uncommon, primarily found in France		Yes	
6.0	8	Imperial			Yes	
6.0	8	Methuselah	Biblical, oldest man, grandfather of Noah	Yes		Yes
9.0	12	Salmanazar	Biblical, Assyrian king	Yes	Yes	Yes
12.0	16	Balthazar or Belshazzar	Balthazar—one of three Wise Men to present gifts at Jesus' nativity; Belshazzar can also denote the co-regent of Babylon during the absence of Nabonidus, who had seized control after several brief reigns following Nebuchadnezzar, for whom the next-larger bottle size is named.	Yes	Yes	Yes
15.0	20	Nebuchadnezzar	Biblical, King of Babylon	Yes	Yes	Yes
18.0	24	Melchior	One of three Wise Men to present gifts at Jesus' nativity	Yes	Yes	Yes
20.0	26	Solomon	Biblical, King of Israel, son of David	Yes		
26.25	35	Sovereign	Reportedly created by Taittinger in 1988 for the launch of the then-world's largest cruise liner Sovereign of the Seas	Yes		
27.0	36	Primat or Goliath	"Primat" likely from the Late Latin prīmās (chief, noble); Goliath—Biblical, killed by David	Yes	Yes	
30.0	40	Melchizedek or Midas	Melchizedek—Biblical, King of Salem; Midas may refer to the mythical king of Phrygia in Greek mythology	Yes		

* For many years, the US standard (non-metric) wine and liquor bottle was the "fifth", meaning one-fifth of a US gallon, or 25.6 US fluid ounces (757 mL; 26.6 imp fl oz). Some beverages also came in tenth-gallon [12.8 US fluid ounces (379 mL; 13.3 imp fl oz)], eighth-gallon [1 US pint, or 16 US fluid ounces (473 mL; 16.7 imp fl oz)], sixth-gallon [22 US fluid ounces (651 mL; 22.9 imp fl oz)], fourth-gallon [1 US quart, or 32 US fluid ounces (946 mL; 33.3 imp fl oz)], half-gallon [64 US fluid ounces (1,890 mL; 66.6 imp fl oz)] and one-gallon [128 US fluid ounces (3,790 mL; 133 imp fl oz)] sizes. In 1979, the US adopted the metric system for liquor bottles, with the basic wine bottle becoming 750 mL, as in Europe.

== Shapes ==
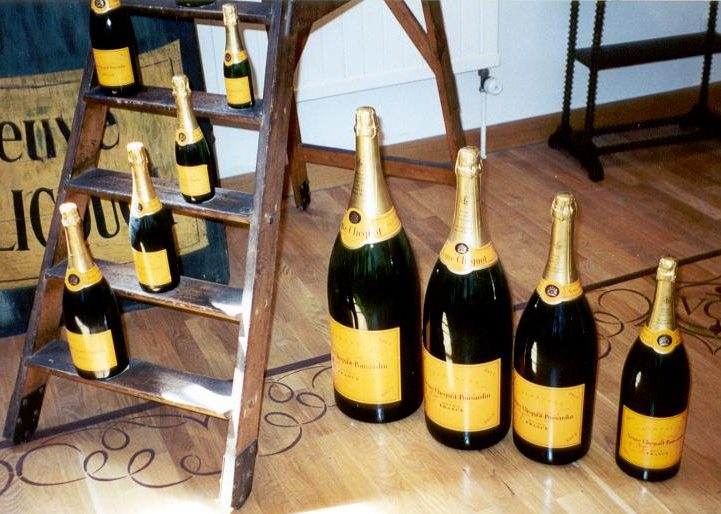
Side-by-side comparison of various sizes of champagne bottles (left to right), on the ladder: magnum, full, half, and quarter; on the floor: Balthazar, Salmanazar, Methuselah, and Jeroboam.

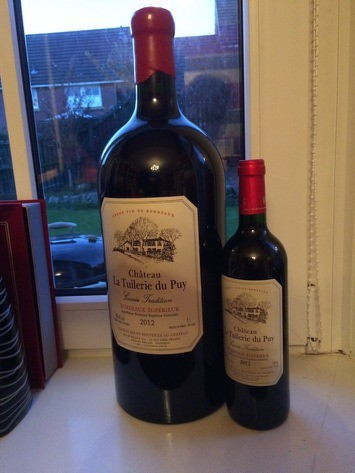
Comparison of Standard and McKenzie Bordeaux bottles

Wine producers in Portugal, Italy, Spain, France and Germany follow the tradition of their local areas in choosing the shape of bottle most appropriate for their wine.

- Port, sherry, and Bordeaux varieties: straight-sided and high-shouldered with a pronounced punt. Port and sherry bottles may have a bulbous neck to collect any residue.
- Burgundies and Rhône varieties: tall bottles with sloping shoulders and a smaller punt.
- Schlegel variety, predominantly used in German wine growing regions: similar to Burgundy bottles, but more slender and elongated.
- Rhine (also known as hock or hoch), Mosel, and Alsace varieties: narrow and tall with little or no punt.
- Champagne and other sparkling wines: Broadly similar to Burgundy bottles, with sloping shoulders, but wider, thick-walled, and with a more pronounced punt
- German wines from Franconia: the Bocksbeutel bottle.
- The Chianti and some other Italian wines: the fiasco, a round-bottomed flask encased in a straw basket. This is more often used for everyday table wines; many of the higher-grade Chianti producers have switched to Bordeaux-type bottles.

Many North and South American, South African, and Australasian wine producers select the bottle shape with which they wish to associate their wines. For instance, a producer who believes his wine is similar to Burgundy may choose to bottle his wine in Burgundy-style bottles.

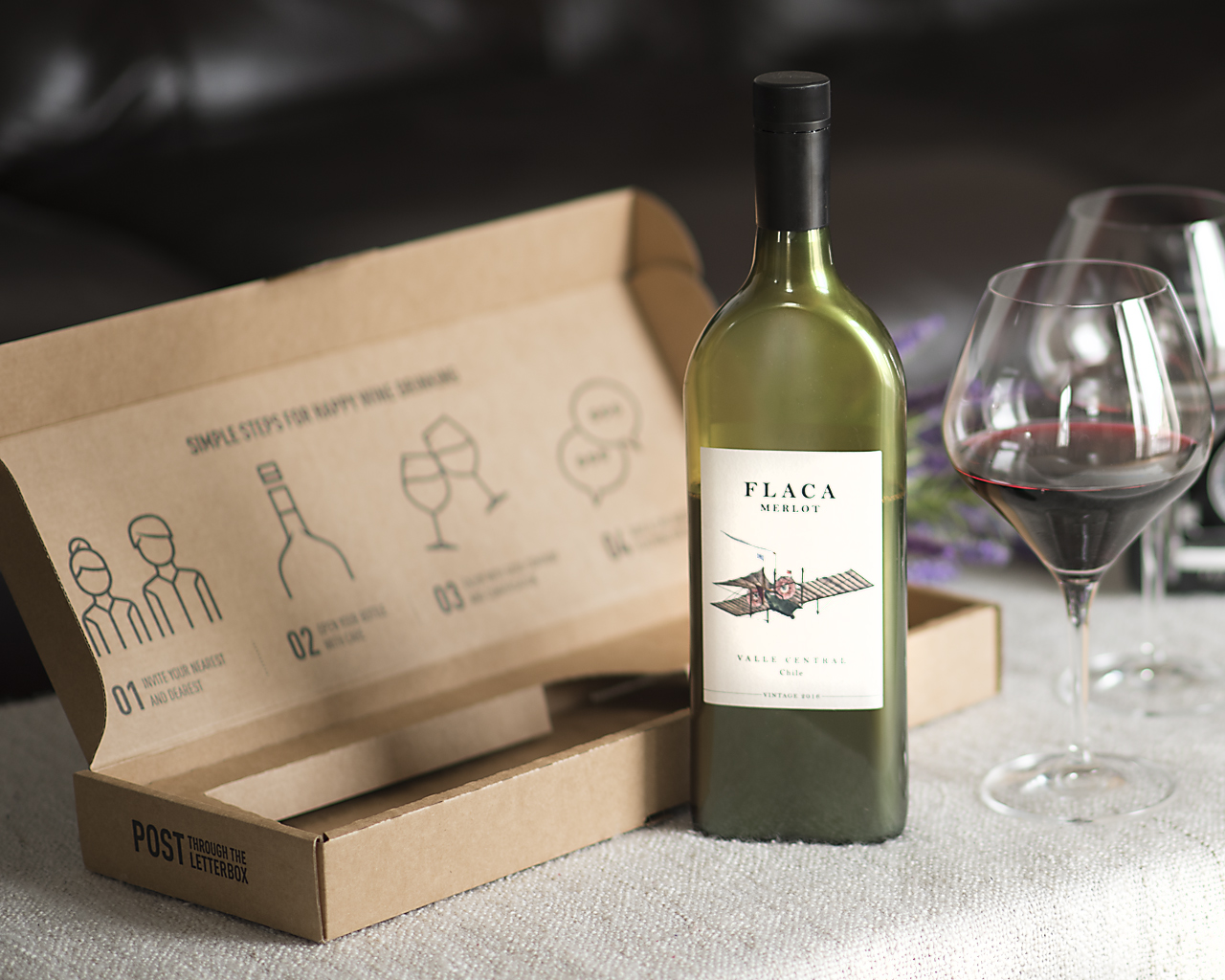
A flat PET bottle and a cardboard carton in which it can be delivered postally

Other producers (both in and out of Europe) have chosen idiosyncratic bottle styles for marketing purposes. Pere-Anselme markets its Châteauneuf-du-Pape in bottles that appear half-melted. The Moselland company of Bernkastel-Kues in Germany has a Riesling with a bottle in the shape of a stylized cat. The British company Garçon Wines makes a flat wine bottle from recycled PET which is flat enough to fit through a letterbox and hence can be delivered by post.

The home wine maker may use any bottle, as the shape of the bottle does not affect the taste of the finished product. The sole exception is in producing sparkling wine, where thicker-walled bottles should be used to handle the excess pressure.

Most wine bottles standards have a bore (inner neck) diameter of 18.5 mm at the mouth of the bottle and increase to 21 mm before expanding into the full bottle.

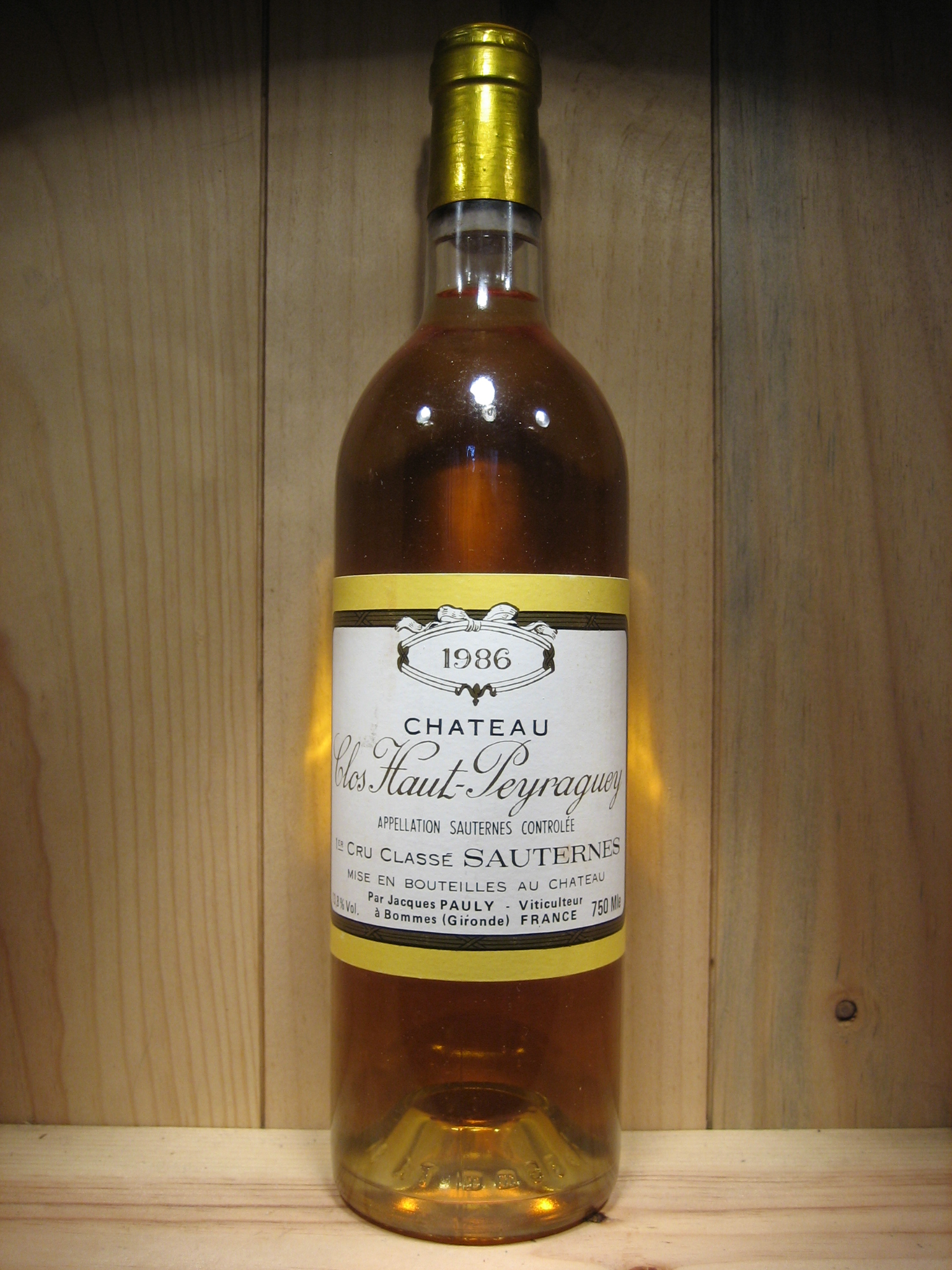
A bottle from Bordeaux: (a bordelaise)

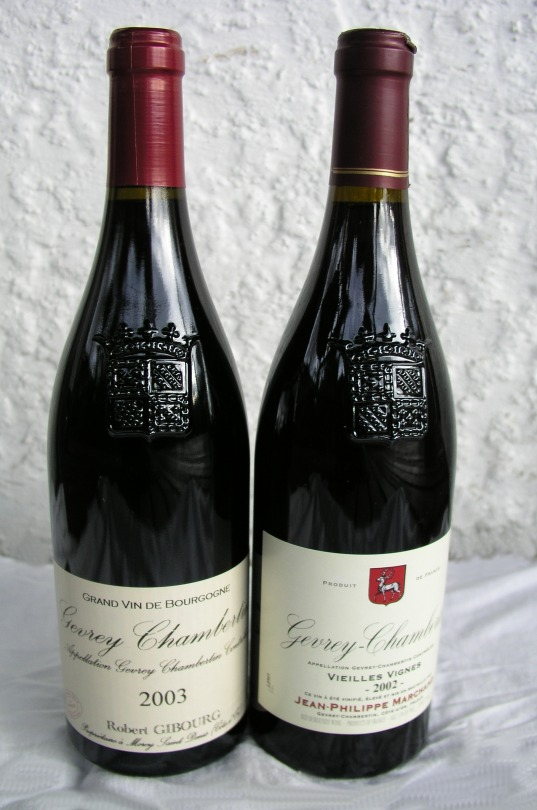
A bottle from Burgundy: (a bourguignonne)

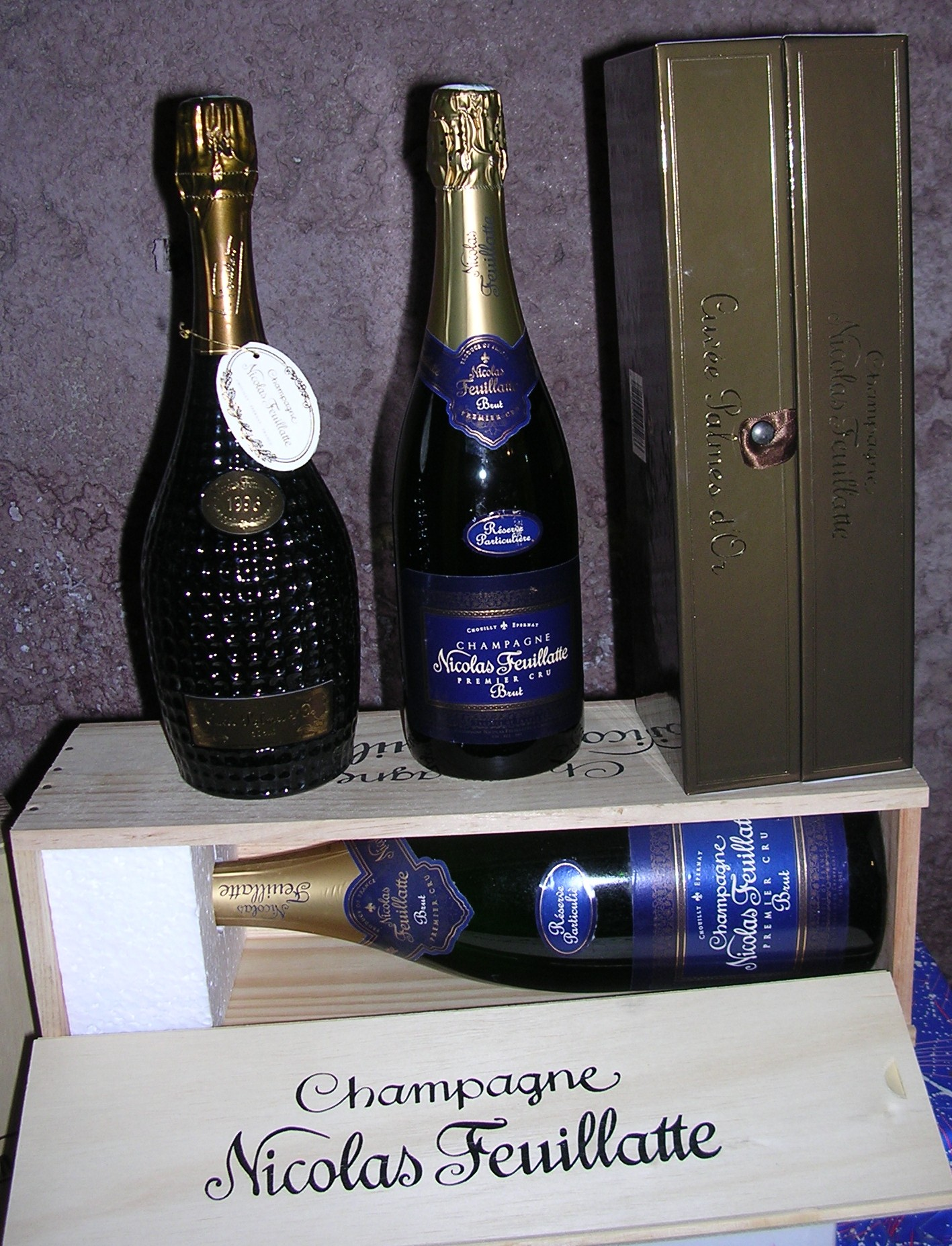
Bottles from Champagne: (champagnes)

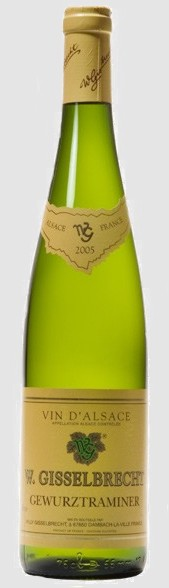
A bottle from Alsace: (a flute)

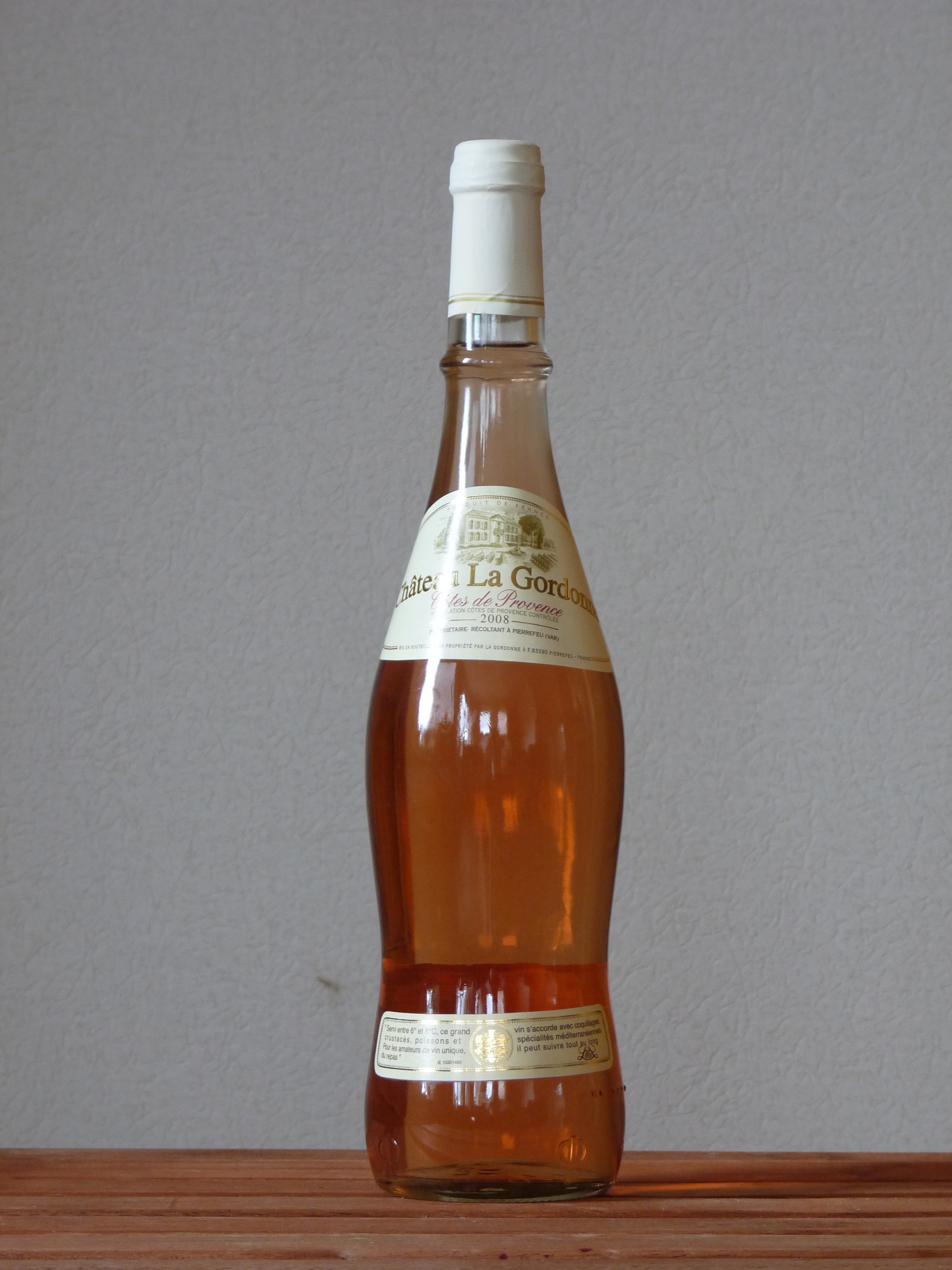
A bottle from Provence: (a flute with corset, or flute provençale, or flute quille)

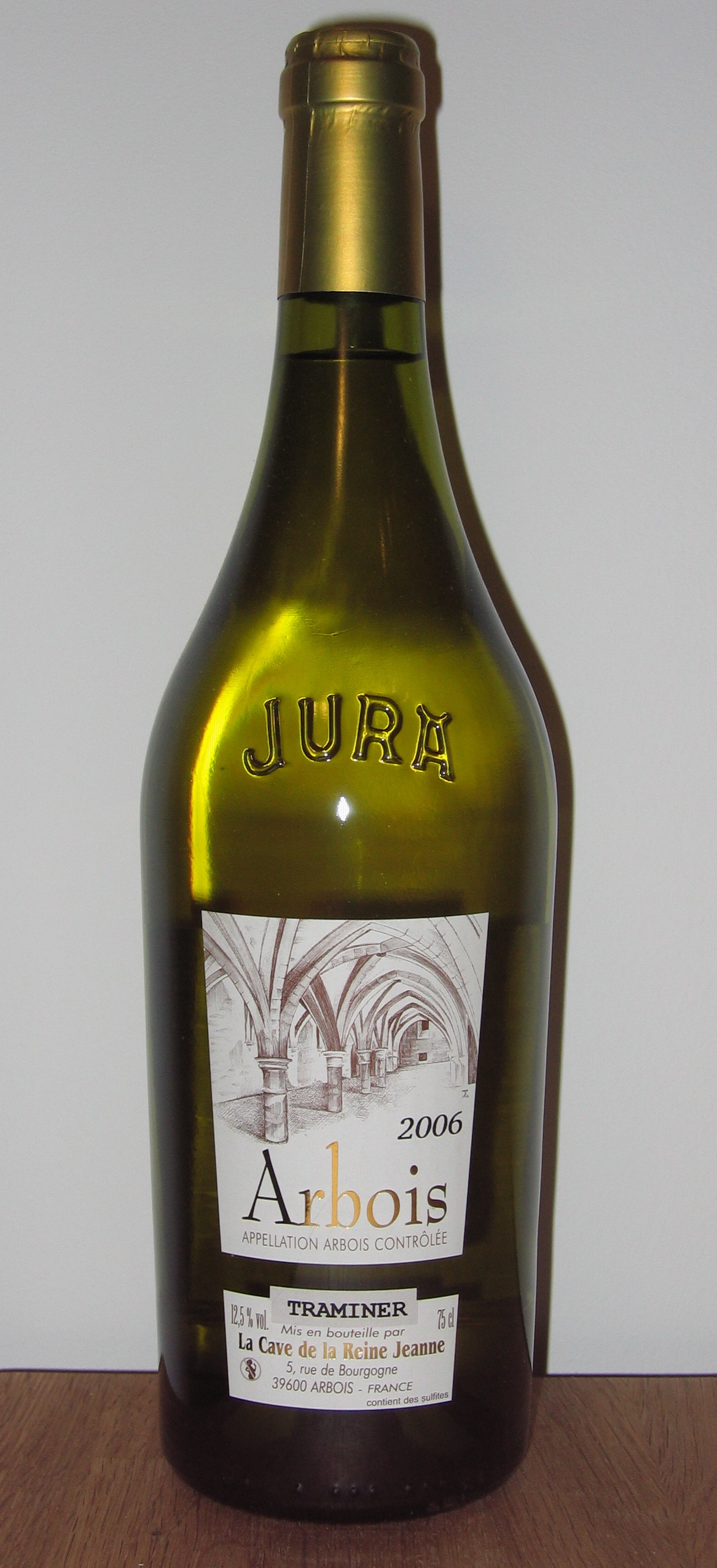
A bottle from Jura
(a jurassienne)

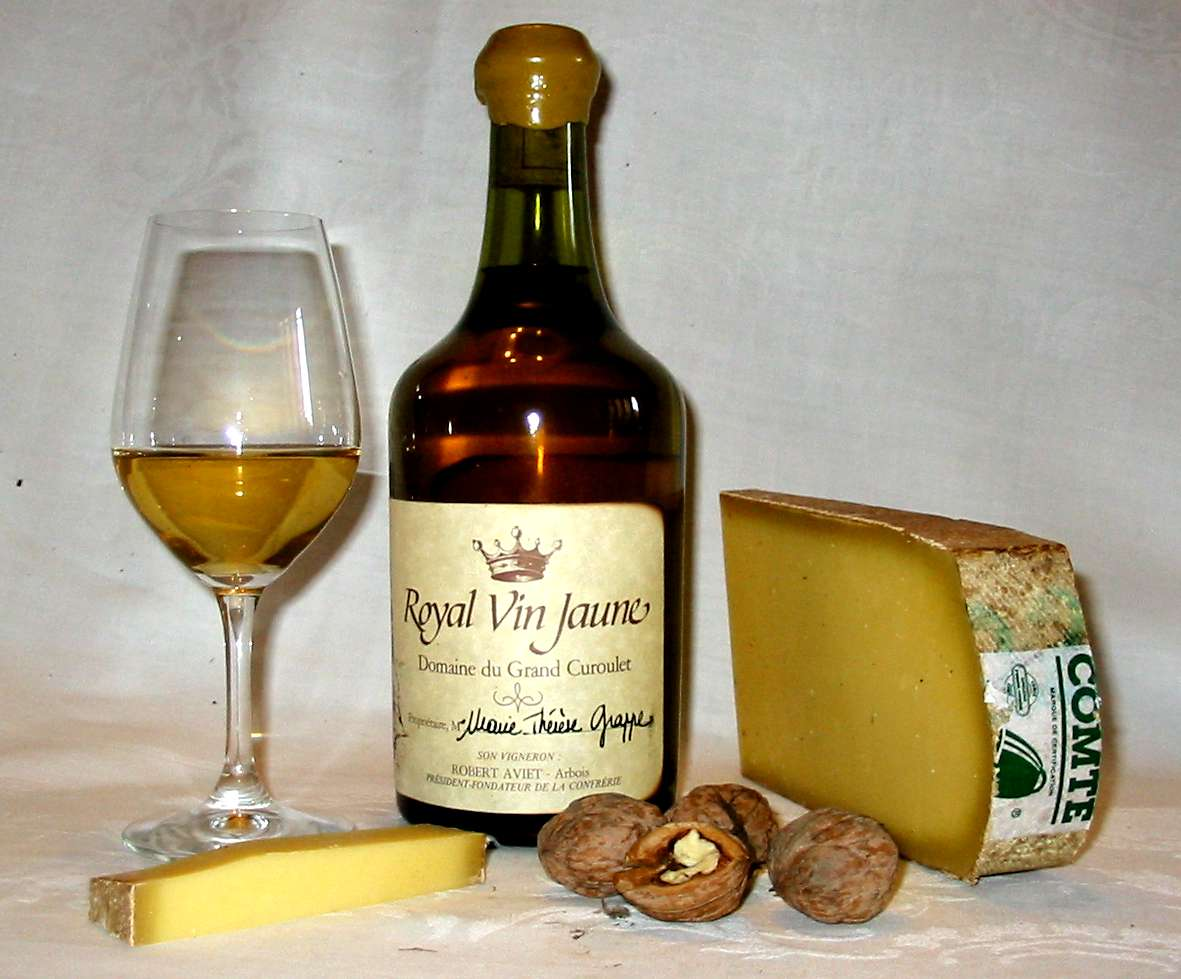
A bottle of yellow wine from Jura: (a clavelin)

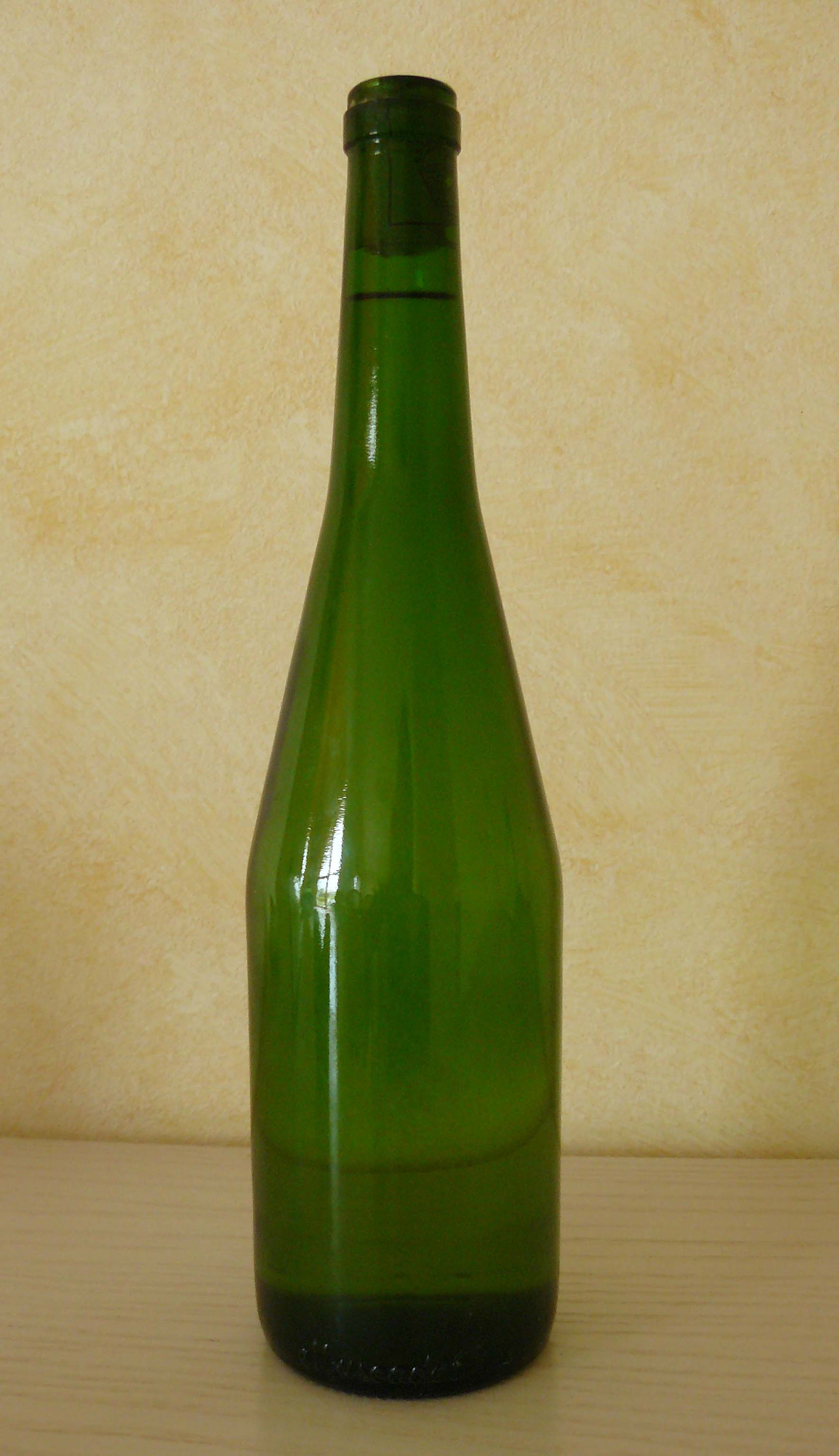
A bottle from Muscadet: (a muscadet)

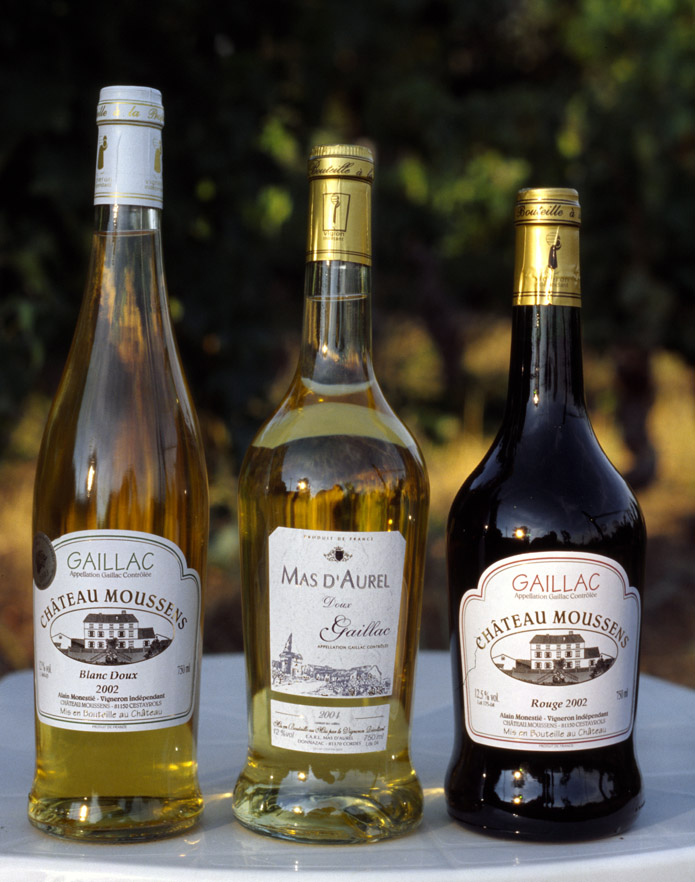
Bottles from Gaillac: (some gaillacoises)

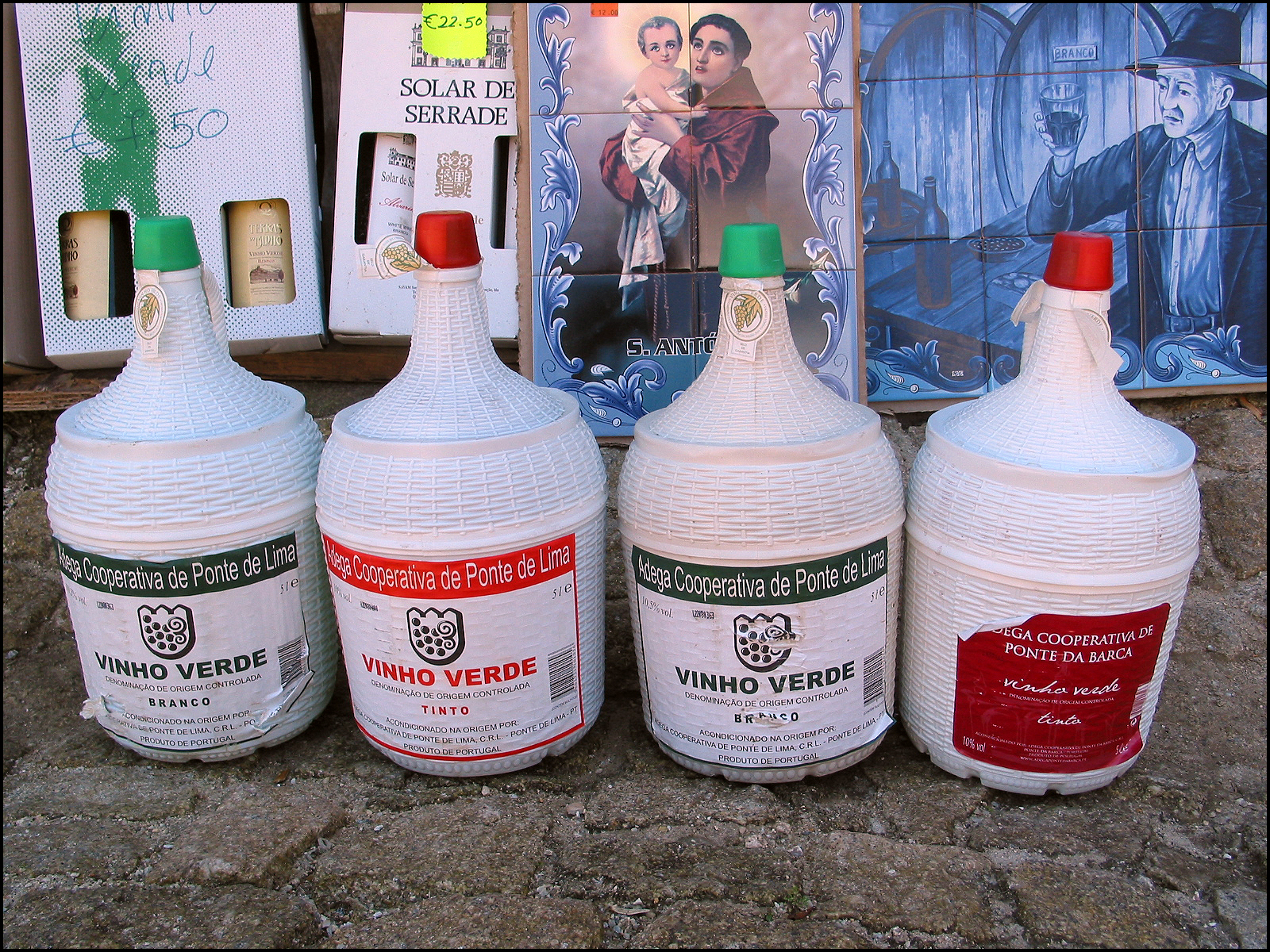
Bottles of Vinho Verde in plastic (of garrafões)

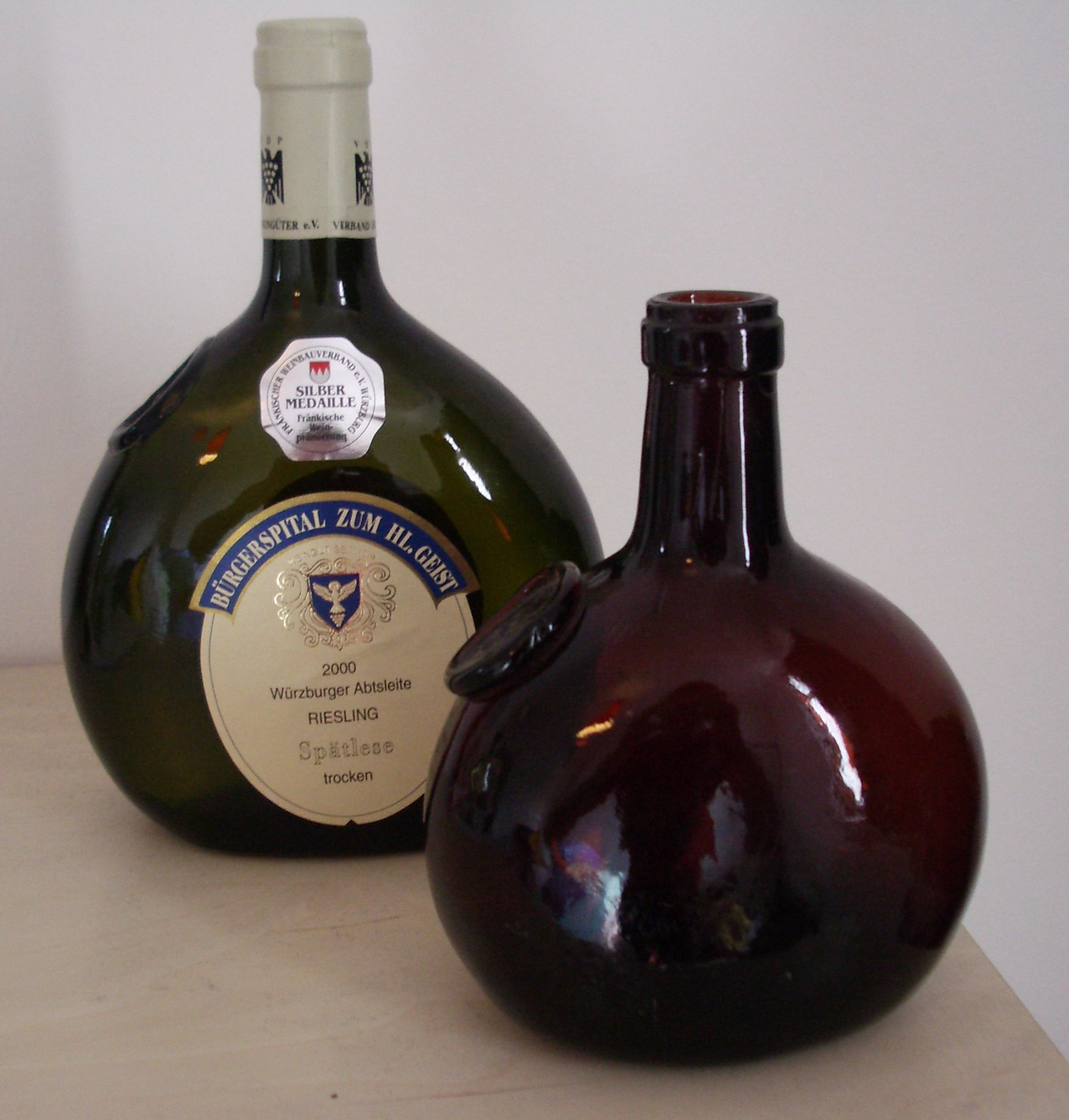
Bottles from Franconia: (a bocksbeutel)

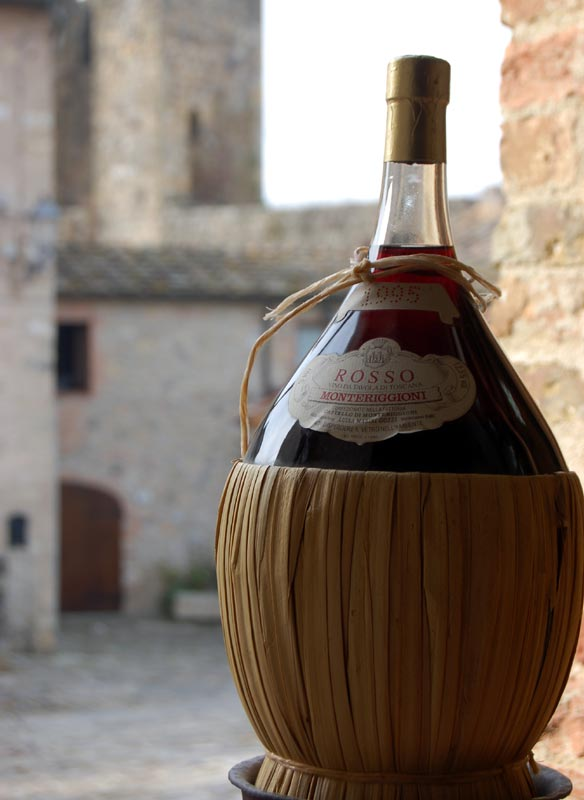
A bottle from Chianti (a fiasco)

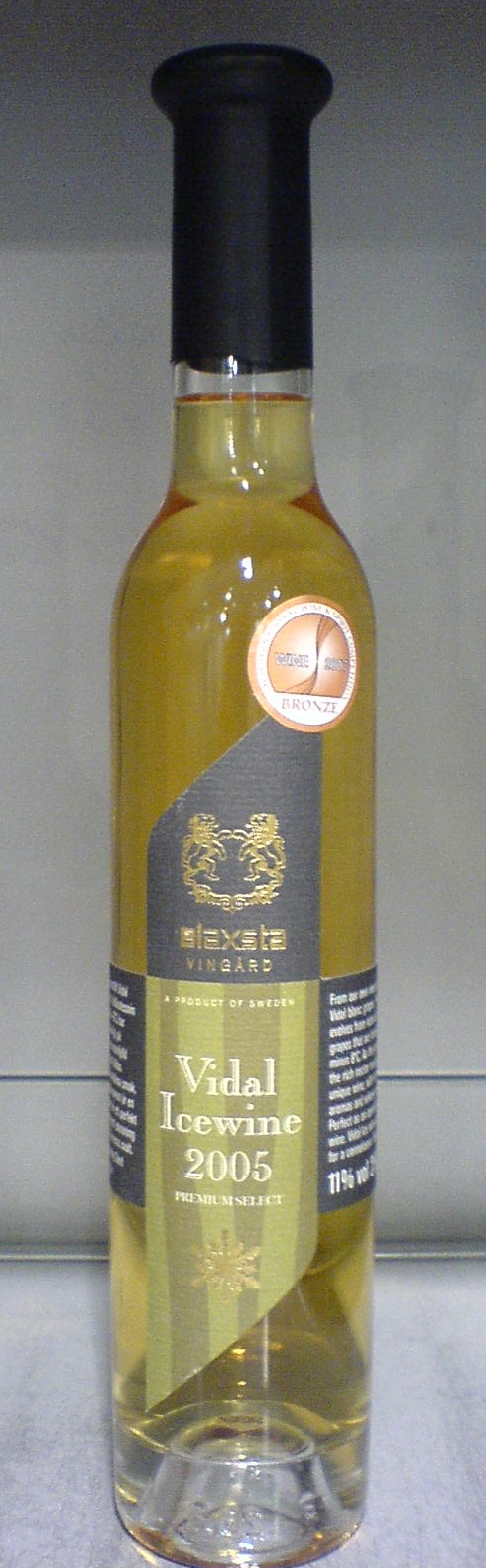
A bottle of ice wine

== Foils and netting ==
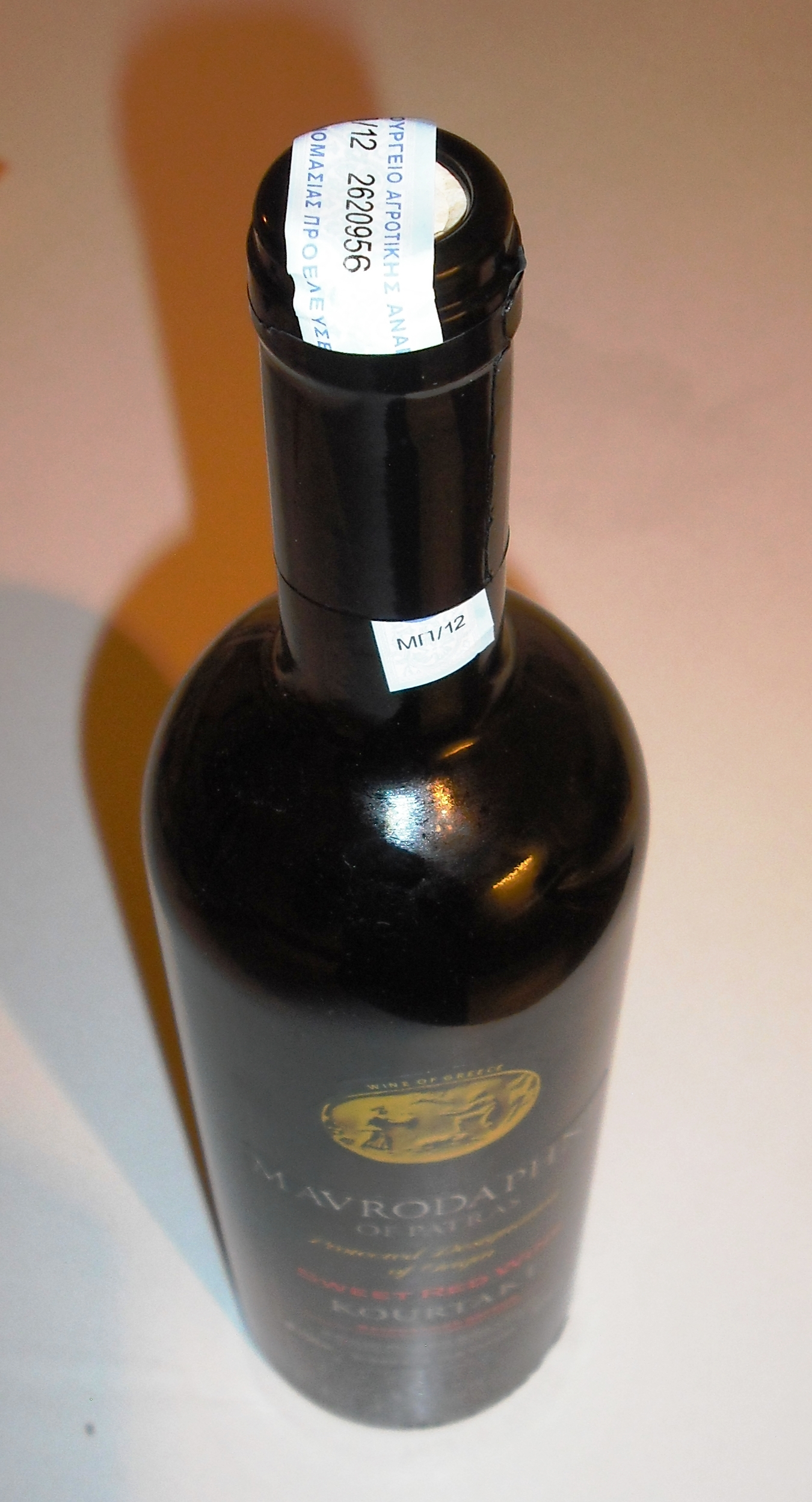
A paper strip beneath the foil

Commercial corked wine bottles typically have a protective sleeve called a foil (commonly referred to as a "capsule") covering the top of the bottle, the purpose of which is to protect the cork from being gnawed away by rodents or infested with the cork weevil and to serve as collar to catch small drips when pouring. The foil also serves as a decorative element of the bottle's label. Foils were historically made of lead, but research showed that trace amounts of toxic lead could remain on the lip of the bottle and mix with the poured wine, so lead foil wrapping was slowly phased out, and by the 1990s, most foils were made of tin, heat-shrink plastic (polyethylene, PVC), aluminium or polylaminate aluminium.

Sealing wax is sometimes used, or the foil can be omitted entirely. In the US, the FDA officially banned lead foils on domestic and imported wine bottles as of 1996.

Some bottles of wine have a paper strip beneath the foil, as a seal of authenticity, which must be broken before the bottle can be uncorked. Bottles of high-end Rioja wine may have a covering of gold wire netting, Spaniard Camilo Hurtado de Amézaga, Marqués de Riscal founded a winery in Rioja, in 1858, naming it after his own noble title, which had been created in 1708 by Philip V. He produced award-winning wines which became the preferred wines of King Alfonso XII. Camilo Hurtado de Amézaga invented a wire netting that covered his bottle, thereby preventing counterfeiters from substituting the wine, since it was impossible to remove the netting without breaking it. Modern day bottles of Rioja carry a much finer wire netting as a decoration.

== Punts ==
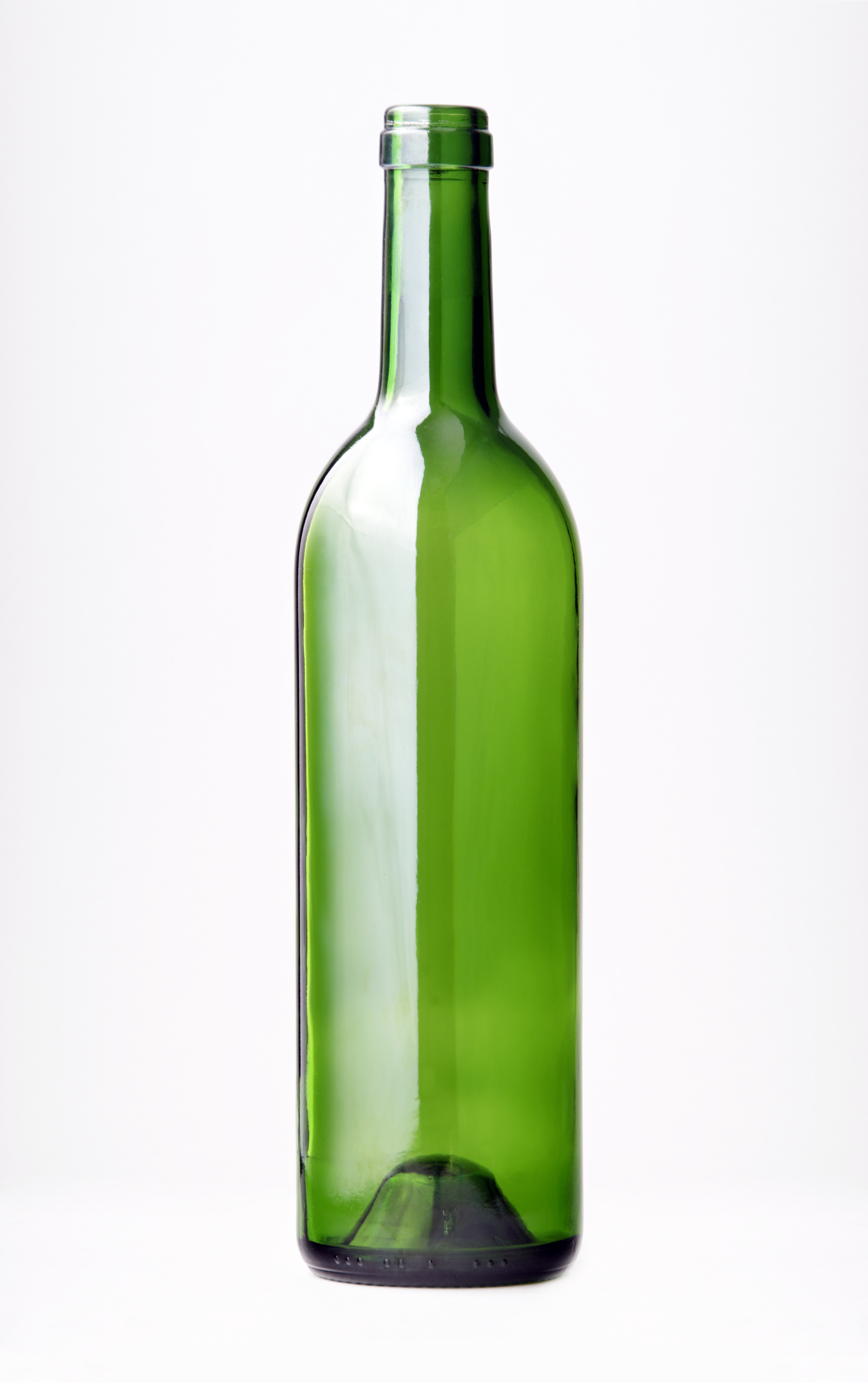
An empty (Bordeaux-style) wine bottle with a punt at its base.

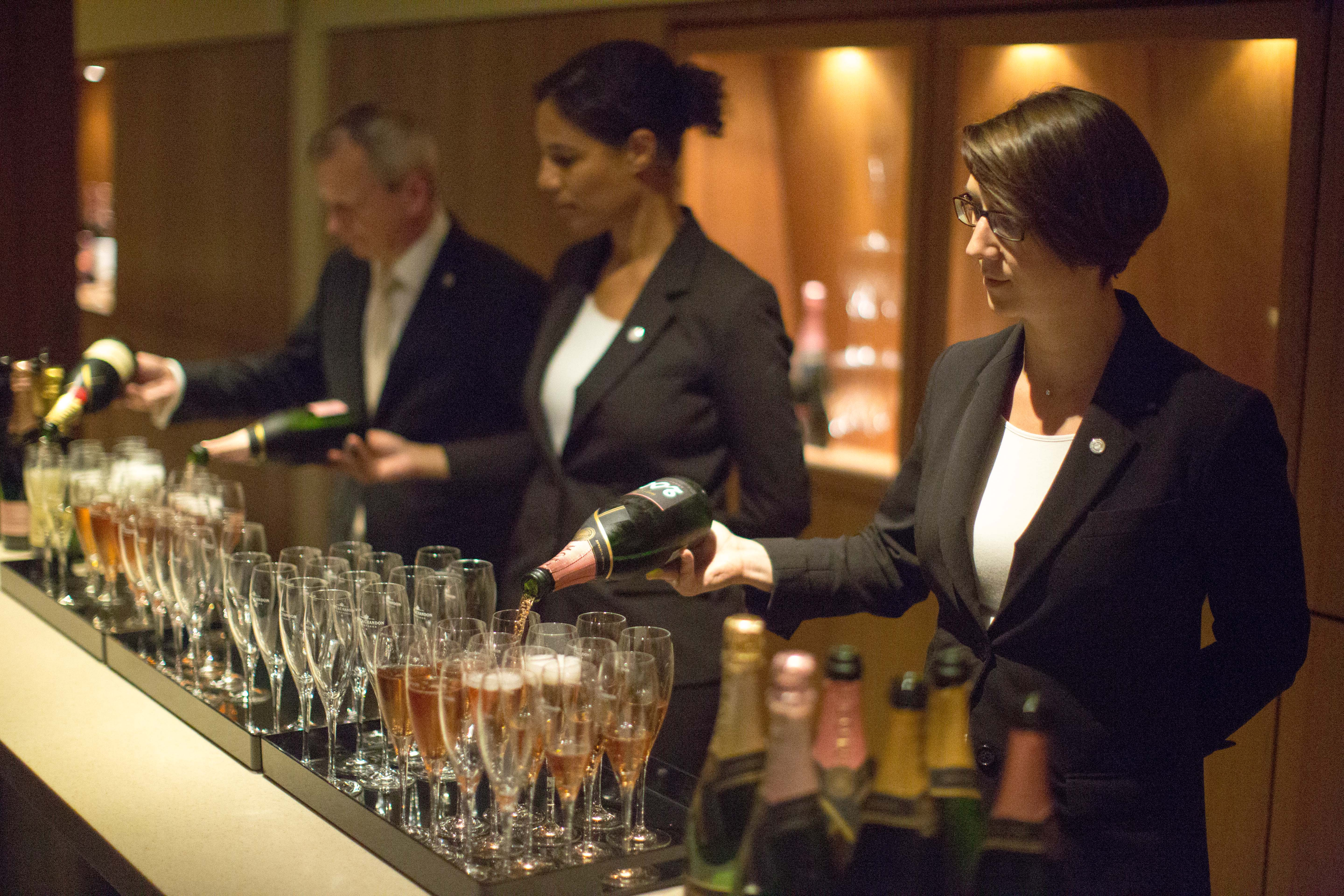
Servers pouring Moët & Chandon champagne using the punt as a means to singlehandedly grip the bottles.

A punt, also known as a kick-up, is the dimple at the bottom of a wine bottle. There is no consensus explanation for its purpose. The more commonly cited explanations include:

- It is a historical remnant from the era when wine bottles were free blown using a blowpipe and pontil. This technique leaves a punt mark on the base of the bottle; by indenting the point where the pontil is attached, this scar would not scratch the table or make the bottle unstable.
- It had the function of making the bottle less likely to topple over—a bottle designed with a flat bottom only needs a small imperfection to make it unstable—the dimple historically allowed for a larger margin of error.
- It consolidates sediment deposits in a thick ring at the bottom of the bottle, preventing much/most of it from being poured into the glass; this may be a more historical than functional attribute since most modern wines contain little or no sediment.
- It increases the strength of the bottle, allowing it to hold the high pressure of sparkling wine/champagne.
- It provides a grip for riddling a bottle of sparkling wine manually in the traditional champagne production process.
- It consumes some volume of the bottle, allowing the bottle to appear larger for the same amount of wine, which may impress the purchaser.
- In folklore, taverns had a steel pin set vertically in the bar. The empty bottle would be thrust bottom-end down onto this pin, puncturing a hole in the top of the punt, guaranteeing the bottle could not be refilled.
- It prevents the bottle from resonating as easily, decreasing the likelihood of shattering during transportation.
- It allows bottles to be more easily stacked end to end.
- Bottles could be stacked in cargo holds on ships without rolling around and breaking.
- It makes the bottle easier to clean prior to filling with wine. When a stream of water is injected into the bottle and impacts the punt, it is distributed throughout the bottom of the bottle and removes residues.

== Environmental impact ==
Glass retains its color on recycling, and the United Kingdom has a large surplus of green glass because it imports a large quantity of wine but produces very little. Annually 1.4 million tons are sent to landfill.

Glass is a relatively heavy packing material and wine bottles use quite thick glass, so the tare weight of a full wine bottle is a relatively high proportion of its gross weight. The average weight of an empty 750 mL wine bottle is 500 g (and can range from 300 to 900 g), which makes the glass 40% of the total weight of the full bottle. This has led to suggestions that wine should be exported in bulk from producer regions and bottled close to the market. This would reduce the cost of transportation and its carbon footprint, and provide a local market for recycled green glass.

Less radically, boxed wine is sold in large, light-weight, foil-lined cardboard containers, though its use has been restricted to cheaper products in the past and as such retains a stigma. Following declining sales of wine boxes in the UK, in 2009 the Office for National Statistics removed them from its Consumer Price Index measure of inflation. Some wine producers are exploring more alternative packaging types such as plastic bottles and paperboard cartons.

== See also ==
- Beer bottle – Bottle designed as a container for beer
- Glass bottle – Narrow-necked container
- Kenelm Digby – English courtier and diplomat, considered the father of the modern wine bottle

== General and cited references ==
- Jean-Robert Pitte, La bouteille de vin: Histoire d'une révolution, 2013, ISBN 9791021001138
