= Bocksbeutel =

Type of wine bottle

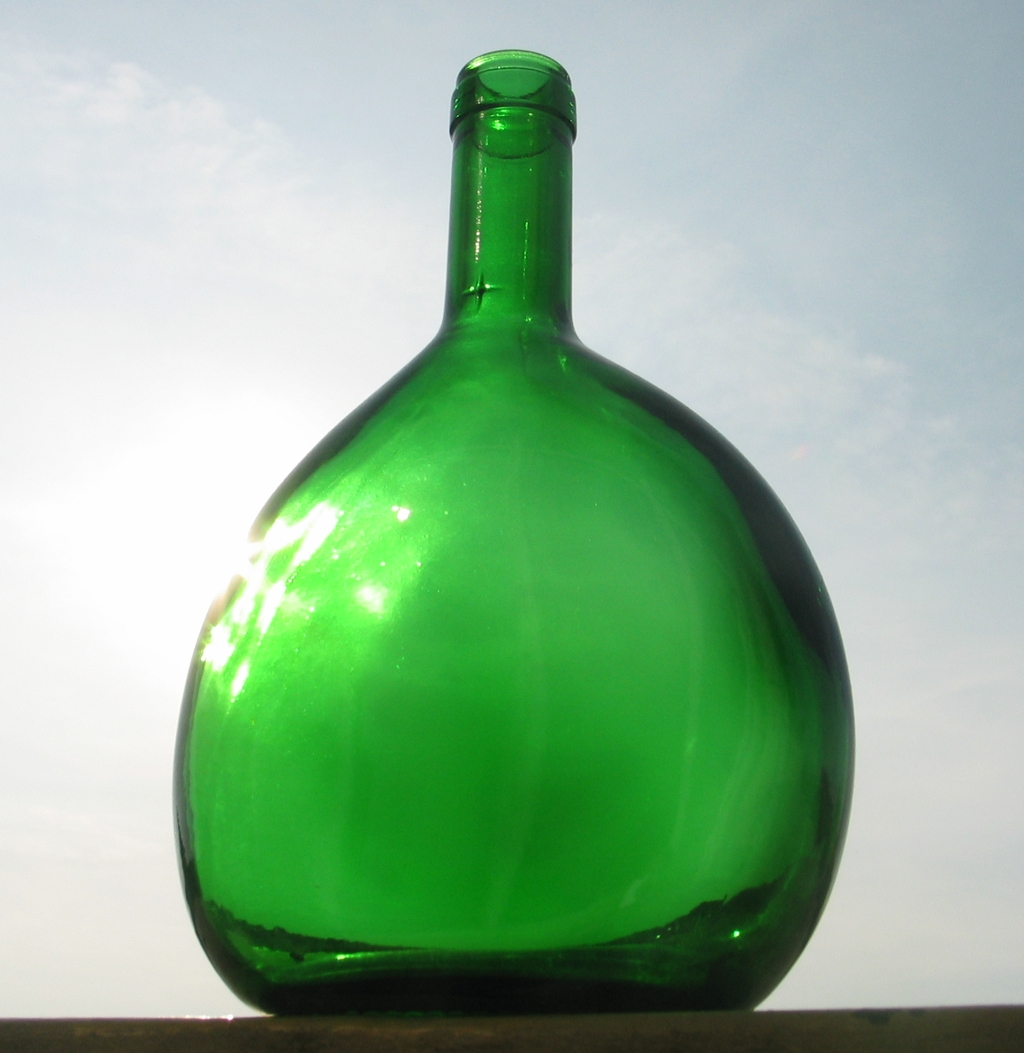
Bocksbeutel

The Bocksbeutel (German: [ˈbɔksˌbɔɪ̯tl̩]) is a type of wine bottle with the form of a flattened ellipsoid. It is commonly used for wines from Franconia in Germany, but is also used for some Portuguese wines, in particular rosés, where the bottle is called cantil, and in rare cases for Italian wine (in this case called pulcianella) and Greek wine.

== History ==
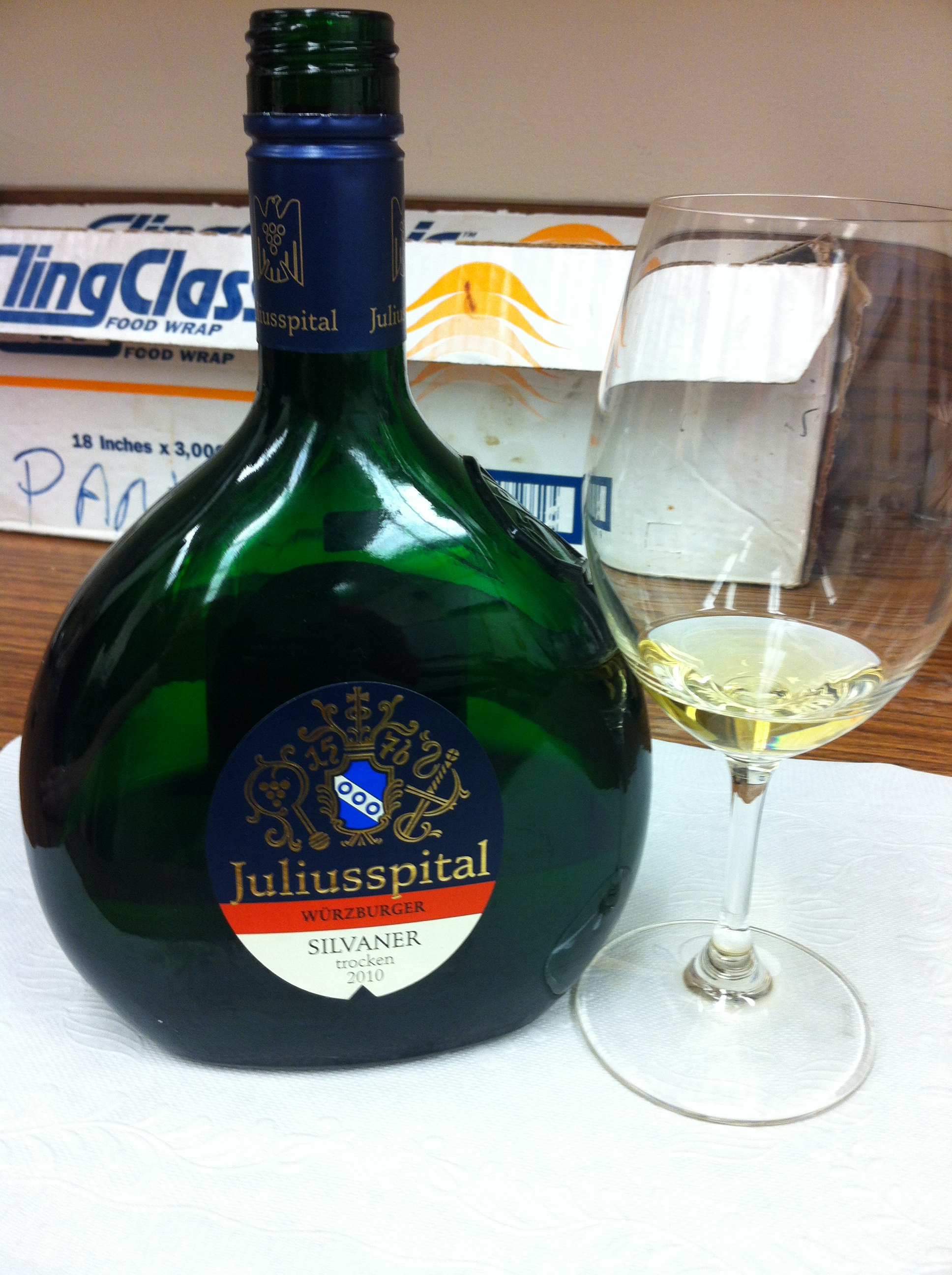
A Silvaner from Franconia packaged in the traditional Bocksbeutel

This bottle shape is derived from that of field bottles, which were known already in antiquity, and which were manufactured with a flattened shape for practical purposes, for example to keep the bottle from rolling away on uneven ground.

The Bocksbeutel has been used for wine from Franconia at least since the early 18th century, initially for the wines from the region's most famous vineyard, the Würzburger Stein, and later for other Franconian wines, in particular those of better quality. The city council of Würzburg decided in 1728 that the best wines from the city's own winery, the Bürgerspital, should be filled in Bocksbeutel bottles.

== Origin of the name ==
There are two conflicting claims of the origin of the name Bocksbeutel, although the Beutel-part stands for "container" in both cases.

One claim is that it is derived from the Low German term Booksbüdel, which stands for a small sack used to protect and carry books, in particular prayer books or song books carried on travels (see girdle books). These sacks were used already in pre-Reformation times, but became eventually outdated and were seen as a whimsical expression of overly conservative behavior.

Another claim is that the term actually means "ram's scrotum", which is supposed to be of similar shape as the bottle. This explanation is given as early as 1690 in a dictionary by Kaspar von Stieler. The term Bokesbudel with this meaning is said to have existed in the Early Middle Age, before song books were used.

However, the explanations are not mutually exclusive. Franconia is well distant from the Low German-speaking lands, and a term like Booksbüdel would not normally have been understood there. If the Low German term was adopted in Franconia, any similar local words are likely to have influenced this process.

There is a later expression einen Bocksbeutel anhängen ("to attach a Bocksbeutel [to someone]"), meaning "to make someone an object of ridicule", attested in the 19th-century Deutsches Wörterbuch. A physical Bocksbeutel was indeed used as a practical joke (cf. the "Kick me" prank, cuckold horns and other forms of public humiliation such as "donkey ears"), but a wine bottle is an unlikely object to use for such a purpose. Both a Booksbüdel and a ram's scrotum are perfectly suitable, being small and light objects with a connotation of ridiculousness. Thus, it is hard to determine to what extent either Booksbüdel or Bokesbudel or both contributed to the modern term.

== Protected bottle shape ==
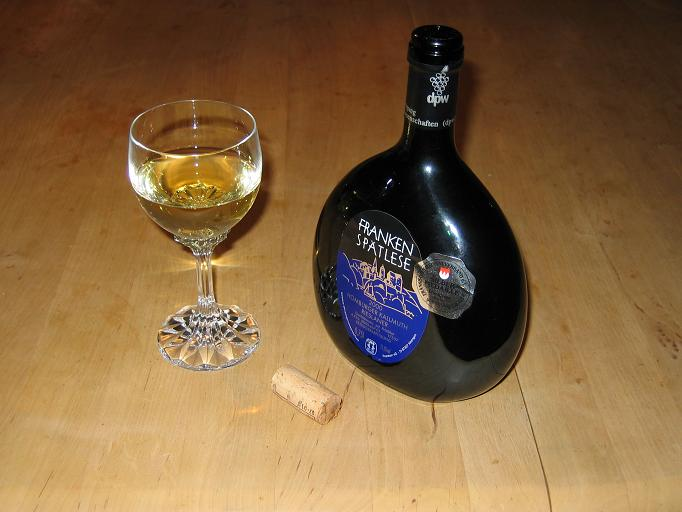
A wine from Franconia in a Bocksbeutel

Within the European Union, the Bocksbeutel enjoys the status of a protected bottle shape. The regulations describe the Bocksbeutel as a short-necked glass bottle, pot-bellied but flattened in shape, with the base and the cross-section of the bottle at the point of greatest convexity ellipsoidal in shape. The ratio between the long and short axes of the ellipsoidal cross-section is approximately 2:1, and the ratio of the height of the convex body to the cylindrical neck of the bottle is approximately 2.5:1.

The Bocksbeutel may be used for the following wines:

- German wines of QbA and Prädikatswein quality from:
  - Franconia
  - Certain parts of Baden, in the district known as Tauber Franconia (Tauberfranken) and around Baden-Baden
- Certain wines from Northern and Central Italy at the DOC and DOCG level:
  - Santa Maddalena (St. Magdalener),
  - Valle Isarco (Eisacktaler), if made from Silvaner or Müller-Thurgau
  - Terlaner, if made from Pinot blanc
  - Bozner Leiten
  - Alto Adige (Südtiroler), if made from Riesling, Müller-Thurgau, Pinot noir, Moscato giallo, Silvaner, Lagrein, Pinot blanc or Moscato rosa
  - Greco di Bianco
  - Trentino, if made from Moscato
  - (in ancient times) Montepulciano
- Certain Greek wines
  - Agioritiko
  - Rombola Kephalonias
  - Wines from the island of Kefalonia
  - Wines from the island of Paros
  - Wines from the Peloponnese
- Certain Portuguese wines, such as Mateus. The use is limited to rosé wines and those other quality wines and vinho regional which can prove that they have traditionally been bottled in cantil-type bottles before they received their present classification.

== See also ==
- Garçon Wines, a British manufacturer of flat wine bottles used to make transportation easier
