= Cork Boat =

Cork Boat may refer to:

- Cork Boat (vessel), a boat made almost entirely of wine corks
- Cork Boat (book), a first-person account of the creation of the Cork Boat
