= Punderdome =

Pun-based comedy event in Brooklyn

- Genre: Comedy
- Locations: Brooklyn, New York, United States
- Years active: May 2011–present
- Founders: Fred Firestone and Jo Firestone
- Attendance: 400
- Website: punderdome.com

Punderdome (formerly known as Punderdome 3000) is an American pun-based comedy competition held approximately every six weeks in Brooklyn, New York. The event was created in May 2011 by comedian Jo Firestone and her father, Fred Firestone.

In a typical round, a category such as "automobiles" is revealed, and contestants have 90 seconds to generate as many puns, such as "He drove his expensive car into a tree and found out how the Mercedes Benz!", as possible.

== Competition structure ==
Punderdome involves both "Pun Battle Royale", in which contestants give rapid-fire jokes on a given topic, and a tournament of champions in which contestants are given two minutes to prepare a two-minute standup set with as many puns as possible. Contestants are judged by a "human clap-o-meter", with a judge assigning each contestant a number from one to ten based on the volume and enthusiasm of audience applause.

Some contestants use pun names such as "Do Pun to Others", "Punky Brewster", "Punter S Thompson", "Forest Wittyker", "Glutton for Punishment", "Puntouchable", "Noah Constrictor", "When Wit Hits the Fan" "Punamerican Activities", and "Hot Cross Puns".

== History ==
Comedian Jo Firestone and her father Fred Firestone created and co-hosted the first Punderdome in May, 2011, inspired by the O. Henry Pun-Off World Championships in Austin, Texas. Fred Firestone, a Rodney Dangerfield impersonator, would fly in from St. Louis for the event.

In 2022, comedian Ben Eisen competed in the Punderdome after preparing AI generated puns with ChatGPT.

== Reception ==
In 2011, a New Yorker dispatch from the Punderdome described the event as "concentrated, unabashed silliness" and praised punning for its surprising difficulty and "elaborate set-ups". The New York Times covered the event in 2013, and GQ named it one of the "funniest nights in America" in 2015. In a 2017 article in The Guardian, Joe Berkowitz wrote that the "audience seemed just as happy groaning as laughing". In 2023, the Columbia University Graduate School of Journalism published an article describing the event as the "whole competition was lighthearted and goofy".

The Punderdome has inspired two television pilots and a card game of the same name.
