= Cork thermal insulation =

Use of cork to reduce heat transfer

Cork thermal insulation refers to the use of cork as a material to provide thermal insulation against heat transfer. Cork is suitable as thermal insulator, as it is characterized by lightness, elasticity, impermeability, and fire resistance. In construction, cork can be applied to various elements such as floors, walls, roofs, and lofts to reduce the need for heating or cooling and to enhance energy efficiency. Studies indicate that cork's thermal insulation performance is unaffected by moisture absorption during rainy seasons, making it suitable for diverse climates. Additionally, research on cork-based composites, such as cork-gypsum structures, suggests substantial improvements in energy efficiency for buildings.

== Cork ==
Cork is a lightweight, reusable, and biodegradable material that is harvested every 9–12 years from the bark of the cork oak (Quercus Suber L.). It has a homogeneous cell structure with thin, regularly arranged cell walls without intercellular spaces. North Africa, as well as parts of Portugal, Spain, and Italy, are home to the cork oak. Cork production in the world is expected to be 201,428 tonnes per year, with approximately 2139942 ha of cork forests.

== Details of cork thermal insulation ==
Due to its combination of characteristics of lightness, elasticity, impermeability, insulation, wear resistance, fire retardant qualities, hypoallergenic properties, and mould resistance, cork is a material suitable for a variety of construction needs. It has a wide range of uses in construction industry, including floor and wall coverings, loft insulation, floor insulation, and roof insulation. Cork used for thermal insulation is usually made from cork oak or recycled cork. It is then either used in bulk or agglomerated in panels, usually as expanded cork. Research on cork is active. It includes various aspects of the material's characterisation, distribution, and application. Several research studies have evaluated the effects of using cork oak materials as thermal insulation in buildings. The thermal conductivity of these materials ranges from 0.036 to 0.065 W m^{−1} K^{−1}, the density varies from 65 to 240 kg/m^{3}, while the specific heat ranges from 350 to 3370.

With a water vapour diffusion resistance factor of 5–54.61, cork materials have good hydric properties for moisture insulation. Fino et al. investigated the thermal insulation of walls covered with medium density expanded cork panes. To determine the impact of moisture on heat transfer through the cork wall, they conducted a comparative simulation of the insulation's behaviour in winter and summer conditions on the one side, and in dry and wet conditions on the other. The findings clearly demonstrated that moisture absorption during the rainy season is confined to the surface layers and has no effect on the cork's thermal insulation performance. Other research has focused on cork-based composites. The insulation used in the studies by Cherki et al. and Monir et al., is a cork-gypsum composite structure. Its usage would help to improve energy efficiency of buildings. According to this analysis, integrating cork crushes into the gypsum structure decreases the effective thermal conductivity of the latter by more than 70%. Indeed, gypsum has a thermal conductivity of about 0.406 W m^{−1} K^{−1} while the average thermal conductivity of the composite is about 0.11 W m^{−1} K^{−1}.

== Cork cement ==
Boussetoua et al. developed a new insulating material using cork aggregates and cement. Natural cork aggregates, sand, cement, and water are mixed together to prepare the samples. Different cork-to-sand ratios were considered. The findings indicate that increasing the amount of cork aggregate increases moisture retention, with water buffer values ranging from 0.39 to 1.2 g/(m^{2}.%HR) and water vapour permeability ranging from 2.7 × 10^{−12} to 21.4 × 10^{−12} kg/(m s Pa) as density decreases. Cork concrete can be used as a thermal insulator, according to these reports.

== Efficiency of cork thermal insulation ==
The thermal efficiency and hygrothermal behaviour of timber frame walls with various external insulation layers were studied by Fu et al. They observed that expanded cork panels provide better hygrothermal performance and building comfort than an anti-corrosion pine board. Barreca et al. used cork residues and giant reed for panels in buildings in the Mediterranean region. The energy saved by using agglomerated cork walls for the envelope is more than 75% of the energy spent for the construction with brick walls. Not only is there a financial advantage, but there is also an environmental benefit. Indeed, the estimated annual production of carbon dioxide for heating and cooling of the various houses studied was estimated to be 2517 kg for brick walls, 623 kg for agglomerated cork walls, and 1905 kg for giant reed walls. In addition, Maalouf et al. carried out a one-year hygrothermal simulation of a room for the weather conditions of Constantine in Algeria. According to preliminary findings, cork concrete can reduce energy consumption by about 29% as compared to hollow brick construction. The consideration of Moisture transfer increases energy consumption marginally in the winter due to desorption phenomenon and decreases cooling energy in the summer. El Wardi et al. investigated a new sandwich material using a clay-cork composite as a base material with a protective layer of plaster and cement mortar. Simulations on a small model house in the village of Bensmim in Morocco showed better energy and environmental performance with sandwich panel walls than with conventional hollow earth bricks or Bensmim clay bricks.
