= Brush Square Park =

Urban park in Austin, Texas

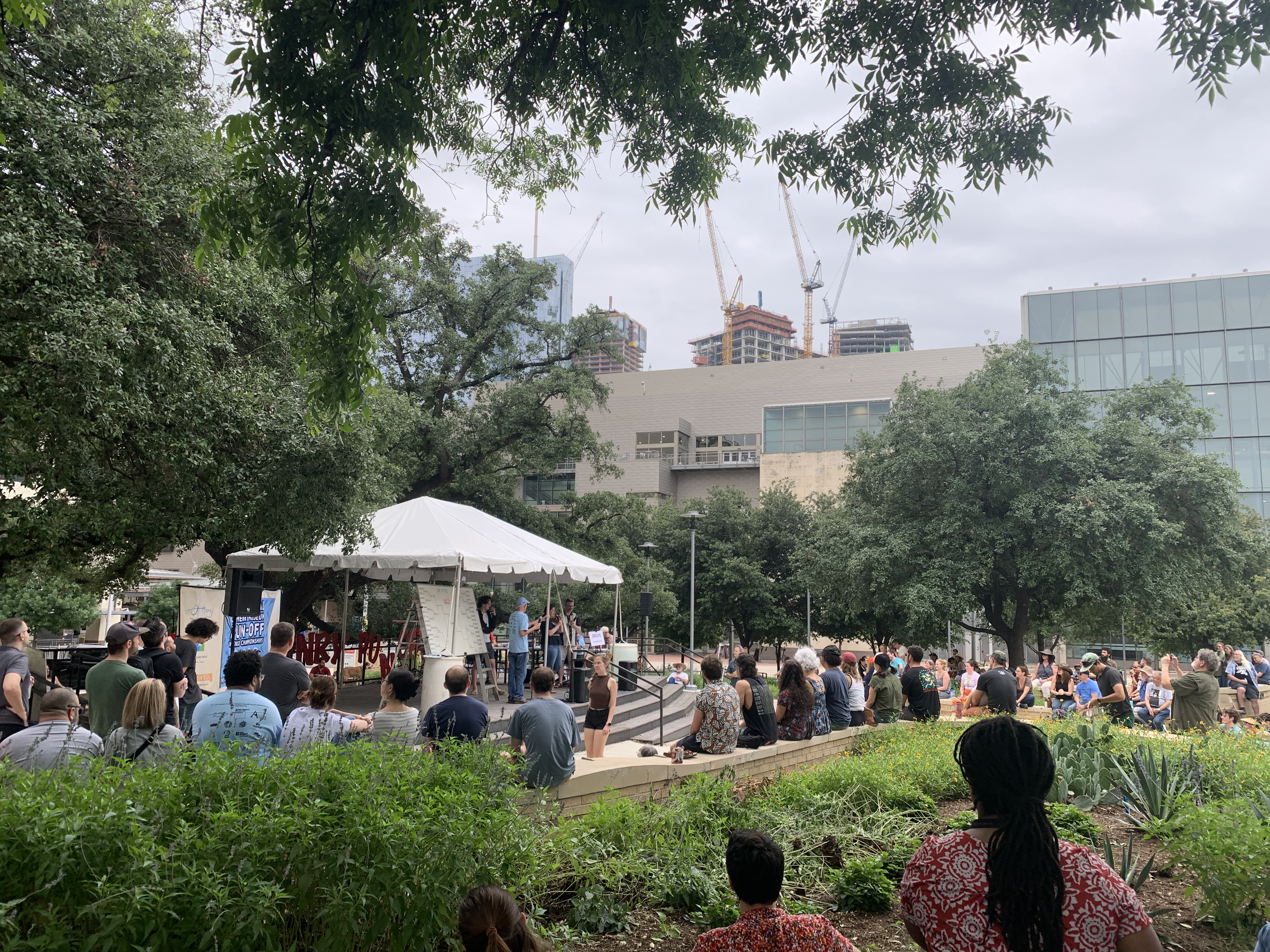
- Type: Urban park
- Location: East Fifth and Trinity streets, Austin, Texas, U.S.
- Coordinates: 30.265295°N 97.739105°W
- Area: 0.73 acres (0.30 ha)

Brush Square, also known as Brush Square Park, is an urban park located in downtown Austin, Texas. The park is adjacent to the Austin Convention Center and includes an event lawn and stage. The park also houses three historic buildings: the Susanna Dickinson Museum, O. Henry Museum, and Austin Central Fire Station #1.

== History ==
Brush Square was one of four original public squares laid out in the 1839 Waller Plan of Austin by Edwin Waller. Brush Square is named for Seba Bogart Brush, an Austin merchant who used the square to store cotton. The square has served various purposes over the years, including as an open market, railroad depot, cotton yard, and public plaza.

In 2024, Brush Square Park was named a Lone Star Legacy Park by the Texas Recreation and Park Society. The designation recognizes parks in Texas that are at least 50 years old and have historic, architectural and/or natural significance to their communities.

Brush Square Park hosts various events, including the annual O. Henry Pun-Off World Championships, and SXSW events and concerts.
