= William Sydney Porter House =

Historic house in Texas, United States

- U.S. National Register of Historic Places
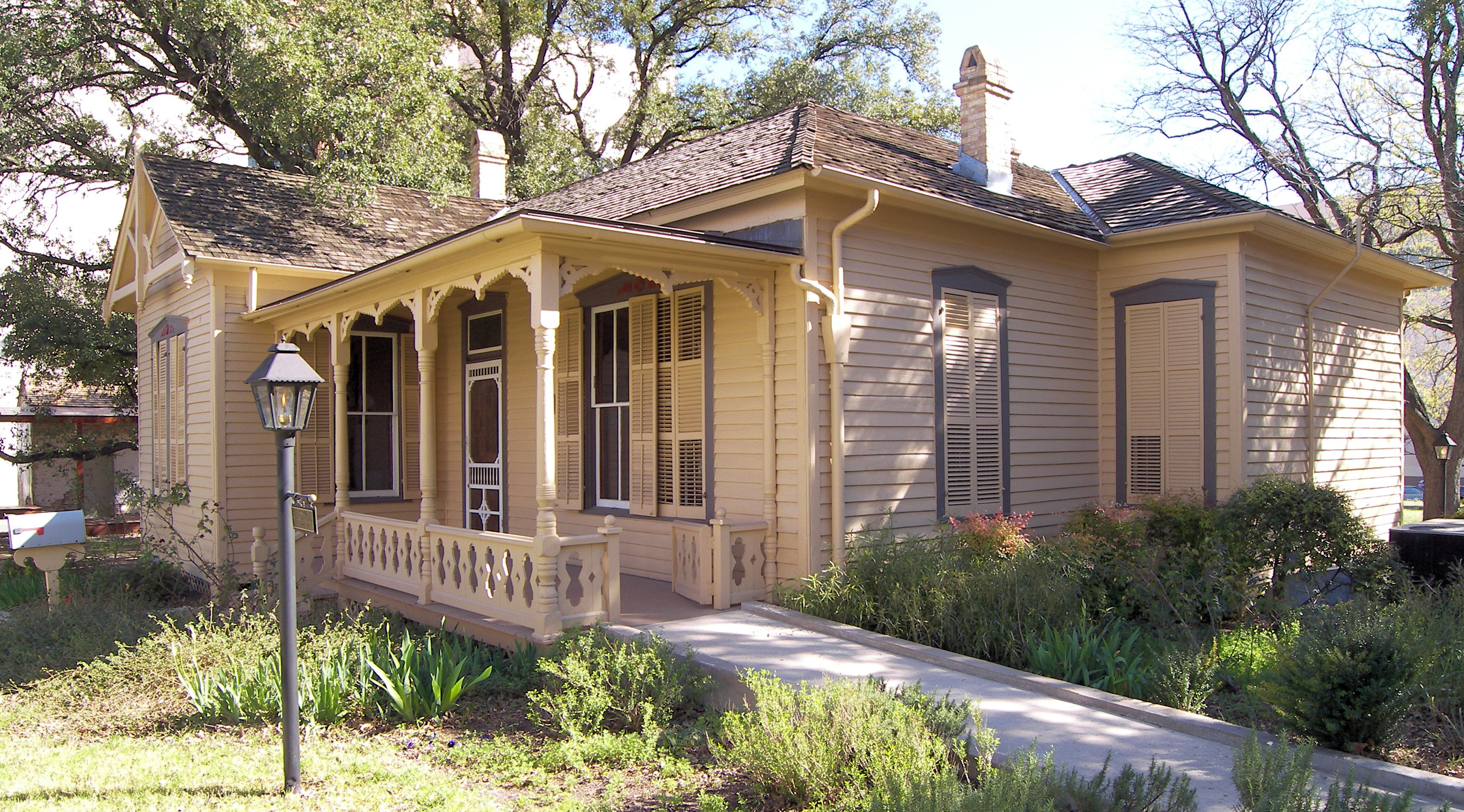
- The O. Henry Museum in 2007
- Location: 409 East Fifth Street; Austin, Texas, US
- Coordinates: 30°15′57″N 97°44′21″W
- Built: 1886
- NRHP reference No.: 73001979
- Added to NRHP: June 18, 1973

The William Sydney Porter House is a historic structure in Downtown Austin, Texas. William Sydney Porter, better known as the author and short story writer O. Henry, lived there between 1893 and 1895. The Porter house was added to the National Register of Historic Places on June 18, 1973. The house is known today as the O. Henry Museum.

== History ==
The cottage is a simplified version of the Eastlake Style of architecture. The house was built in 1886 and rented between 1893 and 1895 by William Sydney Porter, better known as the author O. Henry. Porter lived in the house with his wife, Athol, and daughter, Margaret, before they moved to Houston, where Porter began writing full-time for the Houston Post. Though primarily associated with his home state of North Carolina, O. Henry set 42 of his stories in Texas.

The residence remained a rental property until 1930 when it was to be demolished to construct a warehouse. In January 1934, a committee representing the Colonial Dames, the Daughters of the American Revolution, the Daughters of 1812, the Daughters of the Republic of Texas, and the Daughters of the Confederacy submitted a proposal to the Austin City Council, that if the city would accept the house as a donation from the Austin Rotary Club and relocate the house, the women's organizations would work to restore the house and open it as a "shrine". The City of Austin had the house moved from its original location at 307 East 4th Street to its current location around the block at Brush Square Park, 409 East 5th Street. The house was restored and opened as a museum in 1934. The many period pieces on display include some of the Porter's furniture and personal belongings. The structure underwent further restoration in 1994–95 with a renewed roof and the replacement of four brick chimneys lost in 1934.

The William Sydney Porter House was added to the National Register of Historic Places on June 18, 1973, for its literary and architectural significance. In 1999, the site was designated as the first National Literary Landmark in Texas by the Center for the Book at the Library of Congress, honoring its association with the author known as O. Henry.

It is the site of the annual O. Henry Pun-Off, a spoken pun competition. The event is traditionally held the first weekend in May.

== See also ==
- List of museums in Central Texas
- O. Henry Pun-Off
