= Jo Firestone =

American comedian, writer, and actor

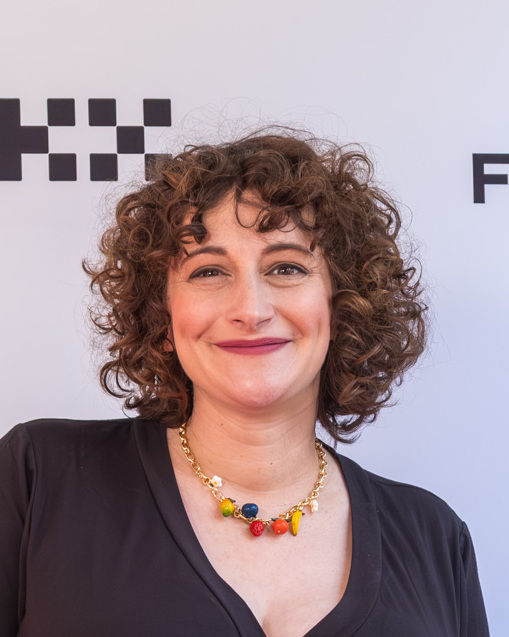
- Firestone in 2026
- Born: 1986 or 1987 (age 39–40); St. Louis, Missouri, U.S.
- Education: Wesleyan University
- Occupations: Actress; comedian; writer
- Years active: 2010–present

Jo Firestone (born 1986 or 1987) is an American actress, comedian, and television writer. She played Sarah Conner on the television series Joe Pera Talks with You and Euthanasia "Annie" Fantasy in Teenage Euthanasia.

== Biography ==
Jo Firestone's father is Fred Firestone, a speaker for corporate events. She has a brother, Ben Firestone, who works in commercial real estate. She grew up in Clayton, Missouri, a suburb of St. Louis. She graduated from Clayton High School and later Wesleyan University in Connecticut, with a degree in theatre.

Firestone is currently based in Brooklyn. She is a childhood friend of pastry chef Claire Saffitz.

== Career ==
=== Television work ===
As an actress, Firestone has appeared in the TV programs Search Party, The Jim Gaffigan Show, Broad City, The Tonight Show Starring Jimmy Fallon, CollegeHumor Originals, Boy Band, The Outs, Night Train with Wyatt Cenac, Animal Agent, High Maintenance, Jon Glaser Loves Gear, Thanksgiving, The Special Without Brett Davis, Shrill, The Great North and others.

Firestone was a consulting producer on 21 episodes of The Chris Gethard Show and performed in three episodes of the series. In 2017, Firestone performed stand-up on Comedy Central as part of Comedy Central Stand-Up Presents Jo Firestone.

In the past, Firestone was a writer for The Tonight Show Starring Jimmy Fallon and The Special Without Brett Davis. She has also performed on the Tonight Show, portraying U.S. Education Secretary Betsy DeVos, demonstrating products from the New York Toy Fair, and appearing in other sketches opposite host Jimmy Fallon.

Firestone portrayed the character Sarah Conner, a band teacher, on Joe Pera Talks with You, which aired during Adult Swim on Cartoon Network. The character's name is an homage to the Terminator movies. On the show, Firestone's character is a doomsday prepper and Joe Pera's girlfriend.

In 2021, Firestone voiced Euthanasia "Annie" Fantasy in Teenage Euthanasia.

In 2023, Firestone appeared on the show What We Do in the Shadows as a member of the council of energy vampires.

In 2023, she was named the head writer of After Midnight, for which she is also a co-executive producer. Following the cancellation of After Midnight, Firestone appeared as a correspondent in a June 2025 episode of The Tonight Show with Jimmy Fallon.

=== Live performance ===
With Dylan Marron, Firestone wrote, performed in, and directed Ridgefield Middle School Talent Nite, which received a Capital Fringe Festival Director's Award in 2010.

In 2011, Firestone created the Pundersome, a pun-based comedy event after they heard of the O. Henry Pun-Off World Championships hosted in Austin, Texas.

Firestone has performed at the UCB Theater in Manhattan, and around New York City. About stand-up gigs in "cellar clubs," Firestone explained, "Doing comedy in New York, I've been conditioned to thrive in basements. I'm not ready to do a comedy show until I go down a flight of stairs."

=== Radio and podcasts ===
Firestone was the host of the program Dr. Gameshow, which originated on WFMU radio and is now a podcast on the Maximum Fun network along with co-host Manolo Moreno. She and her father Fred Firestone created the game Punderdome: A Card Game for Pun Lovers (published by Random House subsidiary Clarkson Potter, 2016).

Firestone voice acts in The National Lampoon Radio Hour podcast. She serves as the producer and senior writer along with Cole Escola.

In February 2020, Firestone released the first episode of her podcast Everyday Decisions. Everyday Decisions is a comedy and personal stories podcast where Firestone interviews friends, family, and fellow comedians about the past 24 hours of their day.

In March 2020, Firestone went on comedian Mike Recine's podcast The Sitdown. In March 2021, she made a guest appearance on the YouTube channel of her childhood friend Claire Saffitz.

=== Author ===
In October 2023, Firestone self-published Murder on Sex Island: A Luella van Horn Mystery.

On June 30, 2026, Penguin Random House published Sex on Murder Island, Firestone's sequel to her first book, also featuring private detective Luella van Horn.

== Filmography ==
=== Film ===
Year	Title	Role	Notes	Ref.
2016	Don't Think Twice	Jo		
2020	Save Yourselves!	Desi		
2020	Cicada	Tracy		
2021	Together Together	Tamara		
2022	Aqua Teen Forever: Plantasm	Felicity in IT	Direct-to-video film	
2026	Never Change!	Amelia Nadler	Hulu	

=== Television ===
Year	Title	Role	Notes	Ref.
2015	Broad City	42 Squirts Employee	Episode: "Wisdom Teeth"	
2016	Netflix Presents: The Characters	Jo	Episode: "Natasha Rothwell"	
2016	The Jim Gaffigan Show	Pistachio	Episode: "The List"	
2017	Search Party	Carla	Episode: "Denial"	
2017–2018	The Tonight Show Starring Jimmy Fallon	Various roles	10 Episodes, also Writer	
2018	The Chris Gethard Show	Various roles	3 Episodes	
2018–2021	Joe Pera Talks With You	Sarah Conner	25 Episodes, also Executive Producer	
2019–2021	Shrill	Maureen	12 Episodes	
2020–2021	Summer Camp Island	Mallory	Voice role, 7 Episodes	
2021–2023	Teenage Euthanasia	Euthanasia "Annie" Fantasy	Main role, voice role	
2022–2025	The Great North	Greta Meatweep	Voice role, 4 episodes	
2023	What We Do in the Shadows	Jo	Episode: "The Campaign"	
2025	Win or Lose	Sweaty	Voice role, 2 Episodes	
