= Never Change! =

- Release poster
- Directed by: Marty Schousboe
- Written by: John Reynolds
- Story by: Marty Schousboe; John Reynolds
- Produced by: Jason Woliner; Jeremy Garelick; Will Phelps; Nicholas Hatton; Jon Watts; Jason Zaro; Billy Rosenberg
- Starring: Sofia Black-D'Elia; Carmen Christopher; Jo Firestone; John Reynolds; Gary Richardson
- Cinematography: Matt Clegg
- Edited by: Whit Conway
- Music by: Mike Malarkey
- Production companies: APT Entertainment; All Things Comedy; American High; Drive True Productions; Freshman Year; Myriad Entertainment; Strawdogs Productions; Swindle Pictures
- Distributed by: Hulu
- Release dates: June 9, 2026 (Tribeca Festival); June 17, 2026 (United States)
- Running time: 98 minutes
- Country: United States
- Language: English

Never Change! is a 2026 American comedy film directed by Marty Schousboe and written by John Reynolds. It stars Reynolds, Sofia Black-D'Elia, Carmen Christopher, Jo Firestone, and Gary Richardson, with supporting performances from Rudy Pankow, Topher Grace, Jackie Cruz, John Early, Ana Gasteyer, Patti Harrison, Steve Little, and Zach Cherry.

The film premiered at the Tribeca Festival on June 9, 2026 and was released on Hulu on June 17.

== Premise ==
Due to a legal technicality, the class of 2008 must return to high school, now in their mid-30s, bringing with them midlife baggage and teenage angst.

== Cast ==
- Sofia Black-D'Elia as Katie Cartwright
- Carmen Christopher as Tedi Mayo
- Jo Firestone as Amelia Nadler
- John Reynolds as Sunny Football
- Gary Richardson as Curtis Eldridge
- Roberta Colindrez as Claire Dubois
- Jackie Cruz as Victoria Mayo
- John Early as Tim
- Ana Gasteyer as Principal Nadler
- Topher Grace as Mr. Whiley
- Patti Harrison as Sandra
- Steve Little as Marvin
- Sunita Mani as Ms. Wing
- Ayden Mayeri as Trish
- Rudy Pankow as Mark
- Maria Thayer as Ms. Jankey
- Nate Varrone as Ron Felker
- Matt Barats as Matt Clinger
- Billy Bryk as Kai
- Max Clarke as Guitar Player
- Zach Cherry as Todd Hutchinson
- Joe Cunningham as Jerry
- Ana Fabrega as Friz
- Danny Groh as Gym Teacher
- Ben Nadler as Alien/Guitar Guy
- Scott Nelson as Bill Brown
- Nick Mestad as Derek
- Nathan Min as Peter
- Joe Pera as Group Member
- Micah Sterenberg as Sad Student
- Drennen Quinn as Radio DJ
- Jill Talley as Ron’s Mom

Additionally, Johnny Knoxville has a vocal cameo appearance as the voice of the person reading the mysterious love letter that Ms. Jankey receives.

== Production ==
In November 2025, principal photography was taking place in Syracuse, New York, on a comedy film directed by Marty Schousboe and written by John Reynolds for Hulu. In April 2026, the first film was selected to screen at the Tribeca Festival.

== Release ==
Never Change! premiered at the Tribeca Festival on June 9, 2026, and was released on Hulu on June 17.

== Reception ==
On the review aggregator website Rotten Tomatoes, 25% of 20 critics' reviews are positive, with an average rating of 4.9/10.
