= Cork Boat (vessel) =

Cork Boat is a vessel designed and built by American speechwriter John Pollack and his partner Garth Goldstein. The ship, composed of exactly 165,321 wine corks, took over two years to complete. Over 100 volunteers contributed to the project, and Pollack received numerous donations of materials for it, but most of the corks were provided by Cork Supply USA. Cork Supply USA also paid to ship the boat to Portugal for its trip down the Douro River. The ship looks like a Viking ship, with a pronounced upward curve in its prow. It is made of ten hexagonal logs of corks, each of which is enclosed in netting and made of tens of cork discs. Each disc contains 127 corks, which are held together with large rubber bands. When finished in 2002, Pollack and his friends traveled with their ship down the Douro River in Portugal; his trip received a large amount of media attention. Pollack wrote a memoir about the experience entitled Cork Boat.
