= John Pollack =

American writer (born c. 1965)

John Pollack (born c. 1965) is an American originally from Ann Arbor, Michigan, who served as a Special Assistant to the President and Presidential Speechwriter for Bill Clinton, as a foreign correspondent, and as an advisor to prominent leaders and philanthropists. Now a consultant, Pollack is a noted authority on analogy, wordplay, creativity, and innovation.

== Early life ==
Born in Ann Arbor, Pollack attended public schools and graduated from Ann Arbor Huron High School, where he lettered in cross country, track and wrestling. Earlier, while living in England, he attended Durham Johnston Comprehensive School in Durham. In 1988 he graduated with distinction from Stanford University with an AB in American Studies, and served as a writer and editor for The Stanford Daily.

In 1995, Pollack competed in the O. Henry Pun-Off World Championships and won. He later wrote a book about puns and the history of wordplay, referencing his experience competing in the pun competition.

== Professional life ==
Pollack began his journalism career writing for The Hartford Courant, and later spent several years in Spain as a foreign correspondent, freelancing for American media and eventually working for the Associated Press in its Madrid bureau. On his return to the United States, he served as Communications Director on the U.S. Senate campaign of his mother, Lana Pollack, and as a project manager for the Henry Ford Museum & Greenfield Village, now known as The Henry Ford. After a stint working for the League of Conservation Voters in Idaho, he moved to Washington, D.C., where he became a speechwriter for the Democratic Whip in the U.S. House of Representatives, David E. Bonior, and later for President Bill Clinton at The White House. He is the author of four books: The World On a String: How to Become a Freelance Foreign Correspondent (1997); Cork Boat: A True Story of the Unlikeliest Boat Ever Built (2004); The Pun Also Rises: How the Humble Pun Revolutionized Language, Changed History and Made Wordplay more than Some Antics (2011); and Shortcut: How Analogies Reveal Connections, Spark Innovation and Sell Our Greatest Ideas (2014). He currently works as a writer and consultant.

== The Cork Boat ==
One of Pollack's notable projects was his 30-year quest to build what became The Cork Boat, a 22-foot Viking ship made almost entirely of wine corks, which he and his boatbuilding partner Garth Goldstein, along with a small crew, eventually sailed and rowed down the Douro River in Portugal. The boat and the journey, made possible through the help of hundreds of volunteers, received significant media attention in Portugal and was the subject of his 2004 book Cork Boat. In 2004, Pollack wrote a memoir of the experience entitled Cork Boat.
