= O. Henry Pun-Off =

Annual spoken-word competition in Austin, Texas

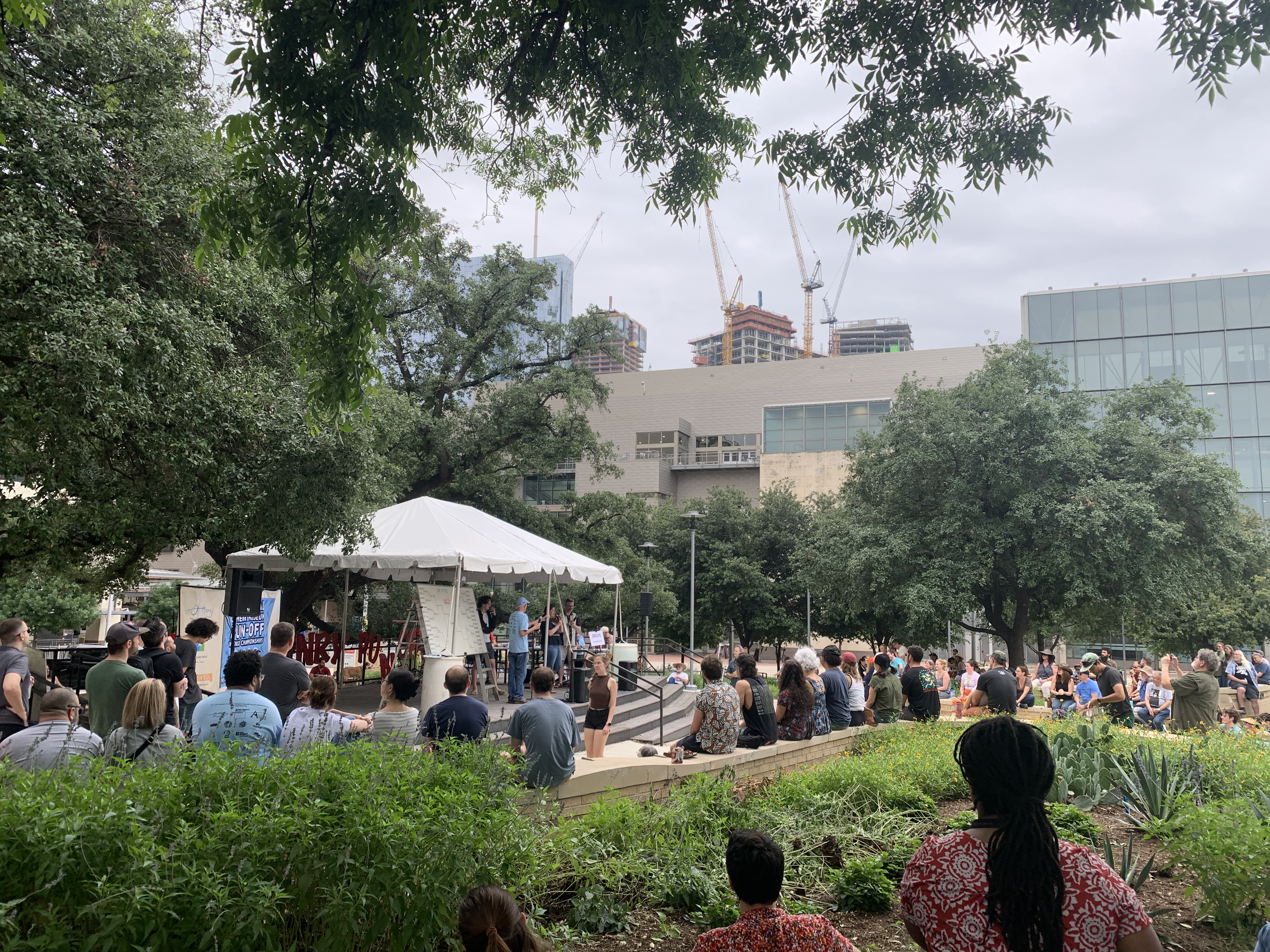
Punniest of Show competition at the O. Henry Pun-Off World Championships held in Brush Square Park on May 11, 2024.

The O. Henry Pun-Off World Championships is an annual spoken word competition founded in 1978, and held every May at the O. Henry Museum (now the William Sydney Porter House) in Austin, Texas, U.S..

== History ==
Started in 1978, the Pun-Off gathers fans of wordplay to celebrate the pun, which English poet and literary critic John Dryden called "the lowest and most groveling kind of wit." The Pun-Off is believed to have started as an informal gathering behind the O. Henry Museum during the Pecan Street Festival.

The event has been organized and run since 1990 by Austinite Gary Hallock, who began attending the Pun-Off in the 1980s and won Punniest of Show in 1989. A support group of former and current contestants was formed in 1990 to formalize the unwritten rules of the competition(s) and provide guidance and support for future events. Under the umbrella title of "Punsters United Nearly Yearly" (a.k.a. PUNY) this collection of loosely knit wits continues to be the public face of the event through its website and social media. Gary Hallock retired as event producer in 2015. He was replaced by emcee and 2006 Punslinger World Champion, David Gugenheim.

The 40th Annual O. Henry Pun-Off World Championships were staged in 2017 and were promoted in Smithsonian Magazine. The occasion was also commemorated with a special exhibit, "Once a-Pun A Time", that included photos and memorabilia from past competitions. Videos of the 2016 champions can be found on that page. Former presidential speechwriter John Pollack documented his experience competing in the 1995 Pun-Off in his 2011 book, The Pun Also Rises: How the Humble Pun Revolutionized Language, Changed History, and Made Wordplay More Than Some Antics.

Participants in the annual event compete in one or both of the two contests of punning prowess: Punniest of Show, which features individuals performing a 90-second prepared monologue filled with puns; and PunSlingers, which pits individual punsters in head-to-head bouts of spontaneous punning on a randomly selected variation of traditional topic themes.

From its inception, the O. Henry Pun-Off World Championships used a four-person panel of judges that offers scores of 1–10 based on performance, originality, and wit. The four scores were added together for a combined score of 4–40 for each participant. (Scores lower than 1 are raised to 1, and scores higher than 10 are lowered to 10.) The highest-scoring punster wins each event, with ties being decided by audience applause. Beginning in 2009, however, the judge panel was expanded to six people, with the highest and lowest scores discarded and the remaining four scores added together to form each participant's combined score of 4–40. This change was enacted to prevent any one judge from having the ability to disqualify a punster by giving a much lower score than the other judges.

A separate award is also given yearly for the Most Viable Punster, a title awarded by votes from each year's participants and given in honor of late punster George McClughan.

The 43rd Annual Pun-Off took place virtually for two years, in 2020 and 2021, due to the COVID-19 pandemic.

== Inspiration ==
The O. Henry Pun-Off World Championships was inspired by the writings of William Sydney Porter who, while living in Austin, Texas, in the late 1800s, began using the pen name O. Henry. By the time of his death in 1910, O. Henry had published over 300 short stories including "The Ransom of Red Chief" and the Christmas classic "Gift of the Magi". His voracious vocabulary and love of language endeared him to a broad audience, but it was his trademark twisted endings that always kept curious readers coming back for more. Reading an O. Henry story is a participatory experience. Today, the Pun-Off keeps his name alive by offering lovers of wordplay and wit a platform for their literary shenanigans in front of an admiring, and sometimes mocking, audience.

== Contest ==
Registration for the Pun-Off opens each year on April Fool's Day, and contestant slots can fill up quickly. In the early years, contestants were mostly from Austin and central Texas. In more recent years, contestants have come from other states and as far away as Australia and England to compete.

For the purpose of competition and judging, a two-fold definition of a proper pun has been adopted by the O. Henry Pun-Off World Championships.

The first and most common form presented is wordplay using homonyms that deliberately exploits ambiguity between similar-sounding words for humorous or rhetorical effect.

The second accepted type of pun is a lesser used form of euphemism or double entendre, where an alternate meaning is suggested for a word for comedic effect.

== See also ==
- Punderdome
