= Cork Boat (book) =

2004 book by John Pollack

- Author: John Pollack
- Language: English
- Publication date: 2004

Cork Boat (ISBN 0-375-422-57-9) is a memoir, first published in 2004, written by American author John Pollack. It is a first-person account of his experience designing and building the Cork Boat, a vessel made of exactly 165,321 wine corks.
