= The Little Darling =

1909 film directed by D. W. Griffith

- Directed by: D. W. Griffith
- Produced by: Biograph Company
- Starring: Mary Pickford
- Cinematography: G. W. Bitzer
- Production company: Biograph Company
- Distributed by: Biograph Company
- Release date: September 2, 1909
- Running time: 3 minutes (original release length 211 feet)
- Country: United States
- Language: Silent (English intertitles)

The Little Darling is a 1909 comedy short produced by the Biograph Company of New York, directed by D. W. Griffith and starring Mary Pickford. It was released to theaters on a split reel with Griffith's eleven-minute drama The Sealed Room.

== Plot ==
A woman who runs a boarding house receives a letter from a friend notifying her that she is sending her little darling daughter. The boarders, all young men, go to a store and buy toys and a baby carriage, while the woman gets a crib. Two of the boarders go to the train station to wait for the child. However, the little darling turns out to be a young woman.

== Cast ==
- Mary Pickford as Little Darling
- Charles Avery in boarding house
- Verner Clarges in boarding house
- John R. Cumpson in boarding house
- Robert Harron
- Arthur V. Johnson in boarding house
- James Kirkwood Sr. in store
- Owen Moore in boarding house
- George Nichols in store
- Anthony O'Sullivan in boarding house
- Lottie Pickford
- Billy Quirk in boarding house
- Gertrude Robinson in store
- Mack Sennett in boarding house
- Kate Toncray
- Henry B. Walthall in boarding house
- Dorothy West

== Filming ==
The production was filmed in two days, July 27 and August 3, 1909, and at two locations: on interior sets in Biograph's Manhattan studio at 11 East 14th Street and on location at Cuddebackville, New York.

== Preservation ==
A paper print is preserved.
