= The Sealed Room (1909 film) =

1909 film directed by D. W. Griffith

- Directed by: D. W. Griffith
- Written by: Honoré de Balzac; Edgar Allan Poe; Frank E. Woods
- Starring: Arthur V. Johnson; Marion Leonard; Henry B. Walthall; Mary Pickford; Mack Sennett
- Cinematography: G. W. Bitzer
- Music by: Robert Israel
- Distributed by: Biograph Company
- Release date: September 2, 1909
- Running time: 11 minutes (original release length 779 feet)
- Country: United States
- Language: Silent (English intertitles)

The Sealed Room (1909)

The Sealed Room (also known as The Sealed Door) is an eleven-minute film released in September 1909. Produced by the Biograph Company and directed by D. W. Griffith, the drama's cast includes Arthur V. Johnson, Marion Leonard, Henry B. Walthall, Mary Pickford, and Mack Sennett. It was distributed to theaters on a split-reel with another film, the three-minute comedy short The Little Darling.

The story draws from Honoré de Balzac's La Grande Bretêche and Edgar Allan Poe's The Cask of Amontillado, both of which inspired the film's central theme of immurement.

== Preservation ==
Prints of The Sealed Room survive in the film archives of the Museum of Modern Art (35mm acetate fine-grain master negative) and the Library of Congress (35mm paper positive). The film is in the public domain in the United States.

== Plot ==
The film's theme of immurement draws inspiration from Balzac's "La Grande Bretêche", and Edgar Allan Poe's "The Cask of Amontillado". The king constructs a cozy, windowless love nest for himself and his concubine. However, she is not faithful to her sovereign, but consorts with the court troubadour. In fact, they use the king's new play chamber for their trysts. When the king discovers this, he sends for his masons. With the faithless duo still inside, the masons use stone and mortar to quietly seal the only door to the vault. The two lovers suffocate and the film ends.

== Cast ==
- Arthur V. Johnson as The King
- Marion Leonard as The Concubine
- Henry B. Walthall as The Troubadour
- Linda Arvidson as A Lady-in-Waiting
- William J. Butler as Nobleman at Court
- Vernon Clarges as Nobleman at Court
- Owen Moore as Nobleman at Court
- George Nichols as Workman
- Anthony O'Sullivan as Workman
- Mary Pickford as A Lady-in-Waiting
- Gertrude Robinson as A Lady-in-Waiting
- Mack Sennett as A Soldier
- George Siegmann as Nobleman at Court
