= Getting Even (1909 film) =

1909 film directed by D. W. Griffith

- PLAY film; runtime 00:07:16
- Directed by: D. W. Griffith
- Written by: D. W. Griffith
- Starring: Billy Quirk; Mary Pickford
- Cinematography: Billy Bitzer
- Distributed by: Biograph Company
- Release date: September 13, 1909
- Running time: 7 minutes
- Country: United States
- Language: Silent (English intertitles)

Getting Even is a 1909 American silent short comedy film directed by D. W. Griffith. A print of the film exists in the film archive of the Library of Congress.

== Cast ==
- Billy Quirk as Bud
- Mary Pickford as Miss Lucy
- James Kirkwood as Jim Blake
- Edwin August
- Florence Barker
- Kate Bruce as Party Guest
- Verner Clarges as Party Guest
- John R. Cumpson as miner
- Arthur V. Johnson as Party Guest
- Florence La Badie
- George Nichols as miner
- Anthony O'Sullivan as miner
- Lottie Pickford as Party Guest
- Gertrude Robinson as Party Guest
- Mack Sennett as miner
- Henry B. Walthall as miner
