= In Little Italy =

1909 film directed by D. W. Griffith

- Directed by: D. W. Griffith
- Written by: Frank E. Woods
- Starring: Marion Leonard; George Nichols; Henry B. Walthall
- Cinematography: G. W. Bitzer
- Distributed by: Biograph Company
- Release date: December 23, 1909
- Running time: 10 minutes
- Country: United States
- Language: Silent (English intertitles)

In Little Italy is a 1909 American short silent drama film directed by D. W. Griffith.

== Plot ==
Marie has two lovely men pursuing her. She decides to reject Tony and accept Victor as her new sweetheart. Tony, frustrated and jealous of Marie's decision, stabs Victor, but later he discovers that Victor was still alive and decides to break into Marie's house, where Victor is convalescing, to finish the job.

== Cast ==
- Marion Leonard as Marie Cadrone
- George Nichols as Tony Guiletto
- Henry B. Walthall as Victor
- Charles Arling
- Kate Bruce as At the Ball
- William J. Butler as In Bar
- Charles Craig as At the Ball
- Adele DeGarde
- Gladys Egan as One of the Children
- Frank Evans as Sheriff's Deputy
- Ruth Hart as At the Ball
- Guy Hedlund as At the Ball (unconfirmed)
- James Kirkwood as Sheriff
- Henry Lehrman as At the Ball
- Stephanie Longfellow as At the Ball (unconfirmed)
- Jeanie MacPherson as At the Ball
- W. Chrystie Miller as In Bar
- Owen Moore as At the Ball
- Anthony O'Sullivan as A peddlar
- Billy Quirk as At the Ball
- Gertrude Robinson as At the Ball
- Mack Sennett as In Bar / At the Ball
- Marion Sunshine
- Blanche Sweet as At the Ball
- J. Waltham as In Bar
- Dorothy West as At the Ball

== See also ==
- D. W. Griffith filmography
- Blanche Sweet filmography
