= The Death Disc: A Story of the Cromwellian Period =

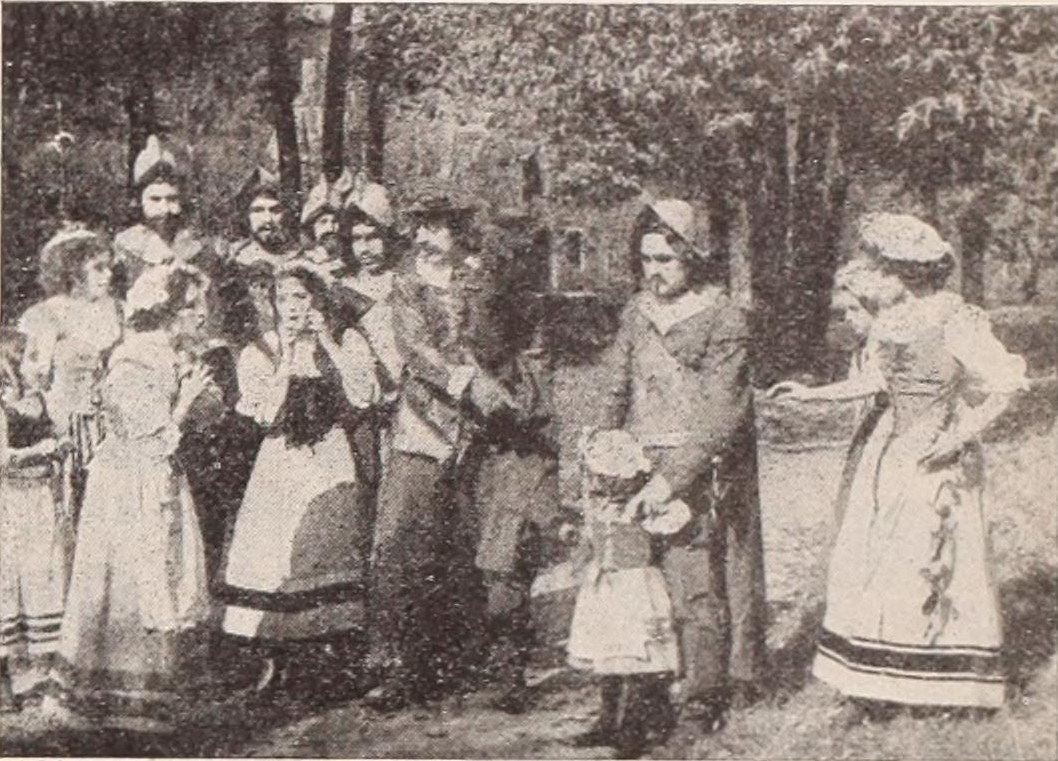
- Directed by: D. W. Griffith
- Written by: Mark Twain (story); Frank E. Woods
- Cinematography: G.W. Bitzer
- Production company: Biograph Company
- Release date: December 2, 1909
- Country: United States

The Death Disc: A Story of the Cromwellian Period is a 1909 American silent historical short film, directed by D. W. Griffith and based on Mark Twain's short story "The Death Disk" [sic].

== Plot ==
According to a film magazine, "In the early part of the seventeenth century England was in a state of turbid excitement. Oliver Cromwell, Lord Protector of the English Commonwealth, was assiduous in his persecution of those who defiantly adhered to Catholicism. Few there were who had the temerity to openly profess their religious views, for such profession invariably meted execution. The Catholics, therefore, were forced to worship in secret. Many historians claim that, while Cromwell was persistent in this persecution, he did it rather to satisfy his constituents than through the dictates of his own conscience. Spies on every hand industriously reported every exhibition of Catholic fervor and the Lord Protector was forced to accede to their tacit demands. Three soldiers are discovered as adherents to the faith and are imprisoned, awaiting Cromwell's sentence.

A respite, however, is offered them that they should cast lots and one would be executed, allowing the other two to return to the ranks of their own following to spread the warning among those true to the Church of Rome. This they refuse to do, so Cromwell sends for a child — the first the guards may meet — to be the messenger of life or death to the condemned, and, by a strange fatality, he obtained the child of one of the soldiers. The child is brought before Cromwell, and its presence prevents him striking down his best friend in a fit of anger. He is so impressed with the little one, particularly as it revives memories of his own dead child, that he presents it with his signet ring, promising to obey any command of hers invoked by its aid. Three discs are to determine which should live or die, and, childlike, she decides to give her father the prettiest — "The Death Disc" — thus condemning her own father to death. The soldiers who return the child to her mother are moved to compassion and tell the poor woman the value of the signet ring. Through this she saves her husband on the eve of execution and Cromwell redeemed his promise."

== Cast ==
- George Nichols
- Marion Leonard
- Edith Haldeman
- Frank Powell
- James Kirkwood, Sr.
- Linda Arvidson
- Charles Craig
- Adele DeGarde
- Frank Evans
- Ruth Hart
- Arthur V. Johnson
- Jeanie MacPherson
- Owen Moore
- Anthony O'Sullivan
- Gertrude Robinson
- Mack Sennett
- Dorothy West

== Bibliography ==
- Mark Twain (1930). M. Diesterweg (ed.). The death-disk. p. 15.
