= The Rocky Road (film) =

1910 film directed by D. W. Griffith

- Directed by: D. W. Griffith
- Written by: D. W. Griffith
- Starring: Frank Powell
- Cinematography: G. W. Bitzer; Arthur Marvin
- Distributed by: Biograph Company
- Release date: January 3, 1910
- Running time: 11 minutes
- Country: United States
- Language: Silent (English intertitles)

The Rocky Road is a 1910 American short silent drama film directed by D. W. Griffith and starring Frank Powell. Prints of the film survive in the film archives of the Library of Congress and the Museum of Modern Art.

== Cast ==
- Frank Powell as Ben
- Stephanie Longfellow as Ben's Wife
- George Nichols as The Farmer
- Linda Arvidson
- Kate Bruce as The Maid
- Charles Craig as A Farmhand / At Church
- Adele DeGarde
- Gladys Egan as At Church
- Frank Evans as In Bar
- Edith Haldeman as The Daughter, as a Child
- James Kirkwood as The Best Man
- Henry Lehrman as Outside Bar
- Marion Leonard
- Wilfred Lucas
- W. Chrystie Miller as The Minister
- Owen Moore
- Anthony O'Sullivan as In Bar
- Harry Solter
- Blanche Sweet as The Daughter, at Eighteen
- J. Waltham as In Bar
- Dorothy West as At Church (unconfirmed)

== Plot ==
This is the twisted tale of an alcoholic father who leaves his wife and daughter. The man's wife then becomes mentally ill and the daughter is adopted by a wealthy family. Years later that daughter meets a wealthy older man. They fall in love and are to be married. On the day of their wedding, the mother shows up and reveals that the daughter was about to marry her own father.

== See also ==
- List of American films of 1910
