= The Woman from Mellon's =

1910 film directed by D. W. Griffith

- Directed by: D. W. Griffith
- Written by: D. W. Griffith
- Produced by: Biograph Company
- Starring: Mary Pickford; Billy Quirk
- Cinematography: G. W. Bitzer
- Distributed by: Biograph
- Release date: February 3, 1910
- Running time: 11 minutes
- Country: United States
- Language: Silent (English intertitles)

The Woman from Mellon's is a 1910 silent short film directed by D. W. Griffith and starring Mary Pickford and Billy Quirk. It was produced and distributed by the Biograph Company.

It is preserved in the Library of Congress collection.

== Cast ==
- Billy Quirk as Harry Townsend
- George Nichols as James Pertersby
- Mary Pickford as Mary Petersby, The Daughter
- Linda Arvidson as Detective
- Dorothy Bernard
- Kate Bruce as Maid
- Charles Craig as Detective/Policeman
- Frank Evans as Butler
- Francis J. Grandon as In First Office/In Second Office
- Ruth Hart as Maid
- Guy Hedlund as Butler
- Dell Henderson as In Second Office
- James Kirkwood as Minister
- Henry Lehrman as In Second Office
- Owen Moore

== See also ==
- List of American films of 1910
