= A Flash of Light (film) =

1910 film directed by D. W. Griffith

- Directed by: D. W. Griffith
- Written by: Stanner E. V. Taylor
- Starring: Charles West
- Cinematography: G. W. Bitzer
- Distributed by: Biograph Company
- Release date: July 18, 1910
- Running time: 17 minutes
- Country: United States
- Languages: Silent; English intertitles

A Flash of Light is a 1910 American short silent drama film directed by D. W. Griffith, starring Charles West and featuring Mary Pickford and Blanche Sweet.

== Cast ==
- Charles West as John Rogers
- Vivian Prescott as Belle
- Stephanie Longfellow as The Older Sister
- Verner Clarges as The Father
- Joseph Graybill as Horace Dooley
- Dorothy Bernard
- William J. Butler as A Doctor
- Charles Craig as Wedding Guest
- Edward Dillon as At First Party
- John T. Dillon as At First Party / At Second Party (as Jack Dillon)
- Ruth Hart as At Second Party
- Guy Hedlund as At First Party / At Second Party
- Grace Henderson as Visitor
- Henry Lehrman as At Second Party (unconfirmed)
- Jeanie MacPherson
- Claire McDowell as At First Party
- George Nichols as A Doctor
- Anthony O'Sullivan as A Servant
- Alfred Paget as Wedding Guest
- Mary Pickford
- Gertrude Robinson as Wedding Guest
- W. C. Robinson as A Servant
- Mack Sennett as Wedding Guest
- George Siegmann as Wedding Guest
- Blanche Sweet
- Kate Toncray as A Servant
- Dorothy West as At First Party

== See also ==
- List of American films of 1910
