= Nursing a Viper =

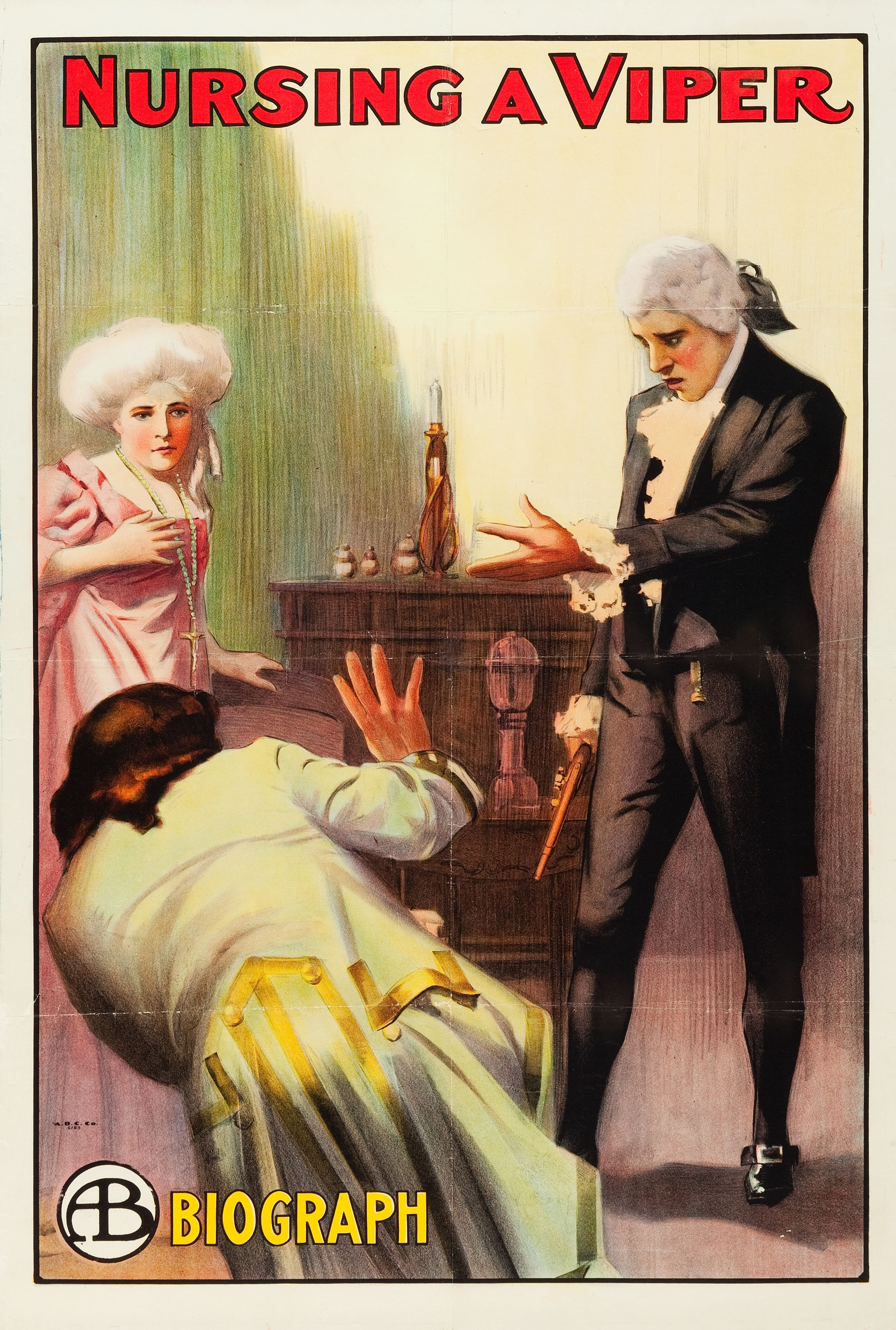
- Poster
- Directed by: D. W. Griffith
- Written by: D.W. Griffith; Frank E. Woods
- Produced by: Biograph Company
- Starring: Arthur V. Johnson; Marion Leonard
- Cinematography: G. W. Bitzer
- Distributed by: Biograph Company
- Release date: November 4, 1909
- Running time: 1 reel (920 feet)
- Country: United States
- Language: Silent (English intertitles)

Nursing a Viper is a 1909 American silent short film by pioneer director D. W. Griffith. A paper print of the film survives in the Library of Congress.

== Cast ==
- Arthur V. Johnson as The Husband
- Marion Leonard as The Wife
- Frank Powell as The Viper
- Frank Evans as Man in Mob
- Ruth Hart as Woman
- James Kirkwood as Man in Mob
- Florence Lawrence
- Henry Lehrman as Man in Mob
- Owen Moore as Fleeing Aristocrat
- George Nichols as Man in Mob
- Anthony O'Sullivan as Man in Mob
- Billy Quirk as Fleeing Aristocrat
- Gertrude Robinson as Fleeing Aristocrat
- Mack Sennett as Man in Mob
- Mabel Trunnelle as Victimized Woman

Nursing A Viper (1909)

== See also ==
- D. W. Griffith filmography
