= The Test of Friendship =

1908 film directed by D. W. Griffith

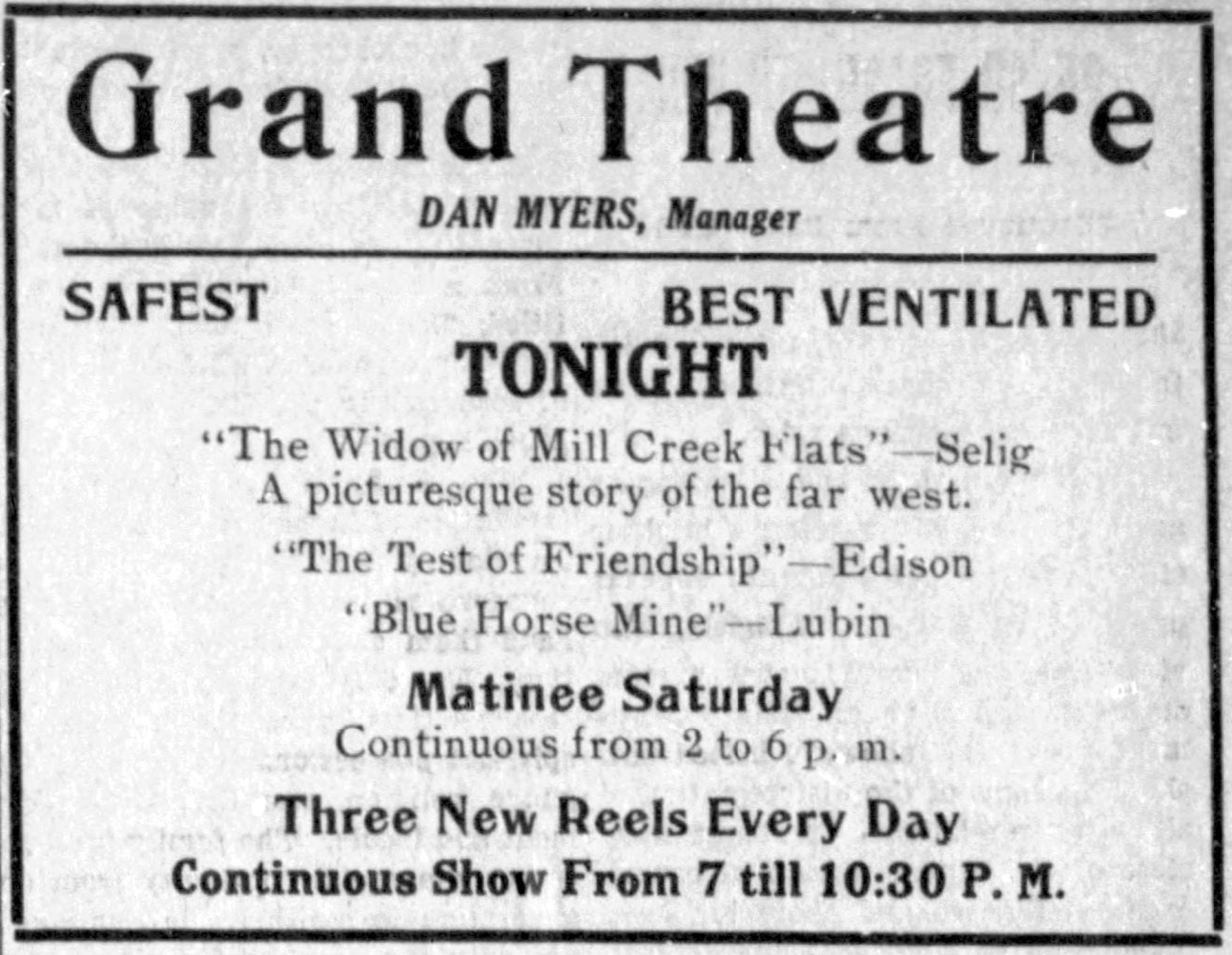
- Contemporary advertisement
- Directed by: D. W. Griffith
- Written by: D. W. Griffith
- Starring: Arthur V. Johnson
- Cinematography: G. W. Bitzer
- Release date: December 15, 1908
- Running time: 13 minutes (one reel)
- Country: United States
- Language: Silent

The Test of Friendship is a 1908 American silent short drama film directed by D. W. Griffith.

== Cast ==
- Arthur V. Johnson as Edward Ross
- Florence Lawrence as Jennie Colman
- Harry Solter as The Butler / Foreman
- George Gebhardt as The Valet
- Linda Arvidson as Guest / Woman at Wigmakers
- Robert Harron as Man Leaving Factory
- Charles Inslee as Employer / Guest
- Marion Leonard as Guest / Woman at Wigmakers
- Jeanie MacPherson
- Violet Mersereau
- Gertrude Robinson as Guest
- Mack Sennett as Guest / Man in Fight
