= The Hessian Renegades =

1909 film directed by D. W. Griffith

- Video
- Directed by: D. W. Griffith
- Written by: D. W. Griffith; Frank E. Woods
- Starring: Owen Moore
- Cinematography: G. W. Bitzer; Arthur Marvin
- Distributed by: Biograph Company
- Release date: September 6, 1909
- Running time: 10 minutes
- Country: United States
- Language: Silent (English intertitles)

The Hessian Renegades is a 1909 American silent war film directed by D. W. Griffith. It is set during the American Revolution.

== Plot ==
A young soldier during the American Revolution has the mission to carry a crucial message to General Washington but he is spotted by a group of enemy soldiers called Hessians. He finds refuge with a family, but his enemies soon discover him. After that, the family and neighbors must plan a way to send the important message.

== Cast ==
- Owen Moore as American Soldier
- Linda Arvidson as Farmer
- Kate Bruce as Soldier's Family
- William J. Butler as Farmer
- Verner Clarges as Farmer
- D. W. Griffith
- Robert Harron as Farmer
- Arthur V. Johnson as Hessian
- James Kirkwood as Soldier's Family
- Florence Lawrence
- Marion Leonard
- Wilfred Lucas
- George Nichols as Hessian
- Anthony O'Sullivan as Hessian
- Lottie Pickford
- Mary Pickford as Soldier's Family
- Frank Powell as Hessian
- Billy Quirk as Hessian
- Gertrude Robinson as Soldier's Family
- Mack Sennett as Hessian
- George Siegmann as Hessian
- Henry B. Walthall

== See also ==
- 1909 in film
- D. W. Griffith filmography
- List of films about the American Revolution
- List of television series and miniseries about the American Revolution
