= To Save Her Soul =

1909 film directed by D. W. Griffith

- Directed by: D. W. Griffith
- Written by: D. W. Griffith
- Starring: Arthur V. Johnson; Mary Pickford
- Cinematography: G. W. Bitzer; Arthur Marvin
- Distributed by: Biograph Company
- Release date: December 27, 1909
- Running time: 11 minutes
- Country: United States
- Language: Silent (English intertitles)

To Save Her Soul is a 1909 American short silent drama film directed by D. W. Griffith and starring Mary Pickford. The film was shot in Fort Lee, New Jersey, where many early film studios in America's first motion picture industry were based at the start of the 20th century.

== Plot ==
Agnes, a singer found in a small country church, is lured to the big city where she finds fame. A member of the clergy, from the church where she was found, goes to the city to hear her sing. He sees that she is being tempted by sin and threatens to kill her if she does not return to his church. This causes her to reevaluate her life and she eventually does return to her small town.

== Cast ==
- Arthur V. Johnson as Paul Redmond
- Mary Pickford as Agnes Hailey
- W. Chrystie Miller as Church Organist
- George Nichols as Manager
- Kate Bruce as Housekeeper
- Linda Arvidson in audience
- William Beaudine
- Charles Craig as Bumpkin
- Frank Evans as Stage Manager
- Robert Harron as Stagehand / Usher
- Ruth Hart at party
- James Kirkwood backstage at debut / at party
- Henry Lehrman in audience
- Jeanie MacPherson in audience
- Owen Moore at party
- Jack Pickford as Stagehand
- Lottie Pickford
- Billy Quirk
- Gertrude Robinson in audience
- Paul Scardon in audience
- Mack Sennett backstage at debut
- Blanche Sweet backstage at debut / at party
- Dorothy West at party

== See also ==
- D. W. Griffith filmography
- Mary Pickford filmography
- Blanche Sweet filmography
