= The Two Brothers (film) =

1910 film directed by D. W. Griffith

- Directed by: D. W. Griffith
- Written by: Eleanor Hicks
- Starring: Arthur V. Johnson
- Cinematography: G. W. Bitzer; Arthur Marvin
- Distributed by: American Mutoscope and Biograph Company
- Release date: April 4, 1910
- Running time: 17 minutes (16 frame/s)
- Country: United States
- Language: Silent (English intertitles)

The Two Brothers is a 1910 American silent short Western film directed by D. W. Griffith.

== Cast ==
- Arthur V. Johnson as Jose
- Dell Henderson as Manuel
- Kate Bruce as The Mother
- Marion Leonard as Red Rose
- Charles West as A Suitor / A Mexican
- Henry B. Walthall as Pedro
- W. Chrystie Miller as Priest
- Art Acord
- Linda Arvidson as Mexican
- Florence Barker as Mexican
- Gertrude Claire as Mexican
- Hoot Gibson
- George Nichols
- Anthony O'Sullivan as Mexican
- Alfred Paget as Mexican
- Mary Pickford as Mexican
- Billy Quirk as Mexican
- Mack Sennett as One of Pedro's Men
- Dorothy West as Mexican

== See also ==
- List of American films of 1910
