= The Red Man's View =

1909 film directed by D. W. Griffith

- Play film; runtime 00:14:35.
- Directed by: D. W. Griffith
- Written by: Frank E. Woods
- Starring: Owen Moore; James Kirkwood
- Cinematography: G. W. Bitzer
- Release date: December 9, 1909
- Running time: 14-15 minutes (1 reel, 971 feet)
- Country: United States
- Languages: Silent; English intertitles

The Red Man's View (also cited The Redman's View) is a 1909 American short silent Western film directed by D. W. Griffith and shot in New York state. Prints of the film exist in the film archives of the Museum of Modern Art and the Library of Congress. According to the New York Dramatic Mirror, the film is about "the helpless Indian race as it has been forced to recede before the advancing white, and as such is full of poetic sentiment". In his 2003 publication The Invention of the Western Film: A Cultural History of the Genre's First Half Century, film historian Scott Simon observes that "the film's title works out to mean 'The Red Man's Point of View', and for all the film's difficulty in making drama from a long, passive march, there's nothing like The Red Man's View in Hollywood until John Ford's Cheyenne Autumn more than fifty years later".

A remake starring Daniel Baldwin, Saginaw Grant, Booboo Stewart, Elaine Miles, Michael Spears, and Crystal Lightning was scheduled to be released in 2017.

== Cast ==
- Owen Moore as Silver Eagle
- James Kirkwood as Silver Eagle's Father, the Tribal Spokesman
- Kate Bruce as Indian
- Charles Craig as Conqueror
- Frank Evans as Conqueror
- Edith Haldeman as Indian
- Ruth Hart as Indian
- Arthur V. Johnson as Conqueror
- Henry Lehrman as Conqueror
- W. Chrystie Miller as Indian
- George Nichols as Conqueror
- Anthony O'Sullivan as Conqueror
- Alfred Paget
- Lottie Pickford as Minnewanna
- Billy Quirk as Conqueror
- Mack Sennett as Conqueror
- Charles West as Conqueror
- Dorothy West as Indian

== See also ==
- List of American films of 1909
- 1909 in film
- D. W. Griffith filmography
