= The Day After (1909 film) =

1909 film

- Directed by: D. W. Griffith
- Written by: Mary Pickford
- Starring: Blanche Sweet
- Distributed by: Biograph Company
- Release date: December 30, 1909
- Country: United States
- Language: Silent (English intertitles)

The Day After is a 1909 American short silent drama film directed by D. W. Griffith and Frank Powell, and starring Blanche Sweet. A print of the film survives in the film archive of the Library of Congress.

== Plot ==
The Day After (1909)

Mr. and Mrs. Hilton decided to give a big New Year's Eve party. They both agree to control their drinking, but as the guests arrive and the party continues, both get drunk. The next day, Mr. Hilton, feeling guilty for being weak, fears to confront his wife, until he finds out she was guilty as well.

== Cast ==
- Arthur V. Johnson as Mr. Hilton
- Blanche Sweet as The New Year
- Marion Leonard as Mrs. Hilton
- George Nichols as A Friend
- Linda Arvidson as Servant
- Frank Evans as Party Guest
- James Kirkwood as Party Guest
- Henry Lehrman as Party Guest
- Jeanie MacPherson as Party Guest
- W. Chrystie Miller as The Old Year
- Anthony O'Sullivan as Party Guest
- Gertrude Robinson as Party Guest
- Paul Scardon as Party Guest (unconfirmed)
- Mack Sennett as Party Guest
- Henry B. Walthall as Party Guest
- Dorothy West as Party Guest

== See also ==
- List of American films of 1909
