= The Feud and the Turkey =

1908 film directed by D. W. Griffith

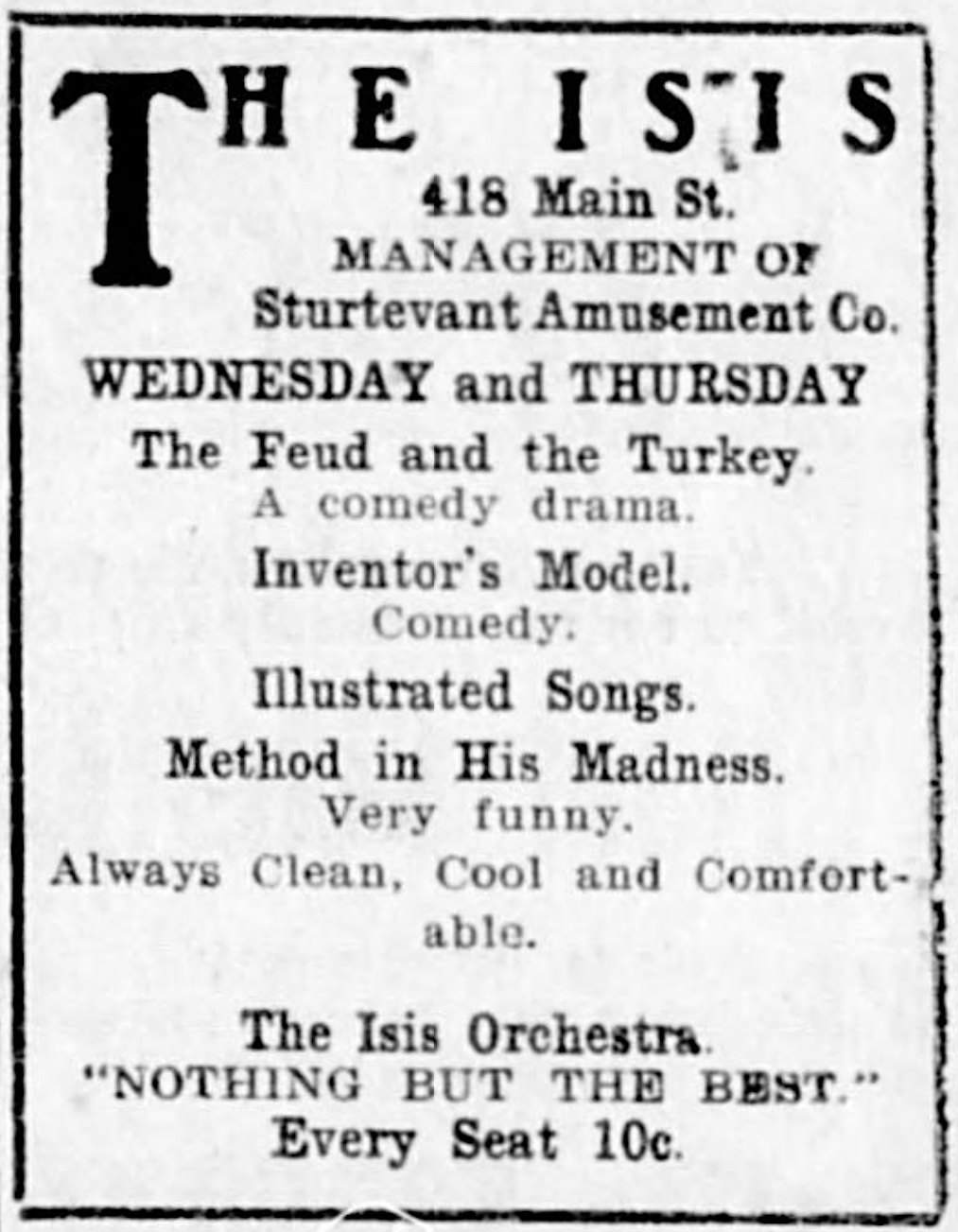
- Contemporary advertisement
- Directed by: D. W. Griffith
- Written by: D. W. Griffith
- Starring: Harry Solter
- Cinematography: G. W. Bitzer; Arthur Marvin
- Release date: December 8, 1908
- Running time: 15 minutes (one reel)
- Country: United States
- Language: Silent

The Feud and the Turkey is a 1908 American silent short drama film directed by D. W. Griffith.

== Cast ==
- Harry Solter as Mr. Caufield
- Linda Arvidson as Mrs. Caufield
- Arthur V. Johnson as Colonel Wilkinson
- Robert Harron as George Wilkinson
- George Gebhardt as Bobby Wilkinson as an Adult
- Marion Leonard as Nellie Caufield as an Adult
- Gertrude Robinson as Nellie Caufield as a Child
- Florence Lawrence as Nellie Caufield's Sister
- Clara T. Bracy
- Edward Dillon
- Charles Inslee as Uncle Daniel
- Violet Mersereau
- Herbert Miles
- Mack Sennett as A Member of the Wilkinson Clan
