= Pippa Passes (film) =

1909 film by D. W. Griffith

- Directed by: D. W. Griffith
- Based on: poem Pippa Passes by Robert Browning
- Produced by: Biograph Company
- Cinematography: G. W. Bitzer; Arthur Marvin
- Distributed by: Biograph Company; General Film Company (re-release)
- Release date: October 4, 1909
- Running time: 1 reel
- Country: USA
- Language: Silent..English titles

Pippa Passes; or, The Song of Conscience is a 1909 silent short directed D. W. Griffith. It was produced and distributed by the Biograph Company. It is based on a play Pippa Passes by Robert Browning.

It is preserved from a paper print.

== New York Times milestone ==
On October 10, 1909 – six days after its release – Pippa Passes became the first motion picture ever reviewed by The New York Times.

== Cast ==
- Gertrude Robinson – Pippa
- George Nichols – Pippa's Husband
- Arthur V. Johnson – Luca
- Marion Leonard – Ottima
- Owen Moore – Sibald

continuing cast

- Linda Arvidson – Greek Model
- Clara T. Bracy –
- Adele DeGarde –
- James Kirkwood – In Bar
- Anthony O'Sullivan – In Studio
- Mary Pickford – Girl in Crowd
- Billy Quirk – In Studio
- Mack Sennett – In Studio
- Henry B. Walthall –

== Bibliography ==
=== References ===
- AFI Catalog of Feature Films – The First 100 Years, 1893–1993.
1. Pippa Passes; or, The Song of Conscience at the AFI Catalog of Feature Films (AFI Film ID 37157). Retrieved 25 September 2015.
- Bennett, Carl. "Silent Era" – "Progressive Silent Film List:" Pippa Passes". Carl Bennett and the Silent Era Company. OCLC 47081708, 1147377061, 1141447659.
- Griffith, Mrs. David Wark (née Linda Arvidson Johnson; 1884–1949), ed. (1925). Chapter 17: "Pippa Passes Filmed". When the Movies Were Young. New York: E.P. Dutton & Company. p. 129 – via Internet Archive (Media History Digital Library; Niles Essanay Silent Film Museum; Kirkland Town Library; David Shepard). LCCN 25-19076; OCLC 1467813 (all editions).
Note: The author, Linda Arvidson, who played a Greek model in the 1909 film, Pippa Passes, was, from 1906 to 1936, married to the director, David Wark Griffith (1875–1948).
- Guiliano, Edward; Keenan, Richard C. (1976). "Browning Without Words: D.W. Griffith and the Filming of Pippa Passes". Browning Institute Studies. 4. Cambridge University Press: 125–159. ISSN 0092-4725; JSTOR 25057629.
- New York Times (The). ISSN 0362-4331.
1. "Browning Now Given in Moving Pictures — Pippa Passes Latest Play Without Words to Be Seen in the Nickelodeons — The Classics Drawn Upon — Even Biblical Stories Portrayed for Critical Audiences – Improvement Due to Board of Censors". Vol. 59, no. 18887. October 10, 1909. p. 1 (column 1, top).
  1. Via Newspapers.com.
  2. Via NYTimes blog.
  3. Via TimesMachine.
  4. Via TimesMachine permalink.
  5. Pdf via TimesMachine.
  6. Pdf via TimesMachine (PDF).
