= Jane Quirk =

Musician and performer (c. 1878–1949)

Jane Quirk (c. 1878 – 13 July 1949) was a cornetist, vaudeville performer, and orchestra conductor.

== Early life ==
Jane Quirk was born Patsy Jane Holcomb, around 1878 in Keytesville, Missouri, the daughter of Ethan Holcomb and Martha Price. She was raised in Cedar Rapids, Iowa, where from a young age she performed as a singer, dancer and cornetist, along with her brother and sister at social occasions and church events. During her teens she lost most of her family, with her sister, brother and mother dying within a five year period. Jane's father died in 1901.

== Life and career ==
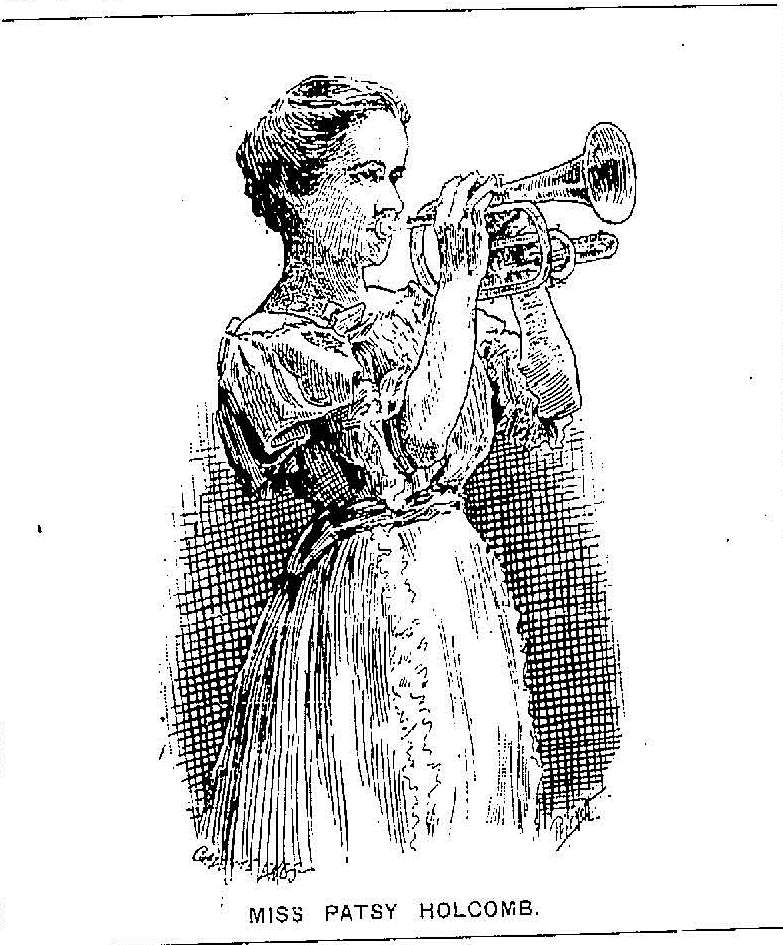
Patsy Jane Holcomb playing the cornet

After the death of her mother in 1898, Jane went on the road performing as a cornet player for traveling orchestras, including the Kirchner's Famous Lady Orchestra, and the Boston Ladies' Symphony Orchestra. In 1903 Jane married fellow performer Billy Quirk in New York. Jane and her husband bred and showed champion French bulldogs. In 1907 Jane appeared on Broadway in "The Top O' Th' World," a musical extravaganza in which Jane and five other dancers appeared in a "collie ballet," dancing with six collie dogs.

=== As Jane Quirk ===
Around 1909, Jane stopped going by "Patsy" and became professionally known as Jane Quirk. She kept working and traveling, appearing in various plays, and eventually moved to conducting the orchestra for musical plays, including Jesse Lasky productions The Trained Nurses in 1912, and Red Heads in 1913. During the next few years, Jane continued to play the cornet, and was the conductor or musical director for various productions. In 1916 Jane appeared in a stage act with her husband Billy Quirk.

=== As Jane Frayne ===
Around 1921 (possibly after her divorce from husband Billy Quirk), Jane's professional name became "Jane Frayne". In 1924 she was the director of a jazz band, the "Knights of Harmony", following which she presented "Jane Frayne's Toyland" with the Shand family.

== Later life ==
According to Billy Quirk's death certificate, the couple were divorced at the time of his death in 1926. In 1928, Jane married musician William Greene, and retired from the stage in 1930. Jane and William settled in Battle Creek, Michigan, where she ran a tea-room for a time, and then for several years worked for Kellogg's. Jane died on 13 July 1949 after a long illness.
