= Edith Haldeman =

American actress

Edith Haldeman (April 17, 1905 – October 1984) was an American child actress of the early silent film era. She appeared in 36 films between 1909 and 1916.

She appeared in Native American films such as A Mohawk's Way (1910), and Red Man's View (1909), by D.W. Griffith. She starred along Claire McDowell in His Trust (1911).

== Filmography ==
- The Memory Mill (1916) as Mrs. Wright
- A Poor Relation (1915) as Patch
- The Wop (1913) as Rosie, Luigi's Daughter
- Loneliness and Love (1913) as The Lonely Little Girl
- Damages in Full (1913) as Little Stella Ashton
- The Old Folks' Christmas (1912) as The Dobson Daughter
- The World Weary Man (1912) as The Little Child
- Officer One Seven Four (1912) as Officer 174's Little Daughter
- King the Detective and the Smugglers (1912) as The Girl's Sister
- The Cruel Stepmother (1912) as The Daughter
- A Child's Remorse (1912) as Among Children
- Let No Man Put Asunder (1912) as Doris Stevens - John's Daughter
- The Lure of the Picture (1912) as Antonio's Little Daughter
- Billy's Stratagem (1912) as A Settler
- After Many Years (1912) as Little Ethel Chilton
- The Baby and the Stork (1912) as The Workman's Daughter
- The Doll (1911) as The Child (as Edith Hollinand)
- By Registered Mail (1911) as Ethel - Grantley's Little Daughter
- A Lonely Little Girl (1911) as The Little Girl
- His Trust: The Faithful Devotion and Self-Sacrifice of an Old Negro Servant (1911) as The Fraziers' Child
- The Bolted Door (1911) as Edith - The Child
- The Two Paths (1911) as One of the Children
- Two Little Waifs (1910) as One of the Waifs
- The Iconoclast (1910) as The Worker's Daughter
- Examination Day at School (1910) as Student
- In Life's Cycle (1910) as Clara's Child
- A Mohawk's Way (1910) as Indian Child
- Little Angels of Luck (1910) as Little Ruth Rose
- The Final Settlement (1910) as The Child
- The Cloister's Touch (1910) as The Child
- The Last Deal (1910) as The Child
- The Rocky Road (1910) as The Daughter - as a Child
- A Corner in Wheat (1909) as Woman in Store
- The Red Man's View (1909) as Indian
- The Death Disc: A Story of the Cromwellian Period (1909) as The Catholic's Child
- The Open Gate (1909) as Hetty's Niece - Mary - as a Child
- The Little Teacher (1909) as Student
- Wanted, a Child (1909) as Child
- Leather Stocking (1909) as A Child
- A Fair Exchange (1909) as The Child
