= A Mohawk's Way =

1910 short film by D. W. Griffith

- Directed by: D. W. Griffith
- Written by: Stanner E.V. Taylor
- Based on: novel by James Fenimore Cooper
- Cinematography: G. W. Bitzer
- Production company: Biograph Company
- Distributed by: Biograph Company; Unicorn Film Service Corporation (1916 reissue)
- Release date: September 12, 1910 (U.S.)
- Running time: 17 minutes
- Country: United States
- Language: Silent (English intertitles)

A Mohawk's Way, also known as The Mohawk's Treasure, is a 1910 short silent black-and-white drama film directed by D. W. Griffith, written by Stanner E.V. Taylor, and based on a novel by James Fenimore Cooper, with cinematography by G. W. Bitzer. It stars Dorothy Davenport and Jeanie MacPherson.

The film portrays American cultural precepts about bloodthirsty savage American Indians, and assails the cruelty of the white man.

== Plot ==
A Mohawk warrior, driven by both gratitude and a sense of justice, seeks help for his ailing child. After the tribe's medicine man fails to cure the baby, the warrior appeals to Dr. Van Brum, a white physician known for his cruelty. Van Brum refuses and assaults the warrior. Overhearing the plea, the doctor's wife secretly visits the tribe and provides medicine, which quickly cures the child. The grateful tribe views the medicine bottle as a powerful charm, and the squaw wears it as a talisman.

Temporary peace follows, but tension reignites when Van Brum insults the squaw near the river. She brandishes the bottle for protection, and when he mocks her, she threatens him with a dagger. The tribe, learning of the incident, pursues Van Brum, who flees with his wife. The Mohawk intercept the couple, and Van Brum is killed. His wife is taken captive but is saved by the squaw, who invokes the tribe's reverence for the medicine bottle. The warriors relent, and the squaw and her husband escort the woman to safety, ferrying her across the river to a British camp.

== Cast ==
- George Nichols as Doctor Van Brum
- Claire McDowell as Indian Mother
- Edith Haldeman as Indian Child
- Francis J. Grandon as Indian Medicine Man
- Charles Arling
- William J. Butler as Servant
- Dorothy Davenport as Indian
- Adele DeGarde
- Edward Dillon as Friend
- John T. Dillon as Trapper
- Frank Evans as Trapper
- Guy Hedlund as Indian
- Henry Lehrman as Patient
- Jeanie MacPherson as Indian
- Charles Hill Mailes as Indian
- Anthony O'Sullivan as Trapper
- Alfred Paget as Indian
- Gertrude Robinson as Indian
- W. C. Robinson as Indian
- Mack Sennett
