= Salomy Jane (1923 film) =

1923 American silent Western film by George Melford

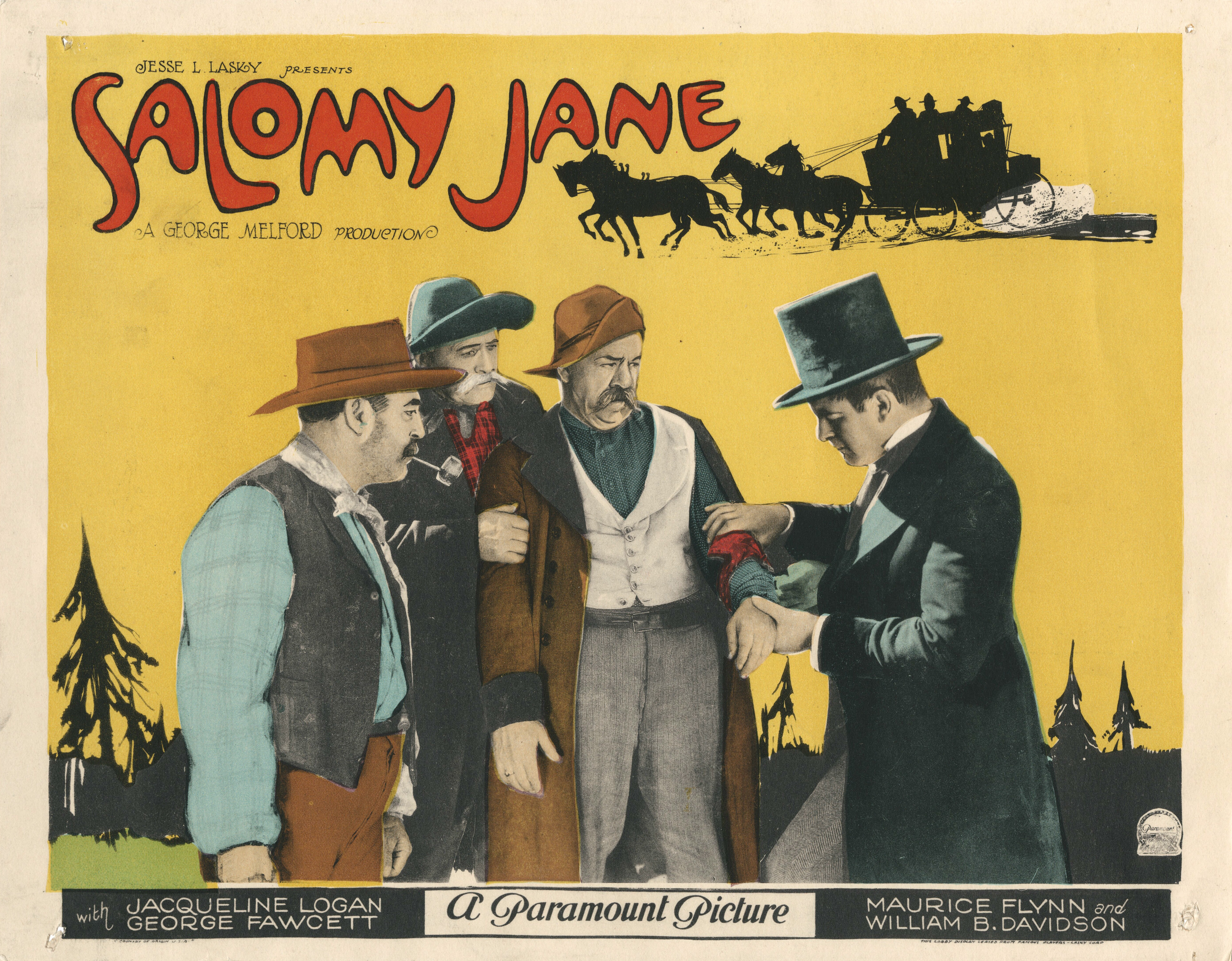
- Theatrical release poster
- Directed by: George Melford
- Screenplay by: Paul Armstrong; Bret Harte; Waldemar Young
- Produced by: Jesse L. Lasky
- Starring: Jacqueline Logan; George Fawcett; Maurice 'Lefty' Flynn; William B. Davidson; Charles Stanton Ogle; Billy Quirk; G. Raymond Nye
- Cinematography: Charles G. Clarke
- Production company: Famous Players–Lasky Corporation
- Distributed by: Paramount Pictures
- Release date: August 26, 1923
- Running time: 70 minutes
- Country: United States
- Language: Silent (English intertitles)

Salomy Jane is a lost 1923 American silent Western film directed by George Melford, and written by Paul Armstrong, Bret Harte, and Waldemar Young. The film stars Jacqueline Logan, George Fawcett, Maurice "Lefty" Flynn, William B. Davidson, Charles Stanton Ogle, Billy Quirk, and G. Raymond Nye. The film was released on August 26, 1923, by Paramount Pictures. It is a remake of the 1914 film of the same name.

== Cast ==
- Jacqueline Logan as Salomy Jane
- George Fawcett as Yuba Bill
- Maurice Bennett Flynn as The Man
- William B. Davidson as Gambler
- Charles Stanton Ogle as Madison Clay
- Billy Quirk as Colonel Starbottle
- G. Raymond Nye as Red Pete
- Louise Dresser as Mrs. Pete
- James Neill as Larabee
- Thomas Carrigan as Rufe Waters
- Clarence Burton as Baldwin
- Barbara Brower as Mary Ann
- Milton Ross as Steve Low

== Production ==
Salomy Jane was shot on location at Boulder Creek, California. Additional buildings were constructed of logs to expand an existing mining settlement, and a road was created by trampling the ground with horses.
