= Frank E. Woods =

American screenwriter (1860–1939)

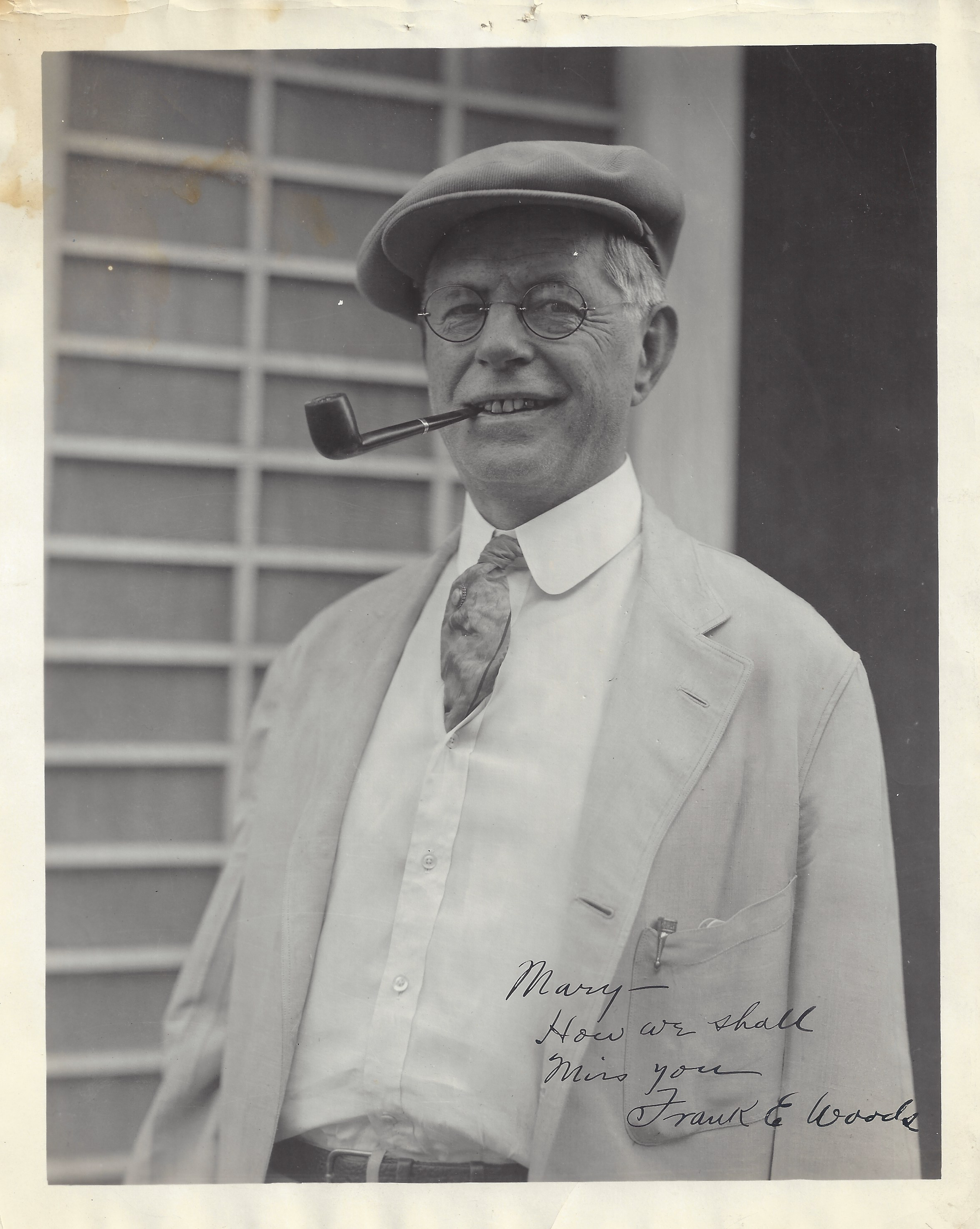
- Woods in 1922
- Born: 1860; Linesville, Pennsylvania, U.S.
- Died: May 1, 1939 (aged 78–79); Los Angeles, California, U.S.
- Occupation: Screenwriter
- Years active: 1908–1925
- Spouse: Ella Woods
- Relatives: Lotta Woods (sister-in-law)

Frank E. Woods (1860 – May 1, 1939) was an American screenwriter of the silent era. He wrote for 90 films from 1908 to 1925. He first became a writer with the Biograph Company. Woods was also a pioneering film reviewer. As a writer, his contributions to film criticism are discussed in the 2009 documentary, For the Love of Movies: The Story of American Film Criticism. Woods worked for the Kinemacolor Company of America, directing at their Hollywood studios and writing the script for the unreleased The Clansman (1911). He was also known for his screenplay collaborations with D. W. Griffith, including the co-scripting of The Birth of a Nation. He later publicly expressed regret for his involvement with the film. He is interred in the Hollywood Forever Cemetery in Hollywood, CA.

Woods was one of the 36 founders of the Academy of Motion Picture Arts and Sciences.

== Selected filmography ==
- After Many Years (1908)
- Edgar Allen Poe (1909)
- Jones and His New Neighbors (1909)
- Mrs. Jones Entertains (1909)
- Mr. Jones Has a Card Party (1909)
- Resurrection (1909)
- The Sealed Room (1909)
- The Hessian Renegades (1909)
- Fools of Fate (1909)
- The Death Disc: A Story of the Cromwellian Period (1909)
- The Red Man's View (1909)
- A Corner in Wheat (1909)
- In Little Italy (1909)
- Nursing a Viper (1909)
- Priscilla's April Fool Joke (1911)
- Priscilla and the Umbrella (1911)
- The Country Lovers (1911)
- The White Rose of the Wilds (1911)
- The Left-Handed Man (1913)
- In Diplomatic Circles (1913)
- The Mirror (1913)
- The Stopped Clock (1913)
- Strongheart (1914)
- Judith of Bethulia (1914)
- Man's Enemy (1914)
- The Birth of a Nation (1915)
- A Man’s Prerogative (1915)
- The Absentee (1915)
- The Little School Ma'am (1916)
- Intolerance (1916)
- The Children Pay (1916)
- Betsy's Burglar (1917)
- A Woman's Awakening (1917)
- Richard the Lion-Hearted (1923)
- What Shall I Do? (1924)
- Chalk Marks (1924)
- Beauty and the Bad Man (1925)
- Let Women Alone (1925)
