= What the Daisy Said =

1910 film directed by D. W. Griffith

- Directed by: D. W. Griffith
- Written by: Stanner E.V. Taylor
- Starring: Clara T. Bracy
- Cinematography: G. W. Bitzer
- Distributed by: Biograph Company
- Release date: July 11, 1910
- Running time: 12 minutes
- Country: United States
- Language: Silent with English intertitles

What the Daisy Said is a one-reel film (about 12 minutes) made by D. W. Griffith for Biograph in 1910.

== Plot ==
Sisters Martha and Milly begin their day in a field of daisies. Milly plucks petals to divine whether he loves me... he loves me not, and the two part ways. Martha encounters a lanky farmhand who proposes they become sweethearts, but she declines and heads to town for a palm reading. A mustachioed gypsy fortuneteller tells her fortune, and she agrees to meet him at a waterfall before returning home.

Martha revisits the waterfall, and the gypsy embraces her. Martha convinces Milly to have her fortune told, but loses track of her sister in town. The gypsy, now alone with Milly, leads her to the waterfall and kisses her, which Martha later witnesses. Martha withdraws to the orchard.

Meanwhile, the sisters' father discovers Milly with the gypsy and, enraged, confronts him. In the struggle, the gypsy strikes the father and flees. A search party forms as the father recovers. Martha, unaware of the assault, hides the gypsy in a barrel. When the search party passes, he departs abruptly. It later confronts him at the fortuneteller's wagon and forces him to leave town.

Martha finds comfort with the farmhand she earlier rejected. The film ends as Milly strolls arm-in-arm with a new suitor through the daisy field.

== Cast ==
- Clara T. Bracy as a gypsy (uncredited)
- Kate Bruce as the spinster (uncredited)
- Verner Clarges as the father (uncredited)
- John T. Dillon as a farmhand (uncredited)
- Frank Evans as a farmhand (uncredited)
- Francis J. Grandon as a farmer (uncredited)
- Joseph Graybill as the gypsy (uncredited)
- Owen Moore (uncredited)
- George Nichols (uncredited)
- Anthony O'Sullivan as a gypsy/a farmhand (uncredited)
- Alfred Paget as a farmhand (uncredited)
- Mary Pickford as Martha (uncredited)
- Gertrude Robinson as Milly (uncredited)
- Mack Sennett (uncredited)
- Charles West as a farmer (uncredited)

== See also ==
- List of American films of 1910
- 1910 in film
