= The Under-Sheriff =

1914 film

- Directed by: George Nichols
- Starring: Fatty Arbuckle
- Release date: January 8, 1914
- Country: United States
- Languages: Silent; English intertitles

The Under-Sheriff is a 1914 American short comedy film featuring Fatty Arbuckle as a deputy who flirts with his boss's wife and has "antics with a ponderous animated ball".

== Cast ==
- Roscoe "Fatty" Arbuckle
- Alice Davenport
- Minta Durfee
- George Nichols

== See also ==
- List of American films of 1914
- Fatty Arbuckle filmography
