= Gertrude Robinson =

American actress

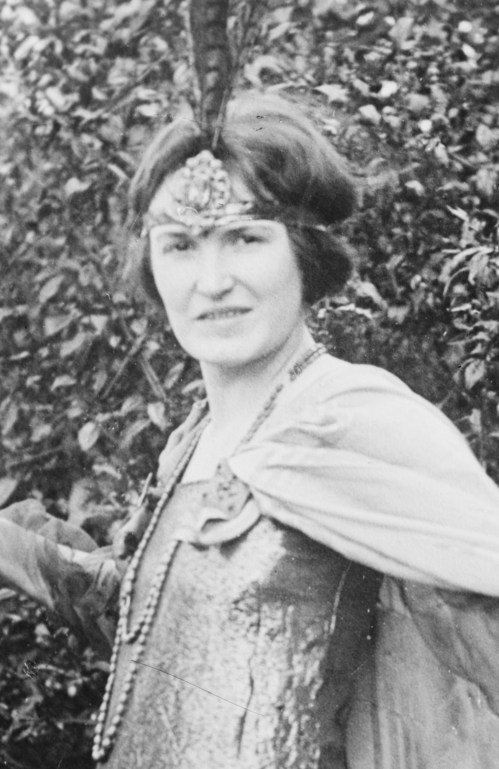
- Robinson in 1925
- Born: October 7, 1890; New York City, U.S.
- Died: March 19, 1962 (aged 71); Hollywood, California, U.S.
- Occupation: Actress
- Years active: 1908–1925
- Spouses: Walter Robinson; James Kirkwood (m. 1916; div. 1923)
- Children: 1

Gertrude Robinson (October 7, 1890 – March 19, 1962) was an American actress of the silent era.

== Biography ==
She appeared in 164 films between 1908 and 1925. She was born in New York City and died in Hollywood, California. She was the first wife of James Kirkwood with whom she had a child. Her first husband was Walter Robinson.

== Partial filmography ==
- The Feud and the Turkey (1908)
- The Test of Friendship (1908)
- An Awful Moment (1908)
- One Touch of Nature (1909)
- The Fascinating Mrs. Francis (1909)
- Jones and the Lady Book Agent (1909)
- Those Awful Hats (1909)
- The Cord of Life (1909)
- The Girls and Daddy (1909)
- A Burglar's Mistake (1909)
- Two Memories (1909)
- The Sealed Room (1909)
- The Hessian Renegades (1909)
- Pippa Passes (1909)
- The Death Disc: A Story of the Cromwellian Period (1909)
- In Little Italy (1909)
- To Save Her Soul (1909)
- The Day After (1909)
- Getting Even (1909)
- In Old Kentucky (1909)
- His Lost Love (1909)
- The Gibson Goddess (1909)
- Nursing a Viper (1909)
- The Englishman and the Girl (1910)
- What the Daisy Said (1910)
- A Flash of Light (1910)
- A Mohawk's Way (1910) as Indian
- Classmates (1914)
- Judith of Bethulia (1914)
- Strongheart (1914)
- May Blossom (1915)
- The Arab (1915)
- A Woman of Impulse (1918)
- Milestones (1920)
- On Thin Ice (1925)
