= Lottie Pickford =

Canadian-American actress (1893–1936)

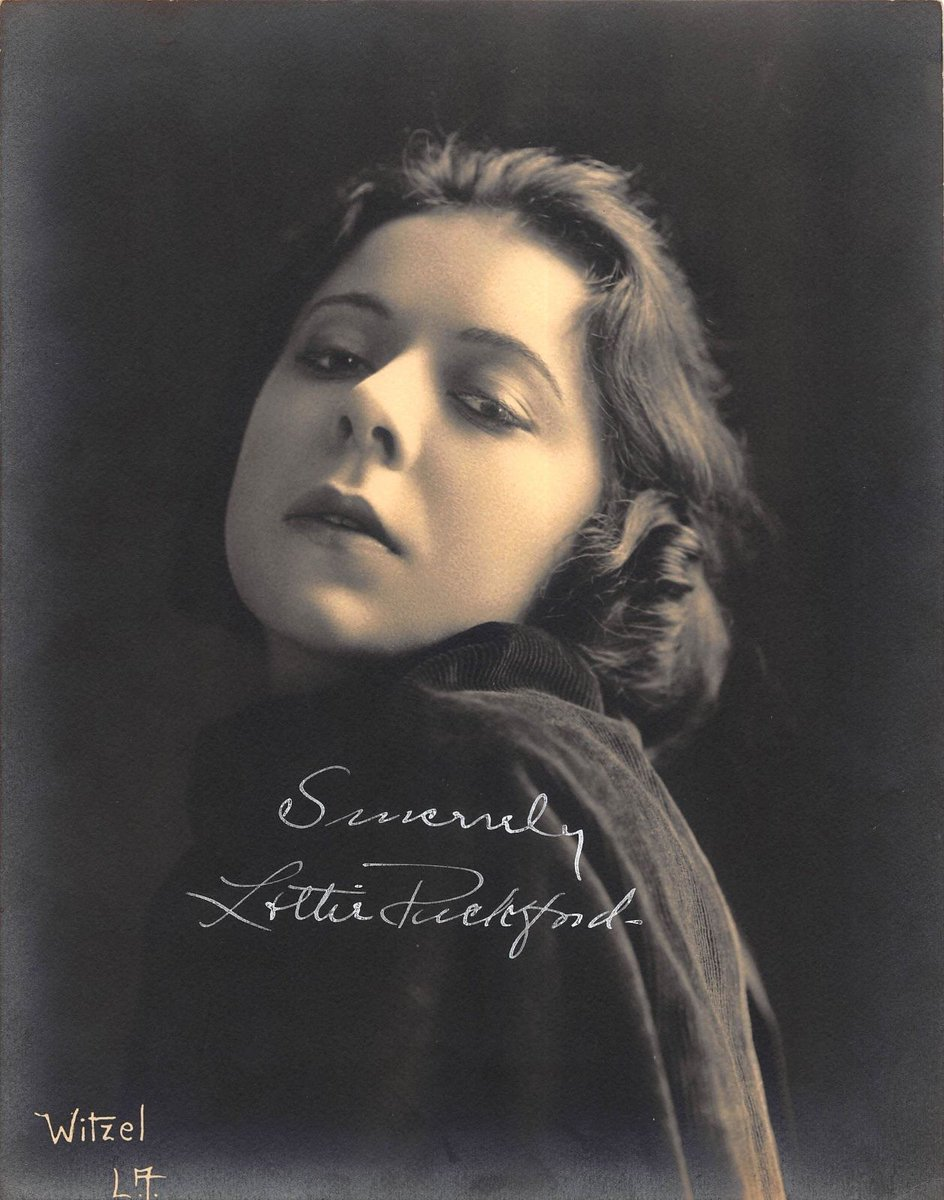
- Pickford, c. 1920
- Born: Charlotte Smith; June 9, 1893; Toronto, Ontario, Canada
- Died: December 9, 1936 (aged 43); Los Angeles, California, U.S.
- Resting place: Forest Lawn Memorial Park, Glendale
- Other names: Lottie Pickford Forrest
- Occupation: Actress
- Years active: 1900–1925
- Spouses: Alfred Rupp (m. 1915; div. 1920) Allan Forrest (m. 1922; div. 1927) Russel O. Gillard (m. 1929; div. 1933) John William Lock (m. 1933)
- Children: 1
- Mother: John Charles Smith and Charlotte Hennessy
- Relatives: Mary Pickford (sister); Jack Pickford (brother)

Charlotte Smith (June 9, 1893 – December 9, 1936), known professionally as Lottie Pickford, was a Canadian-American silent film actress and socialite. She was the younger sister of fellow actress Mary Pickford and elder sister of actor Jack Pickford.

One of her best known roles was in The Diamond from the Sky directed by William Desmond Taylor in 1915. Pickford's career often is overshadowed by that of her siblings and though she was a notable figure in the 1920s, her films and role in the Pickford acting family largely are forgotten.

== Early years ==
Born to John Charles Smith and Charlotte Hennessy, Lottie Pickford was named for her mother. She was the middle child, born a year and two months after her sister Gladys Smith and three years before her brother John Charles Smith, who was known as Jack. She quickly became her father's favorite, much to her sister's annoyance. After mistakenly believing she was a boy when first born, her father lovingly gave her the boyish nickname Chuckie. Their father, John Charles Smith, died in 1898 and eldest sibling Gladys took on responsibilities. Lottie and Jack became extremely close, banding together against Gladys, whom they saw as strict. Lottie idolized her brother Jack, and they remained close throughout their lifetimes. Despite her sometimes tense relationship with her sister, Lottie was protective of her, and once jumped on D. W. Griffith to defend her sister during a heated argument with the director.

In need of extra income, the family began to act. On January 8, 1900, Gladys and Lottie appeared in The Silver King. Lottie either was offered a lesser sum than her sister or was part of a packaged deal. The family eventually moved to New York City where they all acted in various productions, sometimes together, sometimes not. At one point, Lottie and Gladys had to travel on their own for one production. Of the family, Gladys was the breakout star. Her family members usually were attached to her as a contractual stipulation. After she started in films, Gladys took the name Mary Pickford. Lottie and Jack also took the surname Pickford in their acting careers. Mary was influential in getting her siblings on the payroll after she started acting in films.

== Film career ==
In 1907, Gladys adopted the stage name Mary Pickford from her middle name and the last name of her maternal grandmother, at the suggestion of Broadway producer David Belasco. The rest of the family adopted the Pickford name by the time they began appearing in films. Mary signed with D.W. Griffith's Biograph Company in 1909 and secured work for her siblings.

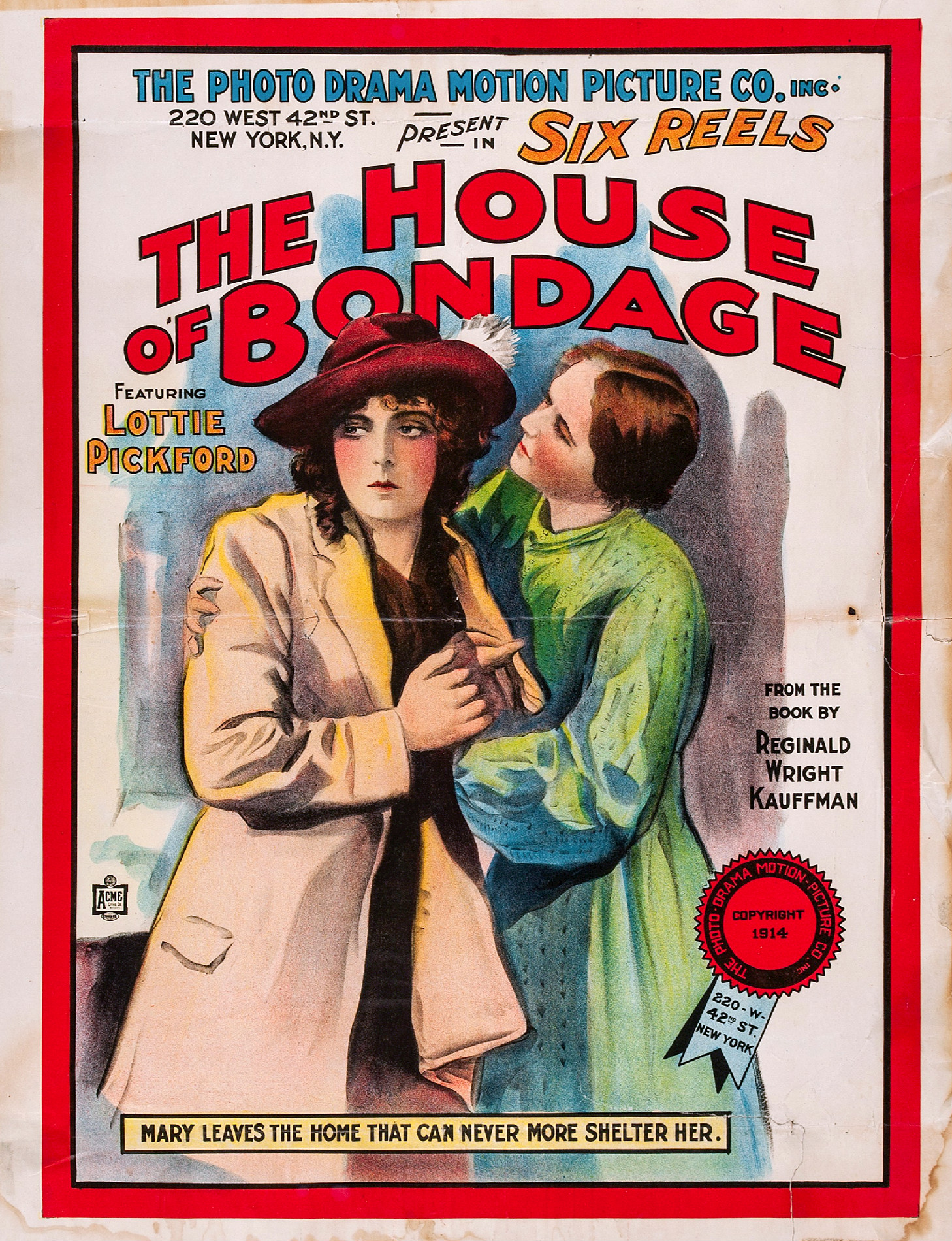
The House of Bondage (1914) poster

Between 1909 and 1910, Mary made eighty shorts, Jack made twenty-eight, and Lottie made twenty-five. Of the three Pickfords, Lottie's talents were considered the weakest. Actress Linda Arvidson said Mary had claimed her sister was not pretty enough for films, and had done her best to keep her away from Biograph. When the Biograph Company departed for California, Lottie Pickford and her mother were left behind. She would eventually join her sister in California.

Away from her elder sister, Pickford's first starring role came in 1914 in The House of Bondage. It was a vice film, with Pickford playing a prostitute, in stark contrast to her sister's image as "America's Sweetheart". The film did not receive good reviews, being considered too crude. In 1915, Pickford appeared in Fanchon, the Cricket, opposite both her siblings. It is the only film in which all three Pickford siblings appear. It was thought lost until rediscovered in the 20th century at the British Film Institute.

Pickford starred in The Diamond from the Sky serial (1915) although, to her humiliation, she was only given the role after Mary turned it down. A Photoplay article from around the time of the release declared her "Pickford the Second!" and compared her to her sister, albeit as a worthy sequel. The serial was jeopardized when she became pregnant. This incident put her on the unofficial Hollywood blacklist for a short time. Pickford performed in only five roles between 1915 and 1918, when she took a break from acting.

After divorcing her first husband, Pickford next starred in 1921's They Shall Pay which co-starred Allan Forrest, her future husband. Pickford again took several years' time off from acting before returning in a minor role in the 1924 film Dorothy Vernon of Haddon Hall. Her final role was opposite her brother-in-law Douglas Fairbanks Sr. in Don Q Son of Zorro in 1925. During her career, Pickford starred in eight features, and her brother starred in over 40 features.

== Personal life ==
Pickford was a socialite and partying was her first love. She and her brother Jack both struggled with alcoholism. Her parties were legendary and lasted until morning with plentiful drugs and alcohol and nudity. Pickford's maid recalled that when they heard Mary's car pulling in, Pickford and her friends would "Jump into their knickers!" Despite her reputation as a party girl, Pickford was considered to be down to earth, friendly, sweet, and unpretentious.

=== Marriages ===
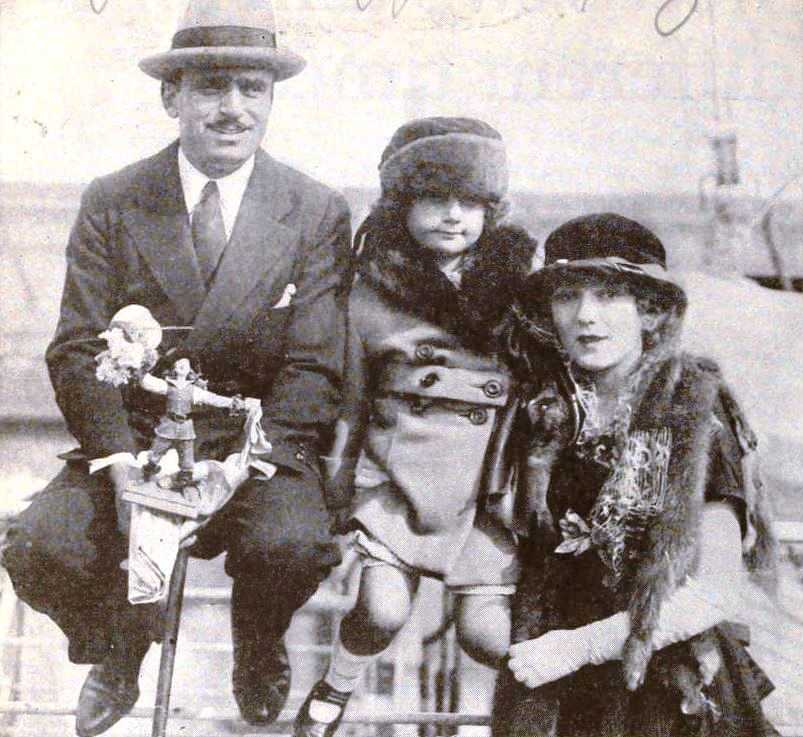
Fairbanks, Mary Pickford Rupp (daughter of Lottie Pickford) and Mary Pickford. December 1921 Photoplay, Page 80.

On an unknown date in 1915, before the release of The Diamond from the Sky, Pickford quietly married New York broker Alfred Rupp. The couple had a daughter in 1915, Mary Pickford Rupp (1915-1984), who later was renamed Gwynne Rupp. The couple separated in 1919 and divorced the following year. For unknown reasons, Pickford allowed her mother Charlotte to legally adopt her daughter, who was renamed Gwynne in 1920. Pickford did not comment to the press on the matter, other than to say she never would marry again. Gwynne lived with her grandmother until Charlotte, Sr.'s death in 1928. At that time, Gwynne's aunt, Mary Pickford, took custody of her. This arrangement lasted until Gwynne married radio announcer Hugh "Bud" Ernst in June 1939.

Lottie Pickford did marry again, to actor Allan Forrest, in January 1922. She obtained a divorce from Forrest in Paris in 1927. On July 22, 1929, she married Russel O. Gillard, an undertaker from Los Angeles. They divorced in February 1933 on charges of "extreme cruelty" by her husband. Later that year, Pickford married a Pittsburgh society man named John William Lock. They remained married until her early death in 1936.

== Death ==
On December 9, 1936, Pickford suffered a heart attack at the age of 43. She was said to have been in failing health for three years, related to alcohol abuse. She died at her home in Beverly Hills. Her funeral was held on December 13 at Wee Kirk o' the Heather Church in Glendale, California. She is buried in the Pickford family plot in Forest Lawn Cemetery.

== Filmography ==
Key
†	Denotes a lost or presumed lost film.

Short Subject
Year	Film	Role	Notes
1909	Two Memories †		
1909	The Faded Lilies		
1909	The Necklace		
1909	The Cardinal's Conspiracy	The Princess' Servant	Unconfirmed
1909	Tender Hearts	Nellie's Friend	
1909	The Slave	A Dancer	
1909	A Strange Meeting	At Party	
1909	The Better Way	Puritan	
1909	The Indian Runner's Romance	Indian	Unconfirmed
1909	The Little Darling		
1909	The Hessian Renegades		
1909	Getting Even	Party Guest	
1909	The Broken Locket		
1909	His Lost Love	At Wedding	
1909	What's Your Hurry?		
1909	The Light That Came		
1909	In the Window Recess †		
1909	Through the Breakers	At the Ball	
1909	The Red Man's View	Minnewanna	
1909	The Test	A Maid	Unconfirmed
1909	To Save Her Soul		
1910	The Woman from Mellon's	Young Woman	Unconfirmed
1910	The Newlyweds †		
1910	The Smoker		
1910	The Tenderfoot's Triumph †		
1910	A Knot in the Plot †		
1910	A Victim of Jealousy		
1910	Serious Sixteen		
1910	The Call to Arms		
1910	Unexpected Help		
1910	The Affair of an Egg		
1910	A Summer Idyll †		
1910	You Saved My Life †		
1910	The Oath and the Man †		
1910	Examination Day at School		
1910	A Gold Necklace	Nellie	
1910	The Broken Doll †	Townswoman	
1910	Two Little Waifs †		
1910	Simple Charity	In Hallway	
1910	A Plain Song †	Storemate	
1910	A Child's Stratagem †		
1910	Happy Jack, a Hero	At Party	
1910	The Golden Supper †	Flower Girl	
1910	His Sister-In-Law †	Eva	
1910	White Roses †	At Party	
1911	The Two Paths	At Party	
1911	The Italian Barber	At Ball	
1911	The Midnight Marauder	Mrs. Henry Blowhard	
1911	Help Wanted †	In Corridor	
1911	His Trust	Woman at Farewell	
1911	The Dream	Bess - the Typewriter	Uncredited
1911	Fate's Turning		
1911	A Wreath of Orange Blossoms †		
1911	Three Sisters †	At Dancing Academy	
1911	Sweet Memories	Young Lettie Terrell	
1911	The Lighthouse Keeper	Wedding Guest	Uncredited
1911	The Toss of a Coin		
1911	Who's Who †	Georgia	
1911	The Courting of Mary †		
1911	Love at Gloucester Port	Alice Newall	
1911	Little Red Riding Hood †		
1912	Love Finds the Way	Margaret Durand - Jack's Sweetheart	
1912	The Belle of New Orleans †		
1912	Rescued by Wireless	Grace Langton	Credited as Lottie Smith
1912	A Mardi Gras Mix-Up †	Paul's wife	
1912	The Pilgrimage †	Gretchen	
1912	A Beast at Bay	Unconfirmed role	
1912	Into the Jungle	Mary	
1912	The Girl Strikers †	Ann	
1912	Lena and the Geese		
1912	Love's Diary †	Kate Morgan - the Stenographer	
1912	A Child's Remorse †		
1913	When a Girl Loves †	Betty	
1913	For Old Time's Sake †		
1913	Granny †	Eileen - an Orphan	
1915	Curly		

Film
Year	Title	Role	Notes
1914	The House of Bondage †	Mary Denbigh	
1915	The Diamond from the Sky †	Esther Stanley, the Gypsy Heroine	
1915	Fanchon, the Cricket	Madelon	Incomplete film, 3 1/2 of 5 films survive
1916	The Reward of Patience †	Edith Penfield	
1917	On the Level †	Eleanore Duke	
1918	Mile-a-Minute Kendall †	Rosalynde d'Aubre	
1918	The Man from Funeral Range †	Dixie	
1921	They Shall Pay	Margaret Seldon	
1924	Dorothy Vernon of Haddon Hall	Jennie Faxton	Credited as Lottie Pickford Forrest
1925	Don Q, Son of Zorro	Lola	Credited as Lottie Pickford Forrest

== Footnotes ==
=== References ===
- Whitfield, Eileen (1997). Pickford, The Woman Who Made Hollywood. Lexington, Ky: Lexington : University Press of Kentucky. ISBN 0-8131-2045-4.
