= Billy Quirk =

American actor (1873–1926)

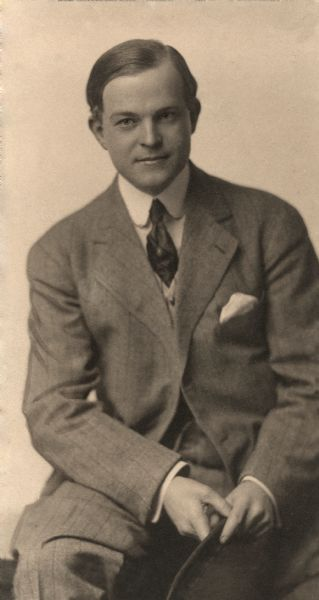
- Publicity portrait, 1912
- Born: William Andrew Quirk; March 27, 1873; Jersey City, New Jersey, U.S.
- Died: April 20, 1926 (aged 53); Los Angeles, California, U.S.
- Occupation: Actor
- Years active: 1909–1924
- Spouses: Jane Quirk (m.1903–div. after 1920) (Note: The United States Census of 1920 documents that the Quirks remained legally married in January that year, but Billy was living then in Manhattan in a boardinghouse. In his 1926 death certificate, however, he is documented as divorced. He and Patsy therefore divorced sometime between February 1920 and April 1926.)

William Andrew Quirk (March 27, 1873 – April 20, 1926) was an American stage and silent-film actor. He performed in more than 180 films between 1909 and 1924. Born in Jersey City, New Jersey, he died in Los Angeles, California. Gem Motion Picture Company produced a series of "Billy"-titled pictures starring Quirk.

== Partial filmography ==
- His Wife's Visitor (1909 short with Mary Pickford) - Harry Wright (credited as William A. Quirk)
- A Sound Sleeper (1909 short) - uncredited
- The Hessian Renegades (1909 short) - Hessian
- Pippa Passes (1909 short) - In Studio
- Nursing a Viper (1909 short) - Fleeing Aristocrat
- The Red Man's View (1909 short) - Conqueror (uncredited)
- In Little Italy (1909 short) - At the Ball
- To Save Her Soul (1909 short)
- Choosing a Husband (1909 short) - 2nd Bachelor
- The Woman from Mellon's (1910 short) - Harry Townsend
- The Two Brothers (1910 short) - Mexican
- May and December (1910 short with Mary Pickford) - June
- The Lucky Toothache (1910 short)
- How Rastus Gets His Turkey (1910 short) - Rastus
- Billy in Trouble (1911 short) - Billy
- The Burglar's Fee (1911 short) - The Burglar
- Hearts, Hunger, Happiness (1911 short) - Billy
- Father Against His Will (1911 short) - Harry
- Algie the Miner (1912 short) - Algie Allmore
- Fra Diavolo (1912 short directed by Alice Guy) - Fra Diavolo
- The Equine Spy (1912 short) - colored servant (in blackface)
- The Maverick (1912 short) - Billy Taylor
- The Great Scientist (1912 short) - young chemist
- Billy Gets Arrested (1913 short) - Billy
- Burglarizing Billy (1913 short) - Billy
- Billy's First Quarrel (1913 short) - Billy
- Billy's Adventure (1913 short) - Billy
- Billy in Armor (1913 short) - Billy
- Animated Weekly, no. 67 (1913) "Who's Who in Pictures: Billy Quirk"
- The Egyptian Mummy (1914) - Dick Graham
- The Arrival of Josie (1914) - Hank
- Josie's Coney Island Nightmare (1914) - Hank
- Josie's Declaration of Independence (1914 short) - Hank
- Romantic Josie (1914 short) - Hank
- Josie's Legacy (1914) - Hank
- Our Fairy Play (1914 short) - Willie Finley
- The Girl from Prosperity (1914 short) - Jim
- What Happened to Father? (1915) - Dawson Hale
- The Flirt (1916 short) - acted and directed.
- Intolerance (1916) - Bartender
- The Matinee Idol (1916 short)
- Excess Baggage (1917 short) - Director with Leatrice Joy. Film later adapted in 1919 as His Neglected Wife
- Winning an Heiress (1917 short) - Director.
- The Web of Life (1917) - The Valet
- His Day Out (1918 short)
- The Man Worth While (1921) - Napoleon
- At the Stage Door (1921) - Harold Reade
- My Old Kentucky Home (1922) - Loney Smith
- Success (1923) - Nick Walker
- The Glimpses of the Moon (1923) - Bob Fulmer
- Salomy Jane (1923) - Colonel Starbottle
- Broadway Broke (1923) - Joe Karger
- A Bride for a Knight (1923)
- The Dixie Handicap (1924) - A Tout
