= Verner Clarges =

Silent film actor

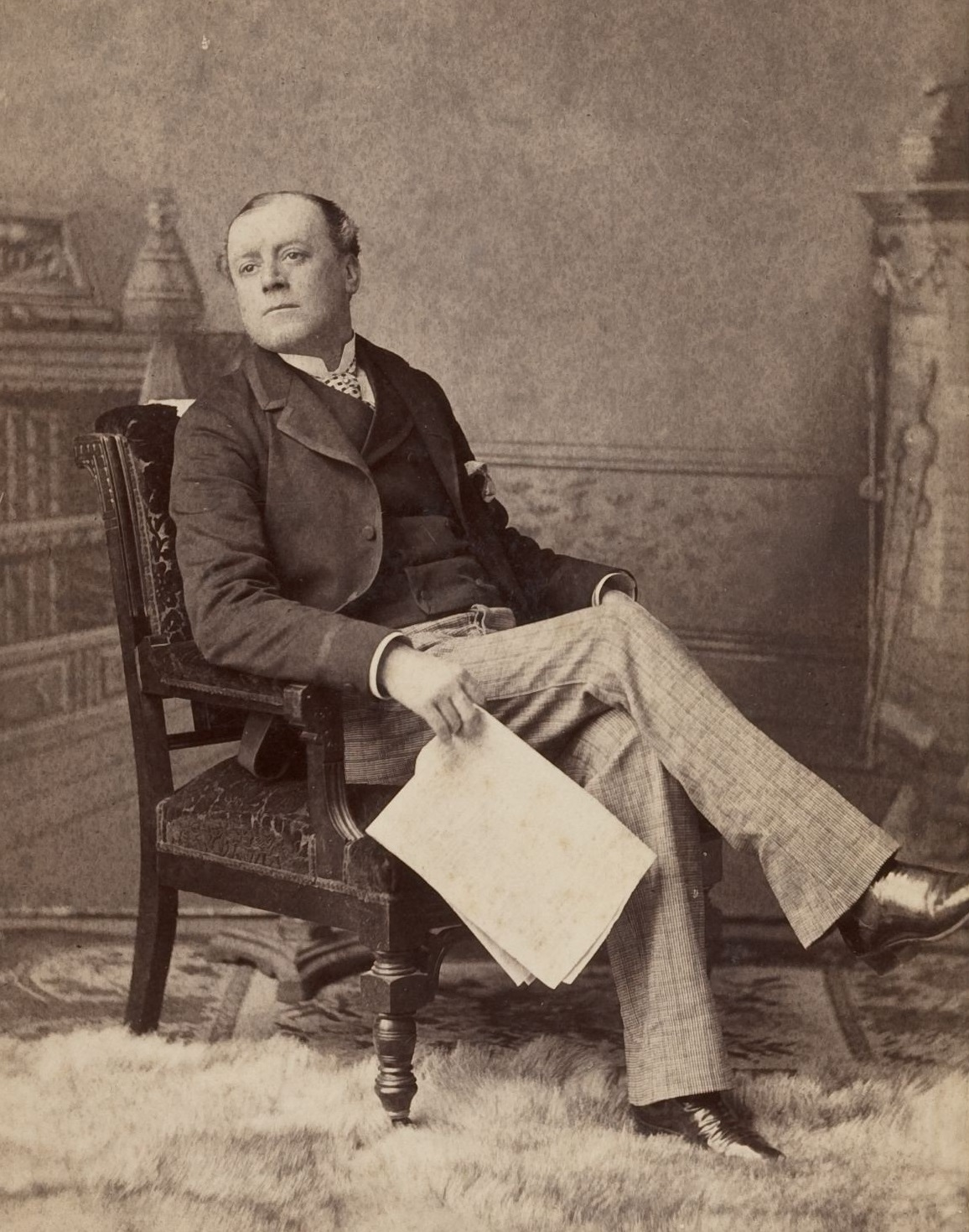
- Born: January 9, 1846; Bath, Somerset, England
- Died: August 11, 1911 (aged 65); New York, New York, US
- Occupation: Actor
- Years active: 1909–1911

Verner Clarges (January 9, 1846 – August 11, 1911) was a stage actor who later appeared in silent films. He appeared in more than 60 films between 1909 and 1911. Clarges was born in Bath, Somerset, England, and came to America in 1883 as a lyceum entertainer. He performed as a platform reader before he became an actor. On August 11, 1911, Clarges died at his home in New York, New York.

== Selected filmography ==
- The Punishment (1912)
- The Lonedale Operator (1911)
- Fisher Folks (1911)
- His Trust Fulfilled (1911)
- Love in Quarantine (1910)
- Rose O'Salem-Town (1910)
- The House with Closed Shutters (1910)
- A Flash of Light (1910)
- What the Daisy Said (1910)
- In the Border States (1910)
- Comata, the Sioux (1909)
- The Hessian Renegades (1909)
