= Stephanie Longfellow =

American stage and film actress

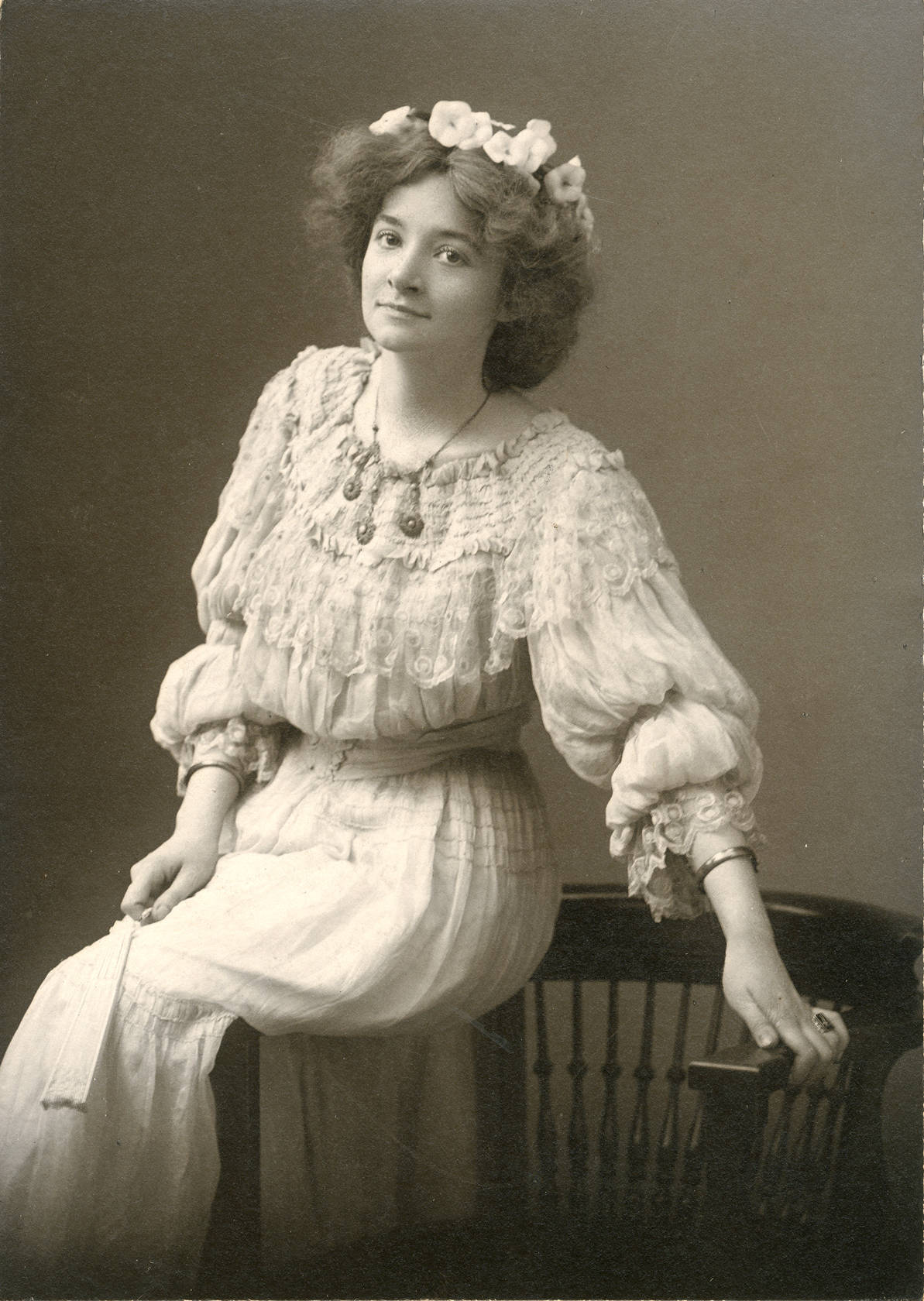
- 1907 portrait of Stephanie Longfellow by photographer Elmer Chickering
- Born: United States
- Occupation: Actress

Stephanie Longfellow (born March 1882) was an American stage and film actress. She started as the understudy of Mabelle Gilman Corey. Her first leading role was as Pert in the 1908 rendition of the play Checkers. She garnered positive reception for her stage performances. She was the grand-niece of the poet Henry Wadsworth Longfellow.

== Career ==
After completing school, Longfellow was the understudy of Mabelle Gilman Corey in the play The Runaway Girl. Her later roles were as Susan in When Johnny Comes Marching Home and as Poppy in San Toy. She had ingénue roles in plays for F. F. Proctor Stock Company and the Empire Stock Company in Boston. Longfellow was in the play The Cow Puncher from 1906 to 1907. Her first leading role was as Pert in the 1908 rendition of the play Checkers. She played the thief Nance Olden in the 1909 play In the Bishop's Carriage which was, at the time, "one of the most novel and difficult roles known to contemporary drama". The Quad-City Times wrote that Longfellow made the character "exceedingly fascinating". The Harrisburg Daily Independent wrote that "it would be difficult to find another actress as capable to fill this exacting part". Portage Daily Democrat, in a review of the 1909 play Graustark, said that Longfellow was "herself a leading lady of the younger generation of more than ordinary ability". The Waukegan News-Sun said of her role in Graustark, "In the part of Princess Yetive, the role necessitates the services of an artist who combines dignity, humor, pathos, etc. These Miss Longfellow possesses in a high degree". Longfellow also acted in over a dozen silent films.

== Personal life ==
Longfellow was born in Boston, Massachusetts, and attended school there. She later attended Woodside and Mt. St. Vincent in New York. Longfellow was known for writing poems while attending school. After she completed school, Longfellow began training to become a singer. Due to her poetry recitation, she received an offer to become an actress. Longfellow said of her grand-uncle Henry Wadsworth Longfellow, "I sometimes wish I had been born just plain 'Miss Nobody' and then I could make a name all by myself". She also said, "I am proud of my name, proud of the man who made it so great. The poet, you know, is only my grand-uncle. Not very close, is it?"
