= Owen Moore =

American actor (1886–1939)

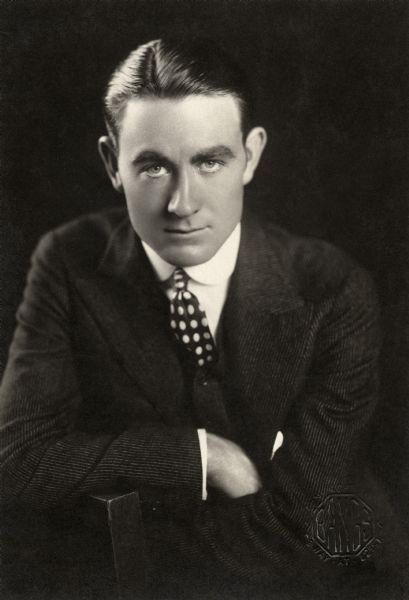
- Moore in 1914
- Born: 12 December 1886; Fordstown Crossroads, County Meath, Ireland
- Died: 9 June 1939 (aged 52); Beverly Hills, California, U.S.
- Resting place: Calvary Cemetery, East Los Angeles
- Years active: 1908-1937
- Spouses: Mary Pickford (m. 1911; div. 1920) Katherine Perry (m. 1921)
- Relatives: Brothers: Tom, Matt and Joe Moore

Owen Moore (12 December 1886 – 9 June 1939) was an Irish-born American actor, appearing in more than 279 movies spanning from 1908 to 1937.

== Early life and career ==
Moore was born in Fordstown Crossroads, County Meath, Ireland. Along with his parents, John and Rose Anna Moore, brothers Tom, Matt, and Joe, and sister Mary, he emigrated to the United States as a steerage passenger on board the S.S. Anchoria. The Moore family were inspected on Ellis Island in May 1896 and settled in the Toledo, Ohio area. Moore and his siblings went on to successful careers in motion pictures in Hollywood, California.

While working at D. W. Griffith's Biograph Studios, Moore met a young Canadian actress named Gladys Smith, whom he married on 7 January 1911. Their marriage was kept secret at first because of the strong opposition of her mother. However, Smith soon overshadowed her husband under her stage name, Mary Pickford. In 1912, he signed on with Victor Studios, co-starring in a number of their films with studio owner/actress Florence Lawrence.

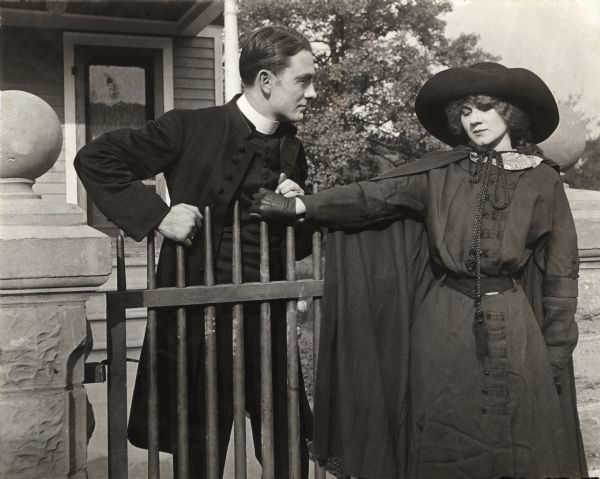
Moore with Florence Lawrence in a scene still from a silent drama, possibly The Redemption of Riverton (1912)

Pickford left Biograph Studios to join the Independent Moving Pictures (IMP) to replace their star, Florence Lawrence. Carl Laemmle, the owner of IMP (IMP later merged into Universal Studios), agreed to sign Moore as part of the deal. This humiliation, together with his wife's meteoric rise to fame, drastically affected Moore, and alcohol became a problem that led to violent behavior and his physically abusing Pickford. In 1916, Pickford met actor Douglas Fairbanks. In 1920, Pickford filed for divorce from Moore when she agreed to his demand of $100,000 settlement. Pickford and Fairbanks married days later.

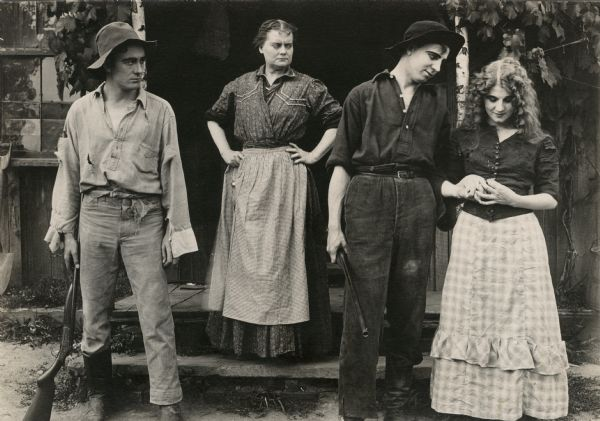
(L-R): Owen Moore, Victory Bateman, Gladden James and Florence Lawrence in After All (1912)

Moore appeared in many successful films for Lewis J. Selznick (father of producer David O. Selznick and agent Myron Selznick), in the late teens and early 1920s. He was a popular star at Selznick Pictures along with Olive Thomas, Elaine Hammerstein, Eugene O'Brien and Conway Tearle. He also appeared in films for his own production company as well as Goldwyn and Triangle.

Moore married a second time to silent film actress, Katherine Perry, in 1921. With the advent of sound film, Moore's career declined, and he became a supporting actor for newer stars. He competed, as the third lead, with Cary Grant and Noah Beery, Sr. for the attentions of Mae West in She Done Him Wrong, Paramount's most lucrative film of 1933. His last film appearance was as a movie director in the 1937 drama A Star Is Born, starring Janet Gaynor and Fredric March – ironically a movie about a former film star who turned to alcohol, much like himself at that time.

== Death ==
After years of fighting alcoholism, Moore was found dead on 9 June 1939, in his apartment in Beverly Hills, California. An Associated Press news report said that he "apparently had been dead two days". An autopsy was scheduled for the next day.

For his contribution to the motion picture industry, Moore has a star on the Hollywood Walk of Fame at 6727 Hollywood Boulevard.

== Selected filmography ==
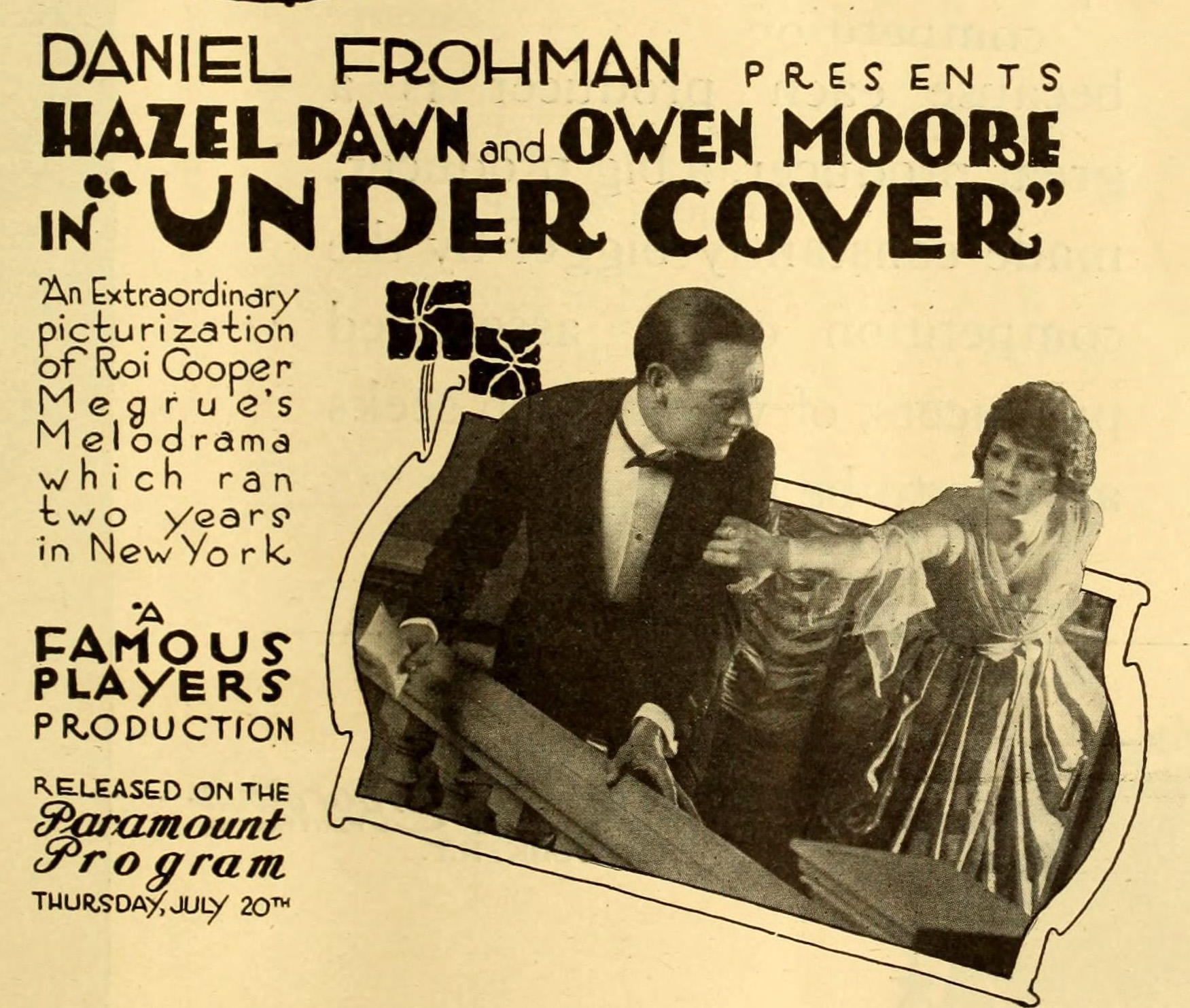
Moore in the 1916 film Under Cover

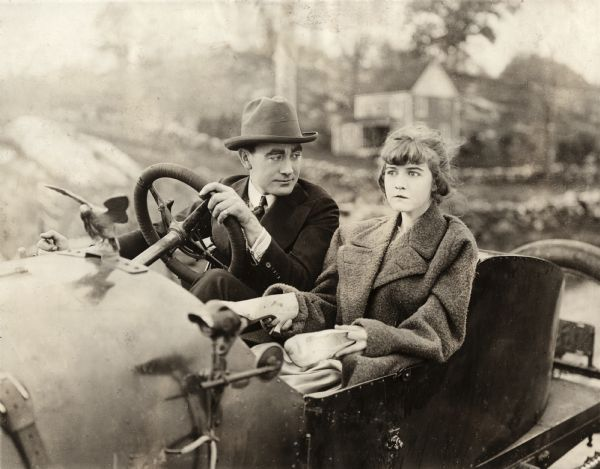
Moore and Dorothy Gish in silent drama Betty of Graystone (1916)

- The Guerrilla (1908 short)
- The Valet's Wife (1908 short)
- The Honor of Thieves (1909 short) as Ned Grattan
- The Sacrifice (1909 short)
- A Rural Elopement (1909 short) In Crowd
- The Criminal Hypnotist (1909 short) as The Man
- The Welcome Burglar (1909 short) In Office / In Bar
- The Brahma Diamond (1909 short)
- The Golden Louis (1909 short) as The Good Samaritan
- Trying to Get Arrested (1909 short) as Passerby
- The Prussian Spy (1909 short) as The Spy
- His Wife's Mother (1909 short) as Restaurant Patron
- A Fool's Revenge (1909 short) as The Duke
- The Roue's Heart (1909 short) as Nobleman
- The Deception (1909 short) as The Rich Patron
- A Burglar's Mistake (1909 short) At Folsom's
- Lady Helen's Escapade (1909 short) as The Boyfriend
- Resurrection (1909 short) At Court / At Prison
- Two Memories (1909 short) as Party Guest
- A Sound Sleeper (1909 short) as Police Officer
- Jones and the Lady Book Agent (1909 hort) as Office Employee
- The Lonely Villa (1909 short) as A Burglar
- The Little Darling (1909 short) In Boarding House
- The Hessian Renegades (1909 short) as Colonial Army Messenger
- Leather Stocking (1909 short) as Leather Stocking
- Pippa Passes (1909 short) as Sibald
- Nursing a Viper (1909 short) as Fleeing Aristocrat
- The Red Man's View (1909 short) as Indian (uncredited)
- In Little Italy (1909 short) At the Ball
- To Save Her Soul (1909 short) At Party
- The Rocky Road (1910 short)
- The Time-Lock Safe (1910 short) as The Friend
- What the Daisy Said (1910 short) (uncredited)
- In the Border States (1910 short)
- Love in Quarantine (1910 short)
- Their First Misunderstanding (1911 short)
- Behind the Times (1911 short) as Billy Thompson
- The Lesser Evil (1912 short)
- The Angel of the Studio (1912 short)
- So Runs the Way (1913 short)
- Caprice (1913) as Jack Henderson
- The Battle of the Sexes (1914) as Cleo's lover
- Home, Sweet Home (1914) as The Tempter
- The Escape (1914) as Dr. von Eiden
- Aftermath (1914) as Allan Buchannan
- Cinderella (1914) as Prince Charming
- Mistress Nell (1915) as King Charles II
- Pretty Mrs. Smith (1915) as Mr. Smith No. 3, Frank
- Help Wanted (1915) as Jack Scott
- Betty in Search of a Thrill (1915) as Jim Denning
- Mabel Lost and Won (1915 short) as Mabel's Sweetheart
- The Little Teacher (1915 short) as Teacher's Fiancé
- Nearly a Lady (1915) as Jack Rawlins
- 'Twas Ever Thus (1915) as Long Biceps / Frank Warren / Jack Rogers
- Jordan Is a Hard Road (1915) as Mark Sheldon
- Betty of Greystone (1916) as David Chandler
- Little Meena's Romance (1916) as The Count
- Susan Rocks the Boat (1916) as Larry O'Neil
- Under Cover (1916) as Steven Denby
- Rolling Stones (1916) as Dave Fulton
- Intolerance (1916) as uncredited extra
- The Kiss (1916) as Jean-Marie
- A Coney Island Princess (1916) as Pete Milholland
- A Girl Like That (1917) as Jim Brooks
- The Little Boy Scout (1917) as Thomas Morton
- The Crimson Gardenia (1919) as Roland Van Dam
- Piccadilly Jim (1919) as James Braithwaite Crocker / Piccadilly Jim
- Sooner or Later (1920) as Patrick Murphy
- The Desperate Hero (1920) as Henry Baird
- The Poor Simp (1920) as Melville G. Carruthers
- The Chicken in the Case (1921) as Steve Perkins
- A Divorce of Convenience (1921) as Jim Blake
- Oh, Mabel Behave (1922) as Randolph Roanoke
- Reported Missing (1922) as Richard Boyd
- Love Is an Awful Thing (1922) as Anthony Churchill
- Modern Matrimony (1923) as Chester Waddington
- Hollywood (1923) as himself
- The Silent Partner (1923) as George Coburn
- Thundergate (1923) as Robert Wells / Kong Sur
- Her Temporary Husband (1923) as Thomas Burton
- Torment (1924) as Hansen
- East of Broadway (1924) as Peter Mullaney
- The Parasite (1925) as Arthur Randall
- Code of the West (1925) as Cal Thurman
- Go Straight (1925) as John Rhodes
- Camille of the Barbary Coast (1925) as Robert Morton
- False Pride (1925) as James Mason Ardsley
- The Blackbird (1926) as Bertram P. Glayde aka West End Bertie
- The Skyrocket (1926) as Mickey Reid
- Married ? (1926) as Dennis Shawn
- Money Talks (1926) as Sam Starling
- The Road to Mandalay (1926) as The Admiral
- The Red Mill (1927) as Dennis
- The Taxi Dancer (1927) as Lee Rogers
- Women Love Diamonds (1927) as Patrick Michael Regan
- Tea for Three (1927) as Philip Collamore
- Becky (1927) as Dan Scarlett
- Husbands for Rent (1927) as Herbert Willis
- The Actress (1928) as Tom Wrench
- Stolen Love (1928) as Curtis Barstow
- High Voltage (1929) as Det. Dan Egan
- Side Street (1929) as Dennis O'Farrell
- What a Widow! (1930) as Gerry Morgan
- Outside the Law (1930) as Harry 'Fingers' O'Dell
- Extravagance (1930) as Jim Hamilton
- Stout Hearts and Willing Hands (1931, Short) as Lookalike Bartender 1
- Hush Money (1931) as Steve Pelton
- As You Desire Me (1932) as Tony Boffie
- She Done Him Wrong (1933) as Chick Clark
- A Man of Sentiment (1933) as Stanley Colton
- A Star Is Born (1937) as Casey Burke - Director (final film role)
