= George Nichols (actor) =

American actor

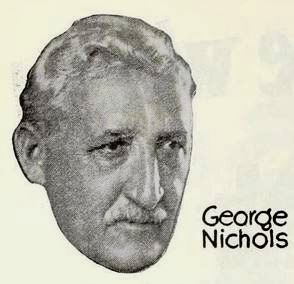
- Nichols in ad for The Flirt (1922)
- Born: October 28, 1864; Rockford, Illinois, US
- Died: September 20, 1927 (aged 62); Hollywood, California, US
- Occupations: Actor, film director
- Years active: 1908–1927
- Spouse: Viola Alberti (m. 1896)

George Nichols, sometimes credited in films as George O. Nicholls (October 28, 1864 – September 20, 1927), was an American actor and film director. He worked at Mack Sennett's Keystone Studios.

Nichols was born in Rockford, Illinois. He made 221 known film appearances from 1908 up to his death in 1927. He also directed 103 films between 1911 and 1916. Along with Henry "Pathe" Lehrman, Nichols became an arch-enemy of Charlie Chaplin very early on in Chaplin's film career, as Chaplin was dissatisfied with Nichols' way of directing and comic ideas while both worked at Keystone in 1914. In his autobiography, Chaplin recalled a dispute between himself and Nichols during the shooting of a film in which Chaplin appeared.

While working at Keystone, 'Pops', as he was known, was often cast as father to Mabel Normand.

== Personal life ==
With his wife Viola Alberti, whom he married in 1896, he was the father of another prolific director, George Nicholls Jr., sometimes also credited as George Nichols, Jr.

The New York Times from 1927 states that beloved actor and director George Nichols died at the age of 62 due to an illness he had for several months because of heart trouble. He died in Hollywood, California.

== Partial filmography ==
=== Actor ===
- Behind the Scenes (1908)
- The Heart of O'Yama (1908)
- A Smoked Husband (1908)
- The Pirate's Gold (1908)
- The Hessian Renegades (1909)
- Pippa Passes (1909)
- The Death Disc: A Story of the Cromwellian Period (1909)
- The Red Man's View (1909)
- In Little Italy (1909)
- To Save Her Soul (1909)
- The Day After (1909)
- The Rocky Road (1910)
- The Woman from Mellon's (1910)
- The Two Brothers (1910)
- The Unchanging Sea (1910)
- What the Daisy Said (1910)
- A Flash of Light (1910)
- The Modern Prodigal (1910) as The Sheriff
- A Mohawk's Way (1910) as Doctor Van Brum
- Heart Beats of Long Ago (1911)
- What Shall We Do with Our Old? (1911)
- The Lily of the Tenements (1911)
- The Lonedale Operator (1911)
- Enoch Arden (1911)
- Fighting Blood (1911)
- Two Daughters of Eve (1912)
- Heredity (1912)
- The Unwelcome Guest (1913)
- A Little Hero (1913)
- Some Nerve (1913)
- The Under-Sheriff (1914)
- A Flirt's Mistake (1914)
- In the Clutches of the Gang (1914)
- Mickey (1918)
- Fame and Fortune (1918)
- A Romance of Happy Valley (1919)
- The Turn in the Road (1919)
- When Doctors Disagree (1919)
- The Greatest Question (1919)
- Victory (1919)
- The Coming of the Law (1919)
- The Family Honor (1920)
- Pinto (1920)
- The Iron Rider (1920)
- Oliver Twist, Jr. (1921)
- The Queen of Sheba (1921)
- The Fox (1921)
- Shame (1921)
- Molly O' (1921)
- Live and Let Live (1921)
- The Barnstormer (1922)
- The Pride of Palomar (1922)
- Don't Get Personal (1922)
- The Flirt (1922)
- The Ghost Patrol (1923)
- Let's Go (1923)
- The Phantom Fortune (1923)
- The Extra Girl (1923)
- Don't Marry for Money (1923)
- The Miracle Makers (1923)
- Children of Dust (1923)
- East of Broadway (1924)
- Geared to Go (1924)
- The Silent Stranger (1924)
- Secrets (1924)
- The Beautiful Sinner (1924)
- The Red Lily (1924)
- Daughters of Today (1924)
- The Silent Watcher (1924)
- Capital Punishment (1925)
- Proud Flesh (1925)
- The Light of Western Stars (1925)
- The Goose Woman (1925)
- His Majesty, Bunker Bean (1925)
- Rolling Home (1926)
- Broken Hearts of Hollywood (1926)
- Flames (1926)
- Gigolo (1926)
- Señor Daredevil (1926)
- White Gold (1927)
- Finger Prints (1927)
- The Wedding March (1928)

=== Director ===
Silent animal comedy A Little Hero (1913) directed by George Nichols for Keystone Studios. A dog saves a parakeet from a cat. Running time: 04:32.

- She (1911)
- Cinderella (1911)
- The Higher Law (1911)
- The Celebrated Case (1912)
- Hazers Hazed (1912)
- Pa's Medicine (1912)
- Under Two Flags (1912)
- Ma and Dad (1912)
- Out of the Dark (1912)
- In Blossom Time (1912)
- Called Back (1912)
- Hill Folks (1912)
- The Princess of Lorraine (1912)
- Whom God Hath Joined (1912)
- The Ring of a Spanish Grandee (1912)
- Jess (1912)
- Love's Miracle (1912)
- The Saleslady (1912)
- Miss Arabella Snaith (1912)
- Dora Thorne (1912)
- The Cry of the Children (1912)
- Rejuvenation (1912)
- Into the Desert (1912)
- A Love of Long Ago (1912)
- The Girl of the Grove (1912)
- For Sale—A Life (1912)
- The Golf Caddie's Dog (1912)
- The Taming of Mary (1912)
- Nicholas Nickleby (1912)
- Flying to Fortune (1912)
- Extravagance (1912)
- The Arab's Bride (1912)
- The Passing (1912)
- He Would a Hunting Go (1913)
- His Sister's Kids (1913)
- Fatty's Flirtation (1913)
- A Ride for a Bride (1913)
- Fatty Joins the Force (1913)
- Wine (1913)
- A Small Time Act (1913)
- Fatty at San Diego (1913)
- Fashion's Toy (1913)
- In the Southland (1913)
- Into the Light (1913)
- The Call of the Heart (1913)
- On Her Wedding Day (1913)
- Retribution (1913)
- A Mock Marriage (1913)
- In the Harem of Haschem (1913)
- A Florida Romance (1913)
- Women of the Desert (1913)
- Tamandra, the Gypsy (1913)
- Dolores' Decision (1913)
- The First Prize (1913)
- The Supreme Sacrifice (1913)
- On the Threshold (1913)
- It Might Have Been (1913)
- The Under-Sheriff (1914)
- A Flirt's Mistake (1914)
- A Fatal Flirtaton (1914)
- When Reuben Fooled the Bandits (1914)
- Finnegan's Bomb (1914)
- When Villains Meet (1914)
- The Bowery Boys (1914)
- The Passing of Izzy (1914)
- Charlot aime la patronne (1914)
- Charlot marquis (1914)
- Charlot est trop galant (1914)
- Charlot fait du cinéma (1914)
- In the Clutches of the Gang (1914)
- Rebecca's Wedding Day (1914)
- A Robust Romeo (1914)
- Mabel's Bear Escape (1914)
- Rebecca's Wedding Day (1914)
- The Under-Sheriff (1914)
- Twixt Love and Fire (1914)
- A Film Johnnie (1914)
- His Favourite Pastime (1914)
- Cruel, Cruel Love (1914)
- The Star Boarder (1914)
- Locked In (1915)
- The Print of the Nails (1915)
- The Lost Messenger (1915)
- The Sculptor's Model (1915)
- The Eternal Feminine (1915)
- The Man with the Iron Heart (1915)
- When Love Is Mocked (1915)
- The Scarlet Lady (1915)
- The Isle of Content (1915)
- Ghosts (1915)
- A Man's Prerogative (1915)
- The Forged Testament (1915)
- A Man and His Work (1915)
- The Grinning Skull (1916)
- Tom Martin: A Man (1916)
- Why Love Is Blind (1916)
