= Ruth Hart =

American actress (1886–1952)

- Born: Ruth E. Hart; August 1886; Jacksonville, Florida, U.S.
- Died: May 2, 1952 (aged 65); New York, New York, U.S.
- Occupation: film actress
- Years active: 1906–late 1920s
- Spouse: Walter J. Moore (m. 1918)
- Children: 3

Ruth E. Hart (August 1886 – 2 May 1952), was an American film and stage actress. She appeared in over 30 films between 1909 and 1914, as well as the original Broadway production of Thomas Dixon Jr.'s The Clansman.

== Biography ==
Born in Jacksonville, Florida, Hart was the daughter of Robert Hart and Laura Swan. She began her career as a secretary to producer A. H. Woods. In 1906, she appeared on Broadway in The Clansman, adapted from the like-named novel by its author, Thomas Dixon Jr. Making what would prove to be her sole Broadway appearance, Hart was cast as the female lead, Nellie Stoneman. Aside from famously being the basis, almost a decade later, for D. W. Griffith's The Birth of a Nation, the play evidently performed much the same function for Hart's film career, judging from the vast preponderance of Griffith titles amongst her confirmed screen appearances. In the meantime, Hart was seen performing the role throughout the United States in touring companies over the next two years.

== Personal life and death ==
In September 1918, Hart married producer Walter John Moore, with whom she had a daughter and two sons.

On May 2, 1952, Hart died in New York City at age 65, survived by her husband and three children.

== Selected filmography ==
- Nursing a Viper (1909)
- Judith of Bethulia (1914)
