= Marion Leonard =

American actress (1881–1956)

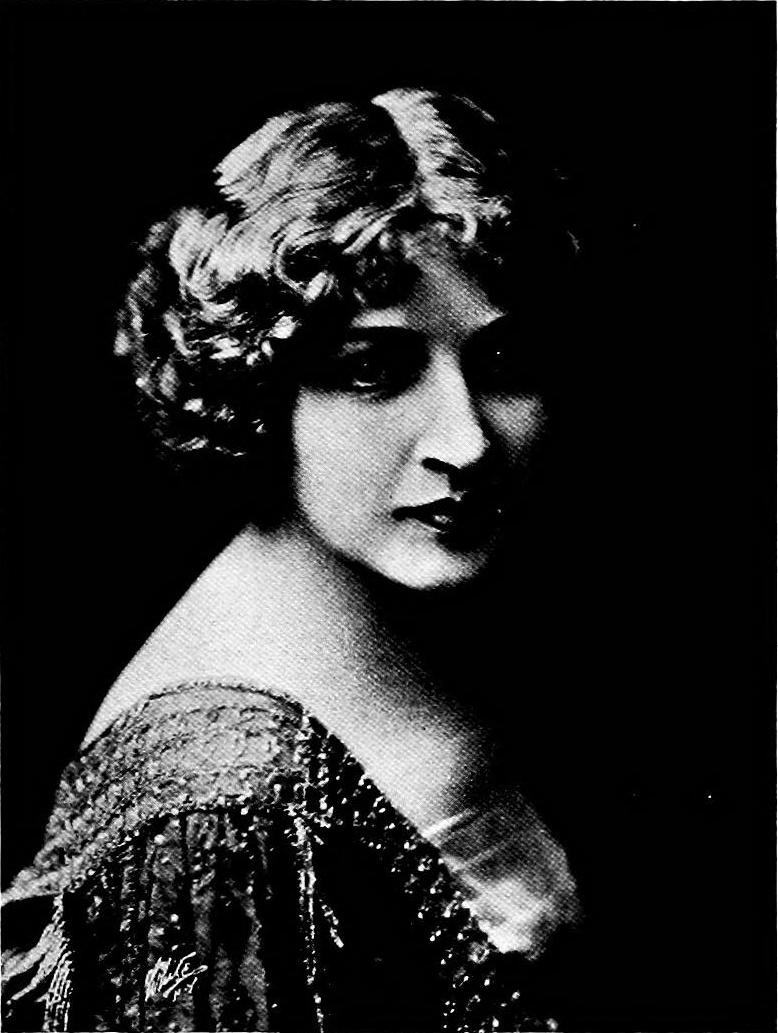
- The Theater of Science, 1914
- Born: June 9, 1881; Cincinnati, Ohio, U.S.
- Died: January 9, 1956 (aged 74); Woodland Hills, California, U.S.
- Occupation: Actress
- Years active: 1908–1915, 1926
- Spouse: Stanner E.V. Taylor

Marion Leonard (June 9, 1881 – January 9, 1956) was an American stage actress who became one of the first motion picture celebrities in the early years of the silent film era.

== Early career ==
Born in Cincinnati, Ohio, Marion Leonard began her acting career in live theatre, but at the age of 27 she started performing in the rapidly expanding film industry. She signed a contract in 1908 with the American Mutoscope and Biograph Company and initially worked at that studio's production facilities in New York City, which were then located at 11 East 14th Street in Manhattan. There she made her screen debut in At the Crossroads of Life, a short directed by Wallace McCutcheon, Jr. and written by D. W. Griffith, who also acted in that film and directed the vast majority of Leonard's other films at Biograph.

Shortly after her screen debut, Leonard became one of the company's leading "photoplayers". At a time when screen credits were not given to actors, she and Florence Auer were the first star actresses to be billed by the studio as a "Biograph Girl". Among the many films Leonard made at Biograph, 32 of them were with an up-and-coming young actress named Mary Pickford.

== Marriage and switch to Universal Pictures ==
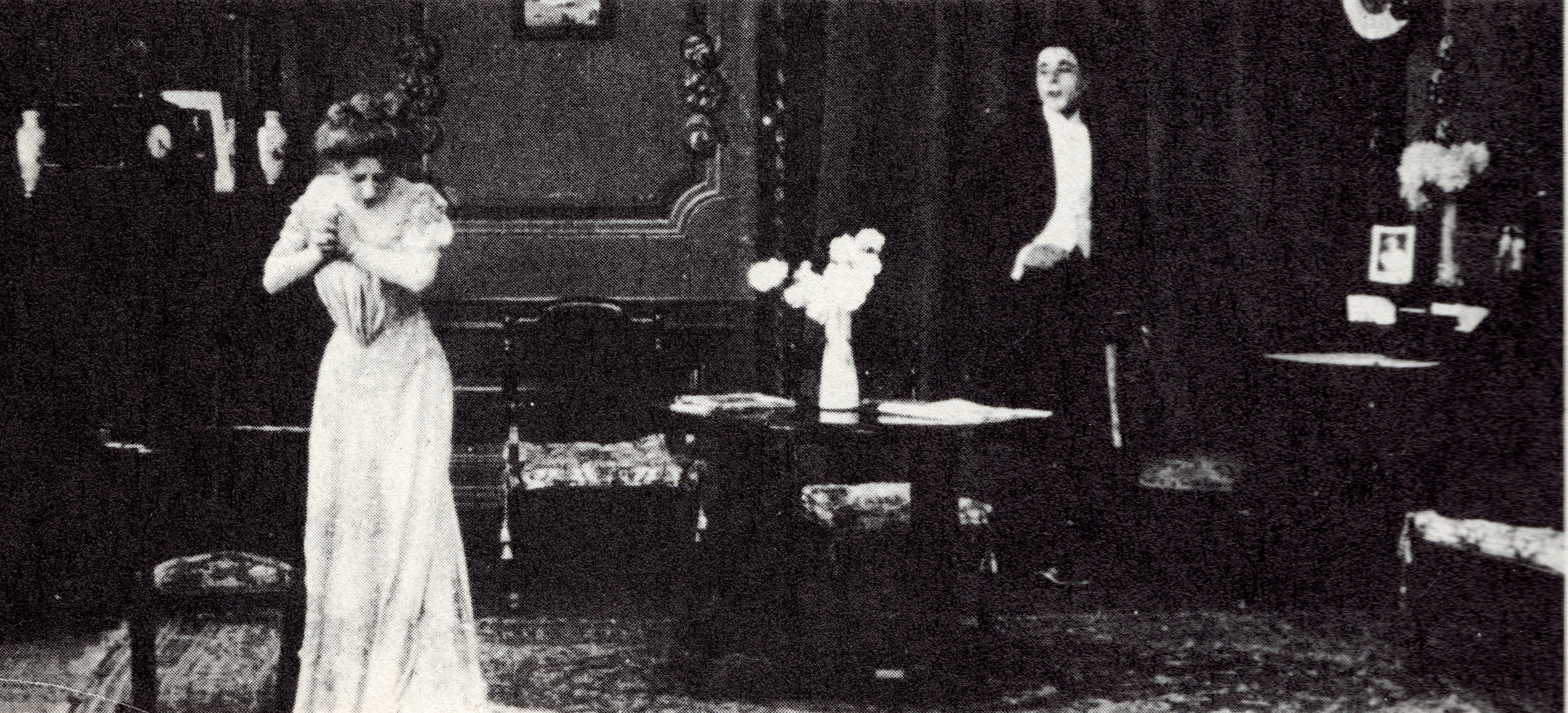
Leonard and D. W. Griffith in At the Crossroads of Life (1908)

While working for Biograph, Leonard met screenwriter/director Stanner E.V. Taylor and a personal relationship developed that led to marriage. They created their own studio, the Gem Motion Picture Company, in 1911 to benefit from Leonard's increasing popularity.

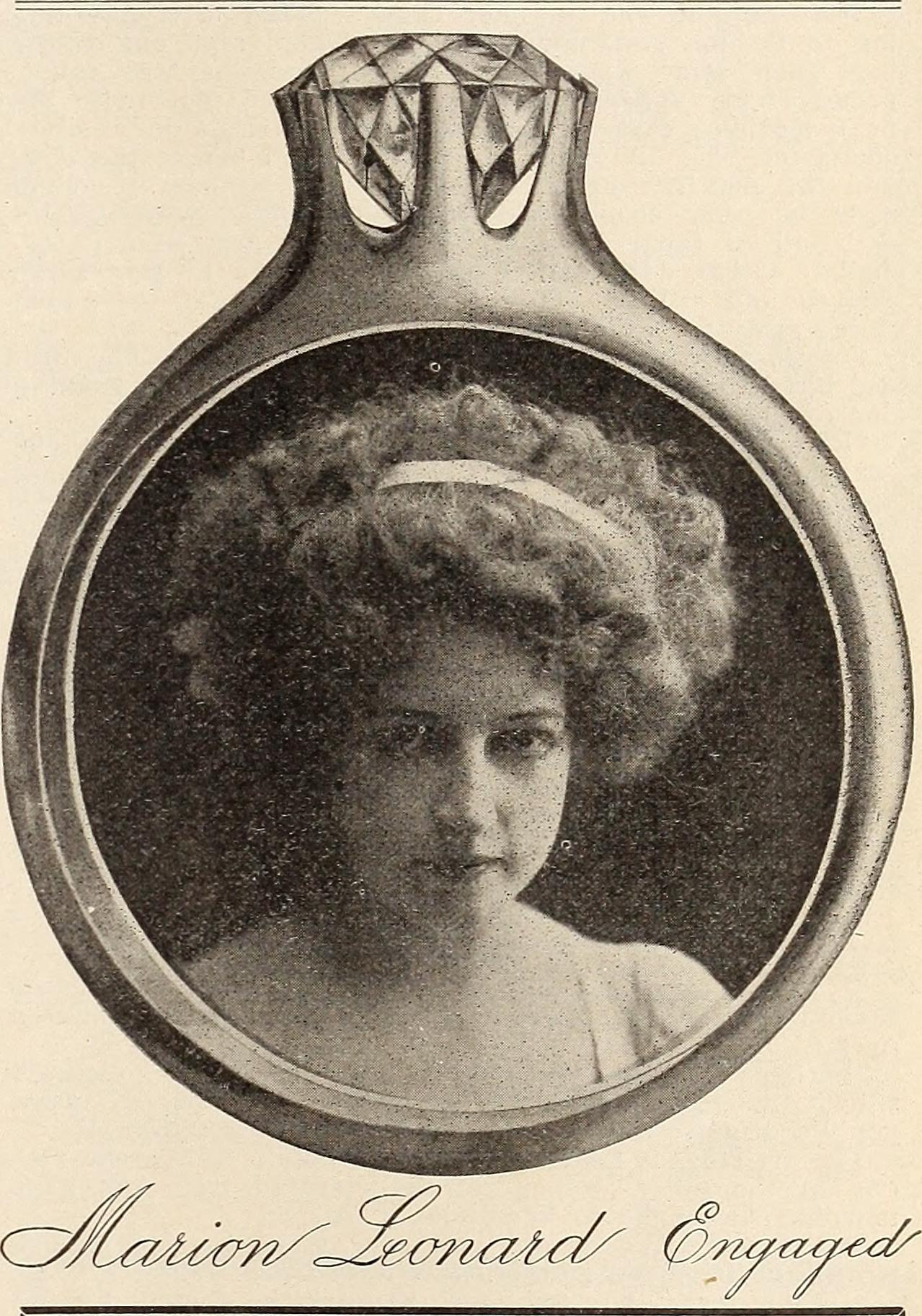
Engagement notice in Motion Picture News, 1911

In 1915, after appearing in more than 150 motion pictures, Leonard retired from film acting. She returned, however, 11 years later at age 45 for one final screen appearance in a 1926 Mack Sennett comedy.

Leonard died in 1956 at the Motion Picture & Television Country House and Hospital in Woodland Hills, California.

== Selected filmography ==
Year	Film	Role	Notes
1909	The Gibson Goddess	Nanette Ranfrea	
1909	The Prussian Spy	Lady Florence	
1909	The Golden Louis	Reveler	
1909	A Fool's Revenge	The Daughter	
1909	A Rude Hostess	Mrs. Leffingwell	
1909	The Roue's Heart	Sculptress	
1909	And a Little Child Shall Lead Them	The Mother	
1909	Leather Stocking	Colonel's Nieces	
1909	A Burglar's Mistake	Mrs. Newman	
1909	A Trap for Santa	Helen Rogers	
1909	Pippa Passes	Ottima	
1909	Two Memories	Marion Francis	
1909	Nursing a Viper	The Wife	
1909	The Sealed Room	The Countess	
1913	Carmen	Carmen	
1914	The Awakening of Donna Isolla		
