= Winning Back His Love =

1910 film directed by D. W. Griffith

- Directed by: D. W. Griffith
- Written by: Anthony Donnelly
- Produced by: Biograph Company
- Starring: Wilfred Lucas
- Cinematography: Billy Bitzer
- Distributed by: Biograph Company
- Release date: December 26, 1910
- Running time: 17 minutes
- Country: United States
- Language: Silent (English intertitles)

Winning Back His Love is a 1910 silent film short directed by D. W. Griffith.

== Cast ==
- Wilfred Lucas as Frederick Wallace
- Stephanie Longfellow as Mrs. Frederick Wallace
- Vivian Prescott as Vera Blair
- Edwin August as A Friend
- Alfred Paget as A Servant
- Jeanie MacPherson as A Servant
- Dorothy Bernard
- Verner Clarges
- Charles Craig as A Waiter
- Donald Crisp as At Stage Door
- Frank Evans as At Stage Door
- Joseph Graybill as At Stage Door
- Robert Harron as At Stage Door
- Guy Hedlund as At Stage Door
- Harry Hyde as At Stage Door

== See also ==
- List of American films of 1910
