= The Ordeal of Rosetta =

1917 film directed by Emile Chautard

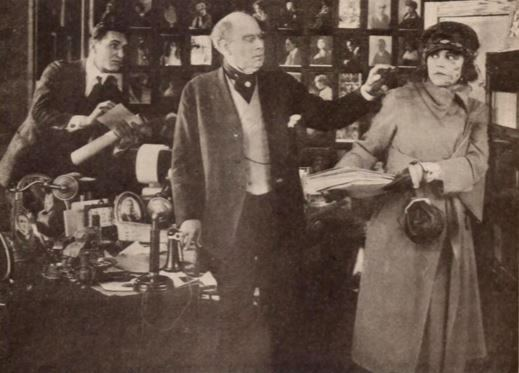
- Directed by: Emile Chautard
- Written by: Edmund Goulding; Paul West
- Starring: Alice Brady; Crauford Kent; Ormi Hawley
- Cinematography: Jacques Bizeul
- Production company: Select Pictures
- Distributed by: Select Pictures
- Release date: May 1918
- Running time: 50 minutes
- Country: United States
- Languages: Silent; English intertitles

The Ordeal of Rosetta is a 1918 American silent drama film directed by Emile Chautard and starring Alice Brady, Crauford Kent and Ormi Hawley.

== Cast ==
- Alice Brady as Rosetta / Lola Gelardi (twins)
- Crauford Kent as Aubrey Hapgood
- Ormi Hawley as Ruth Hapgood
- Henry Leone as Professor Gelardi
- Maude Turner Gordon as Mrs. Hapgood
- Hazel Washburn as Mildred Sanders
- Edmund Burns as Dick
- George Henry as Theatrical Agent

== Censorship ==
The Ordeal of Rosetta was rejected by the Kansas Board of Review, with no reason given.

== Bibliography ==
- Giorgio Bertellini. Italy in Early American Cinema: Race, Landscape, and the Picturesque. Indiana University Press, 2010.
