= The Servant Question =

1920 film directed by Dell Henderson

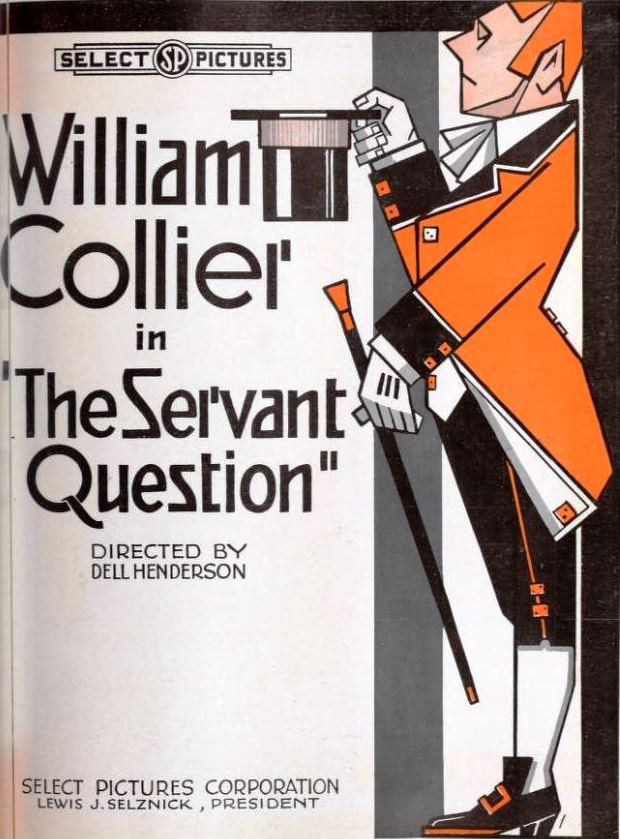
- Directed by: Dell Henderson
- Written by: Dell Henderson
- Produced by: Lewis J. Selznick
- Starring: William Collier Sr. Virginia Lee; William Collier Jr.
- Production company: Selznick Pictures
- Distributed by: Select Pictures
- Release date: June 20, 1920
- Running time: 50 minutes
- Country: United States
- Language: Silent (English intertitles)

The Servant Question is a 1920 American silent comedy mystery film directed by Dell Henderson and starring William Collier Sr., Virginia Lee, and William Collier Jr.

== Cast ==
- William Collier Sr. as Mr. Butler
- Virginia Lee as Muriel Merrick
- William Collier Jr. as Jack Merrick
- Armand Cortes as Count Amboy
- Rapley Holmes as Mr. Merrick

== Bibliography ==
- James Robert Parish & Michael R. Pitts. Film directors: a guide to their American films. Scarecrow Press, 1974.
