= The Road Called Straight =

1919 film directed by Lloyd Ingraham

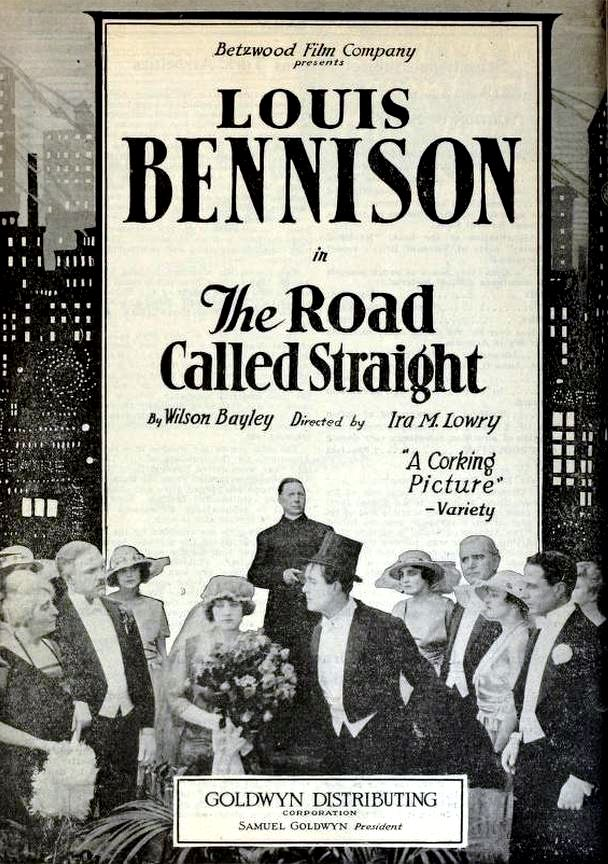
- Advertisement for The Road Called Straight on page 6 of the Film Daily (June 1, 1919).
- Directed by: Ira M. Lowry
- Story by: Wilson Bayley
- Starring: Louis Bennison; Ormi Hawley; Henry Mortimer; Berton Churchill; Jane Adler; John Daly Murphy
- Cinematography: David Calcagni
- Production company: Betzwood Film Company
- Distributed by: Goldwyn Pictures
- Release date: April 20, 1919
- Running time: 5 reels
- Country: United States
- Language: Silent (English intertitles)

The Road Called Straight is a 1919 American silent comedy-drama film directed by Ira M. Lowry and starring Louis Bennison, Ormi Hawley, Henry Mortimer, Berton Churchill, Jane Adler, and John Daly Murphy. The film was released by Goldwyn Pictures on April 20, 1919.

== Cast ==
- Louis Bennison as Al Boyd
- Ormi Hawley as Betty Swiftmore
- Henry Mortimer as Harrison Stevens
- Berton Churchill as Robert Swiftmore
- Jane Adler as Betty's Mother
- John Daly Murphy as Steven's Valet

== Preservation ==
The film is now considered lost.
