= Virginia Lee (actress) =

American actress

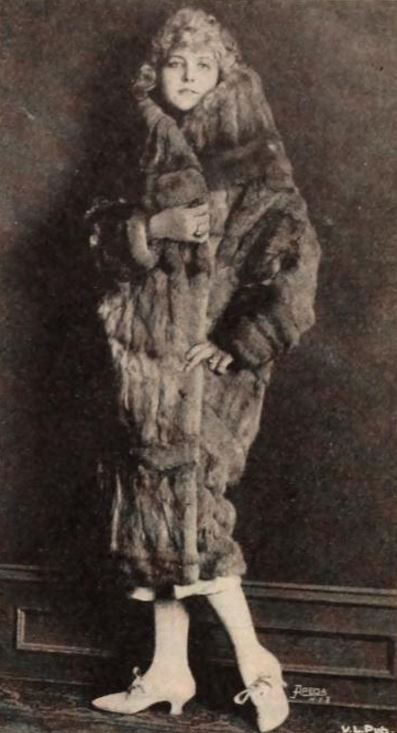
- Lee in 1920
- Born: July 14, 1901; Mexico City, Mexico
- Died: January 14, 1996 (aged 94); Englewood, Florida, United States
- Occupation: Actress
- Years active: 1916–1936 (film)

Virginia Lee (July 14, 1901 – January 14, 1996) was an American film actress of the silent era.

== Selected filmography ==
- The Terror (1917)
- The Gulf Between (1917)
- Beyond the Law (1918)
- The Whirlpool (1918)
- Oh, Johnny! (1918)
- Luck and Pluck (1919)
- Sandy Burke of the U-Bar-U (1919)
- The Servant Question (1920)
- A Daughter of Two Worlds (1920)
- The Fortune Teller (1920)
- For Love or Money (1920)
- Scrambled Wives (1921)
- If Women Only Knew (1921)
- The White Masks (1921)
- Beyond the Rainbow (1922)
- Destiny's Isle (1922)
- If Winter Comes (1923)
- The Adorable Cheat (1928)
- Fatal Lady (1936)

== Bibliography ==
- Katchmer, George A. A Biographical Dictionary of Silent Film Western Actors and Actresses. McFarland, 2015.
