= Contraband (1925 film) =

1925 film by Alan Crosland

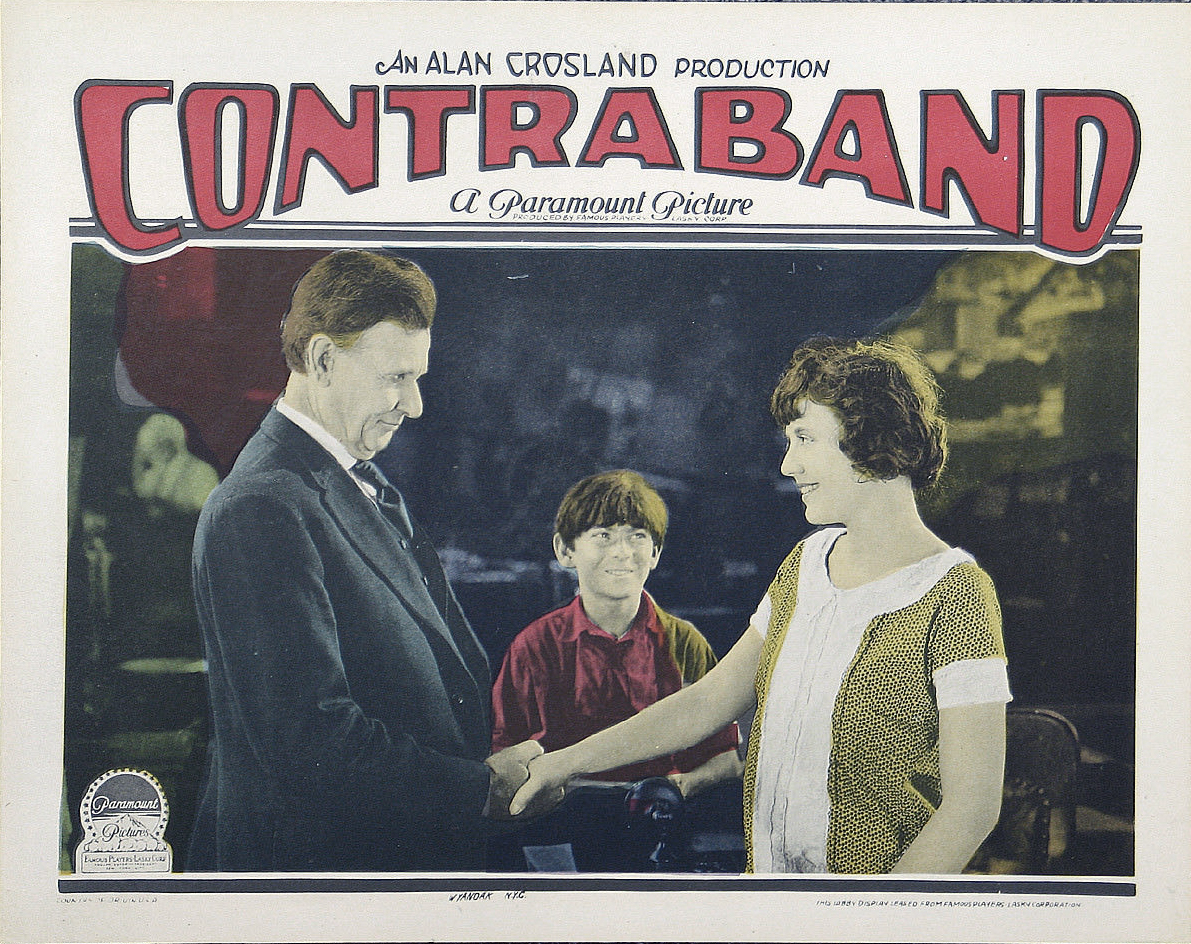
- Directed by: Alan Crosland
- Written by: Jack Cunningham (scenario)
- Based on: Contraband by Charles Buddington Kelland
- Produced by: Adolph Zukor; Jesse Lasky
- Starring: Lois Wilson
- Cinematography: Al Siegler
- Distributed by: Paramount Pictures
- Release date: February 16, 1925
- Running time: 92 minutes
- Country: United States
- Language: Silent (English intertitles)

Contraband is a lost 1925 silent film produced by Famous Players–Lasky and distributed by Paramount Pictures. Alan Crosland directed and Lois Wilson stars. The film is based on the novel, Contraband, by Charles Buddington Kelland. It was the last film directed by Alan Crosland in co-operation with the distributor, Paramount Pictures.

== Cast ==
- Lois Wilson as Carmel Lee
- Noah Beery as Deputy Jenney
- Raymond Hatton as Launcelot Bangs
- Raymond McKee as Evan B. Pell
- Charles Ogle as Sheriff Churchill
- Luke Cosgrove as Tubal
- Edward Davis as Abner Fownes
- Johnny Fox as Simmy
- Victor Potel as George Bogardus
- Alphonse Ethier as Jared Whitfield
- Cesare Gravina as Pee Wee Bangs
- Lillian Leighton as Mrs. Churchill
