= Oh, Johnny! =

1918 film

- Directed by: Ira M. Lowry
- Story by: Wilson Bayley
- Starring: Louis Bennison; Alphonse Ethier; Edward Roseman; John Daly Murphy; Frank Goldsmith; Virginia Lee
- Cinematography: David Calcagni
- Production company: Betzwood Film Company
- Distributed by: Goldwyn Pictures
- Release date: December 22, 1918
- Running time: 5 reels
- Country: United States
- Languages: Silent; English intertitles

Oh, Johnny! is a 1918 American silent Western comedy film directed by Ira M. Lowry and starring Louis Bennison, Alphonse Ethier, Edward Roseman, John Daly Murphy, Frank Goldsmith, and Virginia Lee. The film was released by Goldwyn Pictures on December 22, 1918.

== Cast ==
- Louis Bennison as Johnny Burke
- Alphonse Ethier as John Bryson
- Edward Roseman as Charlie Romero
- John Daly Murphy as Van Pelt Butler
- Frank Goldsmith as Earl of Barncastle
- Virginia Lee as Adele Butler
- Anita Cortez as Dolores
- Louise Brownell as Mrs. Van Pelt Butler
- Russell Simpson as Adele's Father
- Frank Evans (uncredited)

== Preservation ==
A copy of Oh, Johnny! exists at the Museum of Modern Art.
