= Alphonse Ethier =

American actor

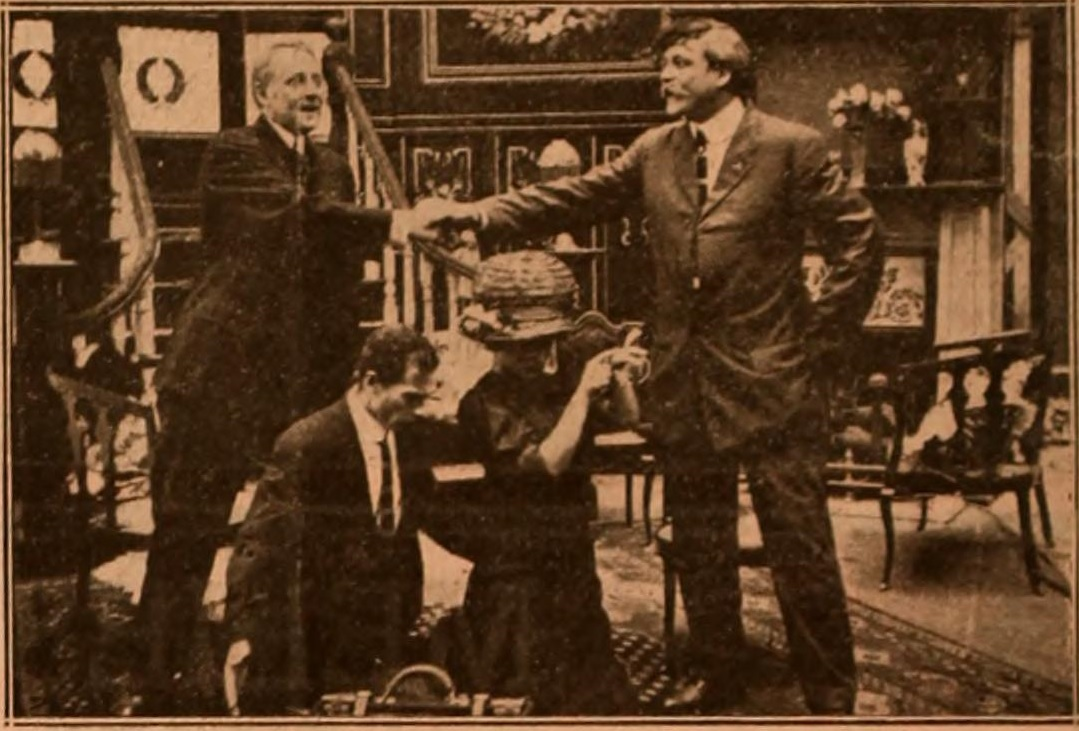
- Frank H. Crane, Violet Heming and Alphonse Ethier in An Assisted Elopement (1910)
- Born: December 10, 1874; Virginia City, Nevada, U.S.
- Died: January 4, 1943 (aged 68); Hollywood, California, U.S.
- Occupation: Actor
- Years active: 1910–1939
- Spouse: Catherine Falloway

Alphonse Ethier (December 10, 1874 – January 4, 1943) was an American film actor. He appeared in more than 70 films between 1910 and 1939. His first name was sometimes spelled Alphonz.

Ethier acted on stage before he began making films with the Thanhouser Company. His film debut came in Thelma (1910).

Ethier was married to the former Catherine Falloway, a "prima donna of light opera and musical comedy".

== Partial filmography ==
- She (1911)
- The Patriot and the Spy (1915)
- The Forbidden Path (1918)
- Rough and Ready (1918)
- Oh, Johnny! (1918)
- Sandy Burke of the U-Bar-U (1919)
- A Message from Mars (1921)
- The Lone Wolf (1924)
- The Moral Sinner (1924)
- The Alaskan (1924)
- Contraband (1925)
- The People vs. Nancy Preston (1925)
- The Lone Wolf Returns (1926)
- Breed of the Sea (1926)
- The Fighting Eagle (1927) - Major Oliver
- Alias the Lone Wolf (1927)
- Shadows of the Night (1928)
- Say It with Sables (1928)
- The Donovan Affair (1929)
- His First Command (1929)
- Smoke Bellew (1929)
- Men of America (1932)
- Baby Face (1933)
- Ex-Lady (1933)
- British Agent (1934)
- Red Morning (1934)
- The Baroness and the Butler (1938)
