= The Last Door (film) =

1921 silent film

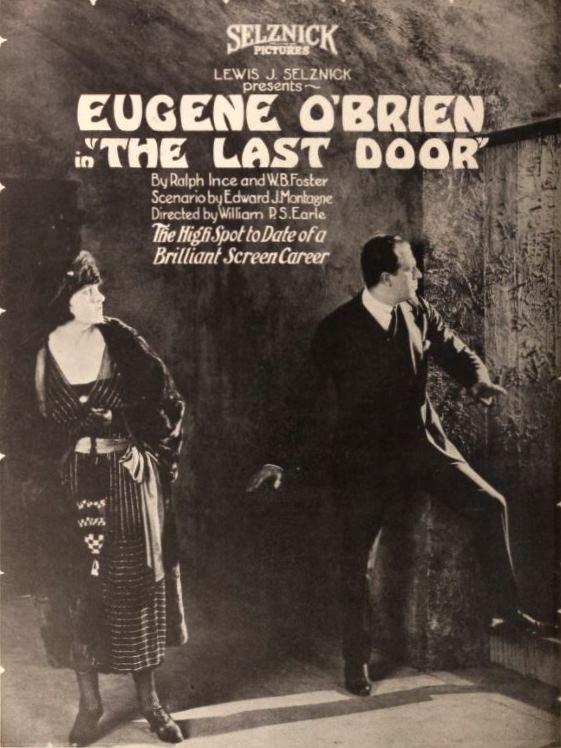
- Directed by: William P.S. Earle
- Written by: W. Bert Foster; Ralph Ince; Edward J. Montagne
- Produced by: Lewis J. Selznick
- Starring: Eugene O'Brien; Nita Naldi; Charles Craig
- Cinematography: Jules Cronjager
- Production company: Selznick Pictures
- Distributed by: Selznick Pictures
- Release date: May 10, 1921
- Running time: 50 minutes
- Country: United States
- Languages: Silent; English intertitles

The Last Door is a 1921 American silent mystery film directed by William P.S. Earle and starring Eugene O'Brien, Nita Naldi and Charles Craig.

== Cast ==
- Eugene O'Brien as The Magnet
- Charles Craig as Freddie Tripp
- Nita Naldi as The Widow
- Helen Pillsbury as Mrs. Rogers
- Martha Mansfield as Helen Rogers
- Katherine Perry as Guest
- Warren Cook as Colonel

== Bibliography ==
- Munden, Kenneth White. The American Film Institute Catalog of Motion Pictures Produced in the United States, Part 1. University of California Press, 1997.
