= A Misfit Earl =

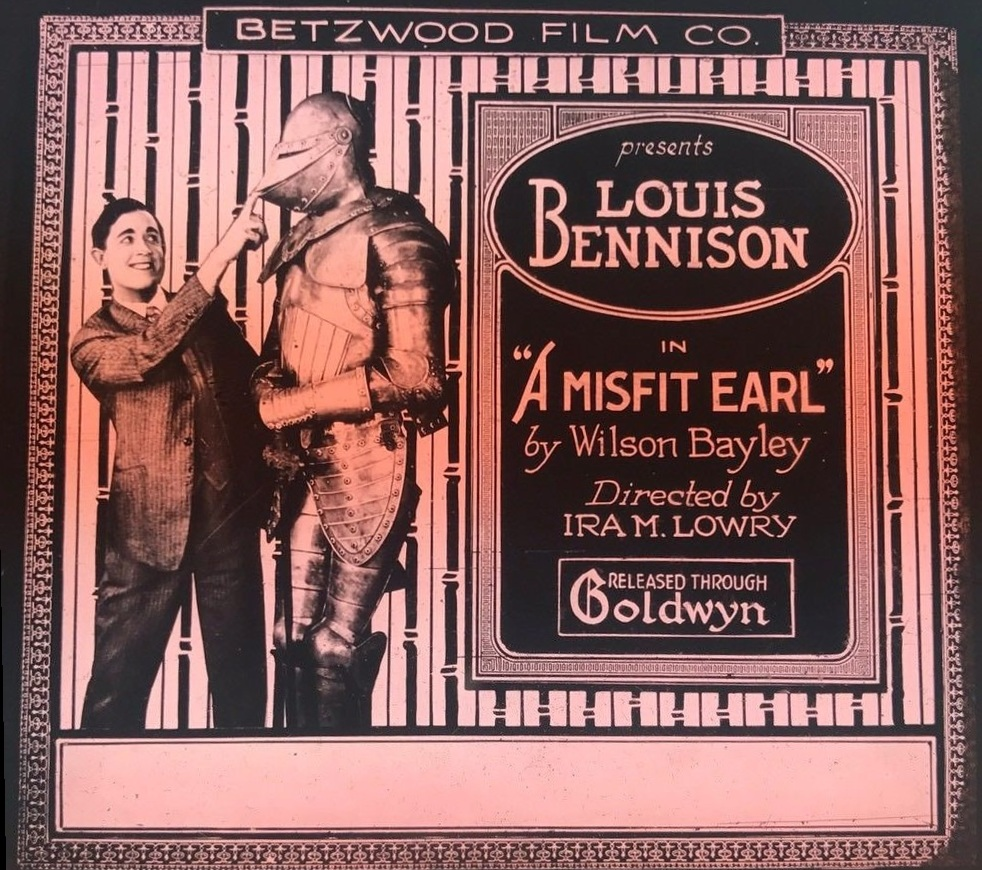
- Lantern slide.
- Directed by: Ira M. Lowry
- Written by: Wilson Bayley (story)
- Screenplay by: Wilson Bayley
- Starring: Louis Bennison; Samuel Ross; Charles Brandt; Neil Moran; Ida Waterman; Claire Adams
- Cinematography: David Calcagni
- Production company: Betzwood Film Company
- Distributed by: Goldwyn Pictures
- Release date: November 16, 1919
- Running time: 5 reels
- Country: United States
- Language: Silent (English intertitles)

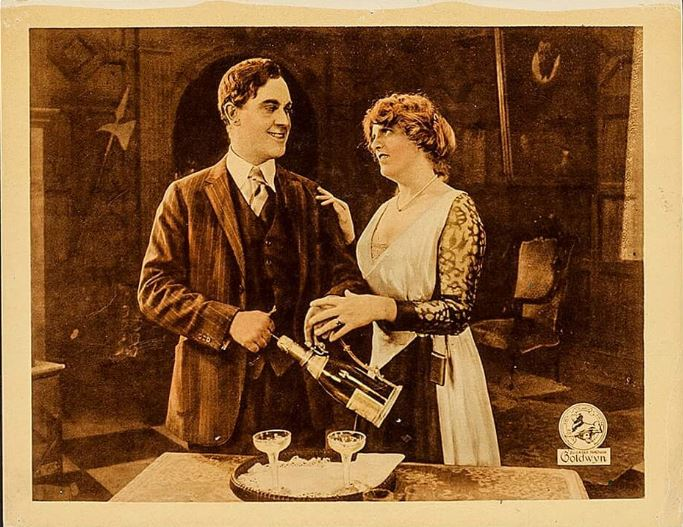
Lobby card

A Misfit Earl is a 1919 American silent comedy film directed by Ira M. Lowry, and starring Louis Bennison, Samuel Ross, Charles Brandt, Neil Moran, Ida Waterman, and Claire Adams. The film was released by Goldwyn Pictures on November 16, 1919.

== Cast ==
- Louis Bennison as Jim Dunn
- Samuel Ross as Sam
- Charles Brandt as Earl of Dunhaven
- Neil Moran as John Grahame
- Ida Waterman as Lady Caroline Croxter
- Claire Adams as Phyllis Burton
- Herbert Standing as Hon. Guy Wyndham
- Barbara Allen as Alysse Byecroft

== Preservation ==
A print of the film survives at the Museum of Modern Art.
