= The Golf Specialist =

1930 film

- Directed by: Monte Brice
- Written by: W. C. Fields
- Produced by: Lou Brock
- Starring: W. C. Fields; Shirley Grey; Johnny Kane; Allan Wood; William Black; Naomi Casey; John Dunsmuir
- Cinematography: Frank Zucker
- Edited by: Russell G. Shields
- Distributed by: RKO Pictures
- Release date: August 22, 1930
- Running time: 20 min.
- Country: United States
- Language: English

The Golf Specialist is a 1930 pre-Code comedy short subject released by RKO Radio Pictures, and starring W. C. Fields. It was his first talkie. The film was produced at the Ideal studio in Hudson Heights, New Jersey. Many pioneer film studios in America were based in New Jersey, and a few of these production facilities were still being used in 1930.

The film features lines such as "I would never hit a woman, not even my own mother" and "Stand clear and keep your eye on the ball", a line Fields also used in the golf scene in The Dentist (1932). Fields had first performed his golf routine on film in his silent feature So's Your Old Man (1926) and reprised it in that film's sound remake, You're Telling Me! (1934). In The Golf Specialist the sketch is staged entirely indoors, using an imitation-grass carpet and a "lakeside" backdrop.

== Plot ==
In a Florida hotel, the house detective's wife is an incessant flirt. When the detective catches her approaching a man, he bends the unfortunate man into a circle and rolls him out the door. Deep Sea McGurk asks the desk clerk for J. Effington Bellweather, but he is not in. McGurk dictates a angry note for Bellweather -- he wants to collect the $40 Bellweather owes him.

Bellweather enters, and the desk clerk gives him the note from McGurk, which he tears up. ("Silly little girl," he murmurs.) After brief encounters with a bratty child and the house detective, Bellweather offers to teach the detective's wife how to play golf.

Out on the course, Bellweather keeps up a running commentary on his golf game but never actually hits the ball. He is continuously interrupted by such distractions as the incompetent caddy's squeaking shoes, the wind blowing papers into his path, and his accidentally stepping into a pie that the caddy had brought.

Finally, the sheriff and the house detective come out to the course to arrest con artist Bellweather for a long list of absurd crimes (including "eating spaghetti in public", "jumping board bill in seventeen lunatic asylums", "failure to pay installments on a strait-jacket", and "possessing a skunk"). Just as Bellweather demonstrates keeping the wrists close together while gripping the club, the sheriff claps handcuffs on him and leads him away.

== Cast ==
- W.C. Fields as J. Effington Bellweather
- Shirley Grey as House Detective's Wife
- Johnny Kane as Walter, the Hotel Desk Clerk
- Allan Wood as Caddy
- John Dunsmuir as House Detective
- William Black as Deep Sea McGurk
- Naomi Casey as Bratty Little Girl
- Harriet MacGibbon as Woman Walking Dog

== Production ==
In late 1929 W. C. Fields, then working in New York, tried to exercise the motion picture rights to his old stage sketch "The Family Ford", only to find that it had already been filmed as a Vitaphone short. Fields, determined that such unauthorized use would not happen again, arranged with nearby movie producer Lou Brock to make a talking picture of "An Episode on the Links." Brock was releasing his films through RKO, assuring national exposure for Fields.

Most of the cast members were stage actors who made occasional films, except Fields and Shirley Grey who pursued full-time film careers in Hollywood. Vaudeville dancer Allan Wood, one of Fields's stooges on stage, played the hapless caddy. Today's viewers may be interested in seeing the first film appearance of Harriet MacGibbon, then a 24-year-old stage actress who achieved TV fame three decades later, as the long-suffering "Mrs. Drysdale" on The Beverly Hillbillies. In the Fields short, she's the haughty young lady on the links, walking her dog.

The golf sketch only lasted 10 to 12 minutes on stage, and involved only four people (Fields, the girl, the caddy, and the showgirl with the dog). Other scenes had to be added to bring the film up to a length of two reels (20 minutes). These additional scenes were staged on a hotel-lobby set, where other cast members interacted with Fields.

== Reception ==
Joe Bigelow of Variety commented on the sketch's familiarity: "Bill Fields used this sketch on and off in vaude and in the Follies. To anyone having seen this sketch in the show or in vaude, the picture version will not seem as comical, but to those who haven't The Golf Specialist ought to be a laugh-getter. Monte Brice directed and got most of the golfing pantomime and slapstick in the camera's eye effectively enough." Billboard also noted the deja vu aspects of the piece but added, "Those who have seen the act on the stage will still like it, while those who have never seen it should still get numerous good guffaws. It is an interesting filler and particularly amusing to golf enthusiasts."

Although the film turned out well enough, it did not lead to further film assignments for Fields. He was forced to leave New York for Hollywood, where he found little work because his price was too expensive: he always insisted on his high Broadway salary. He finally made four short comedies for Mack Sennett that caught on, leading to a string of successful feature films for Paramount Pictures and then Universal Pictures.

== Notes ==
The Golf Specialist went out of circulation in November 1930 and didn't resurface until February 1967, when film archivist Raymond Rohauer appeared on NBC's Today show to promote his theatrical revival of W. C. Fields shorts.

The Golf Specialist is one of the few W. C. Fields films that fell into the public domain after the copyrights lapsed. As such, these films frequently appear on inexpensive video or DVD compilations.
