= Pretty Mrs. Smith =

1915 film by Hobart Bosworth

- Directed by: Hobart Bosworth
- Screenplay by: Elmer Blaney Harris; Oliver Morosco
- Produced by: Hobart Bosworth
- Starring: Fritzi Scheff; Louis Bennison; Forrest Stanley; Owen Moore; Lela Bliss
- Cinematography: George W. Hill
- Production companies: Hobart Bosworth Productions; Oliver Morosco Photoplay Company
- Distributed by: Paramount Pictures
- Release date: March 29, 1915
- Running time: 50 minutes
- Country: United States
- Language: English

Pretty Mrs. Smith is a lost 1915 American comedy silent film directed by Hobart Bosworth and written by Elmer Blaney Harris and Oliver Morosco. The film stars Fritzi Scheff, Louis Bennison, Forrest Stanley, Owen Moore and Lela Bliss. The film was released on March 29, 1915, by Paramount Pictures.

== Cast ==
- Fritzi Scheff as Pretty Mrs. Drucilla Smith
- Louis Bennison as Mr. Smith No. 1, Ferdinand
- Forrest Stanley as Mr. Smith No. 2, Forrest
- Owen Moore as Mr. Smith No. 3, Frank
- Lela Bliss as Letitia Proudfoot

== See also ==
- List of Paramount Pictures films
