= Where Love Leads =

1916 silent film drama directed by Frank Griffin

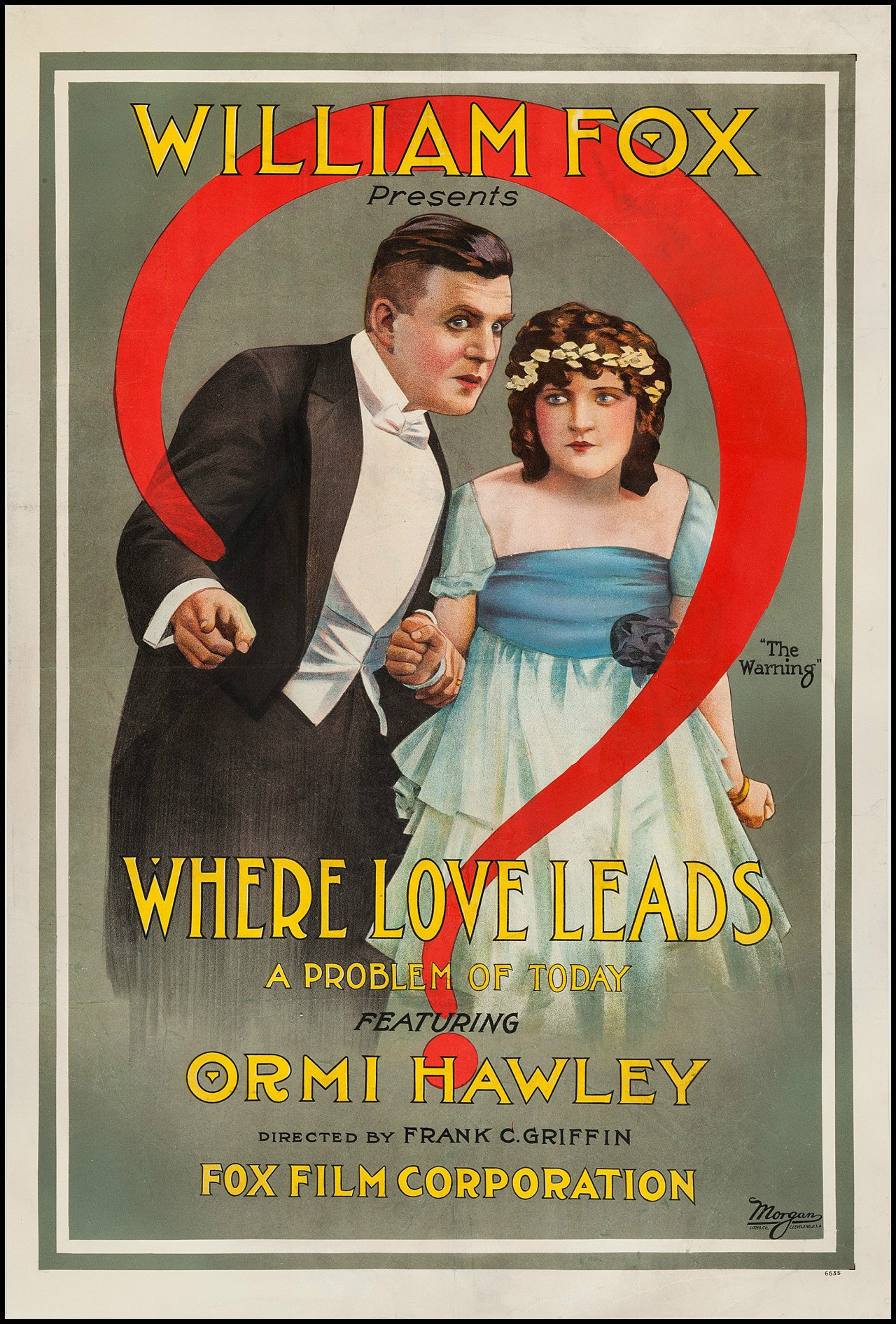
- Directed by: Frank Griffin
- Written by: Frank Griffin
- Produced by: William Fox
- Starring: Ormi Hawley; Rockliffe Fellowes
- Cinematography: Robert Newhard
- Distributed by: Fox Film Corporation
- Release date: June 12, 1916
- Running time: 5 reels
- Country: USA
- Language: Silent...English titles

Where Love Leads is a lost 1916 silent film drama directed by Frank Griffin and starring Ormi Hawley and Rockliffe Fellowes. It was produced and distributed by Fox Film Corporation.

== Cast ==
- Ormi Hawley - Marion Barstow
- Rockliffe Fellowes - Richard Warren
- Royal Byron - Fred Mason
- Hayden Stevenson - Duke Canton (*as Haydn Stevenson)
- Charles Craig - Sir Rankin Chatsworth
- Herbert Evans - E. Faris Hawtrey
- Albert Gran - Kennedy Barstow
- Maud Hall Macey - Mrs. Barstow
- Ilean Hume - Kathleen Chatsworth
- Dorothy Rogers - Camille Dore

== See also ==
- 1937 Fox vault fire
