= Louis Bennison =

American actor (1884–1929)

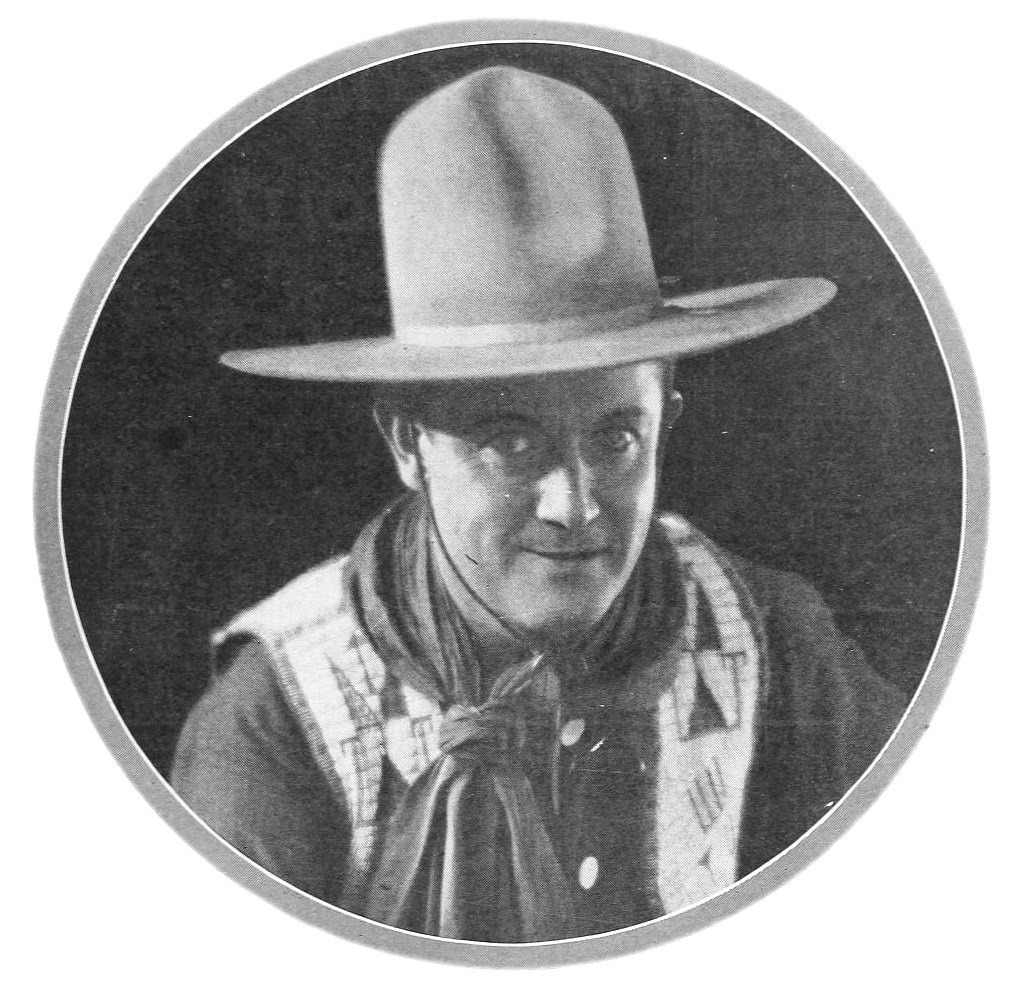
- Bennison as the title character in Speedy Meade (1919)
- Born: October 17, 1884; Oakland, California, U.S.
- Died: June 9, 1929 (aged 44); New York City, New York, U.S.
- Education: University of California, Berkeley
- Occupation: Actor
- Years active: 1914–1927

Louis Bennison (October 17, 1884 – June 9, 1929) was an American stage and silent film actor, known for westerns.

== Biography ==
Bennison was born on October 17, 1884, in Oakland, California. He attended the University of California, Berkeley. Bennison performed in plays such as The Unchastened Woman and Johnny Get Your Gun. In 1912, he was a member of the stock company at the Alcazar Theatre in San Francisco.

He had starring film roles and made his motion picture debut in the silent film Damaged Goods in 1914, other films included Pretty Mrs. Smith (1915), Oh, Johnny! (1918) and as the titular character in Speedy Meade (1919).

In the 1920s, Bennison developed a relationship with married Broadway actress Margaret Lawrence, and on June 9, 1929, he shot and murdered Lawrence in her New York apartment before taking his own life. Police believed Bennison to be drunk at the time.

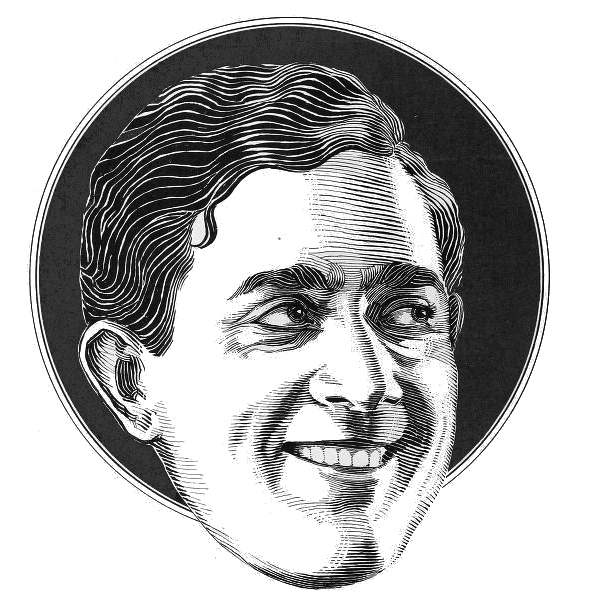
Louis Bennison woodcut c. 1919

== Filmography ==
- Damaged Goods - Dr. Clifford (1914)
- The Keeper of the Flock (1915) (film short)
- Pretty Mrs. Smith - Mr. Smith No. 1, Ferdinand (1915)
- Oh, Johnny! - Johnny Burke (1918)
- Sandy Burke of the U-Bar-U - Sandy Burke (1919)
- Speedy Meade - Speedy Meade (1919)
- The Road Called Straight - Al Boyd (1919)
- High Pockets - 'High Pockets' Henderson (1919)
- A Misfit Earl - Jim Dunn (1919)
- Lavender and Old Lace - Captain Charles Winfield / Carl Winfield (1921)
