= The Patriot and the Spy =

1915 film by Jack Harvey

- Directed by: Jack Harvey
- Starring: James Cruze, Marguerite Snow, and Alphonse Ethier
- Distributed by: Mutual Film
- Release date: 1915
- Running time: 4 reels
- Country: USA
- Language: Silent

The Patriot and the Spy is a 1915 American silent drama film, directed by Jack Harvey. It stars James Cruze, Marguerite Snow, and Alphonse Ethier. Prints and/or fragments were found in the Dawson Film Find in 1978.

== Plot ==
A young couple, Pietro (James Cruze) and Blanchette (Marguerite Snow), get married as a jilted suitor, Johannes (Alphonse Ethier) looks on, and bides his time while plotting revenge. The couple live happily and are overjoyed at two young children they've sired. When Pietro rushes to save one of his children from being hit by a car, he suffers a crushed foot, when the car runs over it. The injury cripples him for life, which makes him ineligible for military service when war is declared. Spurned suitor Johannes enlists, and taunts Pietro for his shortcomings.

Johannes proves to be an excellent military man, and is promoted to sergeant. During a battle Johannes is captured and imprisoned, but then agrees to become a spy for the enemy. When he returns to his village, he brags about his grand exploits, and spins an exciting yarn about how he escaped. When Blanchette continues to reject his romantic overtures, Johannes convinces the enemy to raid the village. Johannes then convinces Pietro to attempt a foolish mission, but leaks the details to the enemy. Pietro is then captured, and sentenced to being hanged. Johannes now taunts Pietro and claims he will have is way with Blanchette. Pietro barely escapes the hanging, and returns home to protect his wife. During the struggle, the enemy troops mistake the outline in the couples home as Pietro, but it is actually Johannes, and he is shot dead. Home troops arrive to save the village, and Pietro is honored as a true patriot.

== Cast ==
- James Cruze as Pietro
- Marguerite Snow as Blanchette
- Alphonse Ethier as Johannes
- Hal Clarendon as (as Kenneth Clarendon)
- Samuel N. Niblack
- Albert L. Reitz (as Al Reitz)
