= Luck and Pluck =

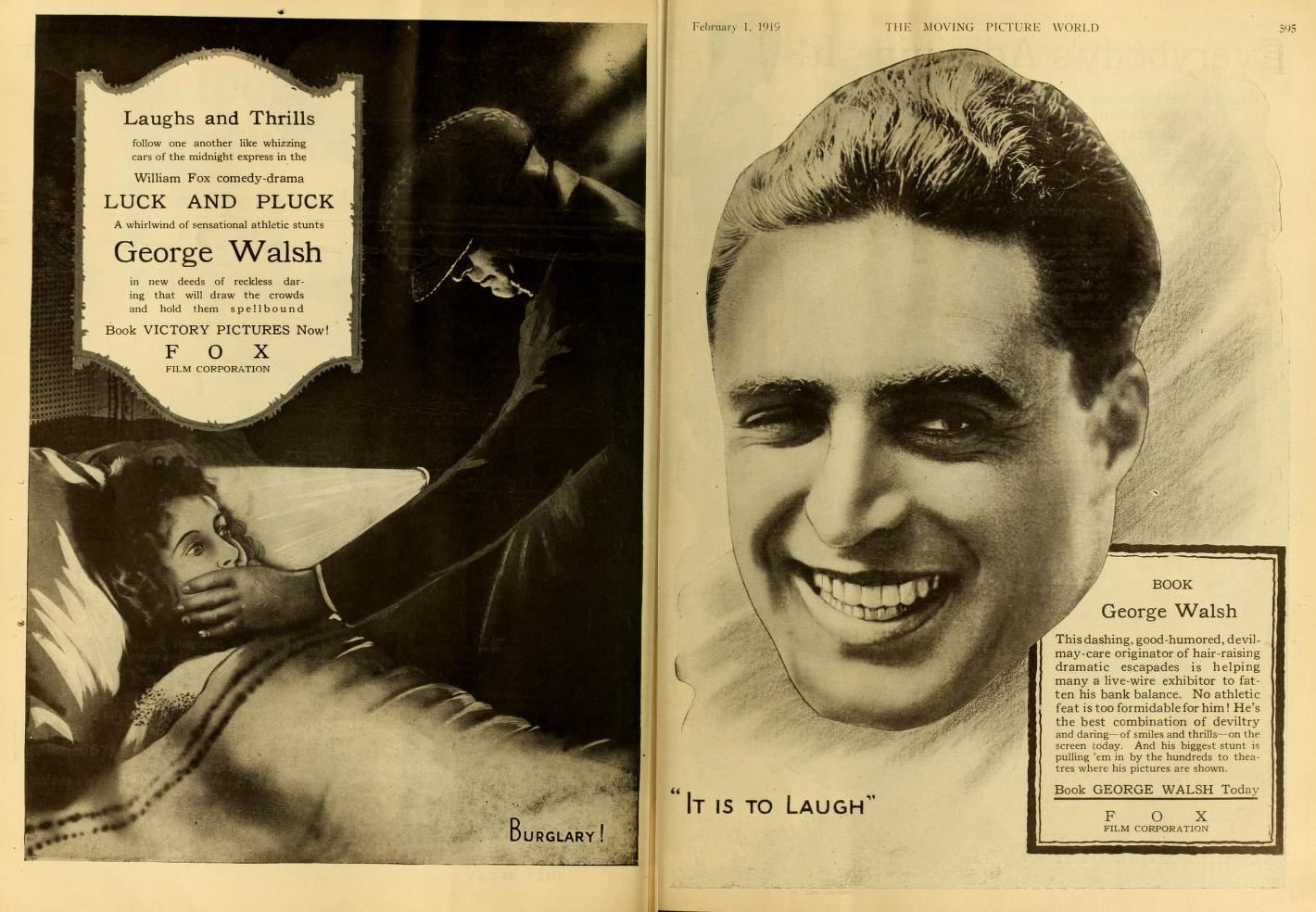
- Advertisement for the film
- Directed by: Edward Dillon
- Screenplay by: Adrian Johnson; Raymond L. Schrock
- Story by: George Scarborough
- Produced by: William Fox
- Starring: George Walsh; Virginia Lee; Joe Smiley; George Fisher
- Production company: Fox Film Corporation
- Distributed by: Fox Film Corporation
- Release date: February 2, 1919
- Running time: 5 reels
- Country: United States
- Language: Silent (English intertitles)

Luck and Pluck is a 1919 drama film directed by Edward Dillon. It was produced and distributed by Fox Film Corporation.

== Plot ==
Joe Grim, alias "Velvet," is content to attend strictly to the business of housebreaking until he rescues a good looking girl in a runaway in Central Park. After that he does his best to steal the girl's heart. Her father is chief of the United States Intelligence Bureau, and her fiance is Karl Richter, a German spy, who belongs to a band that is trying to steal the plans of an aeroplane invented by Professor Slade. Countess Briand, a member of the band, is another supposed friend of the heroine's, and the young girl is taken to her house after the runaway. Joe goes to the home of the countess to steal a photograph of his charmer, believing that she lives there. The countess covers him with a revolver and learns his errand. She tells him that Slade is trying to blackmail his Laura, and has letters belonging to the girl. Joe rushes to Slade's house,. steals the plans in mistake for the letters, and gives them to the countess. When he discovers his mistake he steals the plans.back again and returns them to the halfcrazed inventor. The crook goes on stealing his way through the story to help his love affair, and his quick action is the means of saving Laura and catching the German conspirators when they kidnap the girl. Joe receives his reward by marrying Laura.

== Cast ==
- George Walsh as Joe Grim/Velvet
- Virginia Lee as Laura White
- Joe Smiley as a father
- George Fisher as Karl Richter
- Corrine Uzzell as Countess Briand
- George Halpin as Velvet's valet

== Reception ==
A contemporary article in The Houston Post called the film "one of the strongest human interest stories ever seen on the screen".

A contemporary review in The Moving Picture World praised George Walsh's performance.

== Preservation status ==
According to the National Film Preservation Board, the film is lost.
