= Edward Roseman =

American actor

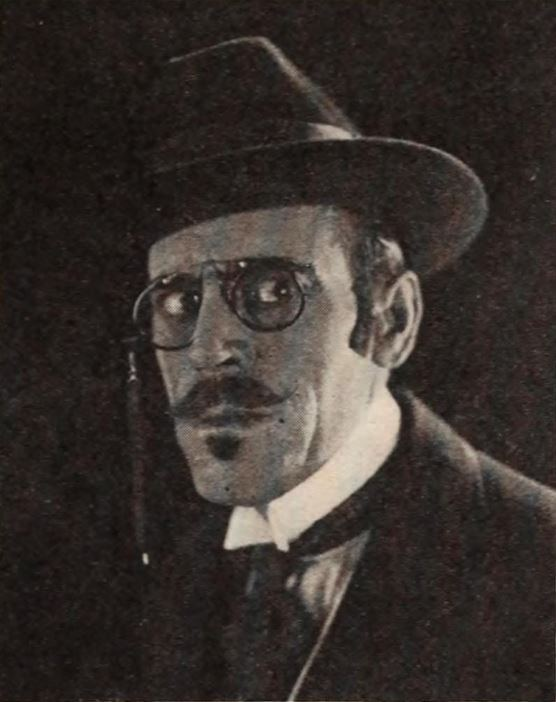
- Edward Roseman in Fantômas (1920)
- Born: Ernest Frederick Roseman; May 14, 1875; Terre Haute, Indiana, U.S.
- Died: September 16, 1957 (aged 82); Syracuse, New York, U.S.
- Occupation: Actor
- Years active: 1913–1929
- Spouse: Sophia Anderson

Edward Roseman (May 14, 1875 – September 16, 1957), sometimes identified as Edward F. Roseman, was an American actor, who worked primarily during the silent film era.

== Biography ==
The son of a pharmacist, Roseman was born in Terre Haute, Indiana, christened Ernest Frederick Roseman. His father died of tuberculosis when he was seven years old so Edward and his two siblings, Jenny May and Henry, were raised in Terre Haute by his mother, Mary Lucinda. As a young adult, Roseman worked on a railroad before succumbing to the lure of vaudeville and traveling theater stock companies, including the Margaret Bird Stock Company and those founded by playwrights Lincoln J. Carter and Wright Lorimer.

Between 1913 and 1921, Roseman was a popular actor in silent films, appearing in about 50 motion pictures during that span. Following his success in the title role of the 1920 Fox Studios horror serial, Fantômas, Roseman usually was featured in a heavy role as a villain. Cast in a part which required him to play multiple personalities, Movie Weekly magazine referred to Roseman as "The Master of Makeup." He was described as "The Man of a Thousand Faces" several years before Lon Chaney Sr. earned that moniker.

Altogether, Roseman appeared in more than 60 silent films. The House of Secrets, released in 1929, was one of his only "talkies." He also appeared on Broadway in the late twenties.

Throughout his film career, Roseman resided in New York City. Most, if not all, of the movies he made were created on the east coast. As film studios relocated to California, Roseman retired and moved, with his wife Sophia and son David, to Syracuse, New York.

He died on 16 September 1957, at age 82, after a year's illness, and is buried at Morningside Cemetery in Syracuse.

== Partial filmography ==
- When Broadway Was a Trail (1914)
- All for a Girl (1915) as Briggs
- The Pride of the Clan (1917)
- The Tiger Woman (1917)
- The Barrier (1917)
- The Secret of Eve (1917)
- The Red Woman (1917)
- The Blue Streak (1917)
- The Slave (1917)
- The Wasp (1918)
- Oh, Johnny! (1918)
- The Embarrassment of Riches (1918)
- Calibre 38 (1919)
- High Pockets (1919)
- Speedy Meade (1919)
- A Scream in the Night (1919)
- The Face at Your Window (1920)
- Fantômas (1920)
- Anne of Little Smoky (1921)
- Tangled Trails (1921)
- The Broken Violin (1923)
- The Devil's Partner (1923)
- On the Banks of the Wabash (1923)
- Greater Than Marriage (1924)
- Who's Cheating? (1924)
- Fear-Bound (1925)
- The Police Patrol (1925)
- The Wives of the Prophet (1926)
- Running Wild (1927)
- The Crimson Flash (1927)
- The Masked Menace (1927)
- Mark of the Frog (1928)
- The House of Secrets (1929)
