= Speedy Meade =

1919 film

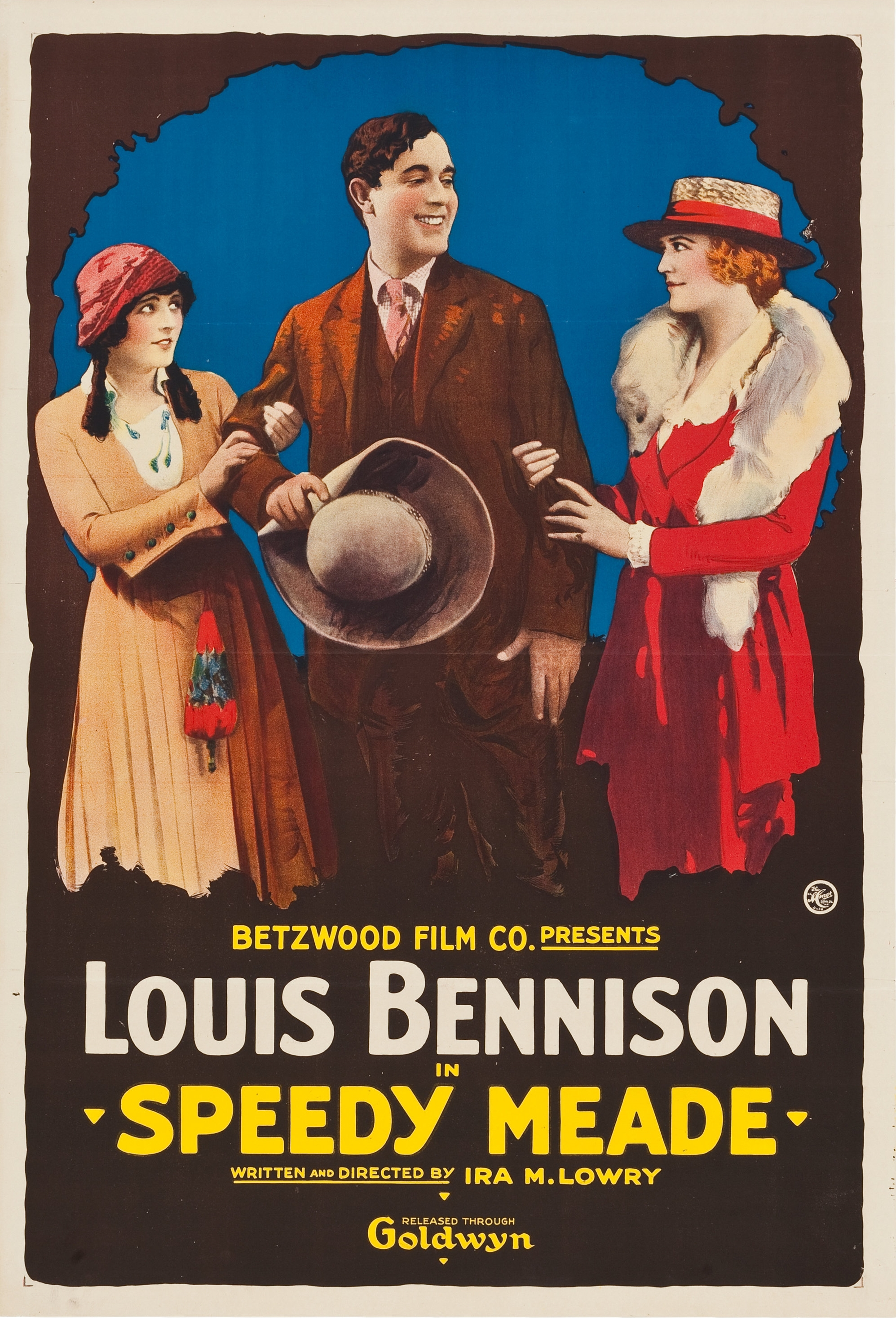
- Theatrical release poster
- Directed by: Ira M. Lowry
- Written by: Ira M. Lowry
- Starring: Louis Bennison; Katherine MacDonald; Neil Moran; Claire Adams; Norman Jefferies
- Cinematography: David Calcagni
- Production company: Betzwood Film Company
- Distributed by: Goldwyn Pictures
- Release date: March 23, 1919
- Running time: 5 reels
- Country: United States
- Languages: Silent; English intertitles

Speedy Meade is a 1919 American silent Western film directed by Ira M. Lowry and starring Louis Bennison, Katherine MacDonald, Neil Moran, Claire Adams, and Norman Jefferies. The film was released by Goldwyn Pictures on March 23, 1919.

== Cast ==
- Louis Bennison as Speedy Meade
- Katherine MacDonald as Mary Dillman
- Neil Moran as Robert Bridges
- Claire Adams as Alice Hall
- Norman Jefferies as Bud Lester
- Edward Roseman as Buck Lennon
- Ricca Allen as Mrs. Buck Lennon
- William Bailey as Cal Merchant

== Preservation ==
The film is now considered lost.
