= William Black (actor) =

American actor

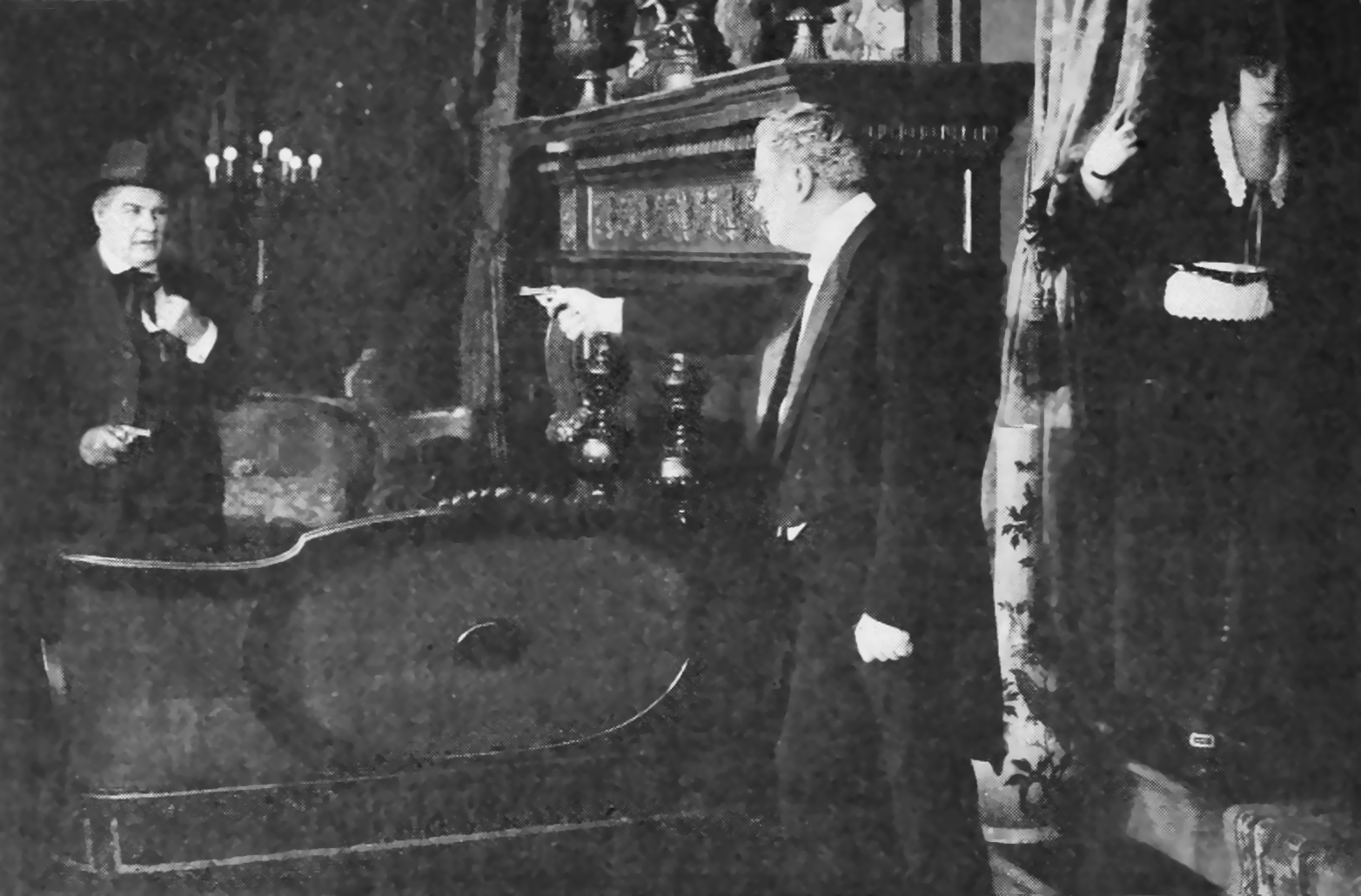
- Black (center) in serial The Fatal Fortune (1919)
- Born: 1871; Irvington, New York, U.S.
- Occupation: Actor

William Black (1871 – date of death unknown) was an American Broadway and film actor. He appeared on Broadway in 10 productions from 1899 to 1931 and in 39 films from 1916 to 1941. He also appeared under the names Bill Black, William Wallace Black, William W. Black, and W. W. Black.

== Broadway ==
Black was born in Irvington, New York in 1871. He appeared in his first Broadway production, a revival of an opera by Jacques Offenbach called La Belle Hélène, in 1899. He went on to appear in eight other productions through 1910, including three mountings of His Honor the Mayor, a musical comedy in 1906 and 1907, and a production of Little Nemo, in which he received star billing. His final stage appearance on Broadway was 21 years later in 1931 in a farce titled Company's Coming, which ran for only eight performances.

- La Belle Hélène (opera revival) as Ajax I (1899)
- The Wild Rose (musical comedy) as Count von Lahn, Scipio (1902)
- George W. Lederer's Mid-Summer Night Fancies' (1903)
  - "The Darling of the Gallery Gods" (musical comedy) as Tan Sun
  - "The Dress Parade" (musical comedy) as Mr. Pickwick
- The Southerners (musical comedy) as Colonel Maximilian Easy (1904)
- His Honor the Mayor (musical comedy) as "Reddy" Samson, a cowboy (1906, 1907, 1907)
- Little Nemo (musical comedy) as Morpheus (1908–09)
- The Deacon and the Lady (musical) as Jim Gruff (1910)
- Company's Coming (farce) as Mr. Patterson (1931)

== Films ==
At the time that Black was initially appearing on Broadway, the American film industry was centered in the New York metropolitan area. Black's first film appearance was in 1916 in a film titled Vanity. He worked consistently, generally playing small parts, through 1919 and into the early 1920s. By the mid-20s, his film appearances were few, with two films in 1924, two in 1926, and then two in 1930. His next film appearance was in 1935, followed by two uncredited appearances in 1938 and 1941, when he was in Hello, Sucker in a bit part.

=== Partial filmography ===
- Ambition (1916)
- Great Expectations (1917)
- The New York Peacock (1917)
- A Magdalene of the Hills (1917)
- The Greatest Power (1917)
- The Trail of the Shadow (1917)
- The Guardian (1917)
- The Floor Below (1918)
- The Prussian Cur (1918)
- The Hell Cat (1918)
- High Pockets (1919)
- Three Green Eyes (1919)
- The Hidden Truth (1919)
- The Rider of the King Log (1921)
- The Wakefield Case (1921)
- That Woman (1922)
- The Steadfast Heart (1923)
- Big Brother (1923)
- Ramshackle House (1924)
- Fascinating Youth (1926)
- The Broadway Boob (1926)
- The Golf Specialist (1930 short - W.C. Fields' first sound film
- Life Returns (1935)
- Hello, Sucker (1941)
