= The Police Patrol =

1925 silent film

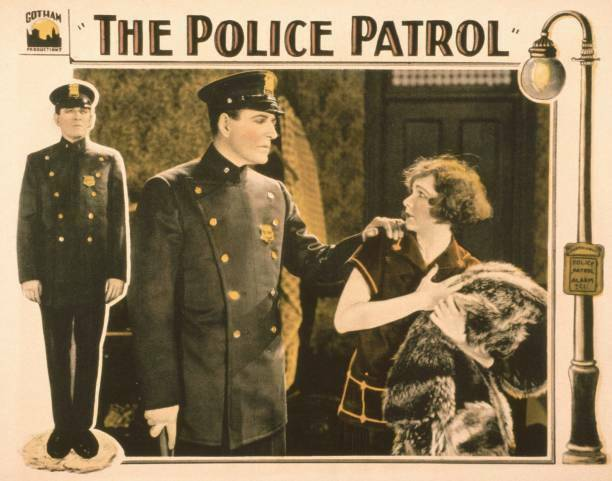
- Directed by: Burton L. King
- Written by: Victoria Moore; A.Y. Pearson
- Produced by: Lon Young
- Starring: James Kirkwood; Edna Murphy; Edmund Breese
- Cinematography: John W. Brown; Charles J. Davis
- Production company: Gotham Pictures
- Distributed by: Lumas Film Corporation
- Release date: August 28, 1925
- Running time: 60 minutes
- Country: United States
- Languages: Silent; English intertitles

The Police Patrol is a 1925 American silent crime film directed by Burton L. King and starring James Kirkwood, Edna Murphy and Edmund Breese.

== Plot ==
A patrolman falls in love with a dressmaker, is ordered to arrest her when a doppelganger commits a series of robberies. He instead sets out to find the guilty woman.

== Cast ==
- James Kirkwood as Officer Jim Ryan
- Edna Murphy as Alice Bennett / Dorothy Stone
- Edmund Breese as Tony Rocco
- Bradley Barker as Maurice Ramon
- Frank Evans as Buddy Bennett
- Joseph W. Smiley as Lieutenant Burke
- Robert McKim as Maurice Ramon
- Blanche Craig as Nora Mullen
- Edward Roseman as Chicago Charley
- Tammany Young as The Crasher
- Charles Craig as Perkins
- James Laffey as Inspector Regan
- Monya Andre as Mlle. Semononff

== Bibliography ==
- Munden, Kenneth White. The American Film Institute Catalog of Motion Pictures Produced in the United States, Part 1. University of California Press, 1997.
