= Ormi Hawley =

American actress

Ormetta Hawley
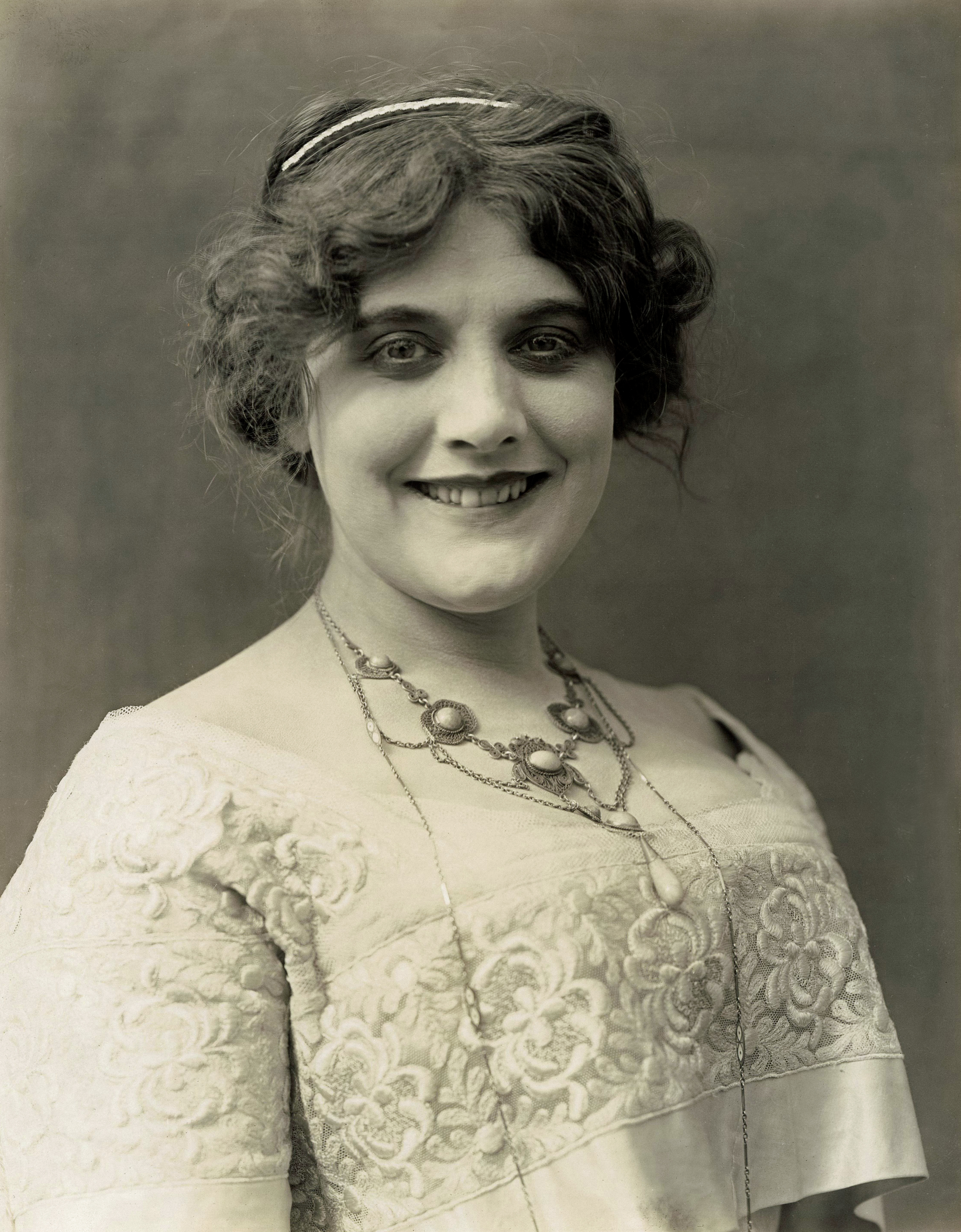
- Ormi Hawley, ca. 1912
- Born: Ormetta Grace Hawley; Holyoke, Massachusetts
- Died: June 3, 1942; Rome, New York

Ormetta Grace Hawley (February 21, 1889, Holyoke, Massachusetts—June 3, 1942, Rome, New York) was an American actress.

Hawley attended the New England Conservatory of Music. She began her acting career in live theatre with a stock theater company in Boston before turning to the new silent film industry in 1911 with Lubin Studios in Philadelphia, Pennsylvania.

Over her short film career she reportedly appeared in more than three hundred motion pictures, a large number of which would have been short films. She made her last film in 1919.

Hawley was married to Charles Fulcher, with whom she operated a farm near Camden, New York, for the last 15 years of her life. She also painted portraits and wrote stories for children. She died in a hospital in Rome, New York, on June 3, 1942.

== Selected filmography ==
- Twixt Love and Ambition (1912)
- Where Love Leads (1916)
- The Antics of Ann (1917)
- Runaway Romany (1917)
- The Ordeal of Rosetta (1918)
- Mrs. Dane's Defense (1918)
- The Road Called Straight (1919)
- The Splendid Romance (1919)
- The Unwritten Code (1919)
