= The Hell Cat (1918 film) =

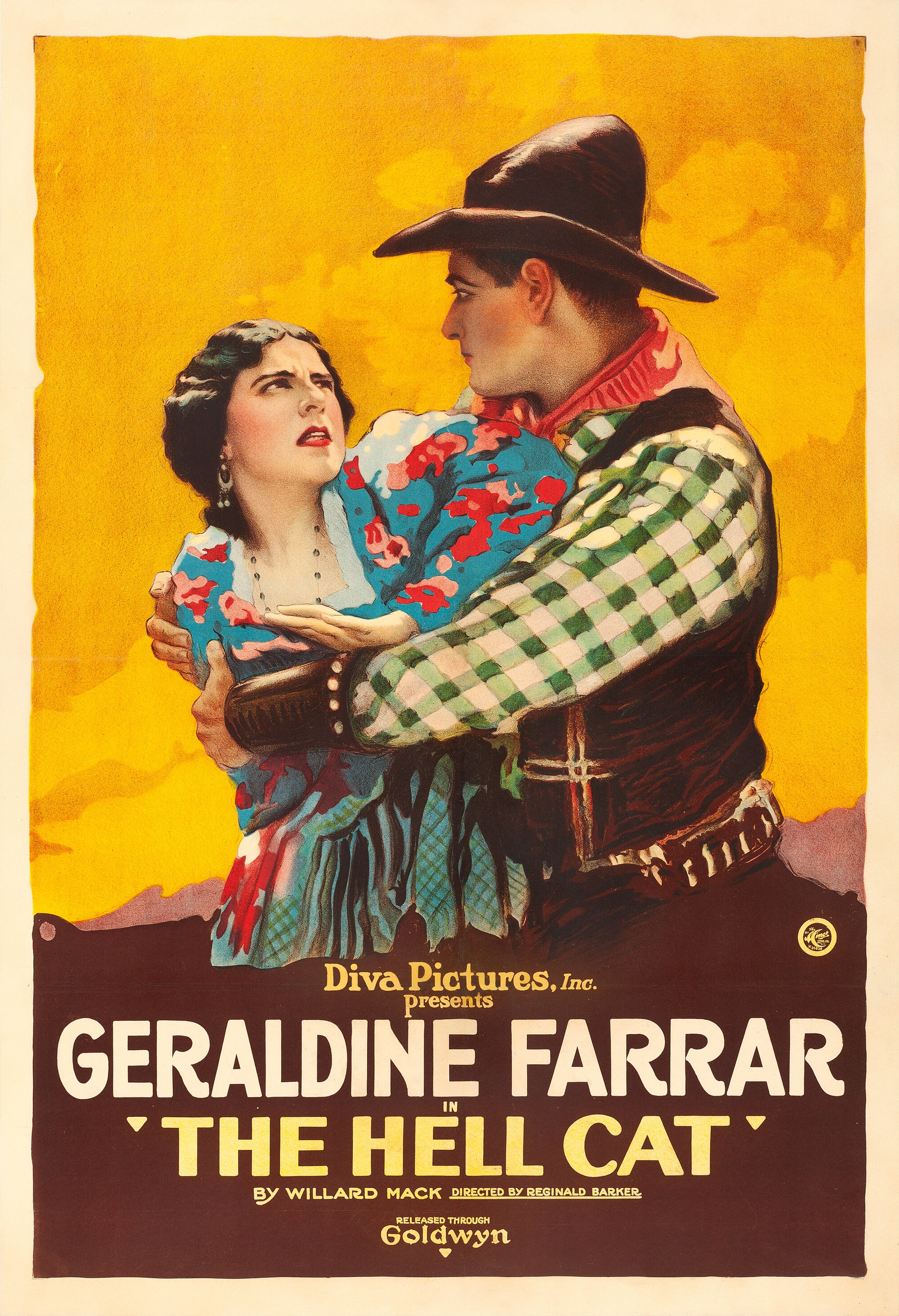
- Theatrical release poster
- Directed by: Reginald Barker
- Written by: Willard Mack
- Produced by: Samuel Goldwyn
- Starring: Geraldine Farrar; Tom Santschi; Milton Sills
- Cinematography: Percy Hilburn (fr); William Laub
- Production company: Diva Pictures
- Distributed by: Goldwyn Pictures
- Release date: December 1, 1918
- Running time: 6 reels
- Country: United States
- Languages: Silent; English intertitles

The Hell Cat is a 1918 American silent Western film produced and distributed by Goldwyn Pictures. Reginald Barker directed and Geraldine Farrar starred. It is not known whether the film currently survives.

== Plot ==
As described in a film magazine, half Irish and Spanish Pancha (Farrar), who has gained the sobriquet the Hell Cat, lives with her father (Black), a sheep rancher. Jim Dyke (Santchi), a cattleman, has sex with her and she spurns him. Her father then finds his sheep with their throats cut, and Sheriff Jack Webb (Sills) takes the case. The sheriff suspects Dyke, but lacks sufficient evidence to make a case. Finally, in a drunken rage, Dyke and his cowboys raid the O'Brian home and destroy it by fire, killing the father and one of his hands. Pancha, plotting to escape, consents to wed Dyke and they head for town. En route she stabs and kills him. The sheriff appears, and assumes the blame for Dyke's death, thus allowing for him and Pancha to marry.

== Cast ==
- Geraldine Farrar as Pancha O'Brien
- Tom Santschi as Jim Dyke
- Milton Sills as Sheriff Jack Webb
- William Black as Pancha's Father (credited as William W. Black)
- Evelyn Axzell as Wan-o-mee
- Clarence Williams
- George James Hopkins (credited as George Hopkins)
- Clarence Snyder
- Raymond Wallace
- Monte Jarrett
- Pete Nordquist
- Jimmy Tuff
- Dudley Smith
- Charlie Black
- Bryan Wangoman

uncredited

- Texas Guinan

== Censorship ==
Like many American films of the time, The Hell Cat was subject to restrictions and cuts by city and state film censorship boards. For example, the Chicago Board of Censors required a cut, in Reel 2, of the intertitle "Wan-o-mee lured from her tribe", Reel 4, the shooting of Pancha's father, in scene where a man points at the Indian woman insert a new intertitle "When you draw in your claws, you little spitfire, Wan-o-mee will untie you. You can't vamoose, so you might as well go to bed", Jim Dyke throwing young woman from him and locking the door on her, the man unlocking the door and young woman coming out, scene of Wan-o-mee opening door to Dyke's room, Reel 5, three bedroom scenes in which young woman covers face and registers guilt of her misconduct, second and third scene of the young woman on the ladder where she registers guilt to include scene where she looks at ring and shakes her head, all scenes of the young woman in underwear in the room until Dyke comes in and warns her of the sheriff's approach, the intertitle "I'll go, but don't lay a finger on me till I say so", Reel 6, young woman covering her face in shame, and two scenes with a man looking at the young woman and expressing realization of her shame.
