= Smoke Bellew =

1929 film

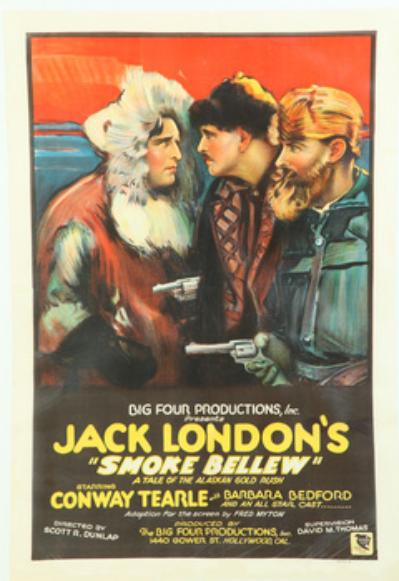
- Directed by: Scott R. Dunlap
- Written by: Jack London (stories); Fred Myton
- Starring: Conway Tearle; Barbara Bedford; Alphonse Ethier
- Cinematography: J. O. Taylor
- Edited by: Charles J. Hunt
- Production company: Big Four Productions
- Distributed by: First Division Pictures
- Release date: January 25, 1929
- Running time: 65 minutes
- Country: United States
- Languages: Silent; English intertitles

Smoke Bellew is a 1929 American silent Western film directed by Scott R. Dunlap and starring Conway Tearle, Barbara Bedford and Alphonse Ethier. It is based on the 1912 short story collection Smoke Bellew. A complete copy of this film with French subtitles exists at the Paris Archive.

== Cast ==
- Conway Tearle as Kit 'Smoke' Bellew
- Barbara Bedford as Joy Gastell
- Mark Hamilton as Jack Short
- Alphonse Ethier as Harry Sprague
- William Scott as Stine
- Alaska Jack as Prospector
- J. P. Lockney as Caribou Charlie Gastell

== Bibliography ==
- Langman, Larry. A Guide to Silent Westerns. Greenwood Publishing Group, 1992.
