= The Unwritten Code (1919 film) =

1919 silent film

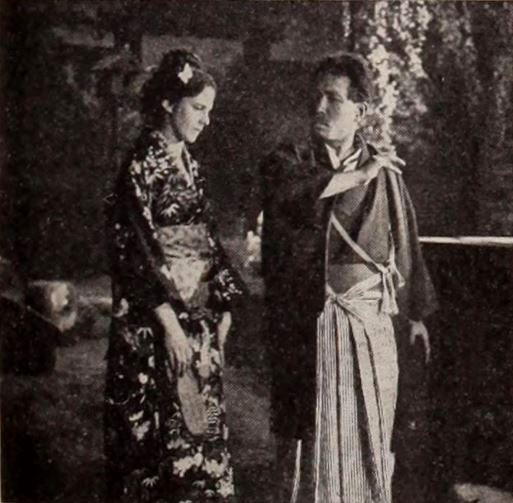
- Film still
- Directed by: Bernard J. Durning
- Written by: Bernard J. Durning; L.W. McChesney
- Starring: Shirley Mason; Ormi Hawley; Matt Moore
- Production company: Edison Studios
- Distributed by: World Film
- Release date: May 19, 1919
- Running time: 50 minutes
- Country: United States
- Language: Silent (English intertitles)

The Unwritten Code is a 1919 American silent drama film directed by Bernard J. Durning and starring Shirley Mason, Ormi Hawley, and Matt Moore. The art director Cedric Gibbons designed the film's sets, while William A. Wellman worked as an assistant director.

== Main cast ==
- Shirley Mason as Kiru-San
- Ormi Hawley as Margaret
- Matt Moore as Dick Tower
- Frank O'Connor as Thompson
- T. Tamamoto as Kimura (credited as Thomas Tomamoto)
- F. Wada as Okuma
- Mr. Oskima
- Wanda Hawley

== Production ==
The film had several working titles including Aliens, Weaver of Dreams, and The Wall Invisible.

== Bibliography ==
- Robert B. Connelly. The Silents: Silent Feature Films, 1910-36, Volume 40, Issue 2. December Press, 1998.
