= Harriet MacGibbon =

American actress (1905–1987)

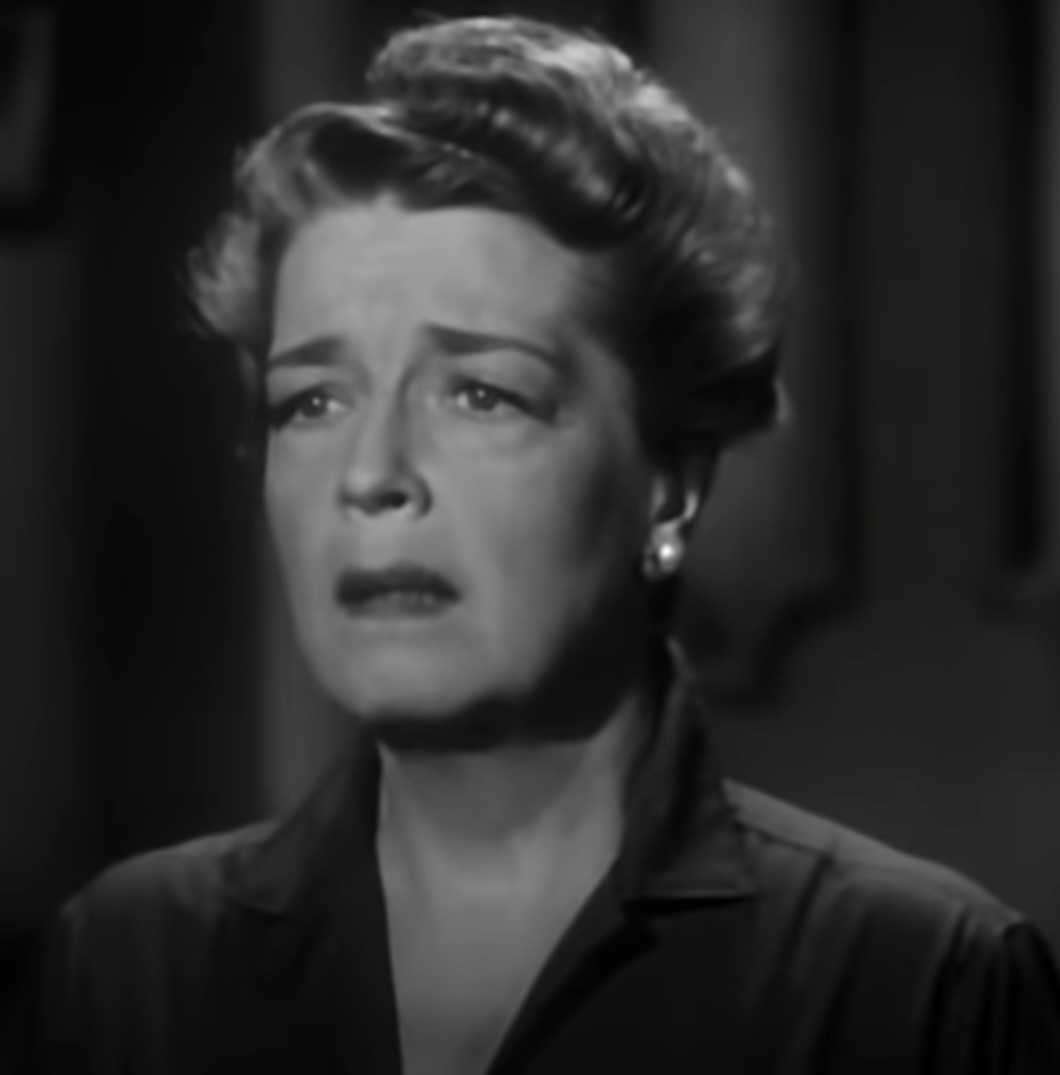
- MacGibbon in Man with a Camera (1959)
- Born: Harriet Elizabeth MacGibbon; October 5, 1905; Chicago, Illinois, U.S.
- Died: February 8, 1987 (aged 81); Beverly Hills, California, U.S.
- Resting place: Forest Lawn Memorial Park, Hollywood Hills, California, U.S.
- Education: American Academy of Dramatic Arts
- Occupation: Actress
- Years active: 1925–1987
- Spouse(s): William Reno Kane (1930-1942); Charles Corwin White (1942-1967)
- Children: 1

Harriet Elizabeth MacGibbon (October 5, 1905 – February 8, 1987) was an American film, stage and television actress best known for her role as the insufferably snobbish, "blue-blooded Bostonian" Mrs. Margaret Drysdale in the sitcom The Beverly Hillbillies.

== Career ==
MacGibbon joined the stock company of Edward Clarke Lilley at Akron, Ohio. She then went to San Francisco and played leading roles for Henry Duffy. In Louisville, Kentucky, she acted with Wilton Lackaye, Edmund Breese, William Faversham, Tom Wise and Nance O'Neil. Credits included Ned McCobb's Daughter, The Front Page, and a "transcontinental tour" of Max Marcin's The Big Fight (in which she starred opposite former world heavyweight champion Jack Dempsey), beginning in Boston, taking in New Haven and Hartford, Connecticut, and ending at Caine's storehouse in Los Angeles.

She had a long and distinguished career on the Broadway stage, beginning in 1925 at the age of 19 when she acted in the play Beggar on Horseback at the Shubert Theatre. In the late 1930s, she did You Can't Take It With You, the Pulitzer Prize-winning comedy, at the Biltmore Theatre in Los Angeles. From 1934 to 1937, MacGibbon portrayed Lucy Kent on the NBC radio soap opera Home Sweet Home.

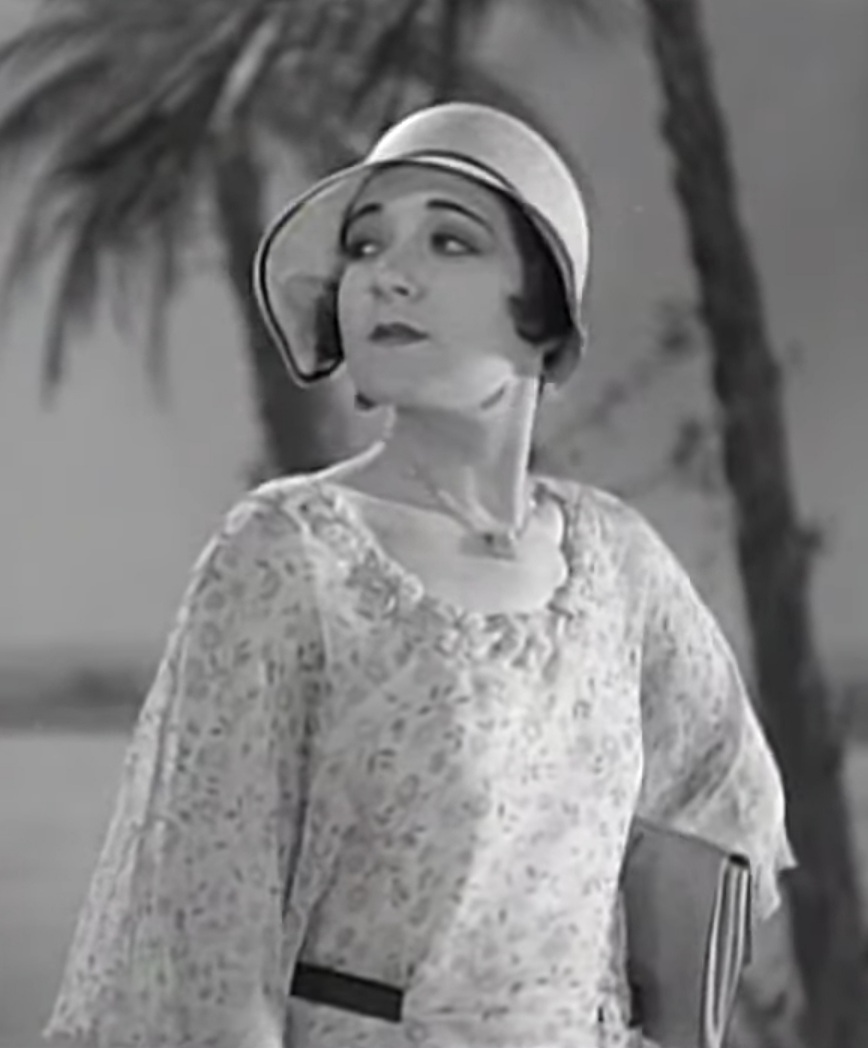
MacGibbon in The Golf Specialist (1930)

Her film debut was a non-speaking bit as a snooty woman walking a dog across a golf course in W.C. Fields' The Golf Specialist (1930), shot in Fort Lee, New Jersey. She made numerous guest appearances on television starting in 1950, including Bewitched, Ray Milland's sitcom Meet Mr. McNutley. Another sitcom in which MacGibbon appeared was My Three Sons, performing as Margaret Cunningham in the 1961 episode "Bub Goes to School". She was cast in five theatrical movies, including Four Horsemen of the Apocalypse (1962), which was directed by Vincente Minnelli and starred Glenn Ford, Ingrid Thulin, Charles Boyer, and Lee J. Cobb.

== Personal life and death ==
MacGibbon married at least twice: in September 1930 to producer William Reno Kane of Philadelphia, from whom she obtained a divorce in April 1942, at which time she married writer Charles Corwin White. They remained married until White's death in 1967, on Christmas Day. She had one child by her first marriage, a son, William MacGibbon Kane, who was born in 1933 and died in 1977, predeceasing his mother.

Harriet MacGibbon died at age 81. She was cremated, and her ashes interred in niche 61046 in the Columbarium of Remembrance at Forest Lawn Memorial Park (Hollywood Hills), Los Angeles, California.

== Filmography ==
Year	Title	Role	Notes
1930	The Golf Specialist	Snooty woman walking dog	short, bit part, uncredited
1961	Cry for Happy	Mrs. Bennett	
1961	The Absent Minded Professor	Wedding guest	uncredited
1961	All in a Night's Work	Dowager	uncredited
1962	A Majority of One	Mrs. Putnam	
1962	Four Horsemen of the Apocalypse	Dona Luisa Desnoyers	
1963	Son of Flubber	Mrs. Edna Daggett	
1965	Fluffy	Mrs. Claridge	

=== TV filmography ===
- Dragnet 1967 Season 1 Episode 6 (1967) as Flobelle Mirada
- The Wacky Zoo of Morgan City (1970) as Mrs. Westerfield
- The Judge and Jake Wyler (1972) as hostess
- The Best Place to Be (1979)

=== TV series – regular ===
- Golden Windows (1954) as Mrs. Brandon (credited as Harriet McGibbon)
- Hazel (1961) as Mother Baxter
- The Beverly Hillbillies (1962–1969) as Mrs. Margaret Drysdale
- The Smothers Brothers Show (1965) as Mrs. Costello
