= Sandy Burke of the U-Bar-U =

1919 film

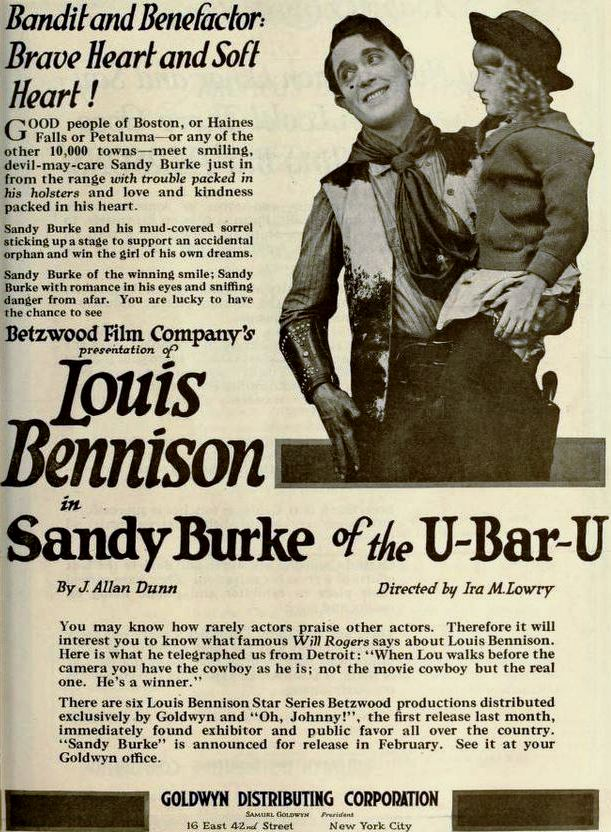
- Advertisement for Sandy Burke of the U-Bar-U on page 419 of the Moving Picture World (January 25, 1919)
- Directed by: Ira M. Lowry
- Story by: J. Allan Dunn
- Starring: Louis Bennison; Virginia Lee; Alphonse Ethier; H.H. Pattee; Echlin Gayer; Lucy Beaumont
- Cinematography: David Calcagni
- Production company: Betzwood Film Company
- Distributed by: Goldwyn Pictures
- Release date: February 23, 1919
- Running time: 5 reels
- Country: United States
- Languages: Silent; English intertitles

Sandy Burke of the U-Bar-U is a 1919 American silent Western film directed by Ira M. Lowry and starring Louis Bennison, Virginia Lee, Alphonse Ethier, H.H. Pattee, Echlin Gayer, and Lucy Beaumont. The film was released by Goldwyn Pictures on February 23, 1919.

== Cast ==
- Louis Bennison as Sandy Burke
- Virginia Lee as Molly Kirby
- Alphonse Ethier as Jim Diggs
- H.H. Pattee as Jeff Kirby
- Echlin Gayer as Honorable Cyril Harcourt Stammers
- Lucy Beaumont as Widow Mackey
- Wilson Bayley as Sheriff Quinlan
- Nadia Gary as Dolly Morgan
- Phil Sanford as Lafe Hinton (as Philip Sanford)

== Preservation ==
A print of Sandy Burke of the U-Bar-U survives at the Library of Congress.
