= The Woman in White (1912 film) =

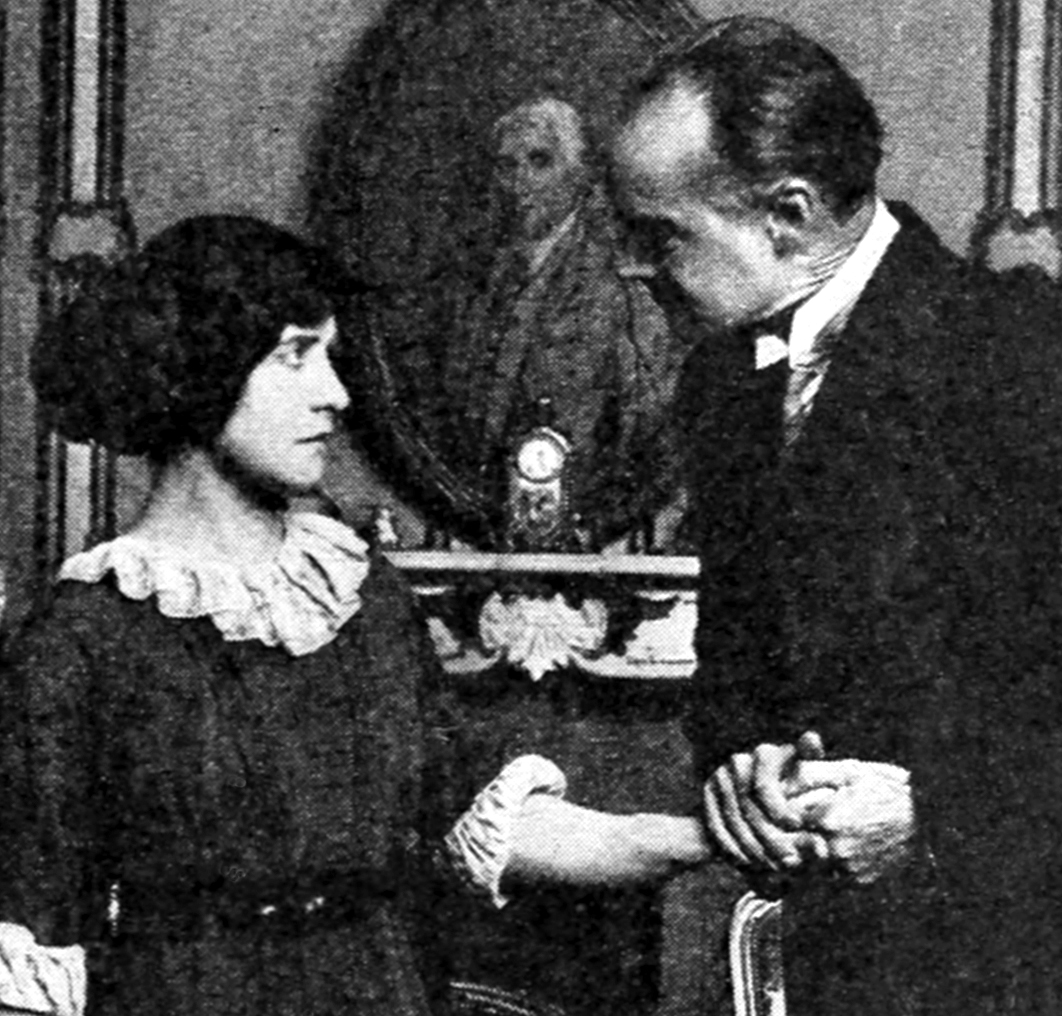
- Engagement of Laura (Janet Salisbury) and Sir Percival (Charles Craig)
- Directed by: George Nichols
- Screenplay by: George Edwardes Hall
- Based on: The Woman in White; 1860 novel by Wilkie Collins
- Produced by: Vitagraph Company of America
- Starring: Janet Salisbury; Charles Perley; Charles Craig
- Production company: Gem Motion Picture Company
- Release date: October 22, 1912 (US)
- Running time: Two reels
- Country: United States

The Woman in White is a 1912 American short silent film based on the 1860 novel of the same name by Wilkie Collins, produced by the Gem Motion Picture Company. Unlike a second film adaptation of The Woman in White produced by the Thanhouser Company the same year, it is not a lost film; a copy is preserved at the George Eastman Museum in Rochester, New York.

The Thanhouser version was one of the silent films destroyed when their initial studio burned in 1913.

== Production ==
=== Gem Motion Picture Company ===
Directed by George Nichols, The Woman in White was produced by Gem, a subsidiary of the newly formed Universal Film Manufacturing Company and released on October 22, 1912.

The cast included;

- Janet Salisbury (Laura Fairlie and The Woman in White)
- Charles Perley (Walter),
- Charles Craig (Percival)
- Alec Frank (Fosco)
- Viola Alberti (Countess Fosco)
- Lyman Rabbe (Pesca)

The story was adapted by George Edwardes Hall.

=== Thanhouser Company production ===
Simultaneously, the Thanhouser Company was producing its own two-reel adaptation of The Woman in White, the cast included;

- Marguerite Snow (Laura, Anne)
- James Cruze (Percival)
- William Garwood (Walter)

The screenplay was written by Lloyd F. Lonergan. Release dates were announced to the press and changed several times as the two companies competed for the first release. In the end, Thanhouser was able to deliver its film on October 20, 1912—two days before Gem.

== Gallery ==
A summary of the plot of The Woman in White appeared in the November 1912 issue of The Motion Picture Story Magazine, accompanied by six still photographs from the Gem production. The photographs are captioned as they appear in the magazine.

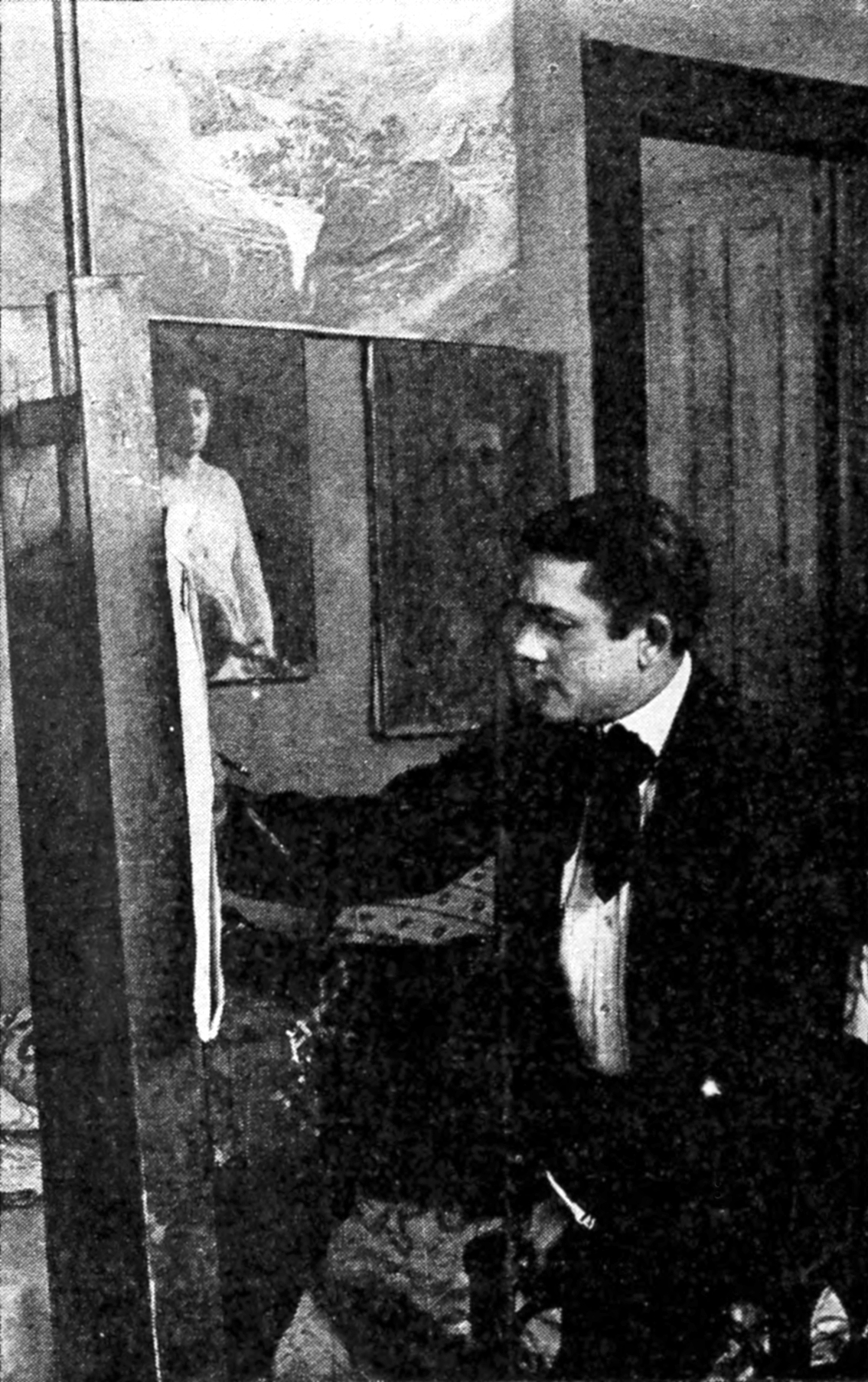
Walter Hartridge, Artist

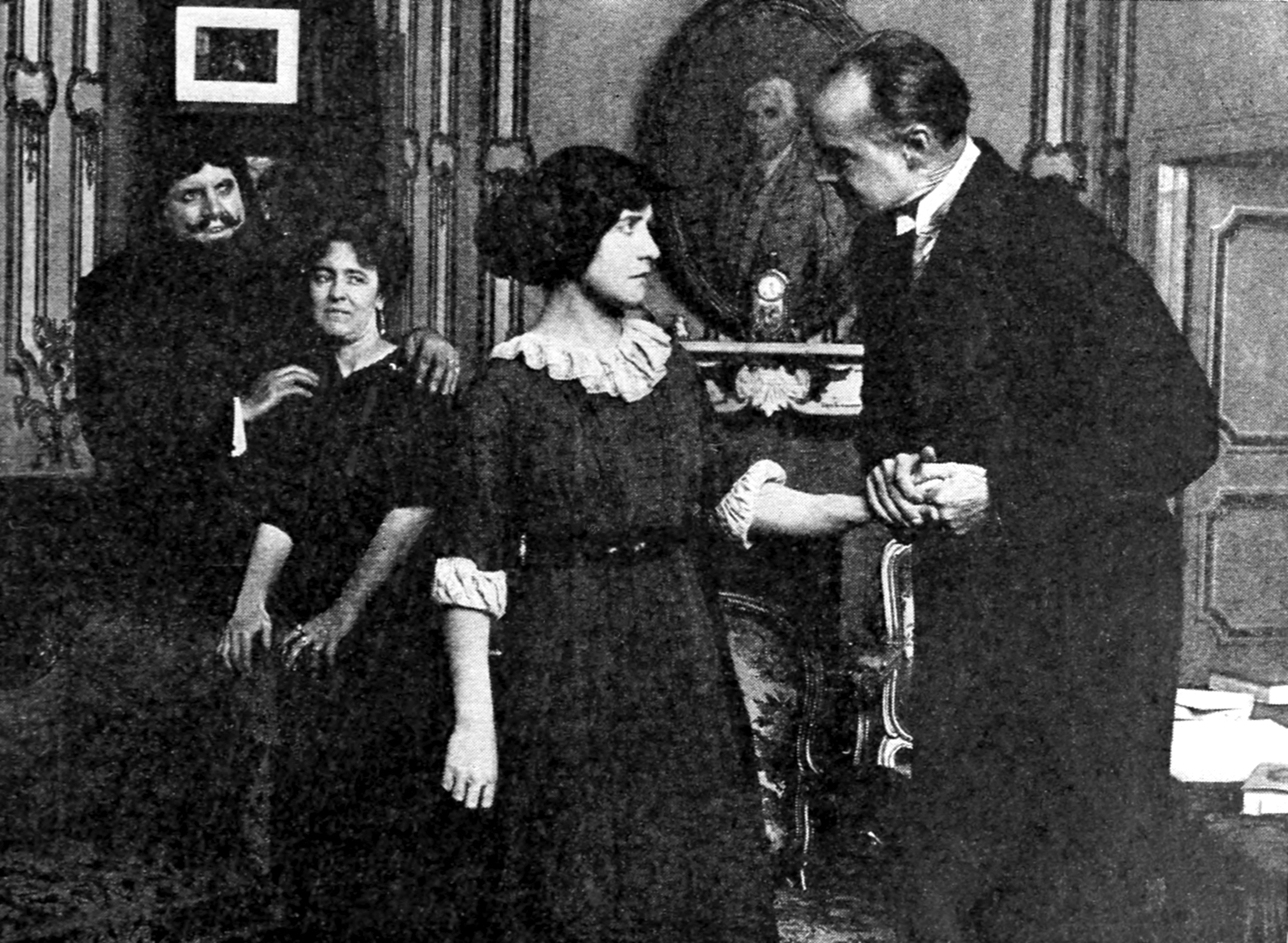
The Engagement

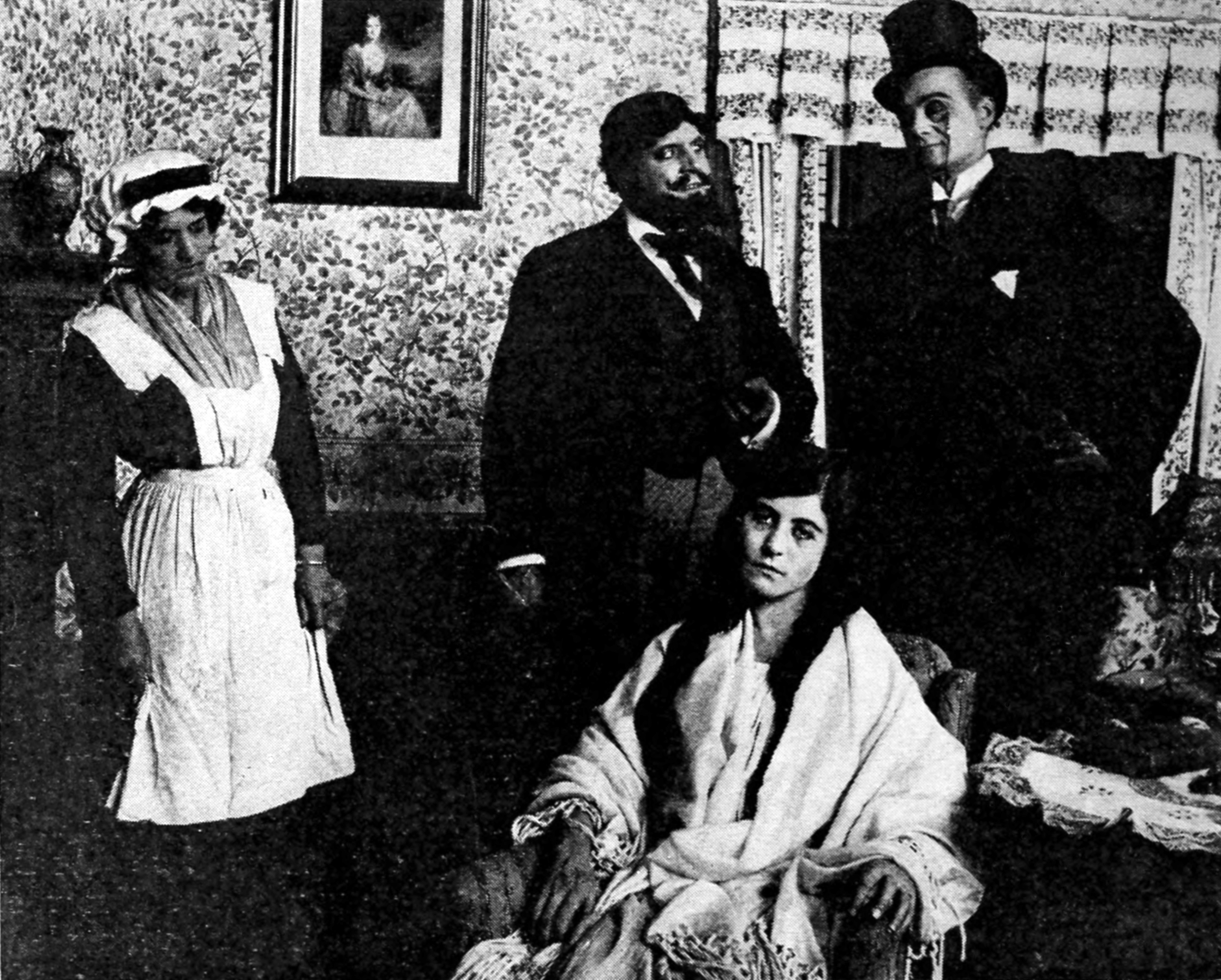
The Conspiracy

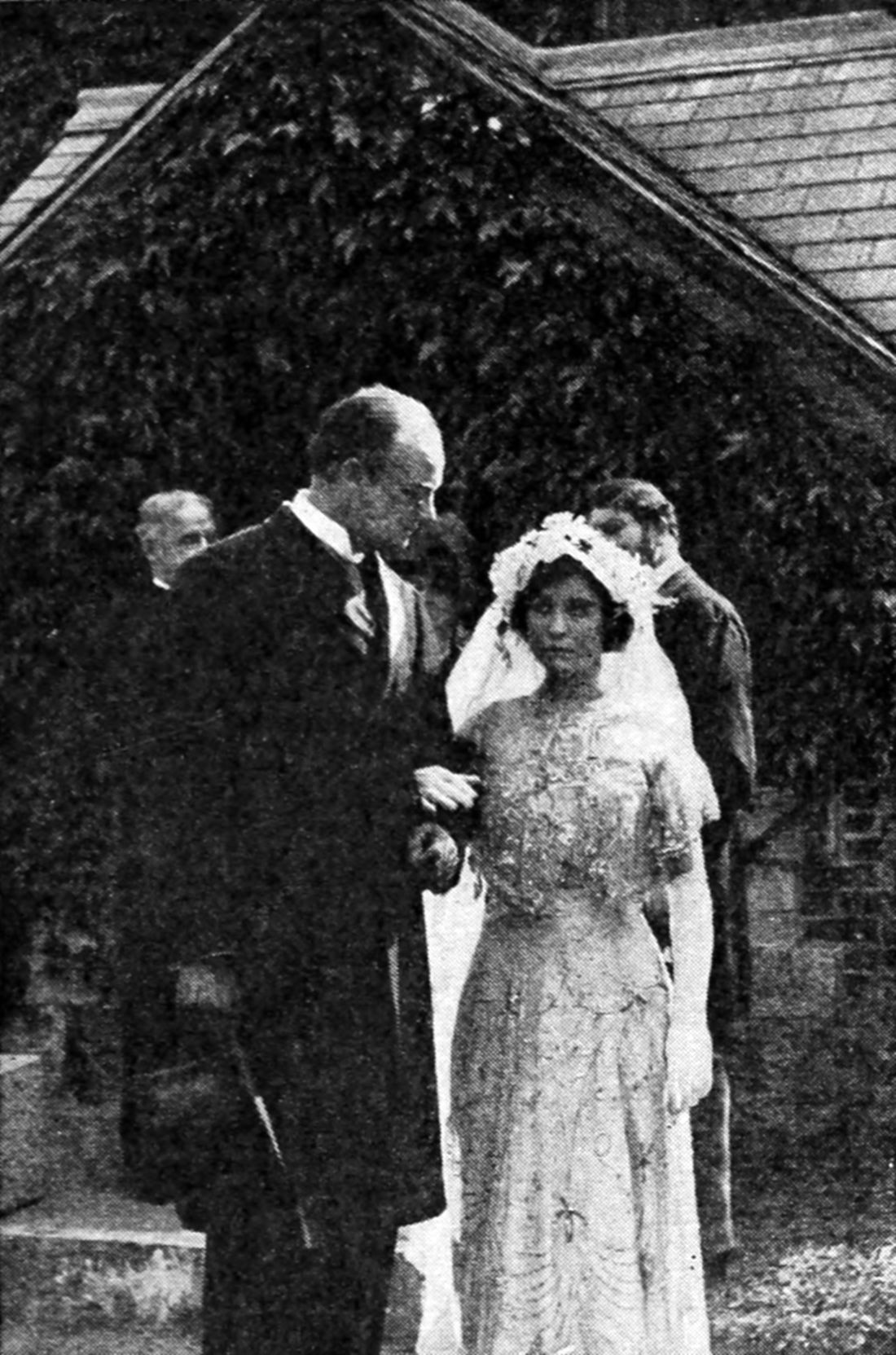
The Wedding

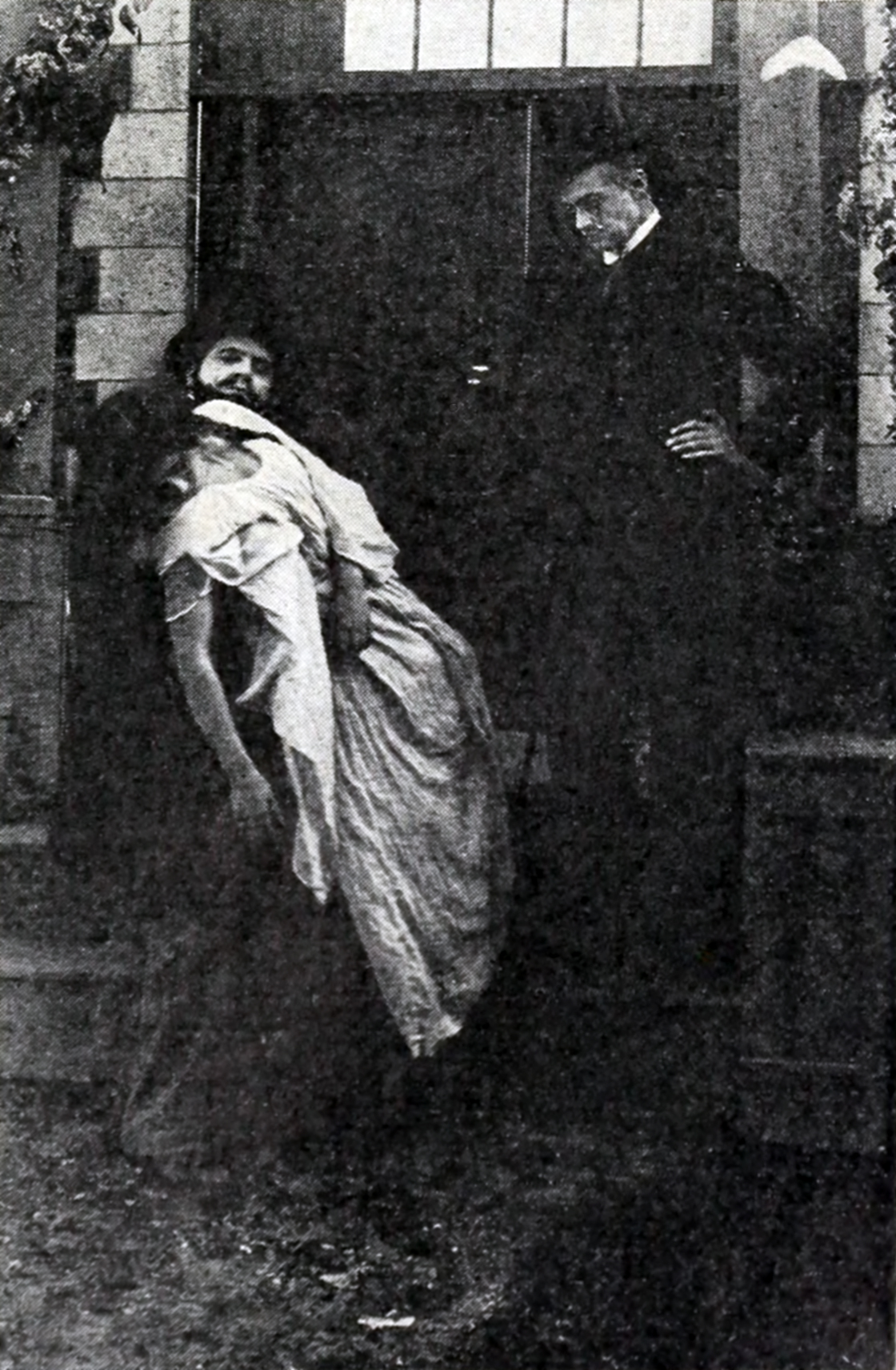
The Abduction

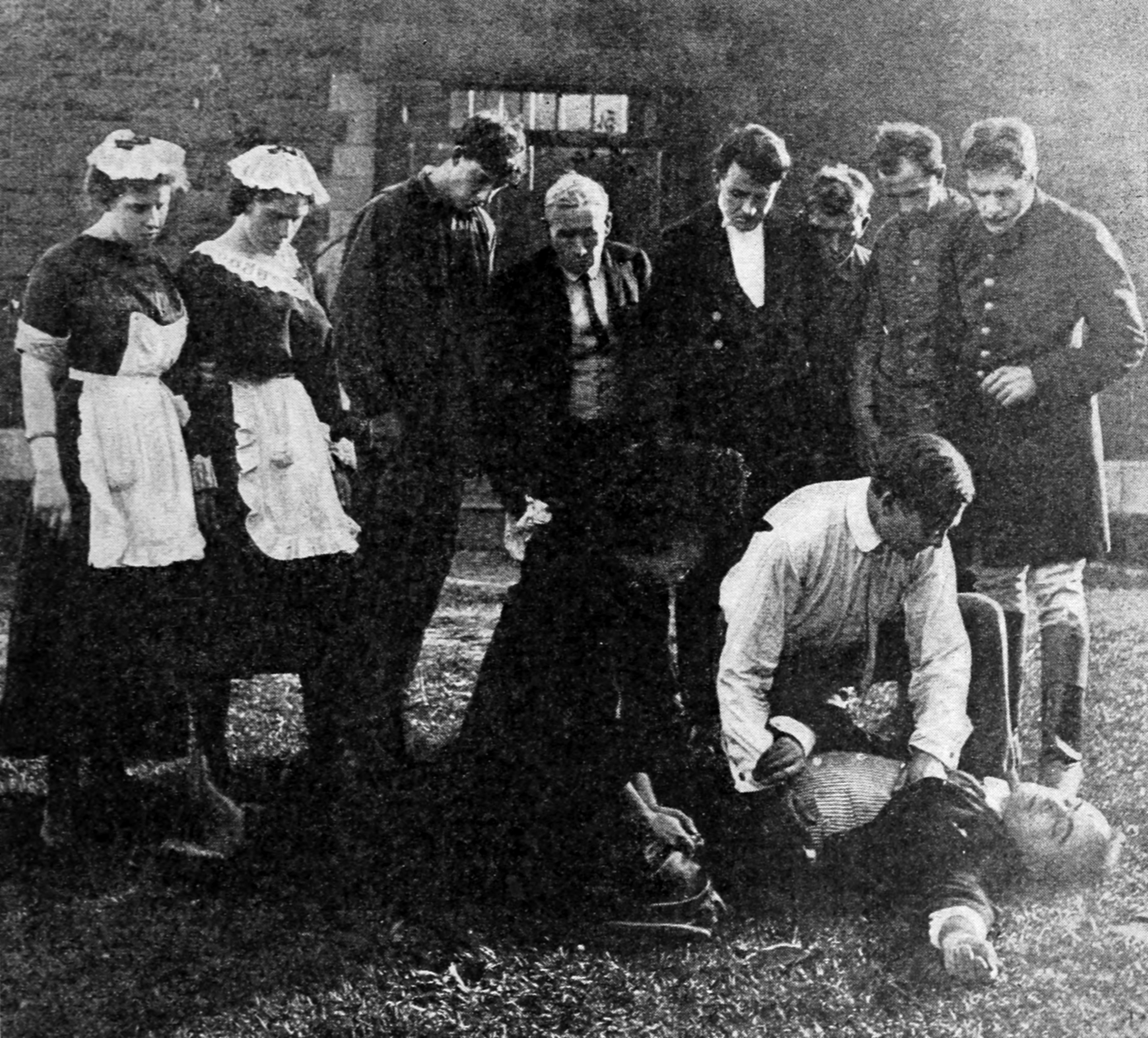
The Death of Sir Percival
