= High Pockets (film) =

1919 film

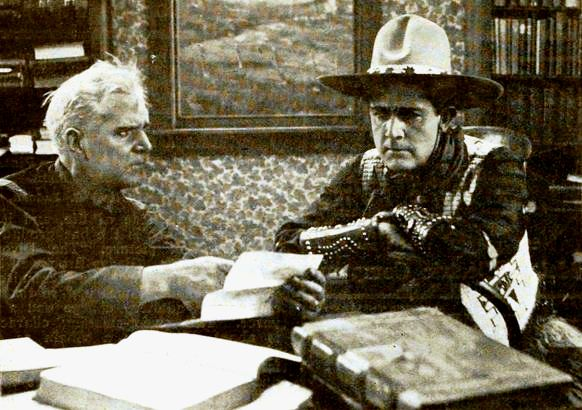
- Still of High Pockets with an unidentified actor and Louis Bennison
- Directed by: Ira M. Lowry
- Written by: Adrian Gil-Spear (scenario)
- Based on: High Pockets by William Patterson White
- Starring: Louis Bennison; Katherine MacDonald; William Black; Frank Evans; Edward Roseman
- Cinematography: David Calcagni
- Production company: Betzwood Film Company
- Distributed by: Goldwyn Pictures
- Release date: August 15, 1919
- Running time: 5 reels
- Country: United States
- Languages: Silent; English intertitles

High Pockets is a 1919 American silent Western film directed by Ira M. Lowry and starring Louis Bennison, Katherine MacDonald, William Black, Frank Evans, and Edward Roseman. It is based on a novel of the same name by William Patterson White. The film was released by Goldwyn Pictures on August 15, 1919.

== Cast ==
- Louis Bennison as 'High Pockets' Henderson
- Katherine MacDonald as Joy Blythe
- William Black as Jim Stute
- Frank Evans as Bull Bellows
- Edward Roseman as Max Manon
- Francis Joyner as Tony
- Sam J. Ryan as Mike Flynn (as Sam Ryan)
- Neil Moran as Henry Allison

== Preservation ==
A print of High Pockets survives at the Museum of Modern Art.
