= Running Wild (1927 film) =

1927 film

- Film poster
- Directed by: Gregory La Cava
- Written by: Gregory La Cava (original screen story); Roy Briant (scenario & intertitles)
- Produced by: Adolph Zukor; Jesse L. Lasky; Gregory La Cava; William Le Baron; Carl Laemmle, Jr.
- Starring: W. C. Fields
- Cinematography: Paul C. Vogel
- Edited by: Ralph Block
- Distributed by: Paramount Pictures
- Release date: June 11, 1927
- Running time: 65 minutes
- Country: United States
- Language: Silent (English intertitles)

Running Wild is a 1927 American silent comedy film built around the unique talents of its star, W. C. Fields. The movie was filmed at Paramount Studios - 5555 Melrose Avenue, Hollywood, Los Angeles, California, USA.

== Plot ==
Elmer Finch is a timid and fearful man, constantly browbeaten by his domineering wife, harassed by his stepchildren, and intimidated by his employer. His daily life is marked by submission and anxiety, even in the face of the family dog.

One day, on his way to work, he finds a horseshoe and tosses it over his shoulder, accidentally shattering a jeweler’s storefront window. Pursued by the police, he escapes by stumbling into a vaudeville act where he is hypnotized. Under hypnosis, he transforms into a fearless man, embodying the courage of a lion.

With his newfound confidence, he returns to work and turns the tables on those who have oppressed him for years. He successfully collects a long-overdue debt from a notorious miser, asserts himself before the board of directors, and effortlessly secures a lucrative $15,000 contract. Empowered by his transformation, he then heads home, finally standing up to his wife and stepchildren, reclaiming his rightful position as the head of the household.

== Cast ==
- W. C. Fields as Elmer Finch
- Mary Brian as Elizabeth
- Marie Shotwell as Mrs. Finch
- Claude Buchanan as Dave Harvey
- Frederick Burton as Mr. Harvey
- Barnett Raskin as Junior
- Frank Evans as Amos Barker
- Edward Roseman as Arvo, the Hypnotist

== Preservation status ==
The film was directed by Gregory La Cava and is preserved at the Library of Congress. It also received, along with several other Paramount titles, wide distribution on VHS tape in 1987 in celebration of Paramount's 75th anniversary. A restored version of the film was released on Blu-ray by Kino in 2018.
