= Twixt Love and Ambition =

- Produced by: Siegmund Lubin
- Starring: Edwin August; Ormi Hawley
- Distributed by: General Film Company
- Release date: December 5, 1912
- Running time: 1 reel
- Country: USA

Twixt Love and Ambition is a 1912 silent film short produced by the Lubin Manufacturing Company and distributed by General Film Company. It starred Edwin August and actress Ormi Hawley.

This film is preserved in the Library of Congress collection.

== Cast ==
- Edwin August - John Sterne
- Ormi Hawley - Marie Wayne
- Buster Johnson - Dan, John's Nephew and Ward
- Jane Gail - Dan's Mother
