= Lela Bliss =

American actress (1896–1980)

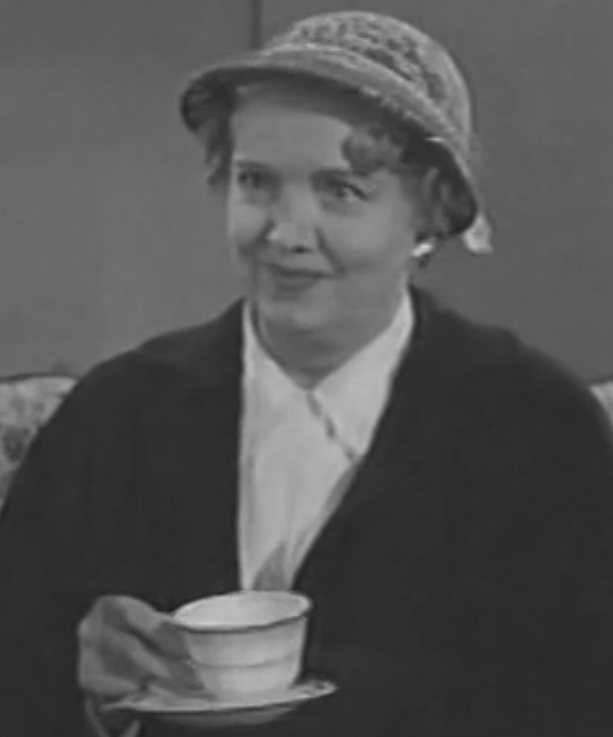
- Bliss in The Life of Riley (1954)
- Born: May 11, 1896; Los Angeles, California, U.S.
- Died: May 15, 1980 (aged 84); Los Angeles, California, U.S.
- Other name: Leila Bliss
- Occupation: Actress
- Years active: 1915–1967
- Spouse: Harry Hayden (m. 1924; died 1955)
- Children: 1

Lela Bliss (May 11, 1896 – May 15, 1980) was an American actress. She made her first silent film, Pretty Mrs. Smith, in 1915 and appeared in over 40 movies until the 1960s.

== Career ==
Bliss appeared in supporting roles and bit parts in Hollywood films such as The Dark Mirror (1946), Miracle on 34th Street (1947) and Intruder in the Dust (1949). She often played mothers, neighbours or society women. From the 1950s on, she also appeared frequently on popular television shows including My Little Margie (as Trixie Wilson, the mother of Margie's boyfriend, in the 1952 episode "Vern's Chums"), The Twilight Zone, Maverick, Mister Ed and The Addams Family. She ended her acting career with a guest role in That Girl in 1967.

== Personal life and death ==
Bliss was married to Canadian actor Harry Hayden from 1924 until his death on July 24, 1955. They had one child. They ran the Bliss-Hayden School of Acting at 254 South Robertson Boulevard in Beverly Hills, where their students included Veronica Lake, Mamie Van Doren and Betty White. In 1954, the school was acquired by Douglas Frank Bank and Jay Manford and became the Beverly Hills Playhouse, one of the oldest acting schools and theatres in Los Angeles. She died in Los Ángeles, California, in 1980, at the age of 84.

== Partial filmography ==
- Pretty Mrs. Smith (1915)
- The Loves of Letty (1916)
- Hitch Hike to Heaven (1939)
- Since You Went Away (1944)
- The Dark Mirror (1946)
- Gas House Kids Go West (1947)
- Miracle on 34th Street (1947)
- The Snake Pit (1948)
- Intruder in the Dust (1949)
- To Please a Lady (1950)
- Ghost Chasers (1951)
- Army Bound (1952)
- Auntie Mame (1958)
- Pepe (1960)
