= Charles Craig (actor) =

American actor

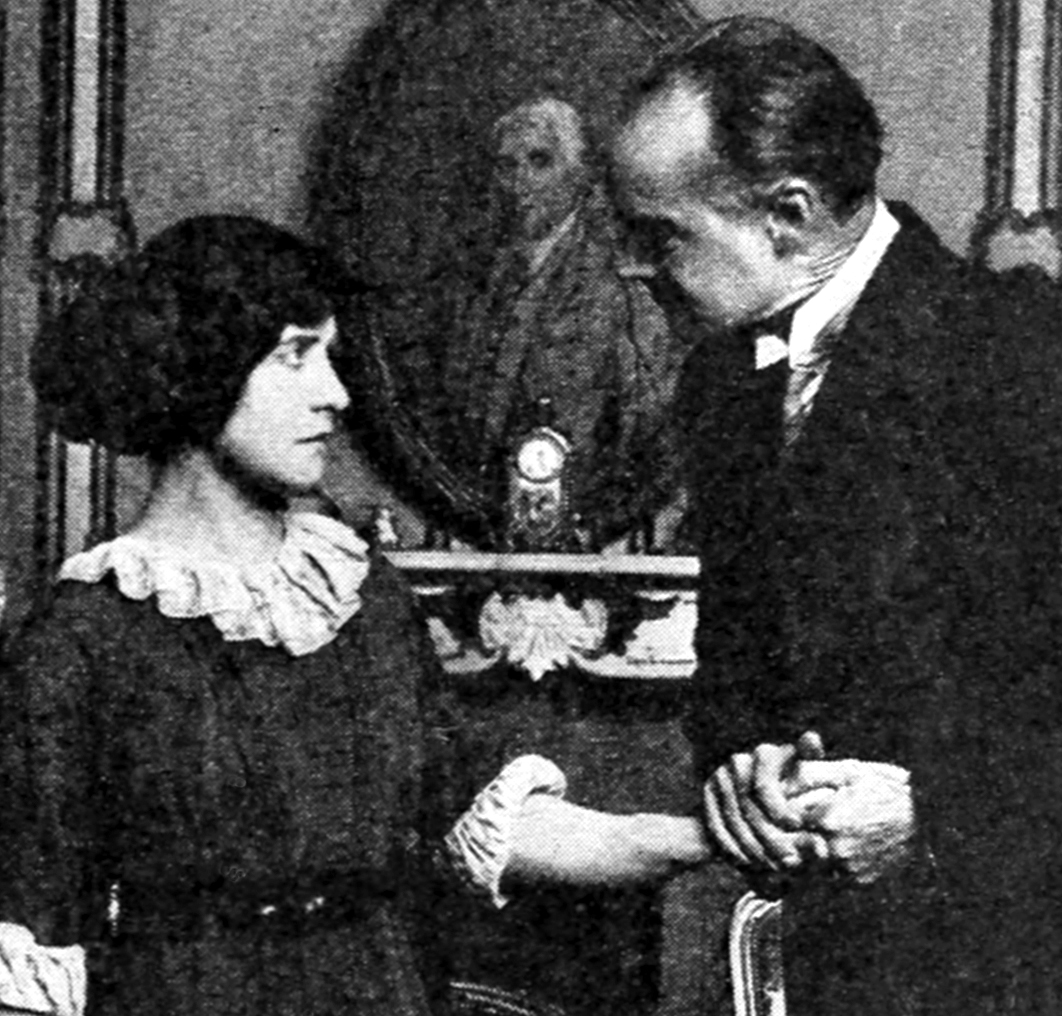
Craig with Janet Salisbury in The Woman in White (1912)

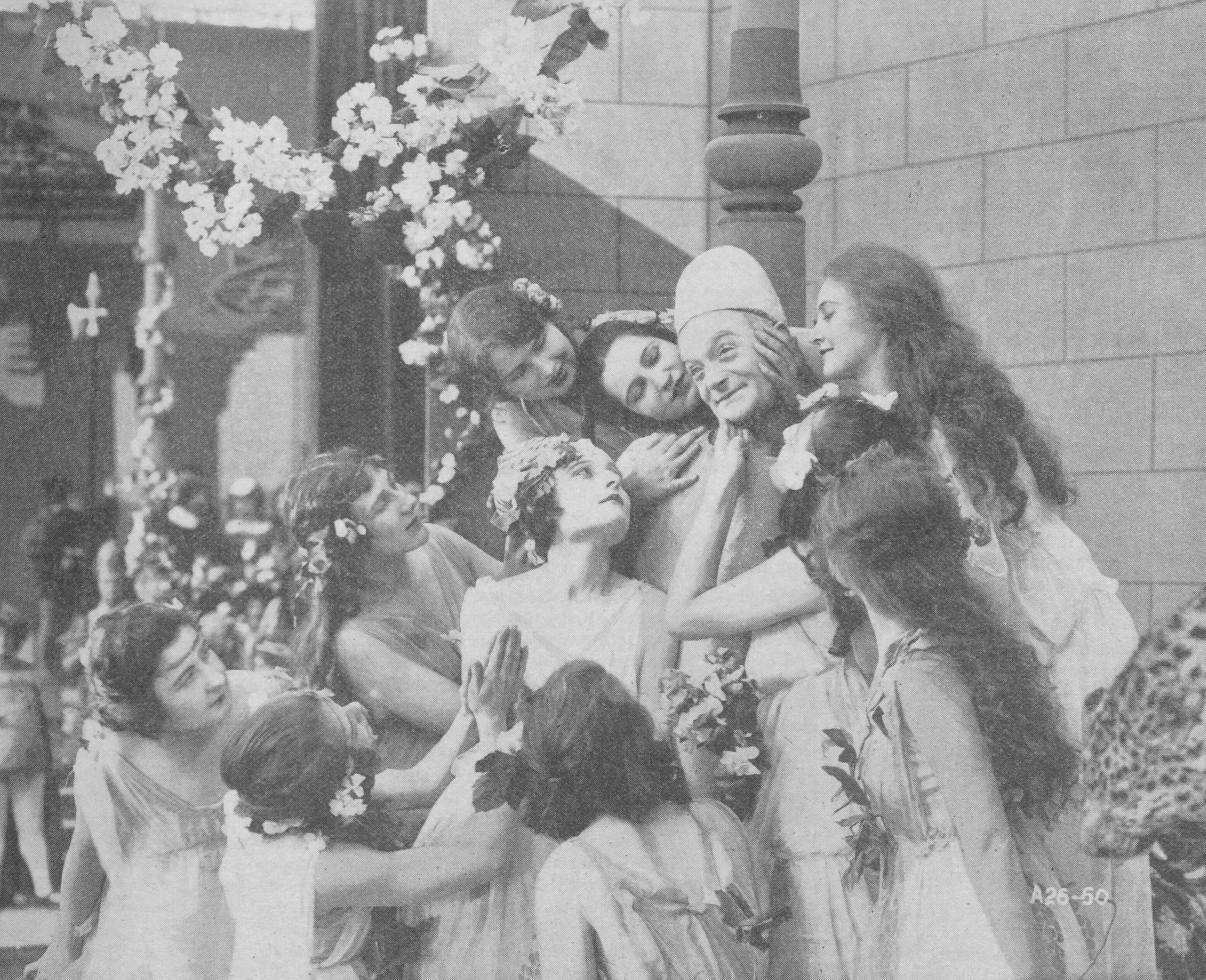
Craig as Sugar, surrounded by a bevy of beauties, in The Blue Bird, a 1918 film of a Maurice Maeterlinck play.

Charles Craig (August 13, 1877 – May 1972) was an American actor. He appeared in 120 films between 1909 and 1931, including a series of comedies with Cissy Fitzgerald. His first film, To Save Her Soul (1909), starred Mary Pickford. He moved to California to work with D. W. Griffith there.

== Selected filmography ==
- To Save Her Soul (1909)
- The Woman from Mellon's (1910)
- The Lucky Toothache (1910)
- Winning Back His Love (1910)
- The Woman in White (1912)
- The House Party (1915)
- Curing Cissy (1915)
- Cissy's Innocent Wink (1915)
- Cissy's Prescription (1916)
- Where Love Leads (1916)
- The Poor Little Rich Girl (1917)
- A Royal Romance (1917)
- The Fall of the Romanoffs (1917)
- A Rich Man's Plaything (1917)
- The Blue Bird (1918)
- The Uphill Path (1918)
- The Sporting Life (1918)
- Under the Greenwood Tree (1918)
- Three Men and a Girl (1919)
- My Lady's Garter (1919)
- The Firing Line (1919)
- Sadie Love (1919)
- The Tower of Jewels (1919)
- Youthful Folly (1920)
- A Fool and His Money (1920)
- The Flapper (1920)
- Nothing But the Truth (1920)
- The Wonder Man (1920)
- At the Stage Door (1921)
- A Divorce of Convenience (1921)
- The Last Door (1921)
- Back Pay (1922)
- The Blonde Vampire (1922)
- Beyond the Rainbow (1922)
- The Madness of Love (1922)
- Marriage Morals (1923)
- One Million in Jewels (1923)
- The Truth About Women (1924)
- The Police Patrol (1925)
- Hell-Bent for Frisco (1931)
