= Ira M. Lowry =

Ira M. Lowry

Ira Morrell Lowry (September 10, 1888 – July 31, 1951) was an American silent film director and producer. The son-in-law of film pioneer Siegmund Lubin, Lowry was general manager of the Lubin Manufacturing Company. Lowry was born in Philadelphia, where he attended Central High School and later Pennington Seminary in New Jersey.

His directorial work includes:

- For the Freedom of the World (1917)
- For the Freedom of the East (1918)
- Oh, Johnny! (1918)
- A Misfit Earl (1919)
- High Pockets (1919)
- The Road Called Straight (1919)
- Speedy Meade (1919)
- Sandy Burke of the U-Bar-U (1919)

In 1948 he organized Veritas Pictures, Inc. which was to produce a film about the life of St. Francis of Assisi. He died in Los Angeles on July 31, 1951.
