= Frank Evans (actor) =

American actor (1849-1934)

Frank Evans (c. 1849 – March 11, 1934) was an American actor. He appeared in 170 films between 1908 and 1927.

== Selected filmography ==
- The Vaquero's Vow (1908)
- Nursing a Viper (1909)
- The Woman from Mellon's (1910)
- A Mohawk's Way (1910) as Trapper
- The Modern Prodigal (1910) as guard
- Swords and Hearts (1911)
- The Goddess of Sagebrush Gulch (1912)
- The Musketeers of Pig Alley (1912)
- Won by a Fish (1912)
- One Is Business, the Other Crime (1912)
- The Narrow Road (1912)
- Fate (1913)
- The Yaqui Cur (1913)
- The Woman in Black (1914)
- Her Maternal Right (1916)
- The World's Great Snare (1916)
- The Argyle Case (1917)
- Oh, Johnny! (1918)
- High Pockets (1919)
- The Flaming Clue (1920)
- The Tiger's Cub (1920)
- Experience (1921)
- Love of Women (1924)
- The Police Patrol (1925)
- Running Wild (1927)
