= An Adventure on the Mexican Border =

1913 film

- Directed by: Romaine Fielding
- Written by: Romaine Fielding
- Produced by: Lubin Manufacturing Company; Siegmund Lubin
- Starring: Romaine Fielding; Mary Ryan
- Distributed by: General Film Company
- Release date: March 15, 1913
- Running time: 2 reels
- Country: United States
- Languages: Silent; English intertitles

An Adventure on the Mexican Border is a 1913 American short silent Western film directed and written by and starring Romaine Fielding with co-stars Mary Ryan and Robyn Adair. It was filmed at Nogales, Arizona.

== Plot ==
The film depicts the actions of U.S. troops stationed on the boundary dividing the United States from Mexico "with a view to protecting the International line and the citizens of the United States." On the other side of the border, Mexican soldiers are "camped to do likewise for their country." In this highly charged climate "one of the bright-eyed senoritas from the southern race" has captivated an officer from each side. The Mexican captain, played by Fielding, wins her hand via "quiet love and kindness," while "the irrepressible, impassionate United States trooper tries to take her heart by storm." By bringing the U.S. regiment into conflict with the Mexican troops, the rivalry "nearly causes international complications."

== Cast ==
- Romaine Fielding – The Mexican Captain
- Mary Ryan – The Mexican Senorita
- Robyn Adair – The U.S. Cavalry Lieutenant
- Richard Wangermann – The Senorita's Father
- Eleanor Mason – The Senorita's Friend
- Maurice Cytron – The U.S. Cavalry Private (* Mauritz Cytron)
- Henry Aldrich – The Mexican Lieutenant

== Themes ==
The film is one of several in which Romaine Fielding portrays a Mexican character. In this instance, the protagonists display Mexican men in a positive light, as honest and brave. This stands in contrast to other films in which Fielding portrayed Mexican characters in a negative light (Pedro's Treachery and The Man from the West).

== Critical reception ==
Moving Picture World complimented the film's "convincingly military" atmosphere, which features "a troop, or two of the United States cavalry." The reviewer equally praised Fielding for not making "a gingerbread hero of an American lieutenant and an impossible victim of a Mexican."
