= Hiawanda's Cross =

- Directed by: Romaine Fielding
- Written by: Jeanette Spiess
- Produced by: Lubin Manufacturing Company; Siegmund Lubin
- Starring: Romaine Fielding; Mary Ryan
- Distributed by: General Film Company
- Release date: November 8, 1913
- Running time: 1 reel
- Country: USA
- Language: Silent..English titles

Hiawanda's Cross is a 1913 silent short drama film directed and written by Romaine Fielding with scenario by Jeanette Spiess. Mary Ryan returns as costar. It was produced by the Lubin Manufacturing Company and distributed through the General Film Company.

It was filmed in Las Vegas, New Mexico.

== Cast ==
- Romaine Fielding - The Missionary
- Mary Ryan - Hiawanda
- Jeanette Spiess
- Rose Powers
- Chella Van Petten
- Ethel Danziger
- Carl Ilfeld - Gray Eagle
- Hans Lewis
