= The Accusing Hand =

1913 Western film

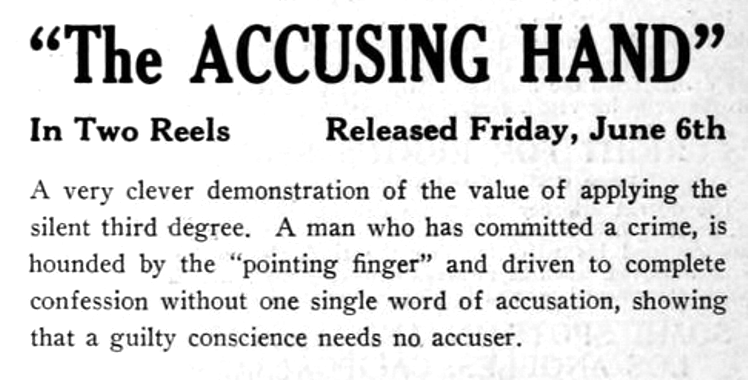
- Directed by: Romaine Fielding
- Produced by: Lubin Manufacturing Company; Siegmund Lubin
- Starring: Romaine Fielding; Mary Ryan; Robyn Adair
- Distributed by: Lubin Manufacturing Company
- Release date: June 6, 1913
- Running time: 2 reels
- Country: United States
- Languages: Silent; English intertitles

The Accusing Hand is a 1913 American short silent Western film directed by Romaine Fielding. It stars Fielding himself with Mary Ryan and Robyn Adair. The film was produced by and distributed by Lubin Manufacturing Company. The Accusing Hand was shot in and around Tucson, Arizona.

== Plot ==
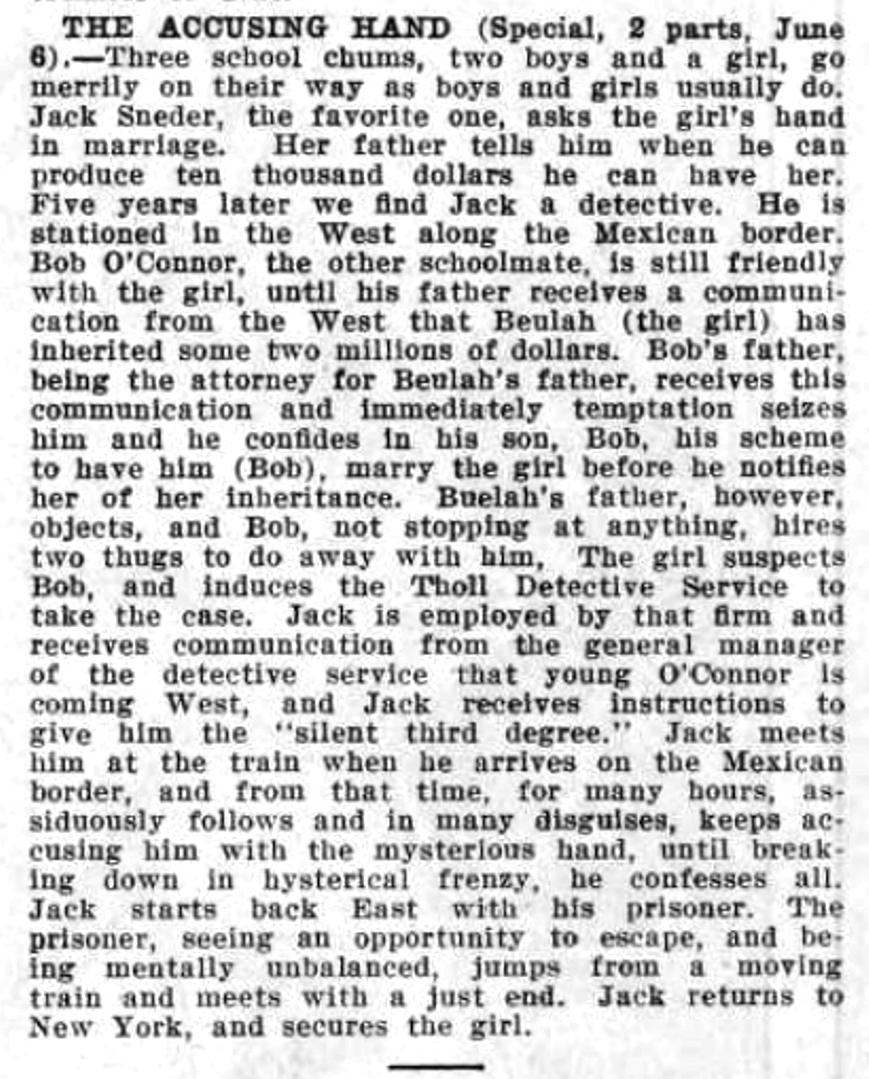

As described in Moving Picture World: three school chums, two boys and a girl, go merrily on their way as boys and girls usually do. Jack Sneder, the favorite one, asks the girl's hand in marriage. Her father tells him when he can produce ten thousand dollars he can have her. Five years later we find Jack a detective. He is stationed in the West along the Mexican border. Bob O'Connor, the other schoolmate, is still friendly with the girl, until his father receives a communication from the West that Beulah (the girl) has inherited some two millions of dollars. Bob's father, being the attorney for Beulah's father, receives this communication and immediately temptation seizes him and he confides in his son his scheme to have him (Bob), marry the girl before he notifies her of her inheritance. Beulah's father, however, objects, and Bob, not stopping at anything, hires two thugs to do away with him. The girl suspects Bob and induces the Tuell Detective Service to take the case. Jack is employed by that firm and receives communication from the general manager of the detective service that young O'Connor is coming West, and Jack receives instructions to give him the "silent third degree." Jack meets him at the train when he arrives on the Mexican border and from that time, tor many hours, assiduously follows and in many disguises, keeps accusing him with the mysterious hand, until breaking down in hysterical frenzy, he confesses all. Jack starts back East with his prisoner. The prisoner, seeing an opportunity to escape, and being mentally unbalanced, jumps from a moving train and meets with a just end. Jack returns to New York, and secures the girl.

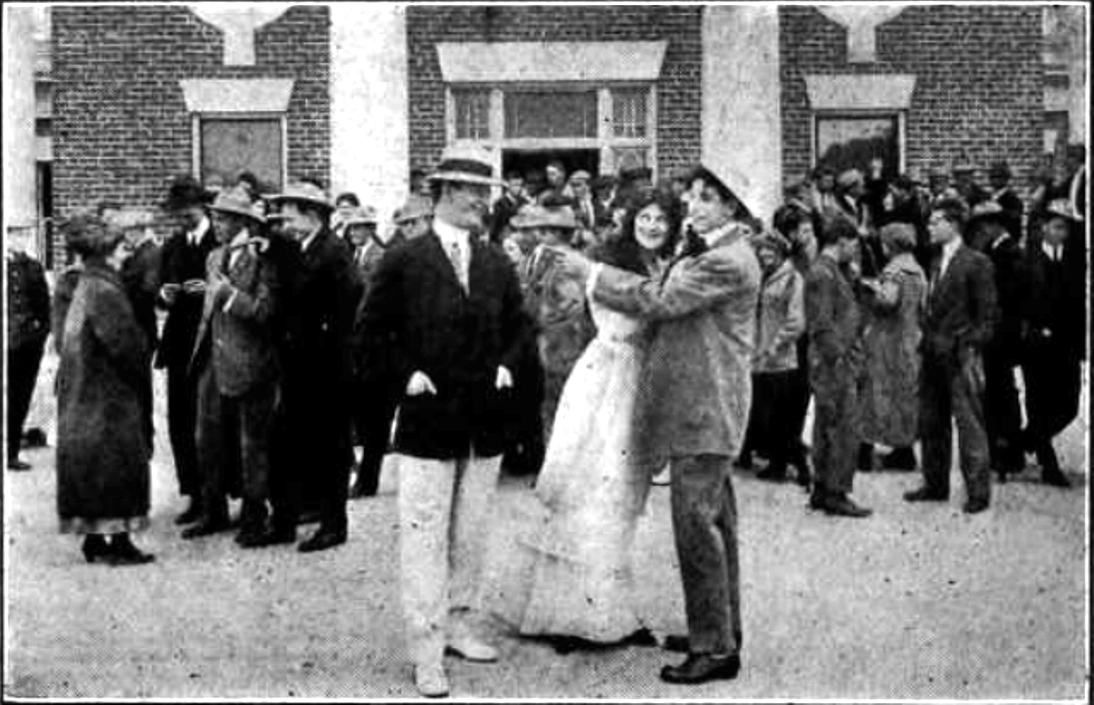
Scene from the film

== Cast ==
- Romaine Fielding as Jack Sueder
- Mary Ryan as Beulah
- Robyn Adair as Bob O'Connor

== Production ==
The full filming took place at Tucson, Arizona.
