= The Unknown (1913 film) =

- Directed by: Romaine Fielding
- Written by: Romaine Fielding
- Produced by: Lubin Manufacturing Company; Siegmund Lubin
- Starring: Romaine Fielding; Mary Ryan
- Distributed by: General Film Company
- Release date: February 22, 1913
- Running time: 1 reel
- Country: USA
- Language: Silent..English titles

The Unknown is a 1913 silent film drama short directed, written by and starring Romaine Fielding with costars Mary Ryan and Robyn Adair. It was produced by the Lubin Manufacturing Company and released by General Film Company.

== Cast ==
- Romaine Fielding - Julio
- Mary Ryan - Juanita
- Robyn Adair - Robert Tyler
- Richard Wangermann - Juanita's Father
