= The Way of the Mountains =

- Directed by: Romaine Fielding
- Produced by: Siegmund Lubin
- Starring: Robyn Adair; Mary Ryan
- Distributed by: General Film Company
- Release date: November 11, 1912
- Running time: 1 reel
- Country: USA
- Language: Silent..English titles

The Way of the Mountains is a 1912 silent short film directed by Romaine Fielding and starring Mary Ryan. It was produced by the Lubin Manufacturing Company and distributed by the General Film Company.

== Cast ==
- Robyn Adair - Bob Taylor
- Mary Ryan - Mary Beall
