= Chief White Eagle (film) =

1912 film

- Directed by: Romaine Fielding
- Produced by: Siegmund Lubin
- Starring: Romaine Fielding; Mary Ryan
- Distributed by: General Film Company
- Release date: November 16, 1912
- Running time: 1 reel
- Country: United States
- Languages: Silent; English intertitles

Chief White Eagle is a 1912 American short silent Western film directed by and starring Romaine Fielding with Mary Ryan. It was produced by the Lubin Manufacturing Company and distributed by the General Film Company.

== Cast ==
- Romaine Fielding as Chief White Eagle
- Mary Ryan as Estrella
- Robyn Adair as Lt Adair
- Richard Wangermann asa The Major
- Nellie Cytron as Estrella's Mother
- George Clancey as The Ranchman
