= Who Is the Savage? =

- Directed by: Romaine Fielding
- Written by: Romaine Fielding
- Produced by: Lubin Manufacturing Company; Siegmund Lubin
- Starring: Romaine Fielding; Mary Ryan
- Distributed by: General Film Company
- Release date: January 21, 1913
- Running time: 1 reel
- Country: USA
- Language: Silent..English titles

Who Is the Savage? is a lost 1913 silent dramatic short directed, written by, and starring Romaine Fielding with Mary Ryan. Moving Picture World gave it a favorable writeup, calling it a comedic farce. The plot featured a white woman stealing the child of an "Indian" woman. This storyline caused some controversy with some critics. It was a Lubin film.

Moving Picture World gave it a favorable write up, calling it a comedic farce.

== Cast ==
- Romaine Fielding - Mr. Van Vechten
- Mary Ryan - Mrs. Van Vechten
- Belle Bennett - Mrs. Norris
