= The Sheriff's Prisoner =

1912 film

- Produced by: Siegmund Lubin
- Starring: Robyn Adair; Mary Ryan
- Distributed by: General Film Company
- Release date: August 31, 1912
- Running time: 1 reel
- Country: United States
- Languages: Silent; English intertitles

The Sheriff's Prisoner is a 1912 American short silent Western film starring Robyn Adair and Mary Ryan, a popular stage actress making her motion picture debut. The Lubin Manufacturing Company produced with release by the General Film Company.

== Cast ==
- Robyn Adair as Bob Stern, the Prospector
- Mary Ryan
- George Clancey as Sheriff Clancey
