= The Circle's End =

1914 film

- Directed by: Romaine Fielding
- Produced by: Lubin Manufacturing Company; Siegmund Lubin
- Starring: Romaine Fielding; Mary Ryan
- Distributed by: General Film Company
- Release date: January 3, 1914
- Running time: 1 reel
- Country: USA
- Language: Silent..English titles

The Circle's End [aka The Higher Law] is a 1914 silent film drama short directed by and starring Romaine Fielding. His costar was actress Mary Ryan from Broadway. It was produced by the Lubin Manufacturing Company and distributed by the General Film Company.

== Cast ==
- Romaine Fielding - Tom Gaynor
- Mary Ryan - Mary Butts, The Sheriff's Daughter
- Edmund Cobb - The Bandit
- Al Jacoby - Sheriff Butts
- Jesse Robinson -
