= Courageous Blood =

- Directed by: Romaine Fielding
- Produced by: Lubin Manufacturing Company; Siegmund Lubin
- Starring: Romaine Fielding; Mary Ryan
- Distributed by: General Film Company
- Release date: January 6, 1913
- Running time: 1 reel
- Country: USA
- Language: Silent..English

Courageous Blood is a 1913 silent film drama short directed by and starring Romaine Fielding. His costars were Mary Ryan and Robyn Adair. It was produced by the Lubin Manufacturing Company.

== Cast ==
- Romaine Fielding – Romanzo Fernandez
- Mary Ryan – Mary Burke
- Robyn Adair – Rock, a Rustler
- Richard Wangermann – Colonel Gordon
- Eleanor Mason – Colonel Gordon's Daughter
- George Miller – The Deserter
