= The Rattlesnake (film) =

1913 film by Romaine Fielding

- Directed by: Romaine Fielding
- Written by: Romaine Fielding; Emmett C. Hall
- Produced by: Lubin Manufacturing Company; Siegmund Lubin
- Starring: Romaine Fielding; Mary Ryan
- Distributed by: General Film Company
- Release date: October 30, 1913
- Running time: 2 reels
- Country: USA
- Language: Silent..English titles

The Rattlesnake is a 1913 silent film short produced by the Lubin Manufacturing Company and distributed by the General Film Company. It was directed by and starred Romaine Fielding with stage star Mary Ryan. This film exists incomplete in the Library of Congress collection. It was filmed in Las Vegas, New Mexico.

== Cast ==
- Romaine Fielding as Tony
- Mary Ryan as Inez
- Maurice Cytron as Jones (*as Mortiz Cytron)
- Jesse Robinson as John Gordon (*as Jess Robinson)
- Alice Danzinger as The Child
- Billie Brockwell as Tony's Mother
- Gladys Brockwell as Tony's Sister
- Al Jacoby as Inez's Father
- Eleanor Mason as Inez's Mother
- Ludwig Ilfield as The Surveyor
