= The Uprising (1912 film) =

- Directed by: Romaine Fielding
- Produced by: Siegmund Lubin
- Starring: Romaine Fielding; Mary Ryan
- Distributed by: General Film Company (US); Motion Picture Sales Agency (UK)
- Release date: October 14, 1912
- Running time: 1 reel

The Uprising is a 1912 silent short film drama directed by Romaine Fielding for the Lubin Manufacturing Company.

== Cast ==
- Romaine Fielding - The Father
- Mary Ryan - Mary (*as Mary E. Ryan)
- Robyn Adair - Bob, Mary's Sweetheart
