= His Western Way =

1912 film

- Directed by: Romaine Fielding
- Produced by: Lubin Manufacturing Company; Siegmund Lubin
- Starring: Romaine Fielding; Mary Ryan
- Distributed by: General Film Company
- Release date: December 19, 1912
- Running time: 1 reel
- Country: United States
- Languages: Silent; English intertitles

His Western Way is a 1912 American short silent Western film directed by Romaine Fielding. It stars Fielding himself and Mary Ryan. The film was produced by the Lubin Manufacturing Company and distributed by General Film Company.

== Cast ==
- Romaine Fielding – The Cowboy
- Mary Ryan
- Robyn Adair – Percy, the Man About Town
