= The Reformed Outlaw =

1913 film

- Directed by: Romaine Fielding
- Produced by: Lubin Manufacturing Company; Siegmund Lubin
- Starring: Mary Ryan; Jesse Robinson
- Distributed by: General Film Company
- Release date: August 26, 1913
- Running time: 1 reel
- Country: United States
- Languages: Silent; English intertitles

The Reformed Outlaw is a 1913 American short silent Western film directed by Romaine Fielding and starring Mary Ryan, Robyn Adair and Jesse Robinson. The Lubin Manufacturing Company produced the film and General Film Company distributed. The film is not to be confused with the 1912 film of the same name produced by Thomas Ince.

== Cast ==
- Mary Ryan
- Robyn Adair
- Jesse Robinson
- Maurice Cytron
- Minnie Frayne
- Paul Keele
- Buck Buckner
- Henry Aldrich
