= His Blind Power =

- Directed by: Romaine Fielding
- Produced by: Lubin Manufacturing Company; Siegmund Lubin
- Distributed by: General Film Company
- Release date: December 20, 1913
- Running time: 3 reels
- Country: USA
- Language: Silent..English titles

His Blind Power is a 1913 silent film drama short directed by Romaine Fielding. It starred Fielding and Mary Ryan and was produced by the Lubin Manufacturing Company.

== Cast ==
- Romaine Fielding
- Mary Ryan
- Billie Brockwell - (*billed as Lillian Brockwell)
- Gladys Brockwell
- Edmund Cobb
- Maurice Cytron
- Jack Ellis
- Eleanor Mason
- Jesse Robinson
