= The Power of Silence (1912 film) =

- Directed by: Romaine Fielding
- Produced by: Lubin Manufacturing Company; Siegmund Lubin
- Starring: Romaine Fielding; Mary Ryan
- Distributed by: General Film Company
- Release date: December 30, 1912
- Running time: 2 reels
- Country: United States
- Language: Silent..English titles

The Power of Silence is a 1912 silent film drama short directed by and starring Romaine Fielding, with Mary Ryan and Robyn Adair. It was produced by the Lubin Manufacturing Company.

== Cast ==
- Romaine Fielding - Thomas Lowry, a Ranch owner or The Silent One
- Mary Ryan - Jane, Lowry's Daughter
- Robyn Adair - Robert Sinclair, Lowry's Nephew
- Richard Wangermann - (*billed Richard Wangemann)
- Henry Aldrich - (*billed Henry Alrich)
- George Clancey - (*billed George Clancy)
- Edgar Jones - unknown role
- Clara Williams - unknown role
