= In the Land of the Cactus =

- Directed by: Romaine Fielding
- Written by: Romaine Fielding
- Produced by: Lubin Manufacturing Company
- Starring: Romaine Fielding; Mary Ryan
- Distributed by: General Film Company
- Release date: March 29, 1913
- Running time: 1 reel
- Country: USA
- Language: Silent..English titles

In the Land of the Cactus is a 1913 silent film short produced by the Lubin Manufacturing Company of Philadelphia. It was directed, written by and starring Romaine Fielding. Mary Ryan also costars. It is not to be confused with a 1911 American Film Company film of the same name.

== Cast ==
- Romaine Fielding - Ramon
- Mary Ryan - Estelle Royster
- Robyn Adair - Bob Armabile
- Richard Wangermann -
