= The Man from the West (1914 film) =

1914 film

- Directed by: Romaine Fielding
- Produced by: Lubin Manufacturing Company; Siegmund Lubin
- Starring: Romaine Fielding; Mary Ryan; Robyn Adair
- Distributed by: General Film Company
- Release date: January 22, 1914
- Running time: 2 reels
- Country: United States
- Languages: Silent; English intertitles

The Man from the West is a 1914 American short silent Western film directed by Romaine Fielding. It also starred Mary Ryan and Robyn Adair. It was filmed in Silver City, New Mexico, produced by the Lubin Manufacturing Company and distributed by the General Film Company.

== Cast ==
- Romaine Fielding – The Man from the West
- Mary Ryan – Rose Stillwell
- Robyn Adair – Percy, Rose's Fiancé
- Richard Wangermann – Mr. Stillwell (as Richard Wangmann)
- Jesse Robinson – Joe, The Renegade
- Henry Aldrich
- Maurice Cytron
