= Hemlock Hoax, the Detective =

1910 silent short film

- Production company: Lubin Manufacturing Company
- Distributed by: Lubin Manufacturing Company
- Release date: April 11, 1910 (United States)
- Country: United States
- Language: Silent

Hemlock Hoax, the Detective is an American short comedy film produced and distributed in 1910 by the Lubin Manufacturing Company. The silent film features a detective named Hemlock Hoax who tries to solve a murder, which unbeknownst to him is a practical joke being played on him by two young boys. It was one of many shorts designed to derive its humor from a sleuth whose name was similar to Sherlock Holmes.

The character of Hemlock Hoax was based on a minor character from a film story that had been rejected. The finished film was released in April as a split reel, being presented with two other Lubin comedies. The black-and-white short received positive reviews with several journalists praising the film's humor. It is unclear whether there is a surviving print of the film, and the identities of the film's cast and crew are not recorded.

== Plot ==
Hemlock Hoax is a detective who has little respect in the small tropical town where he lives, despite the fact that he thinks he is a better sleuth than Sherlock Holmes. A pair of boys decide to play a trick on Hoax and tell him about a murder. Hoax rushes to scene of the crime where he discovers a shred of cloth, later finding that a tramp is wearing the same type of clothes that he found. The tramp runs away and Hoax gives chase, with other people helping the pursuit. Eventually, Hoax captures the tramp with the aid of a police officer, and returns to the victim's body with the man. Hoax then comes to a realization that the body was just a dummy that had been stuffed with the leaves. The crowd has a laugh at Hoax's expense while the two boys are punished.

== Production ==
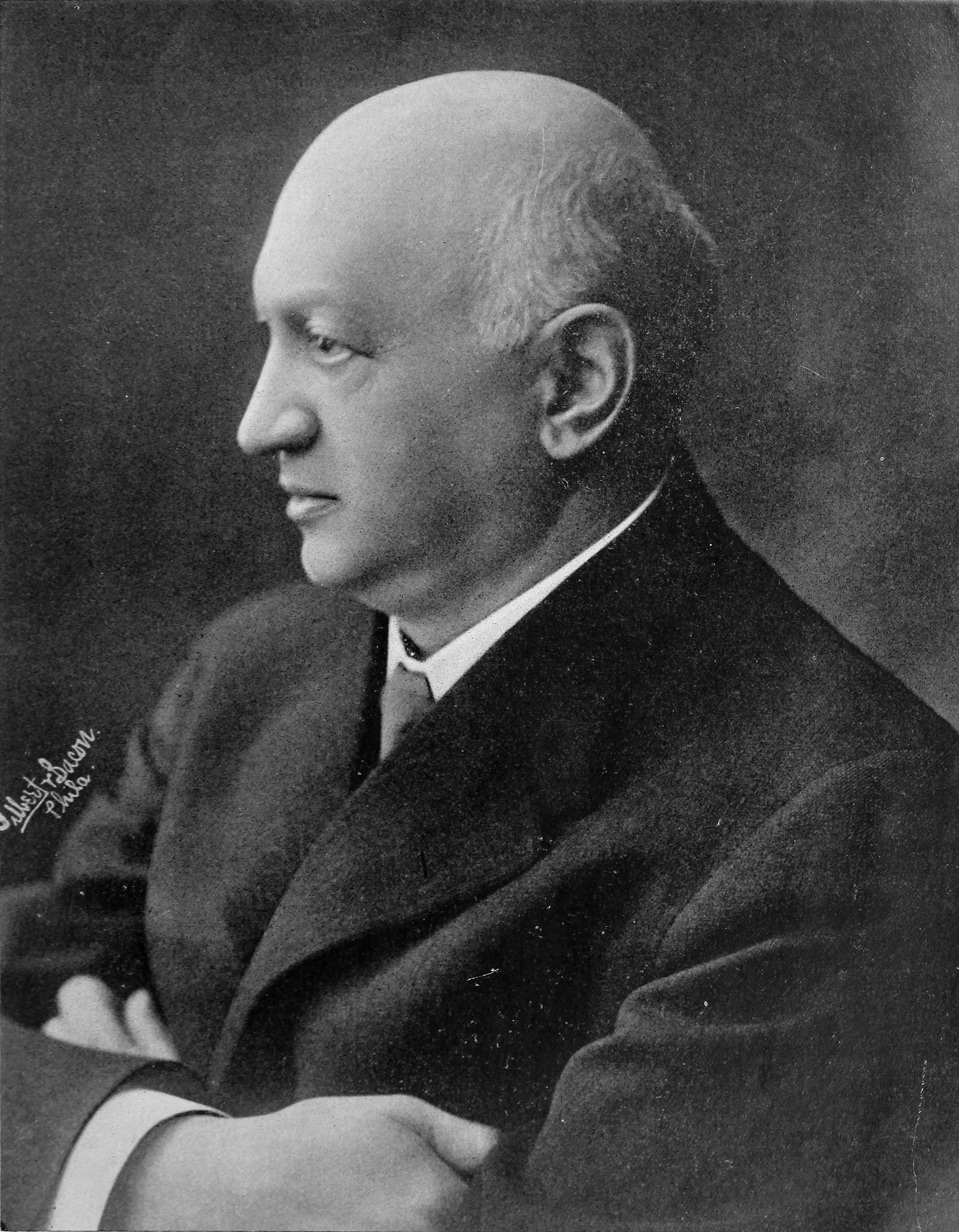
Siegmund Lubin in 1913. His company produced and distributed Hemlock Hoax, the Detective.

Hemlock Hoax, the Detective was produced by the Lubin Manufacturing Company, a company founded by German-American film pioneer Siegmund Lubin. It was known for producing films that were similar to others successful at the time. Author Ron Haydock wrote in his book Holmes and Watson On Screen that Hemlock Hoax "was another in the long and ever-growing line of comedies that were having fun with sleuths whose names were similar to [Sherlock] Holmes".

The featured character of Hemlock Hoax had originally been a minor character in a film story that had been rejected before he appeared in Hemlock Hoax, the Detective. It is a silent film and was filmed in black-and-white, and the finished product comprised 232 feet (71 m) of film. The identities of the cast and crew are not recorded.

== Release and reception ==
Hemlock Hoax, the Detective was released on April 11, 1910, being distributed by the Lubin Manufacturing Company. Advertising touted the film as "a roaring comedy that cannot but be funny." The film was a split-reeler, and was presented alongside the Lubin comedies Jones' Watch, about a man who believes his watch has been robbed, and The Fisherman's Luck, centering on a fisherman who causes mischief while at the lake one day.

Hemlock Hoax, the Detective received positive reviews upon release. An article in film journal The Moving Picture World written by an unnamed journalist opined that the fact that the films only totaled up to 990 feet (300 m) and yet had "three strong comedy subjects on the same reel" was notable. The reviewer wrote that "the three topics are so entirely different that there is no confliction and the reel is one of the best comedy offerings in a long time."

Another Moving Picture World reviewer wrote positively of the film, opining "the acting is clever, developing many amusing features as it proceeds. To see a detective hunting clews with a magnifying glass is funny indeed." A May review in Indiana newspaper The Huntington Herald described the film positively as "a comical detective picture full of exciting situations".

A review in Connecticut newspaper The New London Day lauded the three films, writing that the pictures were "a trio of laugh provokers." Hemlock Hoax, the Detective was still being screened as late as October 1911. As of October 2009, it is unclear whether there is a surviving print of Hemlock Hoax, the Detective; it has likely become a lost film. If rediscovered, the film would be in the public domain.

== See also ==
- List of American films of 1910

== Bibliography ==
- Haydock, Ron (1978). Deerstalker!: Holmes and Watson on screen. Scarecrow Press. ISBN 978-0-8108-1061-7.
- Niver, Kemp R. (1968). The First Twenty Years: A Segment of Film History. Locare Research Group. ISBN 9780913986011.
- Seiler, Robert Morris; Seiler, Tamara Palmer (2013). Reel Time: Movie Exhibitors and Movie Audiences in Prairie Canada, 1896 to 1986. Athabasca University Press. ISBN 978-1-926836-99-7.
- The Editor: The Journal of Information for Literary Workers. 1911.
