= The Power of Silence =

The Power of Silence may refer to:

- The Power of Silence (1912 film), a silent film drama short
- The Power of Silence (1928 film), an American silent film
- Silence (2013 film), also known as The Power of Silence, a Malayalam thriller film
