= A Girl Spy in Mexico =

- Directed by: Romaine Fielding
- Produced by: Lubin Manufacturing Company
- Starring: Romaine Fielding; Mary Ryan
- Distributed by: General Film Company
- Release date: May 10, 1913
- Running time: 1 reel
- Country: USA
- Language: Silent..English titles

A Girl Spy in Mexico is a 1913 silent film short directed by and starring Romaine Fielding and costarring Mary Ryan. It was produced by the Lubin Manufacturing Company, Philadelphia, and distributed by the General Film Company.

== Cast ==
- Romaine Fielding - Colonel Ferro
- Mary Ryan - Senorita Armaje- the Girl Spy
- Robyn Adair - Lt. Blanco
