= The Family Next Door (1912 film) =

- Directed by: Romaine Fielding
- Produced by: Siegmund Lubin
- Starring: Romaine Fielding; Mary Ryan
- Distributed by: General Film Company
- Release date: November 2, 1912
- Running time: short;1 reel
- Country: USA
- Language: Silent..English

The Family Next Door is a 1912 silent short film directed by and starring Romaine Fielding and with Mary Ryan.

== Cast ==
- Romaine Fielding - Bob Ford
- Mary Ryan - Mary Heap
- Robyn Adair - Roy Ford
