= Rastus Among the Zulus =

Short comedy film

Rastus Among the Zulus is an extant short comedy film produced by the Lubin Manufacturing Company. It depicts an African American falling asleep and being "shanghaied" before being shipwrecked and captured by Zulus.

As he is prepared to be cooked in a pot, he is asked if he will choose to marry the chief's daughter in order to save his life. He chooses the pot, then wakes up back on the wharf to find himself being clubbed by a policeman.

An advertisement for a split reel of Sigmund Lubin's A Widow's Wiles and this film survives. In 2009 the film was released with three other early American short films on a DVD titled Visions of Africa. The film was one of several film, vaudeville, and circus acts that depicted Zulus to the American public. Lubin also made the 1914 film Rastus Knew it Wasn't.

As a comedy, it was a parody of D. W. Griffith's A Zulu's Heart and other contemporary films that depicted Zulus in adventure settings where the white man usually came out on top, and was likewise intended to emphasize the superiority of Western European culture.
