= Mary Ryan (actress) =

American actress

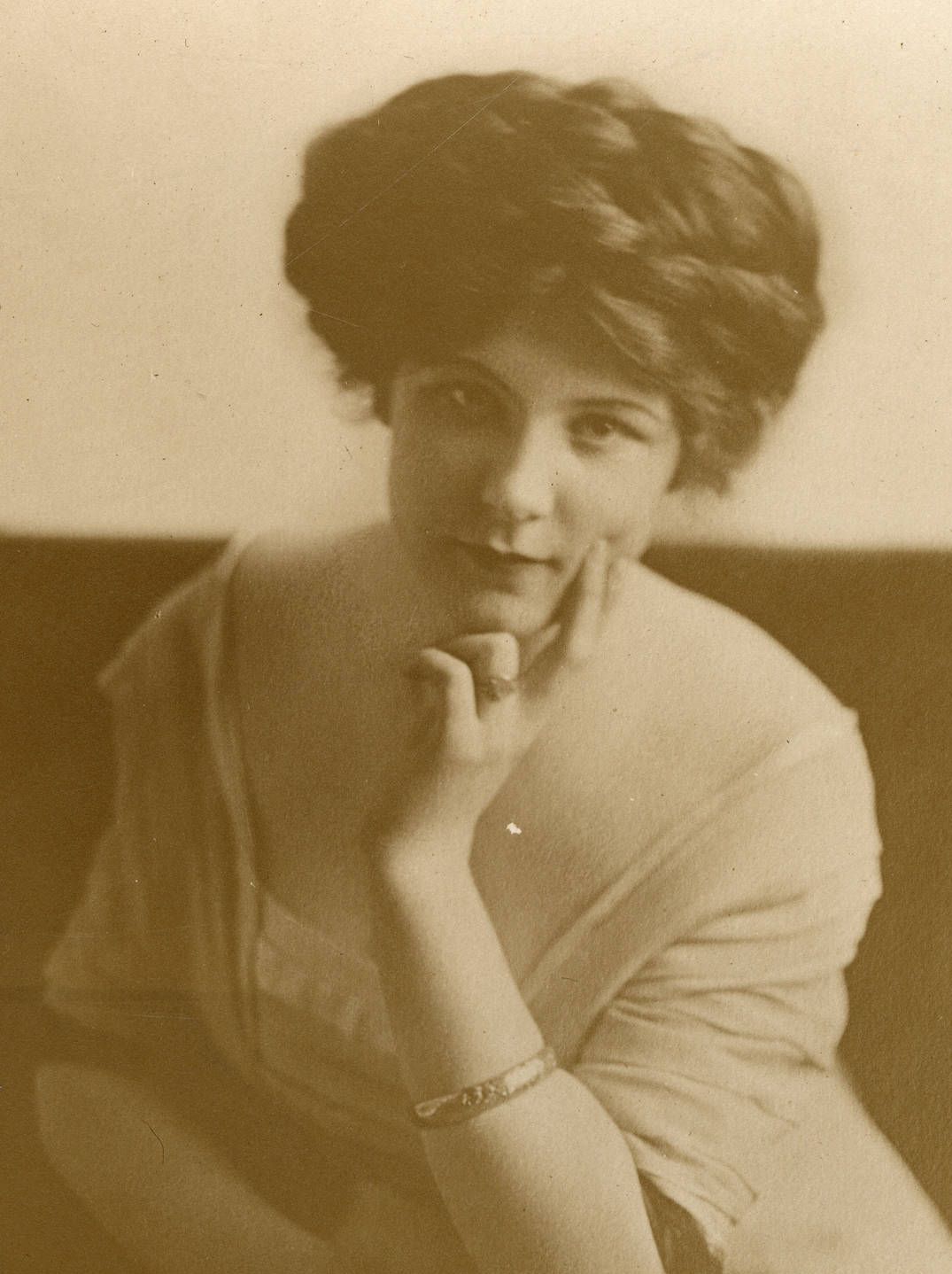
- Ryan in 1913
- Born: November 11, 1885; Brooklyn, New York, U.S.
- Died: October 2, 1948 (aged 62); Cranford, New Jersey, U.S.
- Occupation: Actress
- Years active: 1890s–1936
- Spouse: Samuel Forrest

Mary E. Ryan (November 11, 1885 – October 2, 1948) was an American stage and screen actress. She began acting as a child and was a popular young ingenue in the first decade of the twentieth century. She later made over 30 silent film shorts. She appeared in the 1906 hit play Brewster's Millions starring Edward Abeles. She was the leading lady to John Barrymore in his first breakout Broadway success, The Fortune Hunter (1909). In 1912 she signed with the Philadelphia-based Lubin Manufacturing Company to appear in their short films.

Ryan was married to stage director Sam Forrest from 1908 until his death in 1944. She died October 2, 1948, from undisclosed causes, at age 62.

== Filmography ==
- The Sheriff's Prisoner (1912) (short)
- The Uprising (1912) (short)
- The Family Next Door (1912) (short)
- The Way of the Mountains (1912) (short)
- Chief White Eagle (1912) (short)
- His Western Way (1912) (short)
- The Blind Cattle King (1912) (short)
- The Power of Silence (1912) (short)
- His Blind Power (1913)
- Courageous Blood (1913) (short)
- Who is the Savage? (1913) (short)
- The Unknown (1913) (short)
- An Adventure on the Mexican Border (1913) (short)
- In the Land of the Cactus (1913) (short)
- Pedro's Treachery (1913) (short)
- A Girl Spy in Mexico (1913) (short)
- The Penalty of Jealousy (1913) (short)
- The Accusing Hand (1913) (short)
- The Weaker Mind (1913) (short)
- A Dash For Liberty (1913) (short)
- The Fatal Scar (1913) (short)
- The Reformed Outlaw (1913) (short)
- The Clod (1913) (short)
- The Higher Law (1913) (short)
- The Evil Eye (1913) (short)
- The Rattlesnake (1913) (short)
- Hiawanda's Cross (1913) (short)
- The Circle's End (1914) (short)
- The Man from the West (1914) (short)
- Stop Thief! (1915)
- Home-Keeping Hearts (1921)
