= The Clod =

1913 film

- Directed by: Romaine Fielding
- Written by: George Terwilliger
- Starring: Romaine Fielding; Mary Ryan; Minnie Frayne
- Production company: Lubin Manufacturing Company
- Distributed by: General Film Company
- Release date: September 13, 1913
- Running time: 2 reels
- Country: United States
- Languages: Silent; English intertitles

The Clod is a 1913 American short silent Western film about the Mexican Revolution directed by and starring Romaine Fielding with co-stars Mary Ryan and Minnie Frayne. It was produced by Siegmund Lubin and distributed by the General Film Company.

== Cast ==
- Romaine Fielding – Pedro Mendez, the Clod
- Mary Ryan – Pedro's Wife
- Minnie Frayne – Pedro's Mother
