= The Blind Cattle King =

- Directed by: Romaine Fielding
- Produced by: Lubin Manufacturing Company; Siegmund Lubin
- Starring: Romaine Fielding; Mary Ryan
- Distributed by: General Film Company
- Release date: December 28, 1912
- Country: USA
- Language: Silent..English titles

The Blind Cattle King is a 1912 silent film drama short directed by Romaine Fielding and produced by the Lubin Manufacturing Company at their studio in Prescott, Arizona. It starred Fielding and stage actress Mary Ryan, now performing in films.

== Cast ==
- Romaine Fielding - Don Romero
- Mary Ryan - Maud Barnes
