= How Brown Saw the Baseball Game =

1907 silent short film

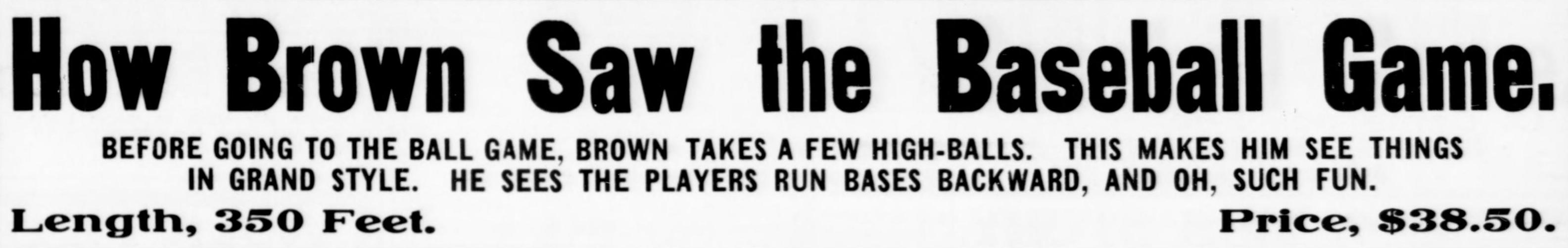
- Advertisement in Billboard magazine in 1907
- Production company: Lubin Manufacturing Company
- Distributed by: Lubin Manufacturing Company
- Release date: November 16, 1907 (United States)
- Country: United States
- Language: Silent

How Brown Saw the Baseball Game is an American short silent comedy film produced in 1907 and distributed by the Lubin Manufacturing Company. The film follows a baseball fan named Mr. Brown who overdrinks before a game and becomes so intoxicated that the game appears to him in reverse motion. During production, trick photography was used to achieve this effect. The film was released in November 1907. It received a positive review in a 1908 issue of The Courier-Journal that reported the film was successful and "truly funny". As of 2021, it is unclear whether a print of the film has survived. The identities of the film's cast and production crew are unknown. Film historians have noted similarities between the plot of How Brown Saw the Baseball Game and How the Office Boy Saw the Ball Game, a comedy film directed by Edwin S. Porter that was released a year earlier.

== Plot ==
Before heading out to watch a baseball game at a nearby ballpark, sports fan Mr. Brown drinks several highball cocktails. He arrives at the ballpark to watch the game, but has become so inebriated that the game appears to him in reverse, with the players running the bases backwards and the baseball flying back into the pitcher's hand. After the game is over, Mr. Brown is escorted home by one of his friends. When they arrive at Brown's house, they encounter his wife, who becomes furious with the friend and proceeds to physically assault him, believing he is responsible for her husband's severe intoxication.

== Production ==
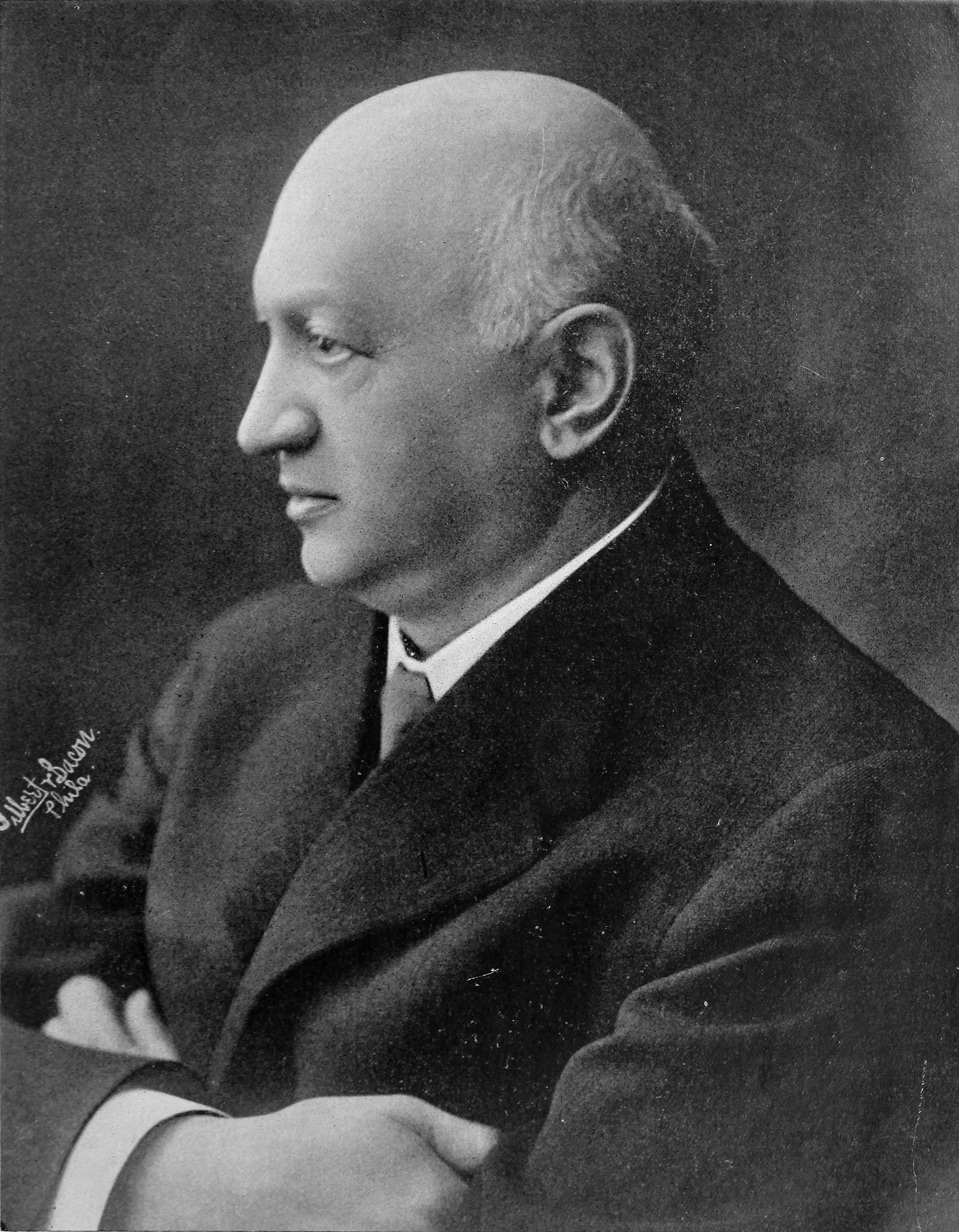
Siegmund Lubin in 1913. His company produced and distributed How Brown Saw the Baseball Game.

How Brown Saw the Baseball Game was produced by the Lubin Manufacturing Company, a company founded by German-American film pioneer Siegmund Lubin. At the time How Brown Saw the Baseball Game was made, the company was creating and distributing up to three films a week. The identities of How Brown Saw the Baseball Game's director and cast are not known.

It is a silent film shot in black and white, and the finished product comprised 350 feet (110 m) of film. For the scenes which took place at the ballpark, the filmmakers used a form of trick photography to show the baseball players running backwards. Siegmund Lubin filed a copyright for the film on October 26, 1907, under the title How Jones Saw the Baseball Game.

== Release and reception ==
How Brown Saw the Baseball Game was released to theaters by Lubin Manufacturing Company on November 16, 1907, and was still being shown as late as January 1910. During this time, the film was sometimes presented on the same bill with the 1907 film Neighbors Who Borrow, a short comedy film about a man who lends nearly everything he owns to his neighbors until his wife returns home and berates him for doing so.

Advertisements for the film touted it as "such fun", and Lubin himself promoted the film as a "screamingly funny farce". It received a positive review in a June 1908 issue of The Courier-Journal which described the film as "truly funny" and that it proved to be "a veritable hit".

Modern writings have often suggested that How Brown Saw the Baseball Game was produced as Lubin Manufacturing Company's alternative to the Edwin S. Porter-directed comedy How the Office Boy Saw the Ball Game, a film released by Edison Studios in 1906 about an office employee sneaking out of his workplace to watch a baseball game only to discover his employer in a nearby seat. Lubin Manufacturing Company was known for creating films similar to competing motion pictures made by other studios. Lubin had previously created films resembling Edison Studios' releases Uncle Tom's Cabin and The Great Train Robbery. Author Jack Spears wrote in his book Hollywood: The Golden Era that How Brown Saw the Baseball Game and How the Office Boy Saw the Ball Game "used practically the same plot"; Rob Edelman's article "The Baseball Film: to 1920" in the journal Base Ball likewise notes the similarities of their plotlines.

As of February 2021, it is unclear whether there is a surviving print of How Brown Saw the Baseball Game; it has likely become a lost film. If a print is rediscovered, the film would be in the public domain.

== Bibliography ==
- Erickson, Hal (August 1, 1992). Baseball in the movies: a comprehensive reference, 1915–1991. McFarland & Company. ISBN 978-0-89950-657-9. Archived from the original on April 27, 2016.
- Erickson, Hal (2016). The Baseball Filmography, 1915 Through 2001 (2nd ed.). McFarland & Company. ISBN 978-1-4766-0785-6.
- Seiler, Robert Morris; Seiler, Tamara Palmer (2013). Reel Time: Movie Exhibitors and Movie Audiences in Prairie Canada, 1896 to 1986. Athabasca University Press. ISBN 978-1-926836-99-7. Archived from the original on June 17, 2016.
- Spears, Jack (1971). Hollywood: the Golden Era. A. S. Barnes. ISBN 978-0-498-07552-0. Archived from the original on June 29, 2016.
- Wood, Stephen C.; Pincus, J. David (January 1, 2003). Reel Baseball: Essays and Interviews on the National Pastime, Hollywood, and American Culture. McFarland & Company. ISBN 978-0-7864-1389-8.
