= The Man from the West =

Man from the West may refer to:

- The Man from the West (1912 film)
- The Man from the West (1914 film)
- The Man from the West (1926 film)
