= Pedro's Treachery =

- Directed by: Romaine Fielding
- Produced by: Lubin Manufacturing Company; Siegmund Lubin
- Starring: Romaine Fielding
- Distributed by: General Film Company
- Release date: May 5, 1913
- Running time: 1 reel
- Country: USA
- Language: Silent..English titles

Pedro's Treachery is a 1913 silent film drama short directed by and starring Romaine Fielding and produced by the Lubin Manufacturing Company.

== Cast ==
- Romaine Fielding - Ned Fields
- Mary Ryan - Helen Andrew
- Robyn Adair - Bob Murray
- Reina Salder - Juanita
- Henry Aldrich - Pedro

== Plot Summary ==
Ned Fields and Helen Andrews are a couple working on a ranch until Bob Murray arrives as the new foreman.Helen quickly becomes infatuated with Bob and begins to distance herself from Ned, who is left humiliated.A Mexican ranch hand witnesses the exchange and mocks Ned; Ned strikes him, and the worker, Pedro,vows revenge. Helen eventually marries Bob.

Pedro later sees a chance to settle his grudge.He steals Ned’s chaps from the bunkhouse,disguises himself with a handkerchief and Ned’s hat,sneaks into the Andrews home,and steals the money Bob had collected to pay the ranch hands. Old Mr. Andrews catches him in the act; during the struggle that follows,Andrews is mortally wounded.When Ned returns from searching for another suspect, he arrives at the house just in time to hear Helen tell Bob and the doctor that she saw him disappear through the doorway as she entered. Believing the cowhands will show him no mercy, Ned decides to flee across the border until he can clear his name.

In Mexico, Ned meets a young woman, Juanita, and the two fall in love.Meanwhile, another ranch worker, Chapo,is fired from the Andrews ranch after being caught mistreating an animal.Chapo also goes to Mexico,where Juanita hires him; he eventually crosses paths with Ned and tries to blackmail him using a newspaper clipping from back home.When that fails, Chapo shows the clipping to Juanita.Ned visits Juanita that evening, learns what has happened, and resolves to confront Pedro.Their fight escalates, a gun is discharged, and Pedro is seriously wounded. The sheriff,who has obtained evidence of Pedro’s guilt from his wife’s confession,arrives in time to arrest Pedro and clear Ned’s name, allowing Ned and Helen to reunite.
