= New Pillow Fight =

1897 short, silent, comedy film

- Directed by: Siegmund Lubin
- Starring: Emily Lubin, Marguerite Sessler
- Release date: 1897
- Country: United States
- Languages: Silent film English intertitles

New Pillow Fight, also titled Daughters' Pillow Fight, is a 1897 American silent short comedy film. It was the first of a mini-genre of pillow fight movies by filmmakers such as Edison, Edwin S. Porter in The Night Before Christmas (1905), and others.

This was Siegmund Lubin's third film, and it was so successful that his sometime employer Thomas Edison, whose own pillow fight film that year may have preceded Lubin's, began sending hired thugs to disrupt Lubin sets. Some theaters experimented with running it backward a second time, as the phenomenon of watching feathers go back into the pillows was new for audiences, "When run backwards this film creates no end of amusement"

== Plot ==
This plot summary was published in The Biograph for 1902:

Code word, Pillow

A new picture of an old subject. Four children are seen sleeping peacefully in two beds. When through the door is seen coming’ on tip-toe a filth one. Seeing that they are sleeping [the child] slyly creeps to the foot of the bed and with a straw tickles the feet of the children who awake and imagine it is one of the children in the other bed, but seeing they are sleeping turn Over and ¢o to sleep again. The little mischief maker slyly creeps to the other bed and. tickles the feet of the other children, they awake, pick up their pillows, cross over to the other bed and pound them with their pillows. ‘These in turn return the fight. and such fun and feathers has never been seen. I inally they see the cause of all their trouble laughing under the bed, they drag him out and once more the feathers fly, but this time upon the mischiel maker. Suddenly the mother appears to learn the cause of all the trouble, an explanation. follows with the result that mamma. takes the mischief maker by the ear and leads him from the room.

75 ft. $9.00}}

== Inspiration on Emily Lubin ==
Lubin was in the process of learning to make films, and this was his third, this time featuring his own daughter Emily, and the daughters of a Philadelphia rare book dealer friend, Charles Sessler. In an interview decades later, Marguerite Sessler Goldsmith recalled what an influence this had on both of them when they were received a private screening.

Having filmed his horse and a passing train, Lubin made his third film in his own house, most likely utilizing the large room at the rear of the second floor where huge bay windows facing west and south provided enough light for filming. Inviting the wife of his friend, rare books dealer Charles Sessler, to bring their young daughters to participate, Lubin staged a pillow fight between his daughters and the Sessler girls. Perhaps inspired by a similar film Edison recently made, Lubin slit the pillows for maximum effect and the action soon disappeared in a cloud of feathers.

Although Marguerite Sessler Goldsmith noted that most of the girls enjoyed the candy he gave them more than the film itself, she remembered Emily Lubin as being far more interested. She became completely engrossed with her father's filmmaking and became the most involved member of her own family in future Lubin productions.

== Evolution of the genre ==
Several of the later films featured young women rather than children, such as American Mutuscope & Biograph's Fight in the Dormitory (1904). Some critics have discussed how the genre evolve toward encouraging voyeuristic pleasure in watching women tussle in bed.

== Cast ==
- Emily Lubin
- Marguerite Sessler
