= Gun Gospel =

1927 film

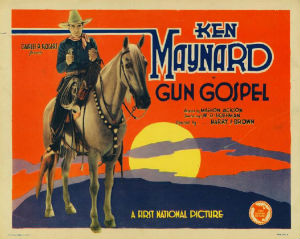
- Theatrical release poster
- Directed by: Harry Joe Brown
- Screenplay by: Marion Jackson; Don Ryan
- Based on: Gun Gospel by William Dawson Hoffman
- Starring: Ken Maynard; Virginia Brown Faire; Romaine Fielding; Bob Fleming; J. P. McGowan; Jerry Madden
- Cinematography: Sol Polito
- Production company: Charles R. Rogers Productions
- Distributed by: First National Pictures
- Release date: November 6, 1927
- Running time: 70 minutes
- Country: United States
- Languages: Silent; English intertitles

Gun Gospel is a 1927 American silent Western film directed by Harry Joe Brown and written by Marion Jackson and Don Ryan. It is based on the 1926 novel Gun Gospel by William Dawson Hoffman. The film stars Ken Maynard, Virginia Brown Faire, Romaine Fielding, Bob Fleming, J. P. McGowan and Jerry Madden. The film was released on November 6, 1927, by First National Pictures.

== Cast ==
- Ken Maynard as Granger Hume
- Virginia Brown Faire as Mary Carrol
- Romaine Fielding as Richard Carrol
- Bob Fleming as 'Dad' Walker
- J. P. McGowan as Bill Brogan
- Jerry Madden as Fielding's Son
- Noah Young as Jack Goodshot
- William J. Dyer as Sheriff
- Slim Whitaker as Brogan's Henchman
- Tarzan as Tarzan
