= Gladys Brockwell =

American actress (1894–1929)

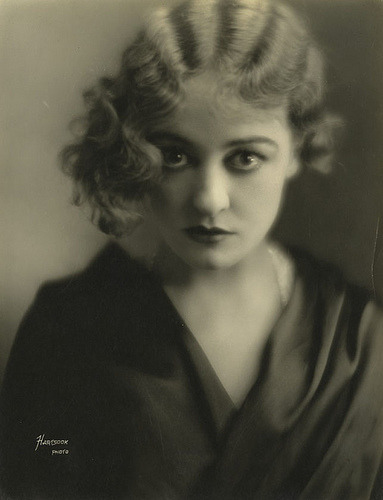
- Brockwell, c. 1920
- Born: Gladys Lindeman; September 26, 1894; Brooklyn, New York, U.S.
- Died: July 2, 1929 (aged 34); Hollywood, California, U.S.
- Occupation: Actress
- Years active: 1913–1929
- Spouses: Robert B. Broadwell (m. 1915; div. 1918) Harry Edwards (m. 1918; ann. 1919)
- Mother: Billie Brockwell

Gladys Brockwell (née Lindeman; September 26, 1894 – July 2, 1929) was an American actress whose career began during the silent film era.

== Early life and career ==
Brockwell was born Gladys Lindeman in Brooklyn, New York, on September 26, 1894. Her father was H.R. Lindeman. Her mother, Lillian Lindeman (née Voltaire), a chorus girl turned actress, put her daughter on stage at an early age. By age 7, Brockwell was performing in dramatic productions with a stock company in Williamsport, West Virginia. By the time Gladys was 14, she played leading roles, and when she was 17 she had her own company. She took on the stage name Gladys Brockwell, and made her film debut in 1913 for Lubin Studios. Within a short time she was starring in a number of films. Developing her craft, she moved to Hollywood where she garnered a role in the acclaimed 1922 version of Oliver Twist and in The Hunchback of Notre Dame the following year.

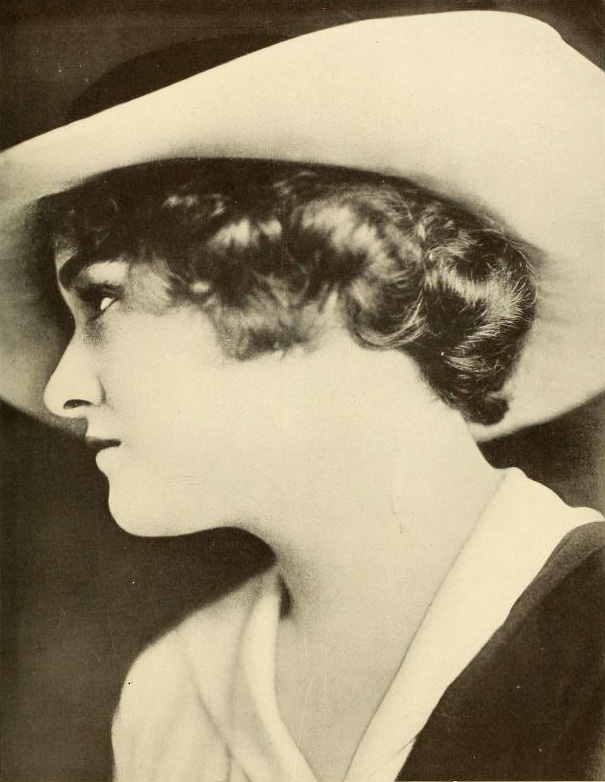
Gladys Brockwell (1917)

Her mother Lillian took to the screen in 1914 and also adopted the surname Brockwell, first as Lillian Brockwell then as Billie Brockwell, achieving fame in her own right but after her daughter. The name Brockwell appears to be a corruption of Gladys' fiance's surname, Broadwell but may stem from a remarriage of Lillian around 1907 or 1908, with both mother and daughter taking a new surname.

By the mid-1920s, she was past the age of 30 and although still given top female billing, Brockwell performed mainly in supporting roles. Regarded as one of the finest character actresses of the day who not only adapted to sound films but excelled in them, her first appearance in a "talkie" came in 1928 in Lights of New York. Her performance received strong reviews at the time of the film's release as well as by present-day critics of the preserved film.

A Warner Bros. feature-length production, Lights of New York was filmed with microphones strategically hidden around the sets, creating the first motion picture released with fully synchronic dialogue. She was then signed by Warner Bros. and was looking forward to continued success in talkies. She died in an automobile accident in 1929.

== Personal life ==
Brockwell married actor Robert B. Broadwell on March 3, 1915. They separated on September 1, 1915, due to "Much quarreling and unpleasantness generally," as she told the court when she sought a divorce in March 1918. "We never seemed to agree on anything," she added. Los Angeles Judge Jackson granted her divorce decree on March 13, 1918, on grounds of desertion.

On July 1, 1918, she married Harry Edwards, a film director, but the marriage was annulled the next year.

== Death ==
Brockwell died in Hollywood Hospital in Los Angeles on July 2, 1929, of peritonitis that resulted from internal injuries from an automobile accident.

On June 27, 1929, Brockwell and a friend, Thomas Stanely Brennan, were involved in an automobile accident near Calabasas, California. Brennan, a Los Angeles advertising man, was driving when the automobile went over a 75-foot (23 m) embankment on the Ventura Highway near Calabasas. Brockwell was crushed beneath the automobile.

She underwent four blood transfusions as part of the effort to save her life, the last just before her death. Following a second blood transfusion, Brockwell appeared to improve until peritonitis set in from her internal injuries, particularly a puncture of her large intestine. Brennan recovered after sustaining serious injuries. He said a bit of dust had blown into his eye, temporarily blinding him. No negligence was placed on Brennan, who was still recovering in the hospital. Brockwell's final film, The Drake Case, was directed by Edward Laemmle while she was on loan to Universal Pictures, and was released posthumously in September 1929.

Gladys Brockwell was cremated at Hollywood Cemetery and her ashes given to her mother. Her ashes now lie with her mother in the columbarium of Inglewood Park Cemetery.

== Selected filmography ==
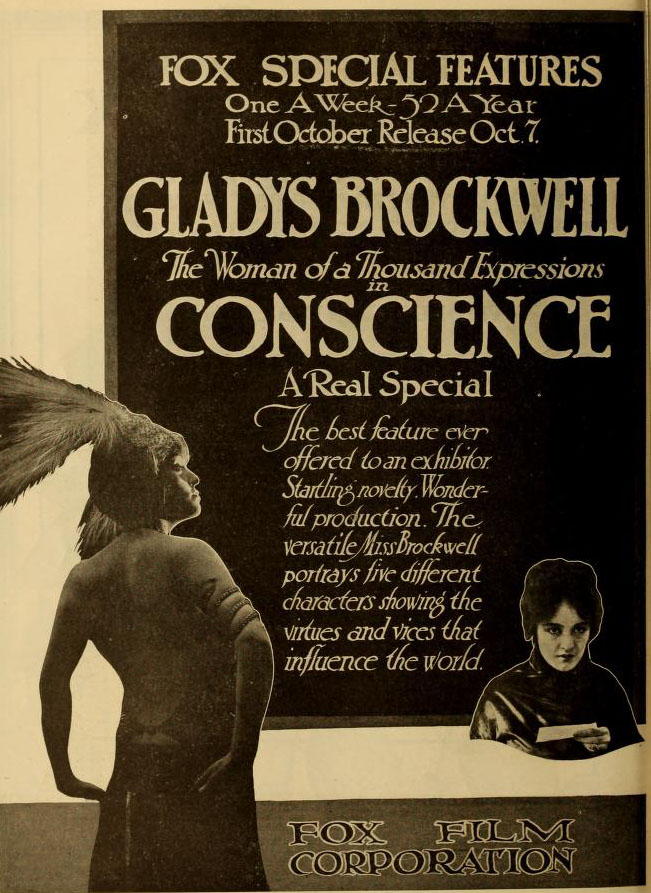
Conscience (1917)

| Year | Title | Role | Notes |
|---|---|---|---|
| 1913 | The Rattlesnake | Tony's sister | Incomplete film |
| 1913 | When Mountain and Valley Meet | Beth | |
| 1913 | His Blind Power | | |
| 1914 | The Geisha | | |
| 1914 | The Last of the Line | | |
| 1914 | One of the Discard | Flora | |
| 1914 | A Political Feud | Helen Kent | |
| 1914 | A Relic of Old Japan | Annette Walsh | |
| 1914 | Stacked Cards | Edna Johnson | |
| 1914 | The Typhoon | Helene | |
| 1914 | The Worth of a Life | Ruby Baker | |
| 1915 | A Confidence Game | | |
| 1915 | Double Trouble | Daisy Scarlett | |
| 1915 | Up from the Depths | Daire Vincent | |
| 1915 | A Man and His Mate | Betty | |
| 1915 | On the Night Stage | Saloon girl | |
| 1915 | Providence and the Twins | Miss Abagail Dean | |
| 1916 | The Crippled Hand | The Prima Donna | |
| 1916 | The End of the Trail | Adrienne Cabot | |
| 1916 | The Fires of Conscience | Margery Burke | |
| 1916 | Sins of Her Parent | Adrian Gardiner / Valerie Marchmont | |
| 1917 | A Branded Soul | Conchita Cordova | Lost film |
| 1917 | Her Temptation | Shirley Moreland | |
| 1917 | The Honor System | Trixie Bennett | Lost film |
| 1917 | The Price of Her Soul | Ailene Graham | |
| 1917 | The Soul of Satan | Miriam Lee | |
| 1918 | The Bird of Prey | Adele Durant | |
| 1918 | The Devil's Wheel | Blanche De Montfort | |
| 1918 | Her One Mistake | Harriet Gordon / Peggy Malone | |
| 1918 | Kultur | Countess Griselda von Arenburg | Lost film |
| 1918 | The Moral Law | Isobel de Costa / Anita de Costa | |
| 1918 | The Scarlet Road | Mabel Halloway | |
| 1918 | The Strange Woman | Inez de Pierrefond | |
| 1919 | Broken Commandments | Nella Banard | |
| 1919 | The Call of the Soul | Barbara Deming | |
| 1919 | Chasing Rainbows | Sadie | |
| 1919 | The Divorce Trap | Eleanor Burton | |
| 1919 | The Forbidden Room | Ruth Lester | |
| 1919 | Pitfalls of a Big City | Molly Moore | |
| 1919 | The Sneak | Rhona | |
| 1919 | Thieves | Mazie Starrett | |
| 1920 | Flames of the Flesh | Candace | Lost film |
| 1920 | The Mother of His Children | Princess Yve | Lost film |
| 1920 | A Sister to Salome | Elinore Duane | |
| 1921 | The Sage Hen | The Sage Hen | |
| 1922 | Oliver Twist | Nancy | |
| 1922 | Double Stakes | | |
| 1922 | Paid Back | Carol Gordon | |
| 1923 | The Hunchback of Notre Dame | Sister Gudule | |
| 1923 | The Drug Traffic | Edna Moore | |
| 1923 | Penrod and Sam | Mrs. Schofield | |
| 1923 | The Darling of New York | Light Fingered Kitty | Lost film, only the last reel survives |
| 1924 | The Foolish Virgin | Nancy Owens | Lost film |
| 1924 | So Big | Maartje Poole | Lost film |
| 1924 | Unmarried Wives | Mrs. Gregory | |
| 1925 | Chickie | Jennie | Lost film |
| 1925 | Stella Maris | Louisa Risca | |
| 1925 | The Ancient Mariner | Life In Death | Lost film |
| 1925 | The Reckless Sex | Mrs. Garcia | |
| 1926 | The Skyrocket | Rose Kimm (prologue) | Lost film |
| 1926 | Her Sacrifice | Mary Cullen | |
| 1926 | Twinkletoes | Cissie Lightfoot | |
| 1926 | The Last Frontier | Cynthia Jaggers | |
| 1926 | Spangles | Mademoiselle Dazie | |
| 1927 | Long Pants | His Mother | |
| 1927 | The Country Doctor | Myra Jones | |
| 1927 | Man, Woman and Sin | Mrs. Whitcomb | |
| 1927 | 7th Heaven | Nana | |
| 1928 | A Girl in Every Port | Madame Flore | |
| 1928 | My Home Town | Mae Andrews | |
| 1928 | Hollywood Bound | Hollywood Leading Lady | short; Vitaphone sound |
| 1928 | The Home Towners | Lottie Bancroft | Lost film |
| 1928 | Lights of New York | Molly Thompson | |
| 1928 | The Woman Disputed | Countess | |
| 1928 | The Law and the Man | Margaret Grayson | |
| 1929 | From Headquarters | Mary Dyer | Lost film |
| 1929 | The Hottentot | Mrs. Chadwick | Lost film |
| 1929 | The Argyle Case | Mrs. Martin | Lost film, but the sound to reels 3, 5, 7, and 9 survive |
| 1929 | Hardboiled Rose | Julie Malo | The soundtrack is lost except for the fourth reel disc |
| 1929 | The Drake Case | Lulu Marks | |

== Sources ==
- Albert Lea (Minnesota) Evening Tribune, "Gladys Brockwell, Picture Actress, Dies of Injuries", (Wednesday, July 3, 1929) page 1
- The New York Times, "Gladys Brockwell Dies" (July 3, 1929) page 14
