= Kultur (film) =

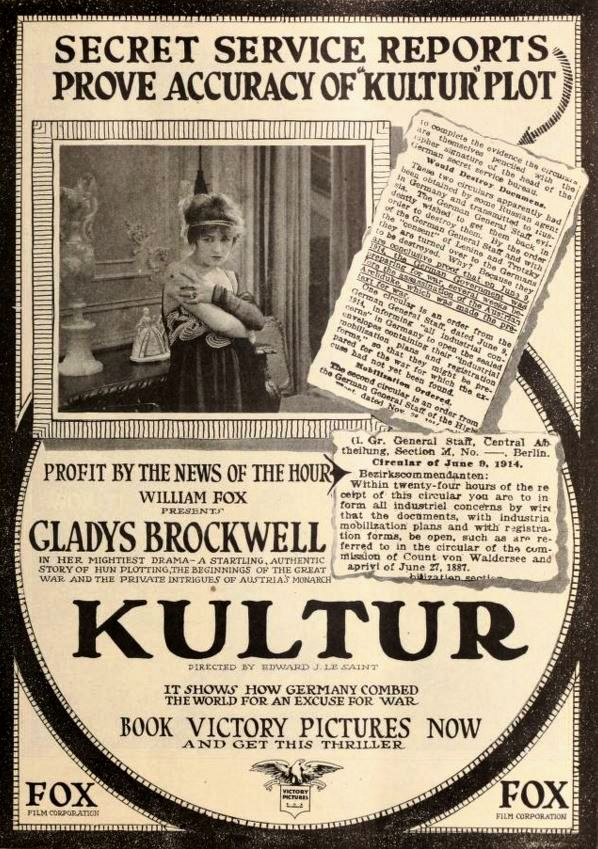
- Promotional advertisement
- Directed by: Edward J. Le Sainte
- Written by: J. Grubb Alexander, Fred Myton
- Starring: Gladys Brockwell
- Production company: Fox Film
- Release date: September 22, 1918
- Running time: 6 reels
- Country: United States

Kultur is a 1918 American silent film directed by Edward J. Le Sainte starring Gladys Brockwell in the lead role as Countess Griselda Von Arenburg. No copies of the film are known to exist per the Library of Congress.

== Plot ==
The film tells of a German plot to start the First World War, with the Kaiser's mistress asking her servant to assassinate Archduke Franz Ferdinand and the subsequent cover-up that ensues.

== Cast ==
- Gladys Brockwell as Countess Griselda, the Emperor's mistress
- Georgia Woodthrope
- William Scott as René, the Frenchman
- Willard Louis as Baron von Zeller
- Charles Clary as Archduke Franz Ferdinand
- Nigel de Brulier as Griselda's servant
- William Burress
- Alfred Fremont
