= Hogan's Romance Upset =

1915 film

- Directed by: Charles Avery
- Produced by: Mack Sennett
- Starring: Charles Murray
- Release date: February 13, 1915
- Running time: 11 minutes
- Country: United States
- Languages: Silent; English intertitles

Hogan's Romance Upset is a 1915 American short comedy film directed by Charles Avery and featuring both Fatty Arbuckle and Harold Lloyd in uncredited roles as spectators. The film is extant.

== Cast ==
- Charles Murray as Hogan
- Bobby Dunn as Weary Willie
- Louise Fazenda
- Ben Turpin
- Ted Edwards as Athletic Club Member
- Vivian Edwards
- Billy Gilbert
- Frank Hayes
- Charles Lakin as Athletic Club Member
- Josef Swickard
- Roscoe "Fatty" Arbuckle as Fight Spectator (uncredited)
- Billie Brockwell as Bit Role (uncredited)
- Charley Chase as Bit Role (uncredited)
- Harold Lloyd as Fight Spectator (uncredited)
- Ford Sterling as Fight Spectator (uncredited)
- Al St. John as Bit Role (uncredited)
- Mack Swain as Fight Spectator (uncredited)

== See also ==
- List of American films of 1915
- Fatty Arbuckle filmography
- Harold Lloyd filmography
