= The Yiddisher Boy =

1909 film by Siegmund Lubin

The Yiddisher Boy is a 1909 film directed by Sigmund Lubin.

== Plot ==
The plot is about a boy called Moses who lives on the Lower East Side of New York City and helps support his family by selling papers. When one of the other newsboys tries to rob Moses, Ed comes to his rescue. Moses invites Ed over for Shabbat dinner. When Ed is run down by a passing bicycle, Moses visits his friend in the hospital and uses his last pennies to help him. Years later Moses is a successful merchant, and Ed, down on his luck, comes looking for a job. Moses recognizes his old friend and offers him the best job he has.
