= The Gambler's Charm =

- Produced by: Lubin Manufacturing Company
- Distributed by: General Film Company
- Release date: November 10, 1910
- Running time: short; split reel with The Mystery of the Torn Note
- Country: USA
- Language: Silent

The Gambler's Charm is a 1910 silent short film drama produced by the Lubin Manufacturing Company and distributed through General Film Company.

A print is preserved at the Library of Congress in their collection.

== See also ==
- List of American films of 1910
