= The Law and the Man =

1928 film

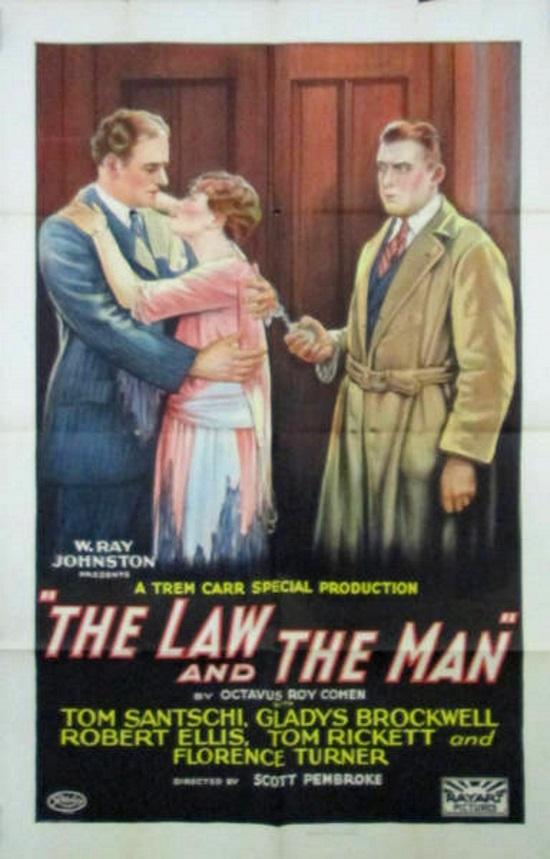
- Directed by: Scott Pembroke
- Written by: Octavus Roy Cohen (story); Arthur Hoerl
- Produced by: Trem Carr; W. Ray Johnston
- Starring: Tom Santschi; Gladys Brockwell; Robert Ellis
- Cinematography: Hap Depew
- Edited by: Charles A. Post
- Production company: Trem Carr Pictures
- Distributed by: Rayart Pictures
- Release date: January 31, 1928
- Running time: 60 minutes
- Country: United States
- Languages: Silent; English intertitles

The Law and the Man is a 1928 American silent drama film directed by Scott Pembroke and starring Tom Santschi, Gladys Brockwell and Robert Ellis.

== Cast ==
- Tom Santschi as Dan Creedoon
- Gladys Brockwell as Margaret Grayson
- Robert Ellis as Ernest Vane
- Tom Ricketts as Quintus Newton
- Florence Turner as Miss Blair
- James Cain as Jimmy
- Henry Roquemore as Stanley Hudson

== Bibliography ==
- Ken Wlaschin. Silent Mystery and Detective Movies: A Comprehensive Filmography. McFarland, 2009.
