= The Hidden Bankroll =

- Produced by: Lubin Manufacturing Company
- Distributed by: General Film Company
- Release date: July 18, 1913
- Running time: 1 reel; in-split reel form with When Mary Married
- Country: USA
- Language: Silent

The Hidden Bankroll is a 1913 short comedy silent film produced by the Lubin Manufacturing Company. The film was released in split-reel with another Lubin film When Mary Married.

The film is preserved in the Library of Congress collection.
