= George Clancey =

American actor (1881–1921)

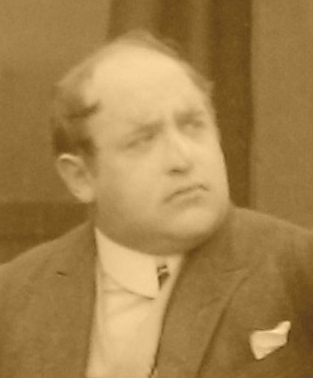
- Clancey as Alexander the Great in Lord Loveland Discovers America
- Born: 9 November 1881; St. Louis, Missouri, United States
- Died: 13 November 1921 (aged 40); Cairo, Illinois, United States
- Occupation: Actor
- Years active: 1912 - 1916

George Clancey (9 November 1881 – 13 November 1921) was an American actor of the silent era. He appeared in several films.

Clancey was born on 9 November 1881 in St. Louis, Missouri to John Clancy and Lucy Lumpkins. He starred in several silent films, most of them with the American Film Company of Santa Barbara. He is best known for playing the character of a restaurant owner nicknamed Alexander the Great in the 1916 Arthur Maude movie Lord Loveland Discovers America. He also played the character Hook Barnacle in several of the 15 episodes of the adventure serial The Secret of the Submarine. He married May Cornell, and died on 13 November 1921 in Cairo, Illinois.

== Filmography ==
- The Sheriff's Prisoner (1912)
- The Cringer (1912)
- Chief White Eagle (1912)
- The Power of Silence (1912)
- The Secret of the Submarine (1915)
- Curly (1915)
- Lord Loveland Discovers America (1916)
- A Gay Blade's Last Scrape (1916)
- Snow Stuff (1916)
- The Stinger Stung (1916)
