= Billie Brockwell =

American film actress (1875–1949)

Lillian "Billie" Brockwell (née Voltaire; February 1, 1875 – January 30, 1949) was an early 20th-century American actress and scriptwriter.

== Career ==
After performing as a chorus girl in vaudeville, Brockwell entered the film industry in 1913, aged 38, and was continually cast as either a wife or mother. She appeared mainly in one-reel films that took around a week to produce. Her work for Keystone included Hogan Out West (1915) and The Village Vampire (1916).

She returned to films in 1929 following the death of her daughter, actress Gladys Brockwell, in an automobile accident.

== Personal life ==
Brockwell married H. R. Lindeman and had a daughter, Gladys Brockwell, who became an actress.

The Brockwells performed together in 1912 productions by a company sponsored by the San Joaquin Valley Theatrical Managers' Association. Gladys was the leading woman, and Lillian portrayed a dance-hall girl.

== Death ==
She died of arterosclerosis on January 30, 1949, in Westwood, Los Angeles, two days before her 74th birthday. She was cremated and her remains are in the columbarium at Inglewood Park Cemetery on the outskirts of Los Angeles.

== Film Roles ==
- The Rattlesnake (1913) as Tony's mother (appearing as Lillian Brockwell)
- His Blind Power (1913) (appearing as Lillian Brockwell)
- Women and Roses (1914) as Wallace's mother (appearing as Lillian Brockwell)
- The Siren (1914) as Renee's mother (appearing as Lillian Brockwell)
- Den of Thieves (1914) as Lillian (appearing as Lillian Brockwell)
- The Plumber (1914) as Mrs Felix
- Ambrose's First Falsehood (1914) as a Floozie
- Droppington's Family Tree (1915) as Mrs Droppington
- Hogan's Wild Oates (1915) as Hogan's wife
- Only a Messenger Boy (1915) as the Mayor's wife
- When Ambrose Dared Walrus (1915) as Walrus's wife
- A Hash House Fraud (1915) as the buyer's wife
- These College Girls (1915) as the Headmistress
- Gussle's Wayward Path (1915) as a Minister
- The Village Vampire (1916) as the Adventuress
- The Rent Jumpers (1915) as the Landlord's wife
- His Luckless Love (1915) as the Wife
- Love in Armor (1915) as a Party Guest with Charley Chase
- Hogan Out West (1915) as Cactus Kate
- Hogan's Aristocratic Dream (1915) as the Queen
- Hogan's Romance Upset (1915) as the Love interest
- Hogan, the Porter (1915) as wife of a Guest Receiving a Trunk
- Hogan's Mussy Job (1915) as Wife in Apartment Below
- Fatty and Mabel at the San Diego Exposition (1915) as a street crown participant (uncredited)
- The Little Teacher (1915)
- Hash House Mashers (1915) as the mother actress
- Love Will Conquer (1916) as the Faded Vampire
- Linda (1929) as Mrs Stillwater, Linda's mother

== Scriptwriter ==
She wrote under the name of Lillian V. Brockwell.

- A Law Unto Himself (1916)
