= A Hash House Fraud =

1915 film by Charley Chase

A Hash House Fraud (1915)

A Hash House Fraud is a 1915 film short (16 minute) directed by Charley Chase featuring the Keystone Cops.

A "hash house" is an early 20th century American term for a cheap eating house. The film possibly gave birth to the term riot squad.

== Plot ==
The action takes place at the Busy Bee Beanery, a small cafe where a notice asks "Don't Flirt with the Cashier". The cashier is arguing with the owner. A Chaplin-esque customer arrives, downs some sauce, and sits staring at the cashier. The cashier is chewing gum and the customer gets her to stretch it far enough that he can steal a bit to eat.

Two large plates arrive but the food is too rubbery to eat. The owner calls the chef and hits him with the food when he appears at the serving hatch. The chef then traps the owners head by sliding the hatch and gets a frying pan to go round and scald the owners backside. The cashier rescues the boss.

A new customer arrives and orders a frankfurter sandwich. The chef says he has none so the owner puts his finger in a glove and puts it in a bun. He shows the customer then withdraws his finger as he puts it down. The customer complains and the owner claims he ate it. The customer stomps off without paying.

The cashier shows the owner the empty cash drawer. The owner goes to try to sell his business while the chef flirts with the cashier. The owner brings back enough men to fill the cafe, offering them a free meal. The cashier is told to ring up $1 each time one leaves even though they pay nothing. A prospective buyer and his wife are fooled into thinking that business is good and offer to buy the cafe. The buyer goes to the kitchen and counts out his cash. He tells the cashier she can stay and his wife starts to get annoyed. The wife takes over as cashier and the original cashier goes to the kitchen to collect her wages.

However, the new buyer's wife does not let the remaining customers leave without paying. The customers explain the deal they were offered and the buyer tries to get the owner who is hiding in the kitchen. The chef defends the door with two meat cleavers. A fight breaks out in the cafe. The wife goes outside and calls over two policemen. At the same time the buyer uses a telephone to call the Keystone Cops in their police station. He asks for the riot squad.

The two nearby police enter first. The owner and cashier escape by the kitchen door and go to the front. He tries to crank start the buyer's roadster. Once it starts the cashier jumps in and they speed off. The Keystone Cops arrive in their car and the angry crowd tell them to chase the stolen car. They give chase firing their revolvers in the air. The cars pass each other repeatedly then the roadster hits the end of the pier and owner and cashier are thrown into the sea by the inertia.

The Cops the chef the buyer and his wife assemble on the pier and throw the cashier a lifeline. She is pulled out. The buyer hugs his wife and the chef hugs the cashier. The owner is not seen again.

== Characters ==
see

- Hugh Fay as the owner
- Louise Fazenda as the cashier
- Fritz Schade as the chef
- Don Barclay as Chaplinesue customer (uncredited)
- Harry Bernard as the prospective purchaser
- Billie Brockwell as the buyer's wife
- Chester Conklin as police chief
- Harold J. Binney as first customer
- Fred Fishback as second customer
- Billy Gilbert as third customer
- Glen Cavender as policeman (uncredited)
- Charles Lakin as policeman (uncredited)
