= List of American films of 1910 =

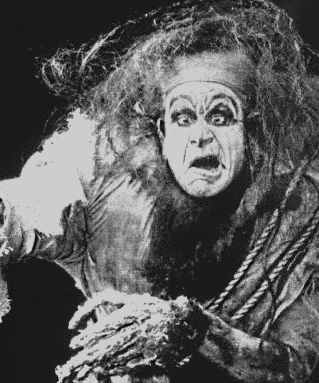
Still from Frankenstein

More than 1,545 American films were released in 1910.

| Title | Director | Cast | Genre | Notes |
|---|---|---|---|---|
| Abraham Lincoln's Clemency | Theodore Wharton | Leopold Wharton | | |
| Alice's Adventures in Wonderland | Edwin S. Porter | Gladys Hulette | Fantasy | |
| An Arcadian Maid | D. W. Griffith | Mary Pickford, Mack Sennett | Drama | |
| As It Is In Life | D. W. Griffith | George Nichols, Gladys Egan, Mary Pickford | Romantic drama | |
| A Christmas Carol | J. Searle Dawley | Marc McDermott, Charles Stanton Ogle | | |
| The Courtship of Miles Standish | Hobart Bosworth | Robert Z. Leonard | Drama | |
| The Englishman and the Girl | D. W. Griffith | Charles Craig, Mary Pickford | Comedy | |
| Frankenstein | J. Searle Dawley | Augustus Phillips, Charles Stanton Ogle, Mary Fuller | | First film adaptation of Mary Shelley's Frankenstein |
| The Fugitive | D. W. Griffith | Kate Bruce, Edward Dillon | Drama | |
| The Gambler's Charm | | | Drama | |
| Gentleman Joe | | Harry Carey | | |
| Hemlock Hoax, the Detective | | | Comedy | |
| The House with Closed Shutters | D. W. Griffith | Henry B. Walthall | Drama | |
| In Old California | D. W. Griffith | Frank Powell, Arthur V. Johnson, Marion Leonard, Henry B. Walthall | Melodrama | First movie shot in Hollywood |
| In the Border States | D. W. Griffith | Charles West | Drama | |
| Jeffries-Johnson World's Championship Boxing Contest | | Jack Johnson, James J. Jeffries | Documentary | J & J Co. |
| The Lad from Old Ireland | Sidney Olcott | Sidney Olcott, Gene Gauntier, Thomas O'Connor | Drama | |
| Pocahontas | | Anna Rosemond, George Barnes, Frank H. Crane | Short fantasy | |
| Pride of the Range | Francis Boggs | Tom Mix | Western | First onscreen role for Hoot Gibson |
| Ramona | D. W. Griffith | Mary Pickford, Henry B. Walthall | Drama | |
| The Rocky Road | D. W. Griffith | Frank Powell, Stephanie Longfellow | Drama | |
| Roosevelt in Africa | Cherry Kearton | Theodore Roosevelt | Documentary | |
| Rose O'Salem-Town | D. W. Griffith | Henry B. Walthall | Drama short | |
| The Sanitarium | | Roscoe "Fatty" Arbuckle | Comedy | |
| Twelfth Night | Eugene Mullin, Charles Kent | Julia Swayne Gordon, Charles Kent, Florence Turner | Romantic Comedy | |
| The Two Brothers | D. W. Griffith | Arthur V. Johnson | Western | |
| The Unchanging Sea | D. W. Griffith | Arthur V. Johnson | Drama | |
| What the Daisy Said | D. W. Griffith | Clara T. Bracy, Mary Pickford, Mack Sennett | | |
| White Fawn's Devotion | James Young Deer | Lucille Young | Drama | |
| Wilful Peggy | D. W. Griffith | Mary Pickford | Drama | |
| The Woman from Mellon's | D. W. Griffith | Billy Quirk, Mary Pickford | | |
| The Wonderful Wizard of Oz | Otis Turner (unconfirmed) | Bebe Daniels | | |

== See also ==
- 1910 in the United States
