= Gentleman Joe (film) =

- Starring: Harry Carey
- Release date: 1910
- Country: United States
- Language: Silent with English intertitles

Gentleman Joe is a 1910 American film. It stars Harry Carey in his second onscreen role.

== Cast ==
- Harry Carey

== See also ==
- List of American films of 1910
- 1910 in film
