= The Little Teacher (1915 film) =

1915 film

- Directed by: Mack Sennett
- Produced by: Mack Sennett
- Starring: Mabel Normand; Fatty Arbuckle; Mack Sennett; Owen Moore
- Release date: June 21, 1915
- Running time: 21 minutes
- Country: United States
- Languages: Silent; English intertitles

The Little Teacher is a 1915 American short comedy film starring Mabel Normand and Fatty Arbuckle, and directed by Mack Sennett. The film is extant.

== Cast ==
- Mabel Normand as The Little Teacher
- Roscoe "Fatty" Arbuckle as Fat Student
- Mack Sennett as Tall Student
- Bobby Dunn
- Owen Moore as Teacher's Fiancé
- Billie Brockwell (uncredited)
- Vivian Edwards (uncredited)
- Frank Hayes (uncredited)
- Frank Opperman (uncredited)
