= The Secret of the Submarine =

1915 film

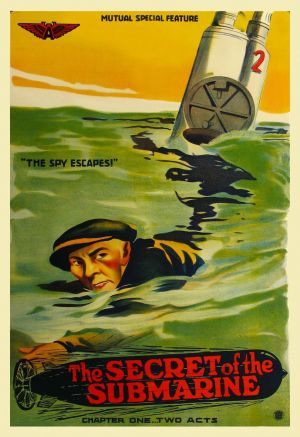
- Film poster
- Directed by: George L. Sargent
- Written by: Richard Barry
- Starring: Juanita Hansen; Tom Chatterton
- Production company: American Film Company
- Distributed by: Mutual Film
- Release date: May 22, 1916
- Country: United States
- Language: Silent with English intertitles

The Secret of the Submarine is a 1916 American adventure film serial directed by George L. Sargent. It was 15 chapters and all of them are considered to be lost.

== Plot ==
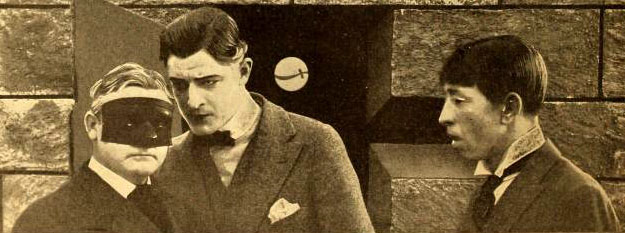
Advertisement (1916)

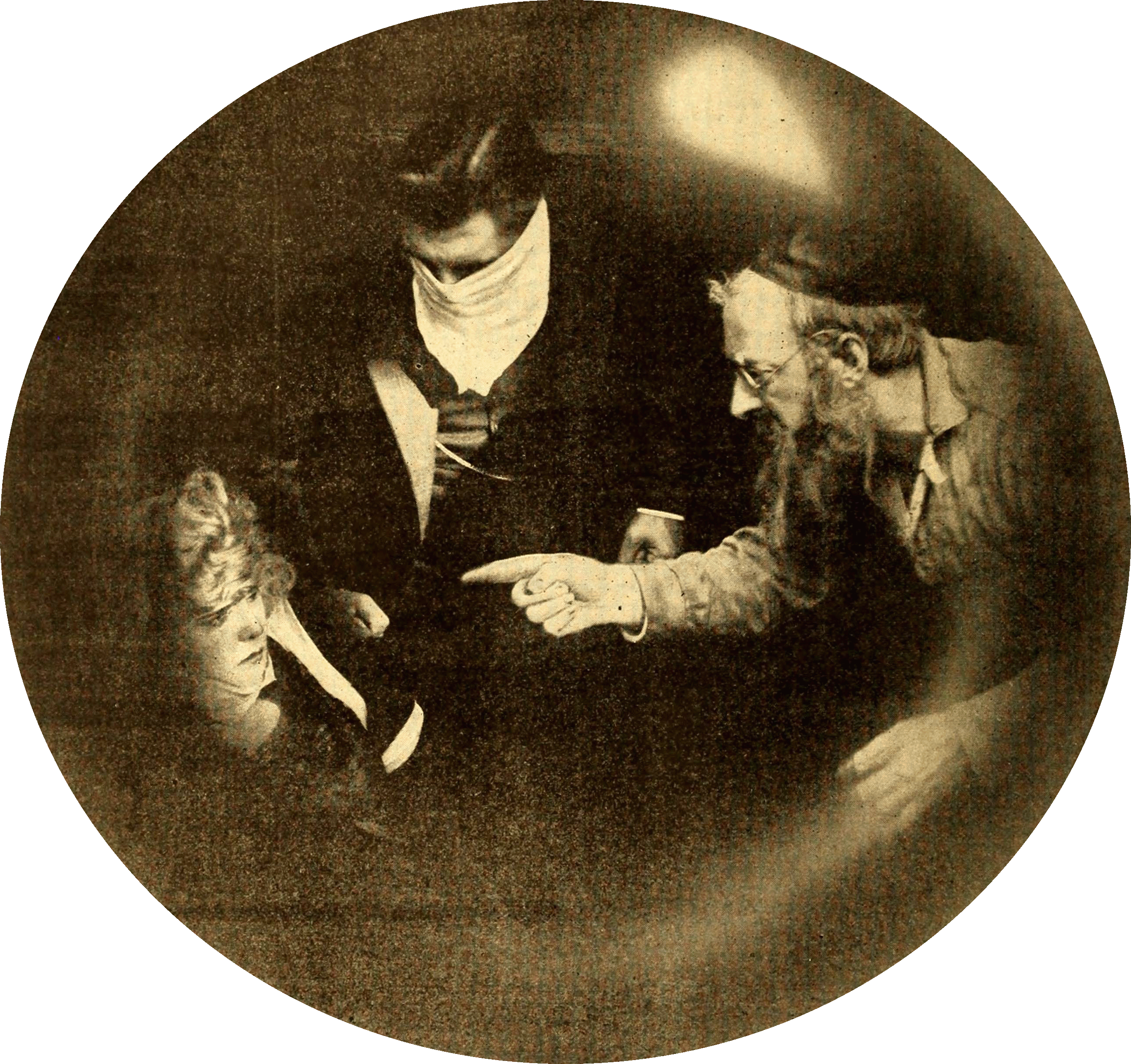
Film still from Chapter 4 (1916)

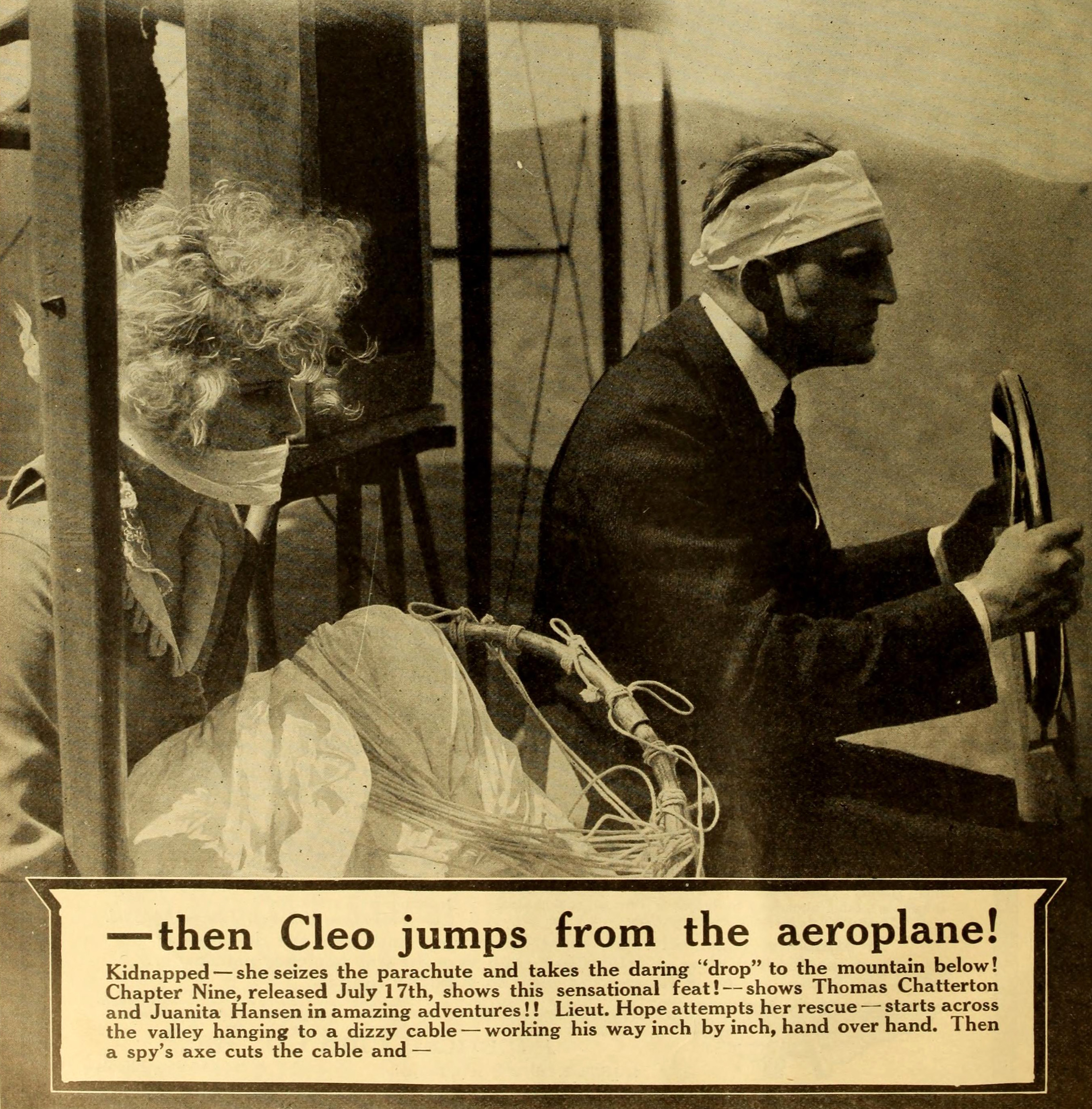
Advertisement (1916). The caption incorrectly states Thomas Chatterton is the pilot of the plane but the actor pictured is Lamar Johnstone.

The heroes must keep the titular submarine from falling into the hands of the Russians or Japanese.

== Cast ==
- Juanita Hansen as Cleo Burke. This was Juanita Hansen's serial debut.
- Tom Chatterton as Lt. Jarvis Hope
- Hylda Hollis as Olga Ivanoff
- Lamar Johnstone as Gerald Morton
- George Clancey as Hook Barnacle
- William Tedmarsh as Tatsuma
- Harry Edmondson as Sextus
- George Webb as Mahlin
- Hugh Bennett as Dr. Ralph Burke
- Joseph Beaudry as Calvin Montgomery
- Perry Banks
- Leona Hutton
- George Gebhardt

== Production ==
The Secret of the Submarine was written in the lead up to the United States' involvement in World War I by war correspondent Richard Barry. The serial was released 15 days after the Lusitania was torpedoed by a German sub.

== See also ==
- List of film serials
- List of film serials by studio
