= Stop Thief! (1915 film) =

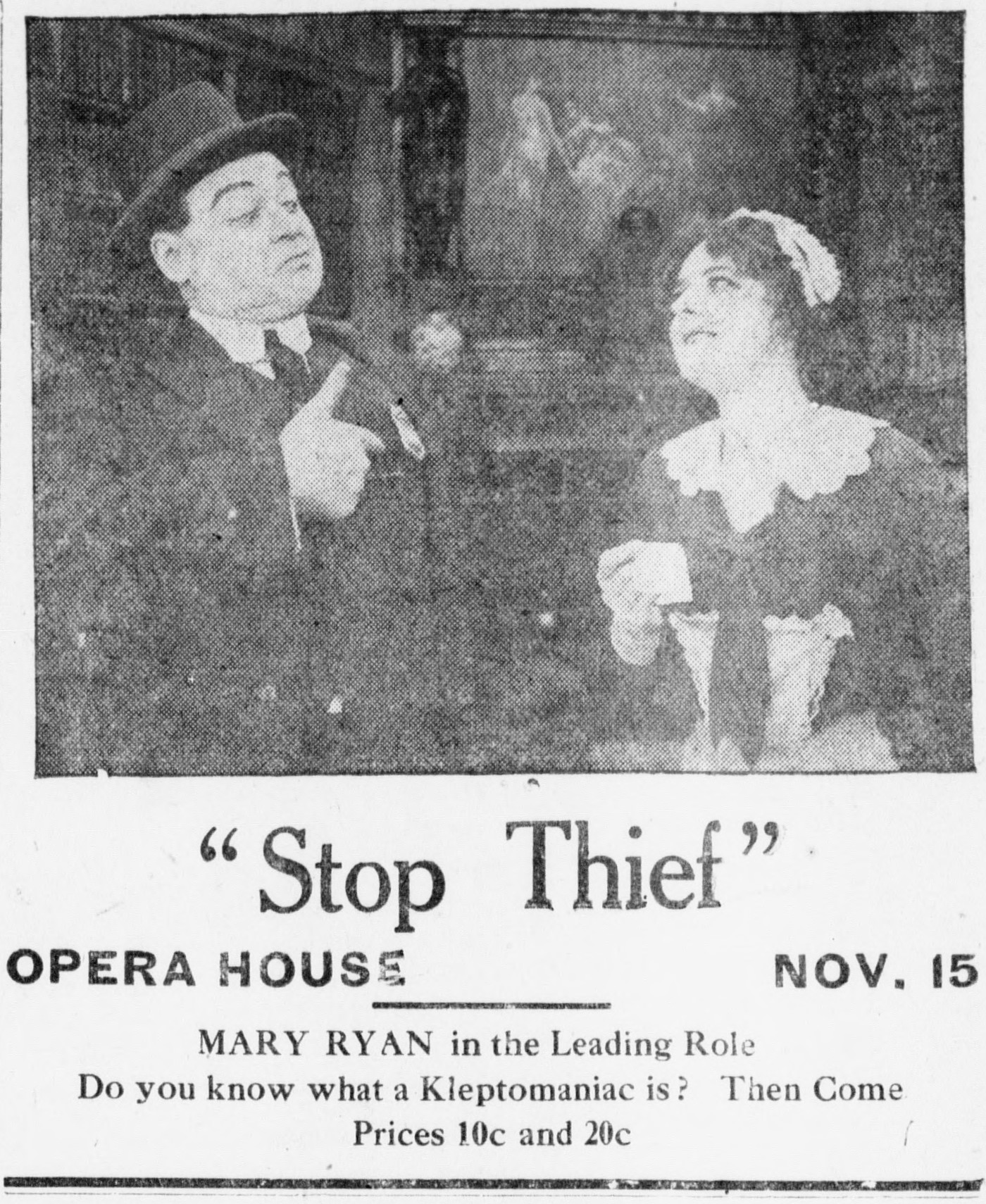
- Newspaper advertisement
- Directed by: George Fitzmaurice
- Based on: play, Stop Thief!, by Carlyle Moore
- Produced by: George Kleine
- Starring: Mary Ryan
- Cinematography: Edward Horn
- Distributed by: Kleine-Edison
- Release date: February 15, 1915
- Running time: 5 reels

Stop Thief! is a lost 1915 American silent comedy drama film directed by George Fitzmaurice and starring Mary Ryan. It was produced by George Kleine and released through Kleine and Edison.

== Cast ==
- Mary Ryan - Nell Jones
- Harry Mestayer - Jack Doogan
- William "Stage" Boyd - Dr. Willoughby
- Harold Howard - Mr. Cluney
- Albert Tavernier - Mr. Carr
- Augusta Burmeister - Mrs. Carr
- Della Connor - Joan Carr
- Marguerite Boyd - Madge Carr
