= Meet Me at the Fountain =

- Directed by: Siegmund Lubin
- Produced by: Siegmund Lubin
- Starring: Gilbert Sarony
- Cinematography: Siegmund Lubin
- Release date: 1904
- Running time: 5 minutes 34 seconds
- Country: United States of America
- Languages: Silent; English intertitles

Meet Me at the Fountain is a 1904 American silent short comedy film written, produced, and directed by Siegmund Lubin. Actors in the movie included Gilbert Sarony, a well-known cross-dressing performer. The film was inspired by Wallace McCutcheon's 1904 film Personal.

== Plot ==
The film starts with a title reading 'A remake of "Personal" in which a man advertises in the newspaper for a wife, asking interested parties to "meet me at the fountain"'. It is followed by a middle close-up of the man drafting the advertisement, a middle shot of the man posting it, and again a middle close-up of the man getting ready in front of a mirror. This is followed by a full shot of the man waiting at the meeting point in front of a fountain. First comes a nanny, pushing a baby stroller. He bows low and wants to kiss the baby but she pushes him away.

Meet Me at the Fountain: streetcar shot

A number of women arrive, he begins to greet them but when they become too insistent, he runs away, chased by the group of women. He catches a streetcar, jumps over a fence, runs up a flight of stairs, climbs up a tree, then a wall but they keep following him. He finally falls into a river where one of the ladies follows him and helps him get out of the water, she is the winner.

The film ends with a medium close-up of the bride and bridegroom all dressed up, which reveals that the bride is actually a man dressed as a woman. The two men French kiss.

== Production and analysis ==
This is the third film shot in the United States in 1904 showing a man placing an advertisement in order to get married and ending up being chased by a group of women. The first was Personal, directed by Wallace McCutcheon Sr., for the Biograph Company and the second was a remake, How a French Nobleman Got a Wife Through the New York Herald Personal Columns, directed by Edwin S. Porter for the Edison Manufacturing Company.

Meet Me at the Fountain: Bride and bridegroom

Siegmund Lubin, who was trained as an optometrist and had built his own camera and projector combination started in 1896 distributing films notably from Thomas Edison in Philadelphia. From 1897 he started making films and in 1902 formed the Lubin Manufacturing Company. This film is mostly composed of outdoors wide shots and includes at the beginning and at the end medium close-ups shot indoors.

While the film is presented as a remake of Personal, it includes a greater variety of shots and more importantly presents an unprecedented twist at the end with the shot revealing that the bride is played by a man, celebrated female impersonator Gilbert Sarony.
