= Romaine Fielding =

American actor

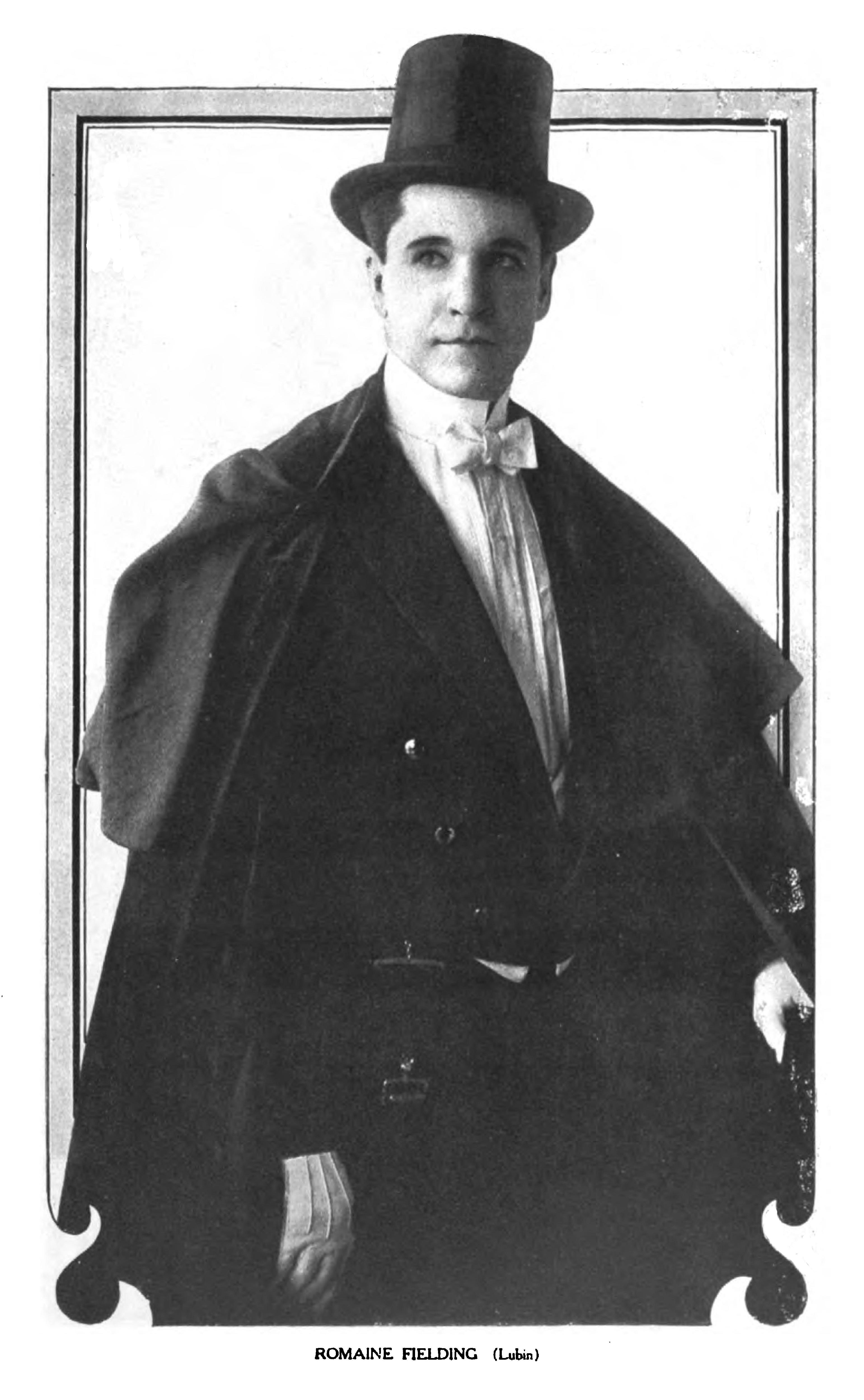
- Motion Picture Magazine (August, 1915) Vol. X No.7, New York
- Born: William Grant Blandin; May 22, 1867; Riceville, Iowa
- Died: December 16, 1927 (aged 60); Hollywood, California
- Other names: Royal A. Blandin
- Occupation: Actor
- Known for: Western films

Romaine Fielding (born William Grant Blandin; May 22, 1867 – December 15, 1927) was an American actor, screenwriter, and silent film director known for his dramatic westerns. He was also known as Royal A. Blandin.

== Early life and stage career ==
Fielding was born in Riceville, Iowa, the son of Chester John Blandin and Almeda Bacon. He was raised by his grandparents.

Although without medical training, at one time he ran a medical practice in Kansas City, Missouri. He prospected for gold in Alaska, where he made friends with Jack London and Rex Beach, both of whom would influence his work in films. He also worked as a travel agent, machinist and railway engineer before becoming an actor under the name of Romaine Fielding.

Prior to 1908, Fielding acted in stock theater with the Morosco company in San Francisco and the Castle Square company in Boston.

== Film career ==
Fielding worked for the Solax Film Company of New York before joining Philadelphia-based Lubin Studios in November 1911 at the age of 44. Despite his age, he could easily portray much younger characters.

In June 1912 Siegmund Lubin placed Fielding in charge of the Lubin Southwest Company as director, despite the fact that until then he had only acted. It was the start of a rapid rise to fame. Fielding would write and direct films as well as star in them. He broke with convention, challenging stereotypical casting of Indians and Mexicans as villains. His films often ended unexpectedly on a downbeat note. His work was praised in the trade press for its visual beauty combined with realism.

Fielding directed films in the old streets of Tucson in 1912, then moved north to Prescott to film stories based on old west mining and Indian life. He used many local people as extras. Towards the end of 1912 he moved his company down to Nogales. In March 1913 he crossed into Mexico with his company, and was able to film the Battle of Nogales as it happened. He later directed and filmed additional battle scenes, then spliced the real and artificial footage to give the sense of the battle having been filmed from both sides. From there he took his company to Silver City, New Mexico, where he rented two houses and built an outdoor stage for shooting interior scenes. He made use of abandoned structures to film spectacular fires or explosions, which formed the highlights of his fresh and realistic films, typically dark human tragedies.

Fielding rented the entire Plaza Hotel in Las Vegas, New Mexico from 1913 to 1915, and renamed it the Hotel Romaine. It is still possible to see traces of that name on the brick facade. The first film that Fielding made in Las Vegas was The Rattlesnake, a story about two rivals in love. Four more shorts were made within the next month. His five-reel thriller The Golden God employed about 5,000 local extras and featured a cavalry and artillery charge through the streets of the old town. The print for the film was lost in a fire, and there are no surviving copies. At one time he filmed a train smash at great expense. Lubin used the costly footage in five different films.

Fielding made a number of Mexican-themed western-style films and adventure films on location in California, Arizona, and New Mexico, but little of his work has survived. In July 1913 Motion Picture Story magazine announced that Fielding had come top of their readers poll with 1,311,018 votes. In 1915, Fielding built a moveable power plant to enable the Lubin company to make films at night. The four-ton unit included a generator, a 2,000-foot cable, a 13-inch searchlight, and other lights.

=== Military service and post-war career ===
Fielding's career was interrupted by his military service during World War I, when he served as a lieutenant colonel in the United States Army's Intelligence Department. Following the war, during the early 1920s, he organized the General Film Manufacturing Corporation in St. Louis, Missouri. Missouri's State Finance Department revoked the company's permit to sell stock in 1924, charging that the business had "degenerated into a mere stock-seling proposition." Fielding disputed the charge. Although the company had made some films, they achieved little success. Fielding returned to Hollywood following the filing of a petition of receivership and a suit by two employees for back wages.

== Personal life ==
After having married Icylene L. Richards in the 1890s, he married Mabel van Valkenburg in 1907 but divorced 10 years later. He worked and acted in live theatre for a number of years. His third marriage, in 1918, was to actress Joan Arliss (real name: Naomi Sachs), with whom he remained until his death; the union producing three children. Following the demise of Lubin Studios in 1917, Romaine Fielding was out of filmmaking until 1920 after which he continued to work in film until his death in Hollywood at age 60 from a blood clot. He is buried at Forest Lawn Memorial Park Cemetery in Glendale, California.

== Partial filmography ==
- The Uprising (1912 short)
- The Family Next Door (1912 short)
- The Way of the Mountains (1912 short)
- Chief White Eagle (1912 short)
- His Western Way (1912)
- The Blind Cattle King (1912)
- The Power of Silence (1912)
- His Blind Power (1913)
- Courageous Blood (1913)
- Who is the Savage? (1913)
- The Unknown (1913)
- In the Land of the Cactus (1913)
- Pedro's Treachery (1913)
- A Girl Spy in Mexico (1913)
- The Reformed Outlaw (1913)
- The Clod (1913)
- The Rattlesnake (1913)
- The Circle's End (1914)
- The Man from the West (1914)
- The Crimson Dove (1917)
- Moral Courage (1917)
- Youth (1917)
- The Man Worth While (1921)
- The Rich Slave (1921)
- Ten Modern Commandments (1927)
- Rose of the Golden West (1927)
- Gun Gospel (1927)
- The Noose (1928)
- The Shepherd of the Hills (1928)
