= Siegmund Lubin =

American motion picture pioneer (1851–1923)

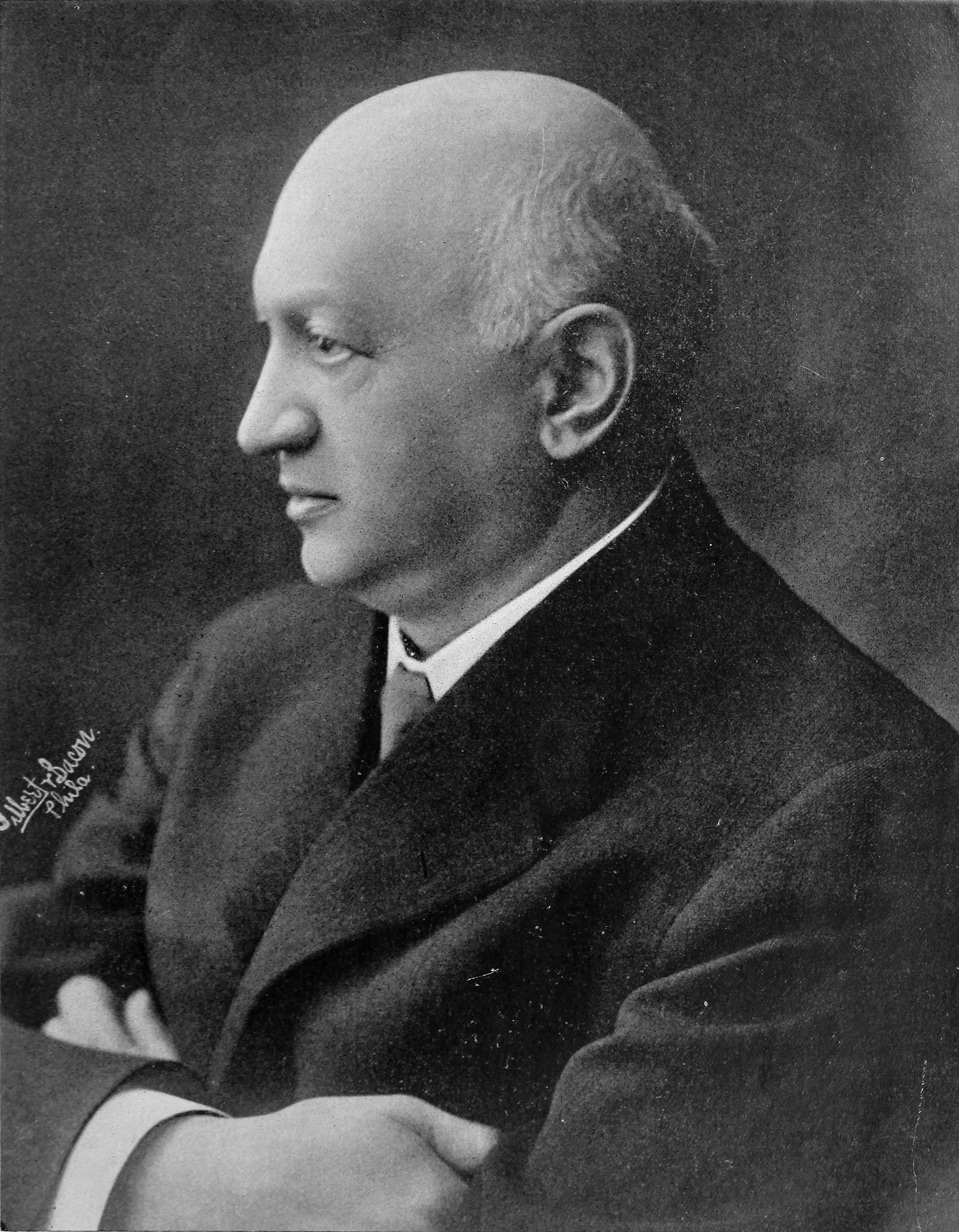
- Lubin in 1913
- Born: Zygmunt Lubszyński; April 20, 1851; Breslau or Poznań
- Died: September 11, 1923 (aged 72); Ventnor, New Jersey
- Other names: Siegmund Lubszynski "Pop" Lubin
- Occupations: Optometrist, inventor, film-maker, industrialist
- Spouse: Annie Abrams (m. 1882–1923)

Siegmund Lubin (born Zygmunt Lubszyński, April 20, 1851 – September 11, 1923) was an American motion picture pioneer who founded the Lubin Manufacturing Company (1902–1917) of Philadelphia.

== Biography ==
Siegmund Lubin was born as Zygmunt Lubszyński, a son of Samuel Lubszyński and Rebeka Lubszyńska, Polish Jews, in Breslau, Kingdom of Prussia (now Wrocław, Poland) or in Poznań, Kingdom of Prussia on April 20, 1851. His father, a successful ophthalmologist, moved the family for economic reasons to Berlin soon after Zygmunt's birth. There young Zygmunt Germanicized the spelling of his first name to Siegmund. He later graduated from the Heidelberg University and in 1876 emigrated to the United States, where he settled in Philadelphia and worked as an optometrist. Around 1881, he shortened his surname from the Polish Lubszyński to Lubin.

He soon progressed to making his own camera and projector combination, which he sold. In 1896 he began distributing films for Thomas Edison. In 1897 he started making films and in 1902 formed the Lubin Manufacturing Company, incorporating it in 1909. He made the film Meet Me at the Fountain in 1904. His company also sold illegally copied prints of many films by other directors, notably those of Georges Méliès, making Lubin one of the foremost early practitioners of film piracy.

By 1910 his company had built a film studio, "Lubinville", in Philadelphia, at Twentieth and Indiana Streets. A fire at its studio in June 1914 destroyed the negatives for his unreleased new films. When World War I broke out in Europe in September of that year, Lubin Studios was among the American filmmakers who lost foreign sales. In 1915, Lubin charmed Coronado when he secured a five-year lease, at $1.00 per year, from the Spreckels Beach Company with the intent of building a motion picture studio. After a dramatic opening in October 1915 and making about 20 films and documentaries in Coronado, the studio closed its doors one year later. The Lubin Film Company went out of business on September 1, 1917, after having made more than a thousand motion pictures. Siegmund went back to work as an optometrist.

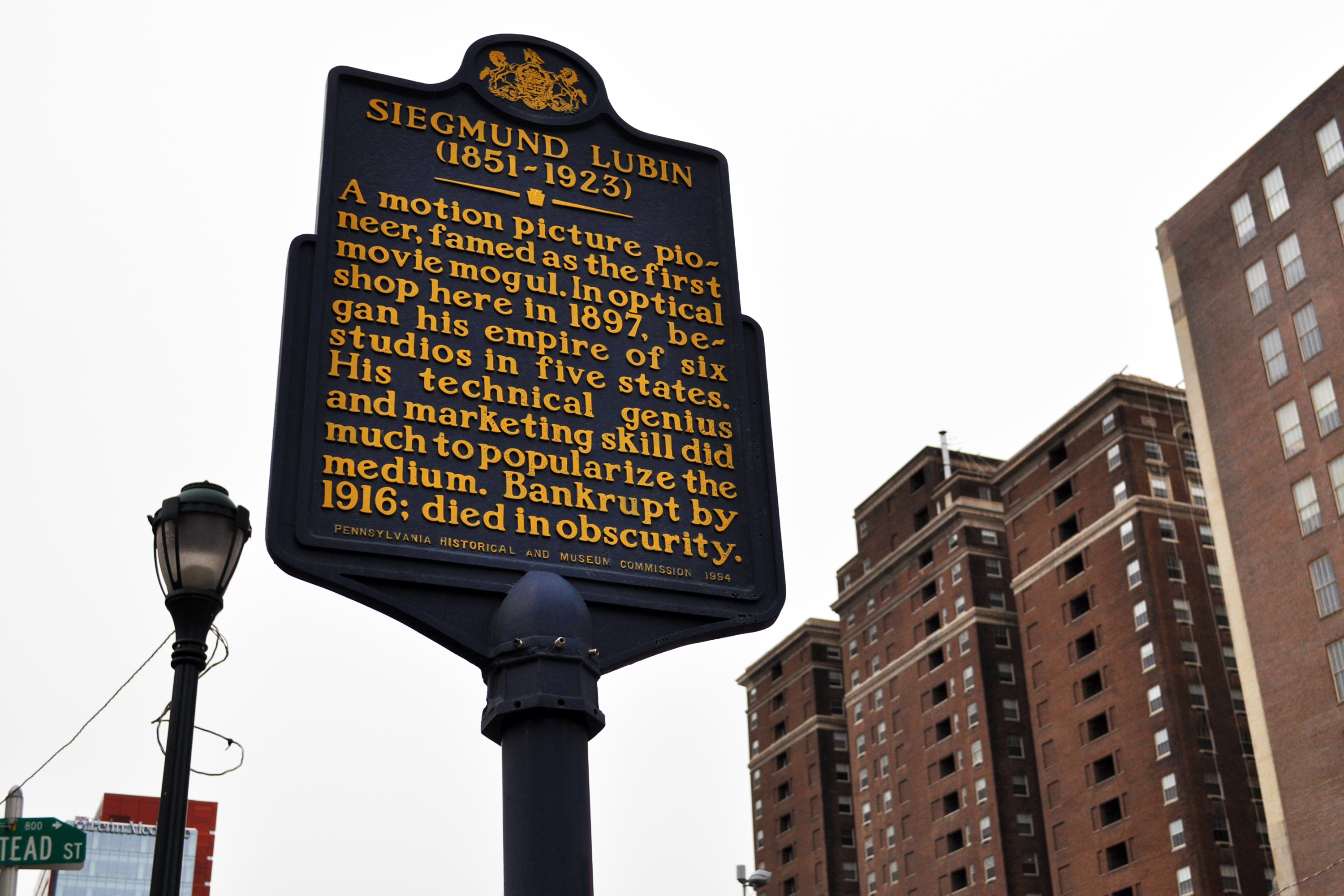
Siegmund Lubin Historical Marker at 21 S. 8th St. in Philadelphia

He died on September 11, 1923, at his home in Ventnor, New Jersey. He was buried on September 14, 1923.

== Filmography ==
- New Pillow Fight (1897)
- Cake Walk (1898)
- A Good Joke (1901)
- Chicken Thief (1903)
- Trick Donkey (1903)
- Dancing for a Chicken (1903)
- Meet Me at the Fountain (1904)
- The Yiddisher Boy (1909)
- The Sleeping Sentinel (1914)
- The Silent Signal (1914)
- The Tale of a Chicken (1914)
- Mandy's Chicken Dinner (1914)

== Legacy ==
For his contribution to the motion picture industry, Siegmund Lubin has a star on the Hollywood Walk of Fame (with his first name as "Sigmund") at 6166 Hollywood Blvd.
