= 1909 in film =

The year 1909 in film involved some significant events.

== Events ==
- Carl Laemmle founds the Independent Moving Pictures Company (IMP).
- Selig Polyscope Company establish the first permanent film studio in Los Angeles in Edendale, Los Angeles.
- The New York Motion Picture Company is founded and also open a film studio in Edendale. The studio is later used by Mack Sennett's Keystone Studios and then Mascot Pictures, which become part of Republic Pictures.
- February 4 – The Paris Film Congress begins, an attempt by leading European producers to form a cartel similar to that of the Motion Picture Patents Company in the United States.
- February 26 – Kinemacolor is shown to the public for the first time in the Palace Theatre in London.
- March 16 – Charles Urban forms the Natural Color Kinematograph Company.
- May 12 – Mr. Flip is released, the first film to feature someone being hit in the face with a pie.
- May 23 – The first news cinema, The Daily Bioscope, opens in London.
- June 17 – In the Sultan's Power, directed by Francis Boggs, is the first film ever completely made in Los Angeles, California.
- October 25 – IMP release their first film, Hiawatha, based on the 1855 poem The Song of Hiawatha by Henry Wadsworth Longfellow.
- November 5 - A Nature Movie by Arthur C. Pillsbury using film to explore the wonders of Yosemite. This first showing was for John Muir, a friend and associate of Pillsbury. Included was footage of the Hetch Hetchy. This film was then shown for the 1910 season at the Pillsbury Studio in Yosemite, advertised using postcards.
- December 2 – Matsunosuke Onoe, who will become the first superstar of Japanese cinema, appears in his first film, Goban Tadanobu.
- December 20 – James Joyce opens the Volta Cinematograph, the first cinema in Dublin.

== Notable films ==
Films produced in the United States unless stated otherwise

PLAY The Airship Destroyer; runtime 00:06:41.

=== A ===
- The Airship Destroyer, sci-fi trick film directed by Walter R. Booth – (UK)
- At the Altar, drama directed by D. W. Griffith for the Biograph Company

=== C ===
PLAY The Curtain Pole; runtime 00:08:00.

- A Corner in Wheat, drama directed by D. W. Griffith for the Biograph Company
- The Country Doctor, drama directed by D. W. Griffith for the Biograph Company, starring Mary Pickford
- The Cowboy Millionaire, western directed by Francis Boggs and Otis Turner, starring Tom Mix
- The Cricket on the Hearth, drama directed by D. W. Griffith for the Biograph Company, starring Owen Moore; based on the 1845 novella by Charles Dickens
- The Curtain Pole, comedy directed by D. W. Griffith for the Biograph Company, starring Mack Sennett and Florence Lawrence

=== D ===
- The Diabolic Tenant (Le Locataire diabolique), trick film directed by and starring Georges Méliès for Star Film – (France)
- A Drunkard's Reformation, drama directed by D. W. Griffith for the Biograph Company

=== E ===
- Edgar Allen Poe, drama directed by D. W. Griffith for the Biograph Company, starring Herbert Yost

=== G ===
- The Golden Louis, drama directed by D. W. Griffith for the Biograph Company

=== H ===
- The Hessian Renegades, war film directed by D. W. Griffith for the Biograph Company, starring Owen Moore

=== L ===
- Lady Helen's Escapade, comedy directed by D. W. Griffith for the Biograph Company, starring Florence Lawrence
- The Life of Moses, epic directed by J. Stuart Blackton for Vitagraph Studios
- The Lonely Villa, crime drama directed by D. W. Griffith for the Biograph Company, starring Florence Lawrence and Mary Pickford

=== M ===
PLAY A Midsummer Night's Dream; runtime 00:11:07.

- A Midsummer Night's Dream, comedy directed by Charles Kent and J. Stuart Blackton for Vitagraph Studios; based on the 16th-century play by William Shakespeare
- Moscow Clad in Snow (Moscou sous la neige), documentary directed by Joseph-Louis Mundwiller for Pathé-Frères – (France)
- Mr. Flip, comedy directed by Broncho Billy Anderson for Essanay Studios, starring Ben Turpin

=== N ===
- Nero, or the Fall of Rome (Nerone, o la caduta di Roma), historical epic directed by Luigi Maggi and Arturo Ambrosio for Ambrosio Film – (Italy)

=== O ===
- Oliver Twist, drama directed by J. Stuart Blackton for Vitagraph Studios; based on the 1838 novel by Charles Dickens

=== P ===
- Princess Nicotine; or, the Smoke Fairy, trick film directed by J. Stuart Blackton for Vitagraph Studios

=== R ===
PLAY Resurrection; runtime 00:12:11.

- The Red Man's View, western directed by D. W. Griffith for the Biograph Company, starring Owen Moore
- Resurrection, drama directed by D. W. Griffith for the Biograph Company, starring Florence Lawrence; based on the 1899 novel by Leo Tolstoy

=== S ===
- Slippery Jim (Pickpock ne craint pas les entraves), trick film directed by Segundo de Chomón for Pathe-Freres – (France)
- The Spider and the Butterfly (Le papillon fantastique) (incomplete), trick film directed by and starring Georges Méliès for Star Film – (France)

=== T ===
- Theodore Roosevelt in Africa, documentary directed by Cherry Kearton
- Those Awful Hats, comedy directed by D. W. Griffith for the Biograph Company, starring Mack Sennett
- A Trap for Santa Claus, drama directed by D. W. Griffith for the Biograph Company, starring Henry B. Walthall

=== V ===
- The Voice of the Violin, drama directed by D. W. Griffith for the Biograph Company

=== W ===
- Whimsical Illusions (Les Illusions fantaisistes), trick film directed by and starring Georges Méliès for Star Film – (France)

== Births ==
- January 1 – Dana Andrews, actor (died 1992)
- January 3 – Victor Borge, musician, actor (died 2000)
- January 8 - Willy Millowitsch, actor (died 1999)
- January 15 – Gene Krupa, musician, actor (died 1973)
- January 22 – Ann Sothern, actress (died 2001)
- January 24 – Ann Todd, actress (died 1993)
- January 29 – Alan Marshal, actor (died 1961)
- February 2 – Frank Albertson, actor (died 1964)
- February 6 – Aino Talvi, Estonian actress (d. 1992)
- February 9
  - Carmen Miranda, singer, actress (died 1955)
  - Heather Angel, actress (died 1986)
- February 11
  - Max Baer – boxer, actor (died 1959)
  - Joseph L. Mankiewicz – director, screenwriter, producer (died 1993)
- February 16
  - Hugh Beaumont, actor, director, writer (died 1982)
  - Jeffrey Lynn, actor (died 1995)
- March 19 – Louis Hayward, actor (died 1995)
- March 26 – Chips Rafferty, actor (died 1971)
- April 4 – Bobby Connelly, child actor (died 1922)
- April 22– Ralph Byrd, actor (died 1952)
- April 29 – Tom Ewell, actor (died 1994)
- May 4 – Howard Da Silva, actor, director (died 1986)
- May 15 – James Mason, actor (died 1984)
- May 16 – Margaret Sullavan, actress (died 1960)
- May 24 – Victoria Hopper, Canadian-born British actress and singer (died 2007)
- May 30 – Benny Goodman, musician, actor (died 1986)
- June 7 – Jessica Tandy, actress (died 1994)
- June 8 – Robert Carson, actor (died 1979)
- June 14 – Burl Ives, actor (died 1995)
- June 20 – Errol Flynn, actor (died 1959)
- June 26- Wolfgang Reitherman, director, producer, animator (died 1985)
- July 1 – Madge Evans, actress (died 1981)
- July 11
  - Irene Hervey, actress (died 1998)
  - John 'Dusty' King, actor, singer (died 1987)
- July 12 – Curly Joe DeRita, actor (died 1993)
- July 23 – Helen Martin, American actress (died 2000)
- July 24 - Sydney Bromley, English character actor (died 1987)
- August 25
  - Ruby Keeler, singer, actress (died 1993)
  - Michael Rennie, actor (died 1971)
- August 26 – Jim Davis, American actor (died 1981)
- September 7 – Elia Kazan, director (died 2003)
- September 27 - Amerigo Tot, Hungarian actor (died 1984)
- October 6 – Everett Sloane, actor (suicide 1965)
- October 6 – Robert Carson, screenwriter (died 1983)
- October 20 – Carla Laemmle, actress (died 2014)
- October 29 – Douglass Montgomery, actor (died 1966)
- November 11 – Robert Ryan, actor (died 1973)
- November 26 – Frances Dee, actress (died 2004)
- December 9 – Douglas Fairbanks Jr., actor (died 2000)
- December 12 – Karen Morley, actress (died 2003)
- December 20 – Diane Ellis, actress (died 1930)
- December 22 - Patricia Hayes, English character actress (died 1998)

== Deaths ==
- January 27 – Benoît-Constant Coquelin, actor, Cyrano de Bergerac (born 1841)
- September 4 – Clyde Fitch, author & playwright whose works have been adapted into films. (born 1865)

== Film debuts ==
- Fatty Arbuckle – Ben's Kid (as Roscoe Arbuckle)
- Ethel Clayton – Justified (short)
- Dolores Costello (as a child) – A Midsummer Night's Dream
- Helene Costello (as a child) – Les Misérables (Part I) (short)
- Marie Dressler – Marie Dressler (short)
- Francis Ford – The Stolen Wireless
- Annette Kellerman – The Bride of Lammermoor: A Tragedy of Bonnie Scotland
- James Kirkwood – The Heart of an Outlaw (short)
- Florence La Badie – The Politician's Love Story
- Tom Mix – The Cowboy Millionaire
- Mary Pickford – Mrs. Jones Entertains
- Billy Quirk – The Heart of an Outlaw
- William A. Russell – Tag Day (short)
- William Stowell – The Cowboy Millionaire
- Blanche Sweet – A Man with Three Wives
- Rose Tapley – The Way of the Cross (short)
- Clara Kimball Young – Washington Under the American Flag (short)
