= Bottom of the well =

(The) bottom of the well is an idiomatic phrase, referring to a position from which one has a limited perspective or opportunities.

It may also refer to:

- Bottom of the Well (song), a song by the Australian band Airbourne
- Looking at the World from the Bottom of a Well, a single by the US singer Mike Doughty
- The Thing at the Bottom of the Well, a short story by US author Stephen King
- Song from the Bottom of a Well, a song by English singer Kevin Ayers
- The Bottom of the Well, a 1917 silent film in which Adele DeGarde acted
- Bottom of the Well, a level in the computer game The Legend of Zelda: Ocarina of Time
- Man in the bottom of the Well, a song by the Bill Kirchen

See also:

- 井底之蛙
