= The Country Doctor (1909 film) =

1909 film directed by D. W. Griffith

- Screenshot of the Harcourt family in the countryside
- Directed by: D. W. Griffith
- Written by: D. W. Griffith
- Starring: Kate Bruce
- Cinematography: G. W. Bitzer
- Production company: Biograph Company
- Distributed by: Biograph Company
- Release date: July 8, 1909
- Running time: Original length 942 feet (15 minutes)
- Country: United States
- Language: Silent (English intertitles)

Play film; runtime 00:15:31

The Country Doctor is a 1909 American short silent drama film written and directed by D. W. Griffith. Currently in the public domain, prints of The Country Doctor are preserved in the film archives of the Museum of Modern Art and the Library of Congress.

== Plot ==
The opening pan shows the Harcourts—well-to-do Doctor Harcourt, his wife and their young daughter Edith—going for a leisurely walk in the countryside.

Later, the doctor examines his sick child. He is greatly troubled by her condition, so troubled that when a poor woman runs to his home to inform him that her daughter is desperately ill, he at first remains where he is. Then he goes to the other girl. Mrs. Harcourt becomes so concerned about her daughter, she sends her maid to fetch her husband. He says he will come soon. When Edith becomes worse, Mrs. Harcourt sends her maid a second time. Dr. Harcourt starts to leave, but the other child's mother grabs his arm, putting him in a terrible position. He chooses to stay with his patient. The girl is saved, but the doctor returns home too late to save his own child. The camera then pans slowly from the house to the countryside.

== Cast ==
- Kate Bruce as Poor Mother (uncredited)
- Adele DeGarde as Poor Mother's Sick Daughter (uncredited)
- Gladys Egan as Edith Harcourt – Daughter (uncredited)
- Rose King as Maid (uncredited)
- Florence Lawrence as Mrs. Harcourt (uncredited)
- Mary Pickford as Poor Mother's Elder Daughter (uncredited)
- Frank Powell as Doctor Harcourt (uncredited)

== Analysis ==
In A Hidden History of Film Style, Christopher Beach states that The Country Doctor "is almost universally cited as one of Griffith's most visually innovative early efforts ... The film is most famous for introducing the highly unusual stylistic device of two symmetrically placed pans, one at the beginning of the reel and the other at the end", the first from left to right, the second in the opposite direction.

Mike Adams, writing in Lee de Forest: Kong of Radio, Television, and Film, comments that "Griffith introduces a parallel cutting between the wealthy doctor's family and the poor family, with similarly ill children shown in their beds surrounded by the worried mother. ... you can see how Griffith is developing a language of film cutting for story telling, cutting between the two houses, comparing and contrasting two locations."

== See also ==
- List of American films of 1909
- 1909 in film
- Treasures from American Film Archives
