= Pride of the Range =

1910 film

- Directed by: Francis Boggs
- Starring: Tom Mix
- Release date: 1910
- Country: United States
- Languages: Silent; English intertitles

Pride of the Range is a 1910 American short silent Western film directed by Francis Boggs. It features Hoot Gibson in his first on-screen role.

== Cast ==
- Tom Mix
- Art Acord
- Milton Brown
- Hoot Gibson
- Al Green
- Betty Harte
- Tom Santschi

== See also ==
- List of American films of 1910
- Hoot Gibson filmography
- Tom Mix filmography
