= List of American films of 1909 =

More than 1,080 American films were released in 1909, including at least two of feature-length.

Title	Director	Cast	Genre	Notes
A B C's of the U.S.A.				
Adventures of a Drummer Boy				
And a Little Child Shall Lead Them	D. W. Griffith	Marion Leonard, Arthur V. Johnson		
At the Altar	D. W. Griffith	Marion Leonard	Drama	
Boots and Saddles				
The Brahma Diamond	D. W. Griffith	Harry Solter, Florence Lawrence		
A Brave Irish Lass				
A Burglar's Mistake	D. W. Griffith	Harry Solter, Charles Inslee		
C.Q.D.; or, Saved by Wireless; a True Story of the Wreck of the Republic				
The Castaways				
Cohen at Coney Island				
Cohen's Dream				
A Colonial Romance				
The Cord of Life	D. W. Griffith	Charles Inslee, Marion Leonard		
The Cracker's Bride				
The Criminal Hypnotist	D. W. Griffith	Owen Moore, Marion Leonard		
Cure for Bashfulness				-
The Curtain Pole	D. W. Griffith	Mack Sennett	Comedy	
A Daughter of the Sun				
Davy Crockett – In Hearts United	Fred J. Balshofer	Charles K. French	Drama	
The Deacon's Love Letters				
The Deception				
A Drunkard's Reformation	D. W. Griffith	Arthur V. Johnson	Drama	
Edgar Allen Poe	D. W. Griffith	Barry O'Moore, Linda Arvidson		
The Energetic Street Cleaner				
The Fascinating Mrs. Francis	D. W. Griffith			
A Fool's Revenge	D.W. Griffith	Owen Moore		
A Friend in the Enemy's Camp				
The Girl Spy: An Incident of the Civil War	Sidney Olcott	Gene Gauntier	Drama	first in The Girl Spy series
The Girls and Daddy	D. W. Griffith	Florence Lawrence		
The Golden Louis	D. W. Griffith		Drama	
The Haunted Lounge				
The Hindoo Dagger	D. W. Griffith	Harry Solter		
His Ward's Love	D. W. Griffith	Arthur V. Johnson		
His Wife's Mother	D. W. Griffith	John R. Cumpson		
The Honor of the Slums				
The Honor of Thieves	D. W. Griffith	Harry Solter		
I Did It	D.W. Griffith	Adele DeGarde	Drama	
Jessie, the Stolen Child				
Jones and His New Neighbors	D.W. Griffith	John R. Cumpson	Comedy	
The Joneses Have Amateur Theatricals	D. W. Griffith	John R. Cumpson	Comedy	
Kenilworth				
King Lear	J. Stuart Blackton and William V. Ranous	William V. Ranous		
The Life of Moses	J. Stuart Blackton	Pat Hartigan, Julia Arthur, William J. Humphrey	Biblical	Vitagraph
The Life of Napoleon				
Love Finds a Way	D. W. Griffith	Anita Hendrie		
The Love of the Pasha's Son: A Turkish Romance				
The Lure of the Gown	D. W. Griffith	Marion Leonard		
The Mad Miner				
The Maniac Cook				
The Medicine Bottle				
Midnight Disturbance				
Les Misérables	J. Stuart Blackton	Maurice Costello, William V. Ranous	Drama	
Mr. Jones Has a Card Party				
Mrs. Jones Entertains				
The Moonstone			Drama	lost
Napoleon and the Empress Josephine				
The Old Soldier's Story				
One Touch of Nature			Short, Drama	
The Politician's Love Story				
The Poor Musician				
The Prussian Spy				
The Road Agents				
The Road to the Heart				
A Rural Elopement				
The Sacrifice				
The Salvation Army Lass				
A Sister's Love: A Tale of the Franco-Prussian War				
A Sister's Love				
Tag Day				
A Tale of the West				
The Tenderfoot				
Those Awful Hats	D. W. Griffith	Mack Sennett	Comedy	
Those Boys!				
Tragic Love				
Trying to Get Arrested				
The Voice of the Violin				
The Welcome Burglar				
Where Is My Wandering Boy Tonight?				
The Wooden Leg	D. W. Griffith	David Miles	Comedy	
A Wreath in Time				

== See also ==
- 1909 in the United States
