= Mr. Flip =

1909 comedy film

- Mr. Flip about to receive the first known 'Pie in the Face' in film.
- Directed by: Gilbert M. 'Broncho Billy' Anderson
- Starring: Ben Turpin
- Production company: Essanay Studios
- Release date: May 12, 1909
- Running time: 4 minutes
- Country: United States
- Language: Silent with English intertitles

Mr. Flip is a 1909 American silent comedy film made by Essanay Studios, directed by Gilbert M. 'Broncho Billy' Anderson and starring Ben Turpin. The film is about a man going to various locations in town where he flirts with the women, and they in turn get comedic revenge on him, causing him to leave their establishment, and leave them alone. This film is believed to have included the first cinematic instance of a comedian being hit in the face with a pie, later known as the Pie in the Face, when Ben Turpin was struck. However, the pie Turpin was hit with was hand-held, not thrown.

== Plot ==
The film begins with Mr. Flip, played by Ben Turpin, in a general store, in which he flirts with the woman behind the counter, for which he is carried out of the building on a hand truck. He travels to a manicurist where he eventually gets the pointed end of a pair of scissors, sticking up out of his chair, when he sits down. He then meets a telephone operator at her desk, he calls her on a nearby phone, and she gets revenge by shocking him with electricity, through the phone, by turning her manual generator. Next at a barber shop two women workers, get even with him by pasting his face with shaving cream and tossing him out of the building. At a bar he flirts with the bar attendants, until he gets sprayed with seltzer, by them and another patron. As the film's climax he enters a bakery and gets a pie in the face by the assistant.

== Cast ==
• Ben Turpin as Mr. Flip

== See also ==
- List of American films of 1909
- 1909 in film
