= A Life for a Life =

A Life for a Life may refer to:

- A Life for a Life (1916 film)
- A Life for a Life (1910 film)
