= Rose King =

American actress (1891-1959)

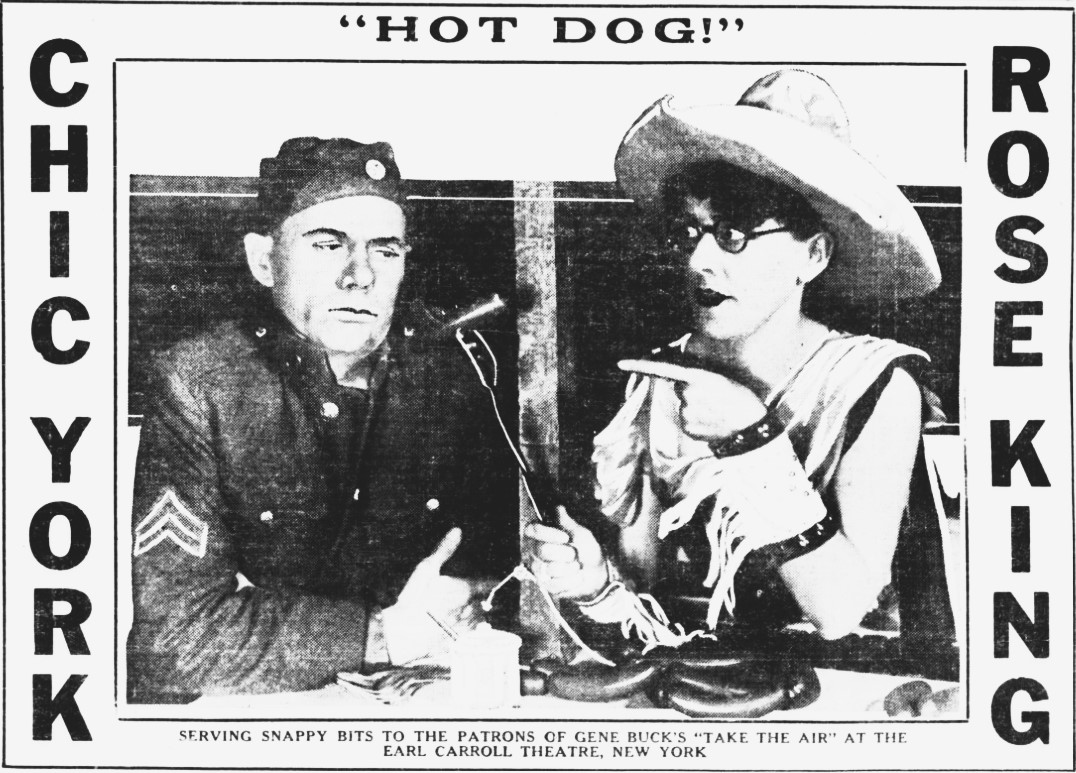
Chic York and Rose King in 1928

Rose King (born Rose Koenig, in St Louis, MO, 1891-1958, was an American film actress and a Broadway lead.

In her long career on Broadway, stretching from at least 1919 to 1942, she starred in High Kickers, Thumbs Up!, The Torch Bearers, and A la Carte, among other productions. As an actor, she had an occasional Hollywood fling. For example, she made five silent films in 1909, including The Necklace and The Seventh Day both co-starring Mary Pickford (and both directed by D.W. Griffith).

== Reviews ==
Eau Claire Leader, 21 Sept 1909:

The new vaudeville talent for this first part of the week is the firm of Teed and Lazelle, German comedianes of a very high class. They gave entire satisfaction and were loudly applauded. The greatest interest, however, centered on a magnificent film, "The Seventh Day," the heroine being Miss Rose King of this city, whose last appearance here was as leading lady with Corbett, the famous pugilist, in "The Burglar and the Lady" at the Grand Opera House. Miss King represents Mrs. Herne in the play now on. She appears to great advantage, being a lady of great personal charms, her body being as graceful as the body of a panther.

Eau Claire Leader, 24 Sept 1909:

The Unique [Theater] has enjoyed large audiences this week, due largely to two first class attractions, viz, Teed and Lazelle, German comedians, and Miss Rose King in the beautiful motion picture drama, "In the Seventh Day." The latter has created a decided sensation, the heroine being one of our own people.

There was a time when it was the popular thing to denounce the moving picture show, but today, with the extraordinary development of motion pictures it has become a real fashion. There is no amusement that attracts the people to such an extent as the moving picture show. It appeals directly to the imagination because of the many times real worth represents itself to a great number of wage earners and their families. More than fifty per cent of the entire theater going people are found in the moving picture shows. It attracts thousands who never go to the dramatic theater and affords opportunities for education.

Miss King made her last appearance Wednesday night and left for Winnipeg Thursday morning by the Wells Fargo Express, neatly done up in a wooden box 6x9x24 inches.

== York and King ==
Most of Rose King's theatrical career was in partnership with B. M. "Chick" York. Their most famous and durable vaudeville act was "The Old Family Tintype". The team dated its inception at 1907 (in a 1937 radio interview they were "celebrating 30 years in show business"), although their relationship dated from early childhood. Billboard Magazine published an old photo of York and King posing together, at the ages of five and three, respectively.

York and King created many amusing vaudeville routines, and developed an international following. They headlined many vaudeville bills in the United States and England.

In 1935 they starred in two short-subject comedy films produced by Educational Pictures in New York: Domestic Bliss-ters and How Am I Doing, the latter featuring their famous vaudeville sketch "The Sleigh Ride". King appeared solo in a character role in Educational's 1938 comedy Love and Onions.

== Selected filmography ==
- The Country Doctor - as a maid
- The Necklace (1909)
- Domestic Bliss-ters (1935, short subject with Chick York)
- How Am I Doing (1935, short subject with Chick York)

== Quotation ==
"You can fool all of the people some of the time, and some of the people all of the time, and that's sufficient." - Rose King
