= Betty Harte =

American actress (1882–1965)

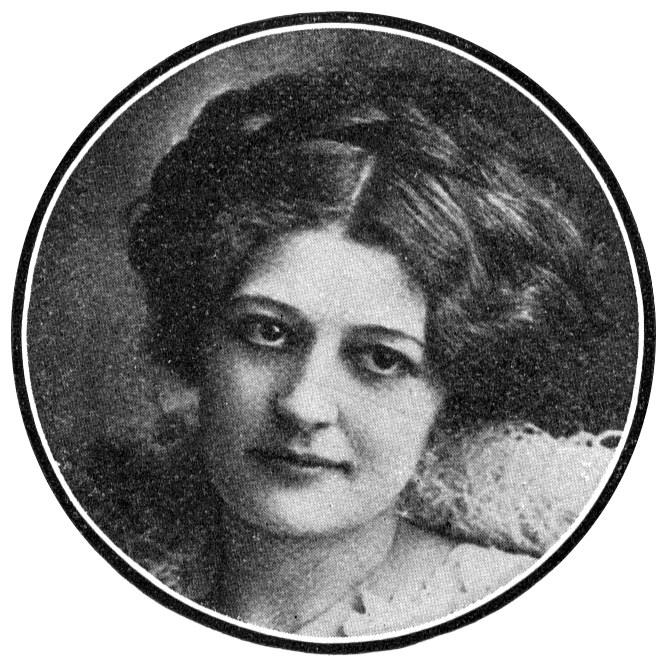
- Betty Harte in 1911
- Born: Daisey Mae Light; May 13, 1882; Lebanon, Pennsylvania, U.S.
- Died: January 3, 1965 (aged 82); Sunland, California, U.S.
- Occupation: Actress
- Years active: 1908–1916

Betty Harte (1882–1965) was a leading lady during the heyday of the silent film era, starring in nine feature films and 108 short films. She is credited with writing four screenplays. She chose Betty Harte as her professional name in honor of her favorite author, Bret Harte.

== Acting career ==
Harte appeared on stage with various stock entertainment companies in the eastern United States. While working as a secretary for a newspaper in Los Angeles, California, she was assigned to interview Selig Polyscope Company director Francis Boggs, who liked her appearance and demeanor and quickly signed her to an acting contract. She became the first leading lady of the Selig Polyscope Company's Los Angeles division and appeared in period dramas, swashbucklers, and Westerns.

She starred opposite the company's flamboyant leading man, Hobart Bosworth, in the films: Dr. Jekyll and Mr. Hyde (1908), In the Sultan's Power (1909), The Roman (1910) and Across the Plain's (1910). She later excelled at playing Western heroines and co-starred with Thomas Santschi in Pride of the Range (1910) and Through Fire and Smoke (1911). She also co-starred with the famous Western actor and fellow Pennsylvanian Tom Mix in Pride of the Range (1910) and A Romance of the Rio Grande (1911).

Harte was known for doing her own stunts. While filming an underwater scene in Bermuda for Victory Pictures in the film The Mystery of the Poison Pool (1914) she was bitten by an angel fish and narrowly escaped a serious injury. She also appeared in The Viking, filmed by Victory Pictures in Bermuda back-to-back with The Mystery of the Poison Pool.

Two notable films she appeared in were In the Sultan's Power (1909) and The Coming of Columbus (1912). The short film In the Sultan's Power was the first film shot entirely on location in California. She co-starred with Marshall Stedman in the feature film The Coming of Columbus, a three-reel melodrama that was completely hand-tinted in Paris, France, and was an early all-color feature film.

== Personal life ==
Harte was born Daisey Mae Light in Lebanon, Pennsylvania, on May 13, 1882, to Theophilus Ozias Light and Agnes Mary Bohn. She had seven siblings, although only three lived to adulthood. By 1900, she was living in Philadelphia, where she was attending private school. She was the cousin of the American stage actress Margaret Illington. On October 17, 1907, she married Frank Hardy in Pasadena, California; sometime before 1917 they divorced. On September 12, 1917, she married Ralph Lewis Kruger. The 1920 census record states Ralph and Betty were living in Los Angeles, California. Ralph either worked for or owned a motion picture theater, and Betty had no occupation listed, as she had retired from her film career four years earlier in 1916.

Throughout her life, she was a bird collector, studied ornithology and was a student of botany, especially favoring flowers. While under contract with the Selig Polyscope Company, she maintained a large bird enclosure on the grounds of their studio in Edendale, California, where she kept various species including mockingbirds and nightingales.

Harte said of her doctrine of success, "The more you travel, the more you see, the more you learn, the better your chance of interpreting even the smallest role correctly." She described herself as "Hollywood's First Movie Queen."

She died on January 3, 1965, in Sunland, California, and is buried in Glen Haven Memorial Park in Sylmar, California.

== Filmography ==
Work	Format	Year	Role
The Heritage of Hate	Feature	1916	Myra (as Betty Hart)
The Man from Bitter Roots	Feature	1916	Undetermined
The Bait	Feature	1916	Margot
The Buzzard's Shadow	Feature	1915	Mrs. Sears (as Betty Hart)
Nancy of Stony Isle	short	1915	Nancy
The Mystery of the Poison Pool	Feature	1914	Dorothy
The Oath of a Viking	short	1914	Lydia - the King's Daughter
The Next in Command	Feature	1914	Zuleika (as Bettie Hart)
A Woman's Triumph	Feature	1914	Effie Deans
The Pride of Jennico	Feature	1914	The Gypsy Maid, Michel
A Nest Unfeathered	short	1914	The Foreman's Wife
Hoodman Blind	Feature	1913	Jess / Nance
The Ironmaster	short	1913	Betty
I Was Meant for You	short	1913	Susan
Bill's Sweetheart	short	1913	Little Maverick (as an adult)
An Indian Nemesis	short	1913	Hope (Col. West's daughter) (as Betty Hart)
Where Shore and Water Meet	short	1913	Mabel Newman - The Designer
Side Tracked by Sister	short	1913	Mother
The Noisy Six	short	1913	Unconfirmed
The Good in the Worst of Us	short	1913	Sergeant Williams' Wife
An Innocent Informer	short	1913	The Moonshiner's Daughter
Master and Man	short	1913	Ethel Pierce - Seymour's Fiancée (as Bettie Harte)
A Pair of Boots	short	1912	Unconfirmed
The Girl of the Mountains	short	1912	Tess Sutton - the Old Miner's Daughter
The Vintage of Fate	short	1912	Maria
Kings of the Forest	short	1912	Sona - Fritz's Wife
Her Educator	short	1912	The Kid
His Wedding Eve	short	1912	The Nurse
The Fisherboy's Faith	short	1912	Amanda's City Friend
Getting Atmosphere	short	1912	The Ingénue
How the Cause Was Won	short	1912	Mabel Moody
An Assisted Elopement	short	1912	Jeanette Wilson
The Pirate's Daughter	short	1912	Almita - the Pirate's Daughter
The Substitute Model	short	1912	Mary Carr - the Little Sister
The Man from Dragon Land	short	1912	Samantha - the Widow's Servant
The Polo Substitute	short	1912	Margaret Bush
The Girl and the Cowboy	short	1912	Nell Carter - The Belle of Three Pines
The Vow of Ysobel	short	1912	Ysobel
The Vision Beautiful	short	1912	The Serf
A Reconstructed Rebel	short	1912	Louise Yancey (as an adult)
Brains and Brawn	short	1912	Molly Jones
Me an' Bill	short	1912	Young Kitty
The Junior Officer	short	1912	Ethel's Maid
The 'Epidemic' in Paradise Gulch	short	1912	Miss Williams - the Schoolteacher
The Girl of the Lighthouse	short	1912	Jenna Jensen - the Lighthouse Keeper's Daughter
Bounder	short	1912	Ruby Blackwell
The Ace of Spades	short	1912	The Woman
The Shrinking Rawhide	short	1912	Mercedes
The Danites	short	1912	Nancy Williams
Disillusioned	short	1912	Marjorie Spofford
The Little Stowaway	short	1912	Dot - The Little Stowaway
Diplomat Interrupted	short	1912	Jessie Scott
The Secret Wedding	short	1912	Bessie Whalen
The Mate of the Alden Bessie	short	1912	Undetermined Secondary Role (unconfirmed)
A Modern Rip	short	1912	Rip's Daughter
The Little Widow	short	1911	Unconfirmed
George Warrington's Escape	short	1911	Fanny Mountain
A Romance of the Rio Grande	short	1911	Unconfirmed
The Maid at the Helm	short	1911	Elizabeth Barker
A Frontier Girl's Courage	short	1911	Mary Wilson
An Evil Power	short	1911	Alice Morgan
Blackbeard	short	1911	Senorita Lopez
The Bootlegger	short	1911	Mattie Fancher
In the Days of Gold	short	1911	Juanita Lopez
Old Billy	short	1911	Mrs. Dane
The Coquette	short	1911	Mabel - the Coquette
Captain Brand's Wife	short	1911	Ada Jackson - Captain Brand's Wife
Making a Man of Him	short	1911	Sallie Morgan - Bertie's Wife
Out-Generaled	short	1911	Bessie Darrow
The Artist's Sons	short	1911	Model No. 1
Shipwrecked	short	1911	Annie Jackson
A Cup of Cold Water	short	1911	The Padre's Ward
The Heart of John Barlow	short	1911	Lucy Barlow
How Algy Captured a Wild Man	short	1911	Maud Lorimer
Through Fire and Smoke	short	1911	Betty St. Clair - the Factory Girl
The Blacksmith's Love	short	1911	Undetermined Secondary Role (unconfirmed, uncredited)
The Regeneration of Apache Kid	short	1911	Mary Worthington - the Colonel's Daughter
Their Only Son	short	1911	Unconfirmed
Slick's Romance	short	1911	Unconfirmed
The Knight Errant	short	1911	Yvette
The Profligate	short	1911	Mercedes - Pauline's Sister
It Happened in the West	short	1911	Unconfirmed
The White Medicine Man	short	1911	Mlle. Julie
The New Faith	short	1911	The Slave Girl
A Sacrifice to Civilization	short	1911	Unconfirmed
Told in the Sierras	short	1911	Sallie Winton - Jake's Wife
Range Pals	short	1911	Danny
Where There's a Will, There's a Way	short	1911	Miss Hay
The Herders	short	1911	Wana
The Still Alarm	short	1911	Cad Wilber
The Haven of Refuge	short	1911	Unconfirmed
The Spy	short	1911	Unconfirmed
Pride of the Range	short	1910	Unconfirmed
Justinian and Theodora	short	1910	Theodora
A Tale of the Sea	short	1910	Bill's Sweetheart / Tom's Wife
The Schoolmaster of Mariposa	short	1910	Miss Williams
In the Great Northwest	short	1910	Julie - the Factor's Daughter
Davy Crockett	short	1910	Unconfirmed
The Common Enemy	short	1910	Unconfirmed
Across the Plains	short	1910	Unconfirmed
The Roman	short	1910	Unconfirmed
The Courtship of Miles Standish	short	1910	Unconfirmed
The Christian Martyrs	short	1909	Unconfirmed
Pine Ridge Feud	short	1909	Unconfirmed
On the Little Big Horn or Custer's Last Stand	short	1909	Unconfirmed
On the Border	short	1909	Unconfirmed
Up San Juan Hill	short	1909	Unconfirmed
The Stampede	short	1909	Mabel - The Ranch Owner's Daughter
The Leopard Queen	short	1909	Jessie Ownes - the Captain's Daughter
In the Sultan's Power	short	1909	Unconfirmed
In the Badlands	short	1909	Isabel Walton - the Colonel's Daughter
Boots and Saddles	short	1909	Unconfirmed
The Tenderfoot	short	1909	Unconfirmed
The Spirit of '76	short	1908	Unconfirmed
Damon and Pythias	short	1908	Unconfirmed
Rip Van Winkle	short	1908	Unconfirmed
Dr. Jekyll and Mr. Hyde	short	1908	Unconfirmed

== Screenplays ==
- The Bridge of Sighs (1915) – scenario
- The Little Stowaway (1912) – short, scenario
- Their Only Son (1911) – short
- The Spy (1911) – short

A scenario is a sketch or outline of a story, which gives the reader an idea of events without including all the details.

== Picture gallery ==
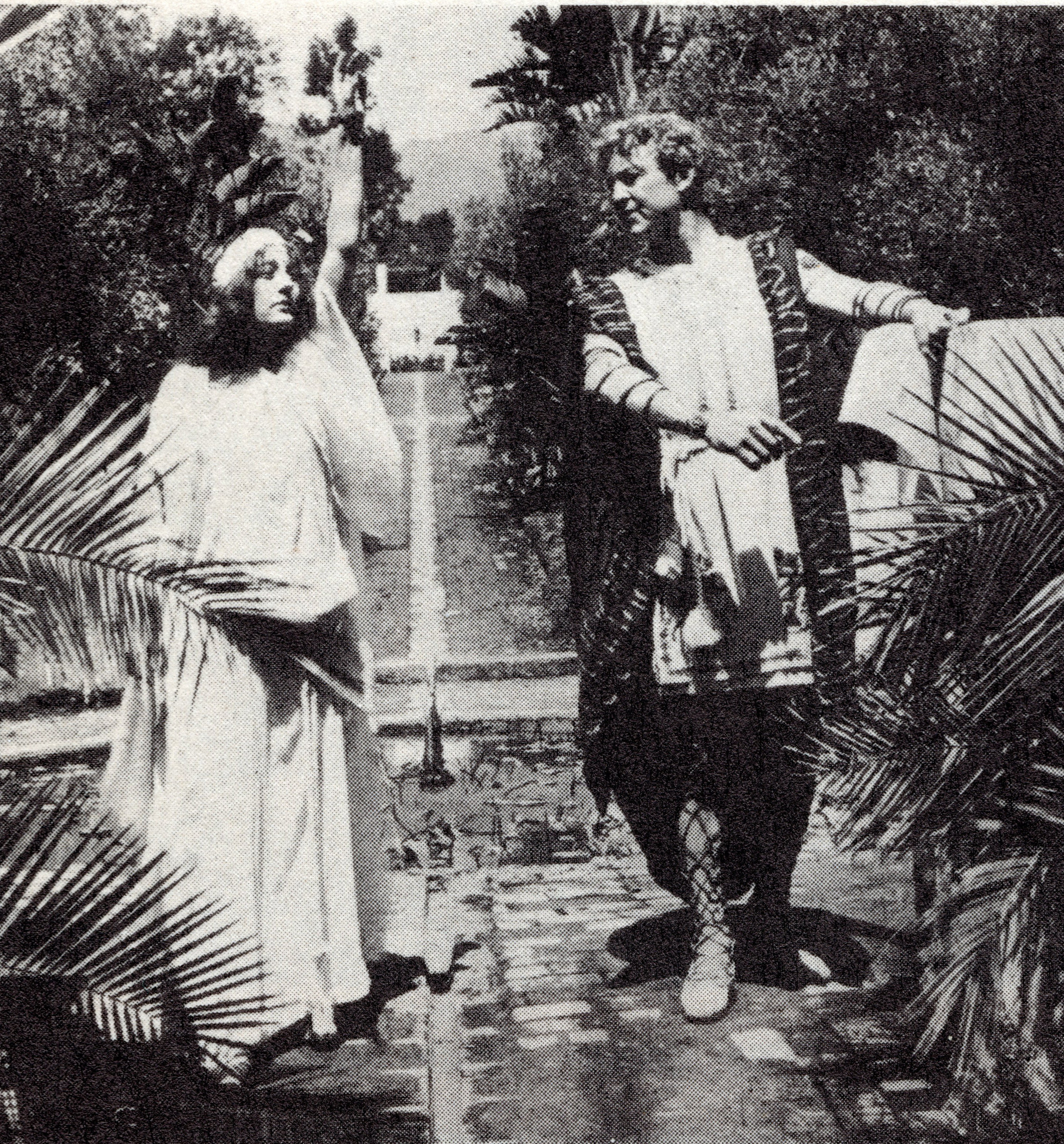
Betty Harte and Hobart Bosworth in The Roman (1910)

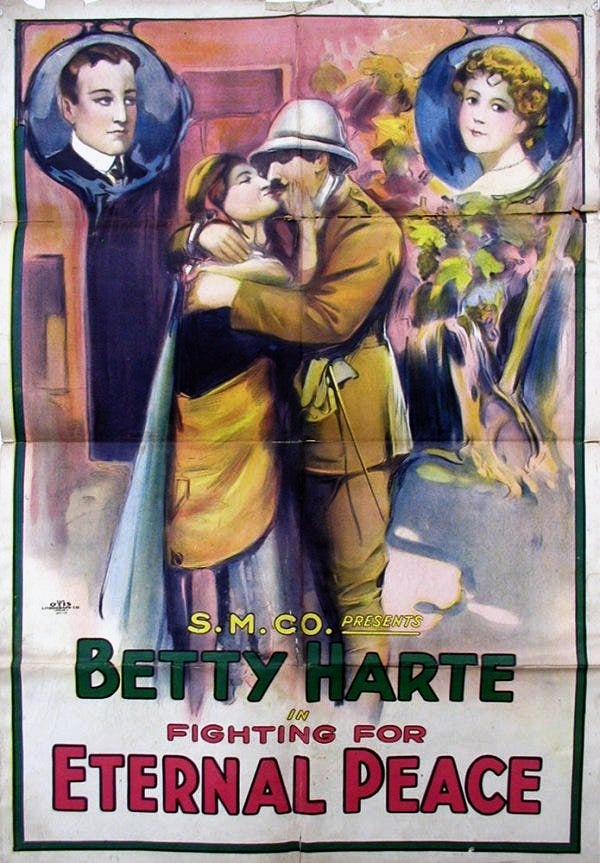
Betty Harte starring in Fighting for Eternal Peace - Movie Poster (1918)

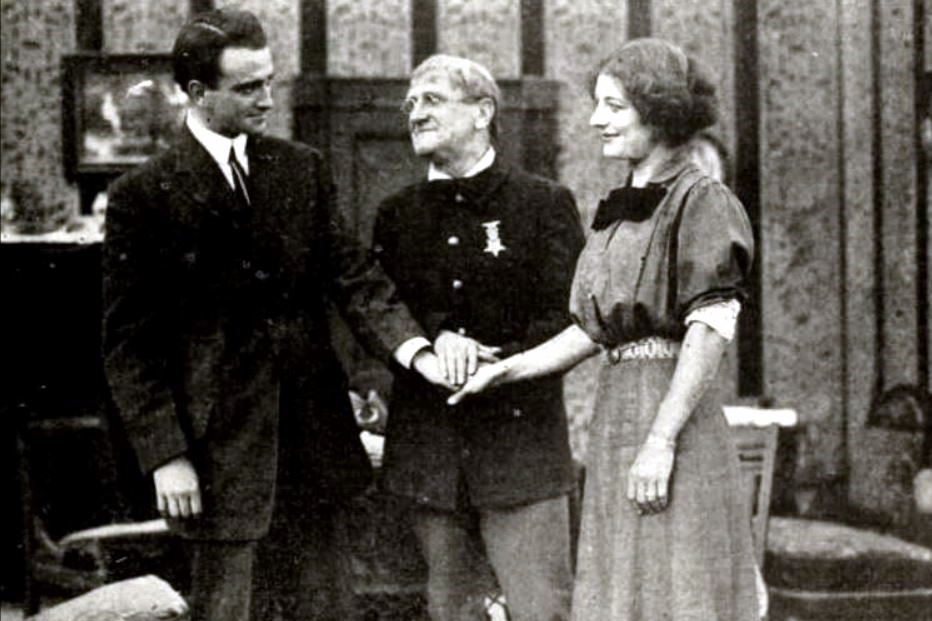
Betty Harte and Wheeler Oakman in How the Cause Was Won (1912)

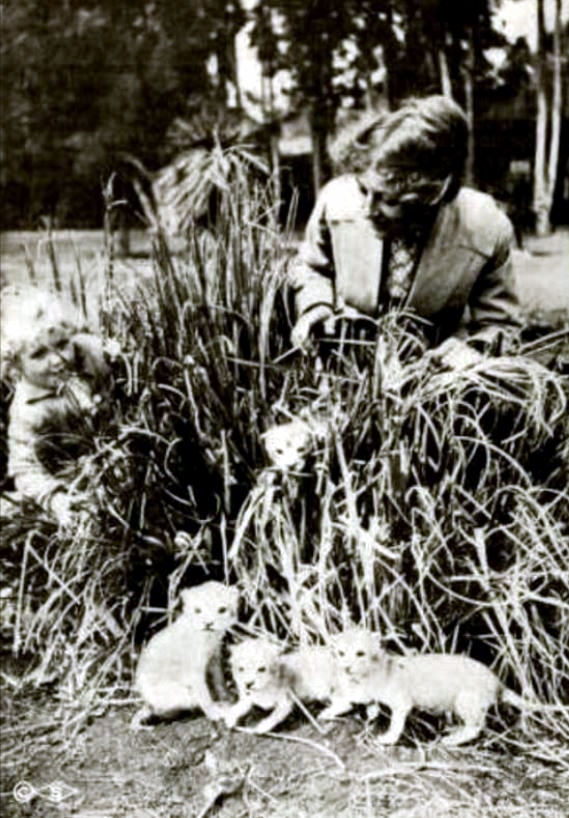
Betty Harte and Baby Lillian Wade - ca. 1914

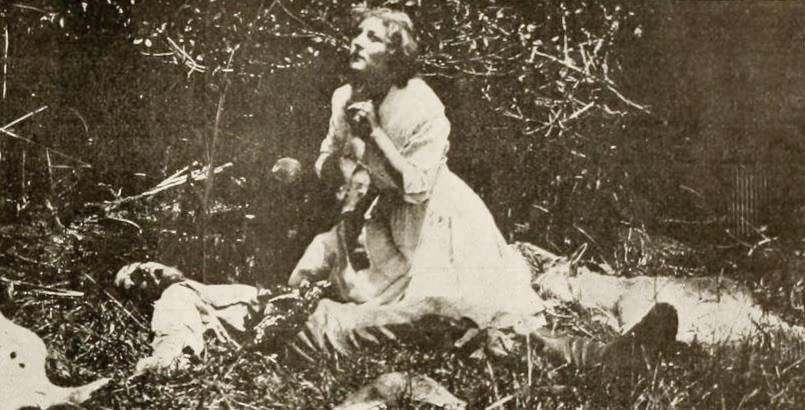
Betty Harte - in The Mystery of the Poison Pool (1914)

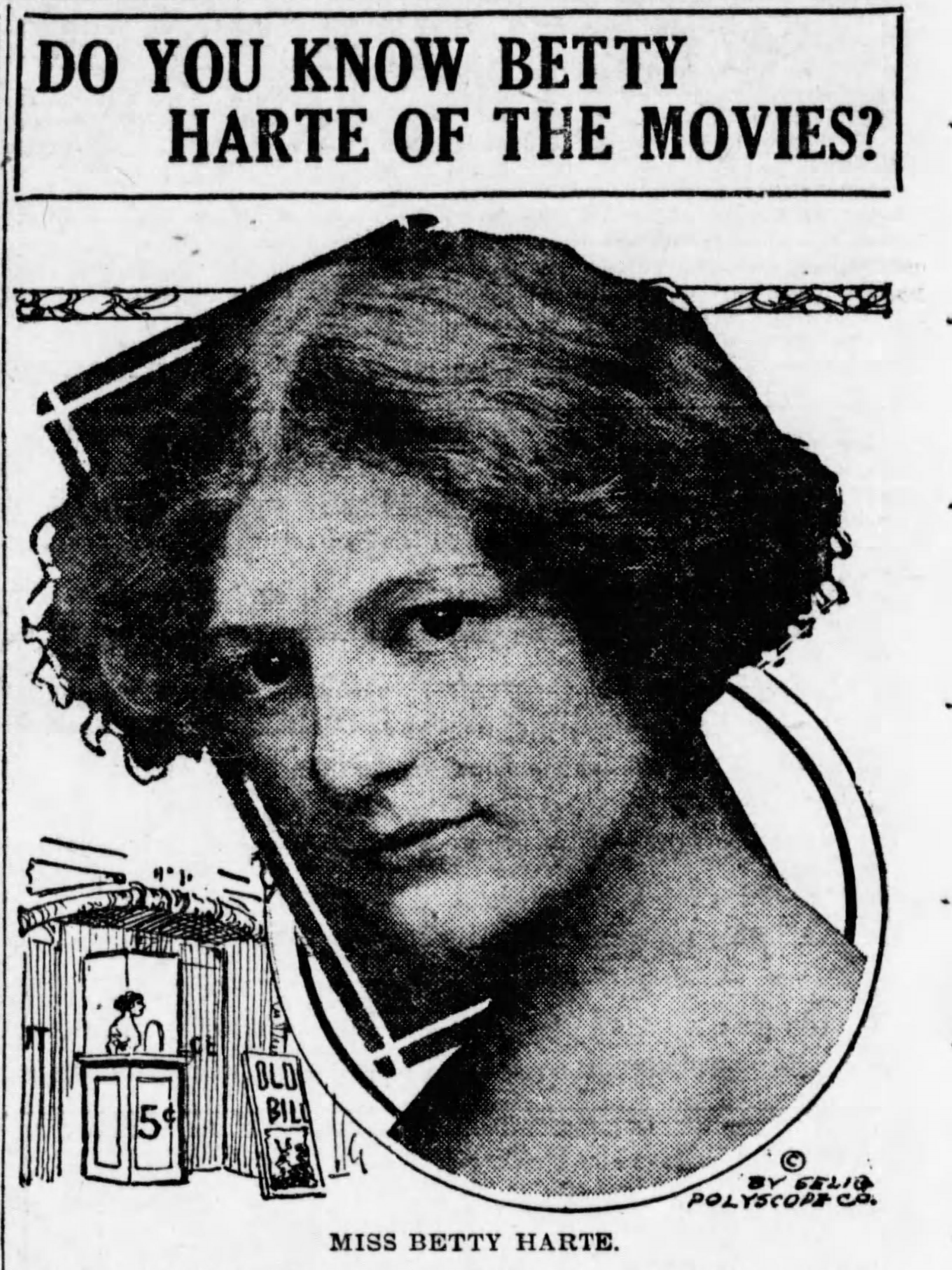
Do You Know Betty Harte of the Movies (1912)

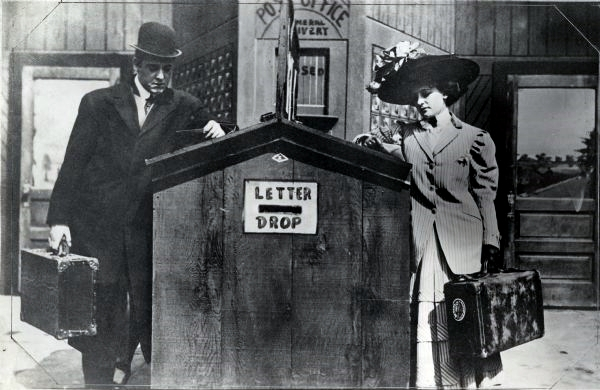
Betty Harte and Bob Leonard in The Politician (1908)

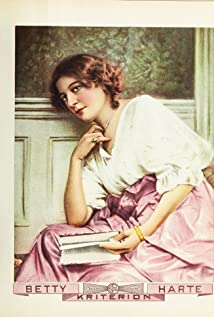
Betty Harte - color photo card - ca. 1910

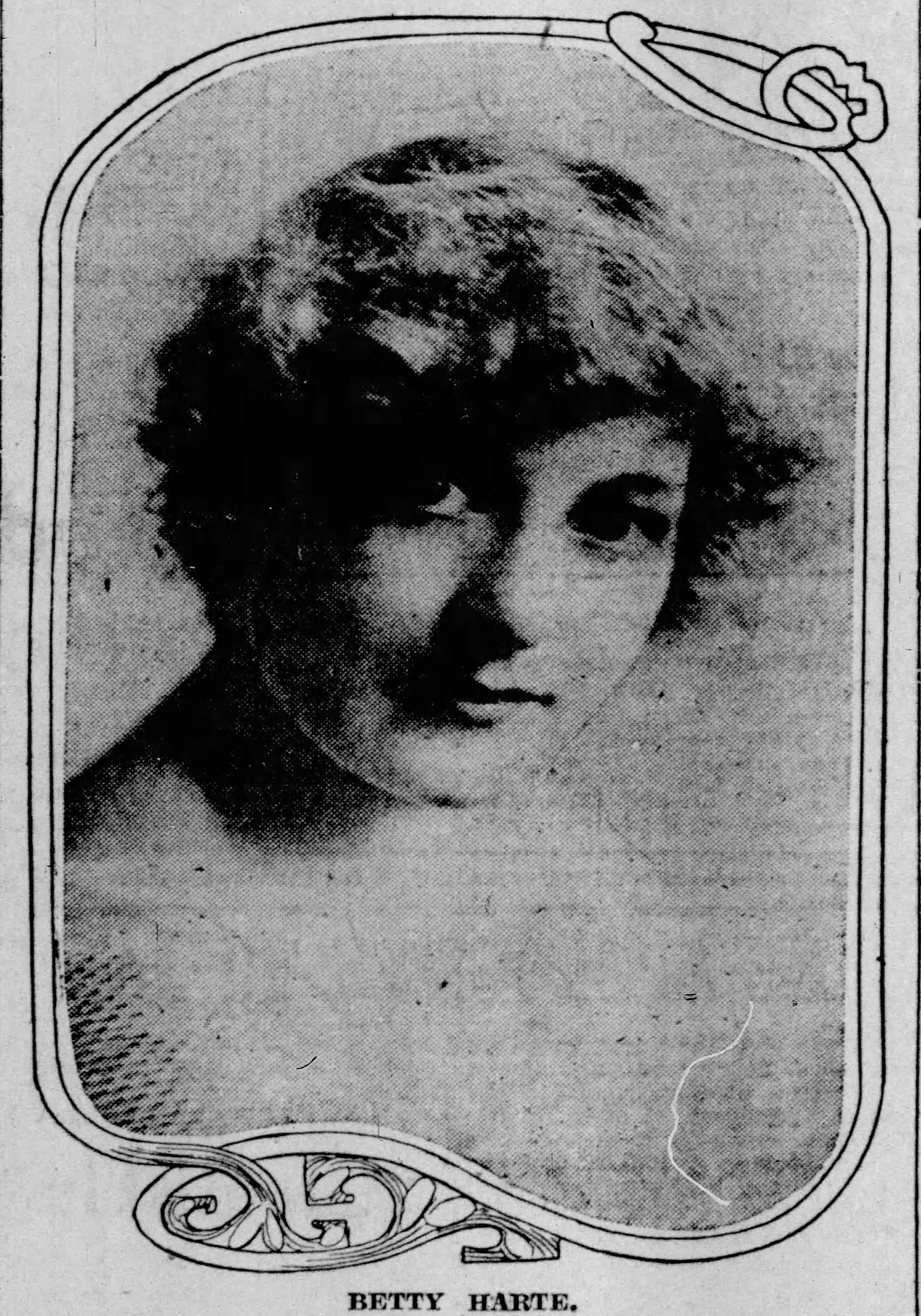
Betty Harte - Dame Industrious (1916)
