= The Bottom of the Well =

1917 film

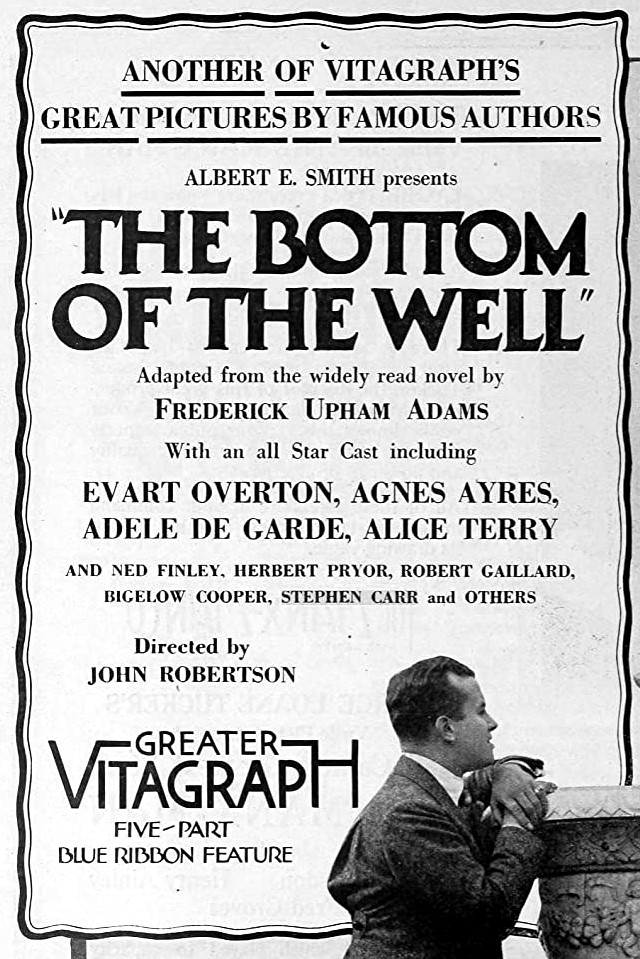
- Contemporary advertisement
- Directed by: John S. Robertson
- Written by: Frederick Upham Adams (novel); Eugene Mullin
- Produced by: Albert E. Smith
- Starring: Evart Overton; Agnes Ayres; Adele DeGarde
- Cinematography: Jules Cronjager; William McCoy
- Production company: Vitagraph Company of America
- Distributed by: Vitagraph Company of America
- Release date: October 22, 1917
- Running time: 50 minutes
- Country: United States
- Languages: Silent; English intertitles

The Bottom of the Well is a 1917 American silent drama film directed by John S. Robertson and starring Evart Overton, Agnes Ayres and Adele DeGarde. It was adapated for the screen by Eugene Mullin from the novel of the same name by Frederick Upham Adams.

== Cast ==
- Evart Overton as Stanley Deane
- Agnes Ayres as Alice Buckingham
- Adele DeGarde as Dorothy Farnsworth
- Ned Finley as Capt. Jake Starke
- Herbert Prior as 'Long Bill' Parker
- Robert Gaillard as David Thomas
- Alice Terry as Anita Thomas
- Bigelow Cooper as Amos Buckingham

== Production ==
The film was one of four produced by Vitagraph as part of their "Best Authors" series. The other films were Dead Shot Baker, The Fettered Woman, and I Will Repay (1917).

== Preservation ==
The Bottom of the Well is currently presumed lost. In February of 2021, the film was cited by the National Film Preservation Board on their Lost U.S. Silent Feature Films list.

== Bibliography ==
- Slide, Anthony. The Big V: A History of the Vitagraph Company. Scarecrow Press, 1987.
