= Carmen (1913 film) =

- Directed by: Stanner E. V. Taylor
- Written by: Theodore Marston
- Based on: novel by Prosper Mérimée
- Produced by: Monopol Film Company; Pat Powers
- Starring: Marion Leonard; Francis McDonald
- Cinematography: H. Lyman Broening
- Distributed by: Monopol Film Company
- Release date: April 1913
- Running time: 3 reels
- Country: USA
- Language: Silent..English titles

Carmen is a 1913 silent film short directed by Stanner E. V. Taylor and starring Marion Leonard. it was produced and distributed by Monopol Film Company.

== Cast ==
- Marion Leonard – Carmen
- Francis McDonald – Don José
