= The Purple Dress =

- Directed by: Martin Justice
- Written by: Fred R. Buckley; O. Henry (story)
- Produced by: Broadway Star Feature Company
- Starring: Agnes Ayres; Adele DeGarde; Edward Earle; Evart Overton; Bernard Siegel
- Release date: May 11, 1918
- Running time: 2 reels
- Country: United States
- Languages: Silent film English intertitles

The Purple Dress is a 1918 two reel silent short film, directed by Martin Justice.

== Cast ==
- Agnes Ayres as Maida
- Adele DeGarde as Grace
- Edward Earle
- Evart Overton as Ramsay
- Bernard Siegel
