= Ben's Kid =

1909 film

- Directed by: Francis Boggs
- Produced by: William Nicholas Selig
- Starring: Fatty Arbuckle
- Cinematography: James A. Crosby
- Production company: Selig Polyscope Company
- Distributed by: Selig Polyscope Company
- Release date: July 1, 1909
- Running time: 1 reel
- Country: United States
- Languages: Silent; English intertitles

Ben's Kid is a 1909 American silent short comedy film featuring Fatty Arbuckle. It was Arbuckle's film debut.

== Cast ==
- Tom Santschi (as Thomas Santschi)
- Harry Todd
- Roscoe Arbuckle

== See also ==
- List of American films of 1909
- Fatty Arbuckle filmography
