= At the Altar =

1909 film directed by D. W. Griffith

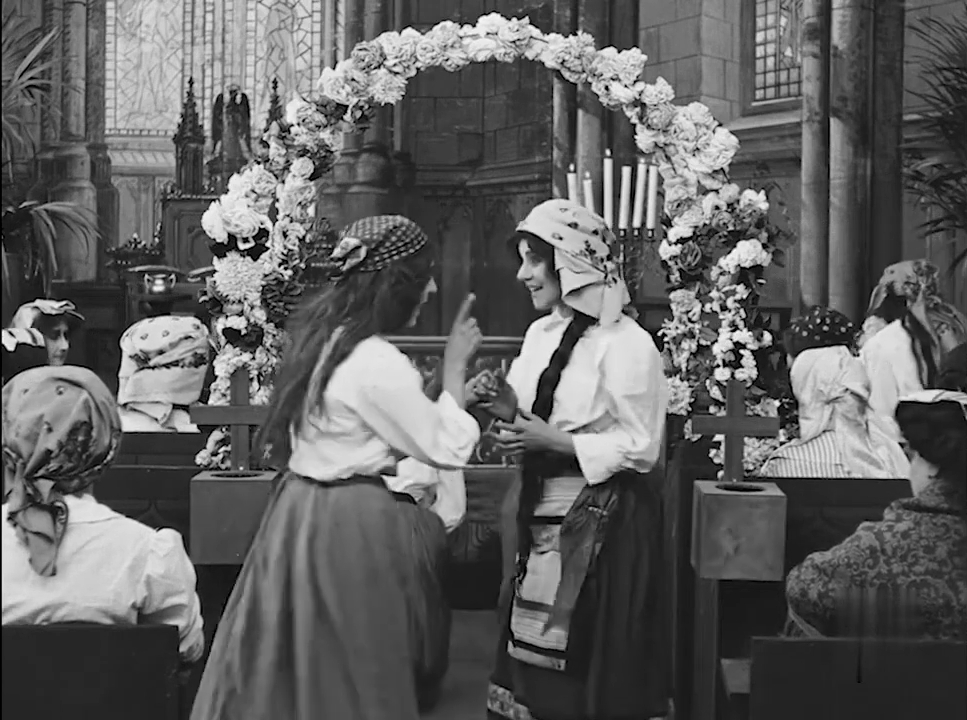
- Directed by: D. W. Griffith
- Written by: D. W. Griffith
- Starring: Marion Leonard
- Cinematography: G. W. Bitzer; Arthur Marvin
- Distributed by: Biograph Company
- Release date: February 25, 1909
- Running time: 11 minutes
- Country: United States
- Language: Silent with English intertitles

At the Altar is a 1909 American silent drama film directed by D. W. Griffith. The film was shot in Fort Lee, New Jersey where early film studios in America's first motion picture industry were based at the beginning of the 20th century. A print of this film is in the film archive of the Library of Congress.

== Plot ==
A rejected admirer sets a trap to kill his sweetheart and her fiancé before they marry, and then commits suicide, leaving a written confession. The confession is found, and a police officer runs to the wedding to save the couple.

== Cast ==
- Marion Leonard as Minnie, the Daughter
- David Miles as Father
- Charles Inslee as Grigo, the Suitor
- Herbert Yost as Giuseppe Cassella
- Anita Hendrie as Mother
- Dorothy West as Minnie's Friend/Dinner Guest

== See also ==
- List of American films of 1909
- 1909 in film
- D. W. Griffith filmography
