= A Life for a Life (1910 film) =

1910 silent short film

- Directed by: Edwin R. Phillips
- Produced by: Vitagraph Company of America
- Starring: Adele DeGarde
- Distributed by: Vitagraph Company of America
- Release date: September 2, 1910
- Running time: 995 ft
- Country: United States
- Language: Silent..English titles

A Life for a Life is a 1910 American silent short film directed by Edward R. Phillips. It was produced by released through the Vitagraph Company of America.

The film survives in the Library of Congress collection.

== Cast ==
- Adele DeGarde
