= Those Awful Hats =

1909 film directed by D. W. Griffith

- Play full film; running time 00:02:44
- Directed by: D. W. Griffith
- Written by: D.W. Griffith
- Starring: Mack Sennett
- Cinematography: G. W. Bitzer
- Release date: January 25, 1909
- Running time: Original length 185 feet (under 3 minutes)
- Country: United States
- Languages: Silent (English intertitles)

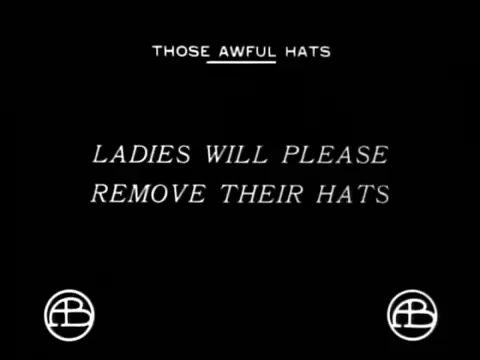
End screen

Those Awful Hats is a 1909 American short comedy film directed by D. W. Griffith and starring Mack Sennett and Flora Finch. It was released on January 25, 1909, by Biograph Studios.

The film takes place in a small, crowded movie theatre while a film is in progress. The patrons are perpetually distracted by people—primarily women—wearing large, ostentatious hats that obstruct everyone else's views of the screen. Slapstick disorder ensues. The film ends with a title card reading, "Ladies Will Please Remove Their Hats."

Archivist David Shepard of Blackhawk Films explained how G. W. Bitzer photographed the film: "The image in the theater and the image on the theater screen were photographed separately, and the final effect was achieved by double printing and use of a traveling matte."

== Release ==
Those Awful Hats was intended not so much as an entertainment subject but as a service to nickelodeon theaters, much as humorous but cautionary trailers are used today before the feature film begins. Biograph recommended Those Awful Hats as "a splendid subject to start a show with instead of the customary slide." The film was restored from a nitrate negative in 1975 by Blackhawk Films, and was offered for sale only briefly, as a limited-edition release. A print of the film is in the film archive of the Library of Congress.

== Cast ==
- Mack Sennett as Man in checkered jacket
- Flora Finch as Woman with largest hat

Theater audience:

- Linda Arvidson
- John R. Cumpson
- George Gebhardt
- Robert Harron
- Anita Hendrie
- Charles Inslee
- Arthur V. Johnson
- Florence Lawrence
- Gertrude Robinson
- Dorothy West

== See also ==
- 1909 in film
- D. W. Griffith filmography
