= The Curtain Pole =

1909 film directed by D. W. Griffith

- PLAY partial film; runtime 00:08:00
- Directed by: D. W. Griffith
- Written by: G. W. Bitzer; D. W. Griffith; Mack Sennett
- Starring: Mack Sennett
- Cinematography: G. W. Bitzer
- Production company: Biograph Studios
- Release date: February 15, 1909
- Running time: 11-12 minutes (1 reel, 765 feet)
- Country: United States
- Language: Silent with English intertitles

The Curtain Pole is a 1909 American silent short comedy film directed by D. W. Griffith. A print of the film still exists. The film was made by the American Mutoscope and Biograph Company when it and many other early film studios in America's first motion picture industry were based in Fort Lee, New Jersey at the beginning of the 20th century.

== Plot ==
According to a film magazine, "At the Edwards' home there is to be a house party, and, unfortunately, Mr. E. has an attack of gout, which incapacitates him so as to throw the burden of the arrangements on the women folks. Everything is in readiness when the guests begin to arrive, except the hanging of a pair of portieres, which Monsieur DuPont, an ingratiating Frenchman, insists upon doing. In the attempt the chair slips and he falls, breaking the pole. He, of course, insists upon procuring a new pole, but Edwards tries to persuade him not to, but he says: "Oui! Oui! I bring you ze one grand pole, if I have to get ze North Pole." Away he goes, and is but a short distance when he meets a friend, who invites him to sip a couple of absinthe frappes, after which he is more intensely charged with the phlogistic determination to get that pole. Arriving at the store, a pole is selected; but not remembering the width of the door, he takes the whole length, 18 or 20 feet. Back he starts — Gee, Whiz! the limit! The absinthian vapors arising to his brain make him a bit wobbly, and the pole in his hands becomes an instrument of destruction. After a series of indescribable incidents, he enlists the services of a cab, the driver of which is extremely boozy. Away goes this Pegasus, driven by a crapulous Eos, with a wild, vertiginous Frenchman as fare, holding the devastating pole across his lap, with 8 feet protruding from each side, mowing down everything within its reach — lampposts, fruit stands, market stalls, carriages, etc., all fall, until at last the home of Edwards is reached, where, in the meantime, a pole has been gotten placed in position and the Frenchman forgotten. He is a wreck as he enters with the pole, and no one pays the slightest attention to him, which makes him furious, and in a rage he bites the pole in two."

== Cast ==
- Mack Sennett as Monsieur Dupont
- Harry Solter as Mr. Edwards
- Florence Lawrence as Mrs. Edwards

== Credit ==
Sennett directed this film with D. W. Griffith, his first, but was uncredited for his work.

== See also ==
- List of American films of 1909
- D. W. Griffith filmography
- List of directorial debuts
