= A Drunkard's Reformation =

1909 film directed by D. W. Griffith

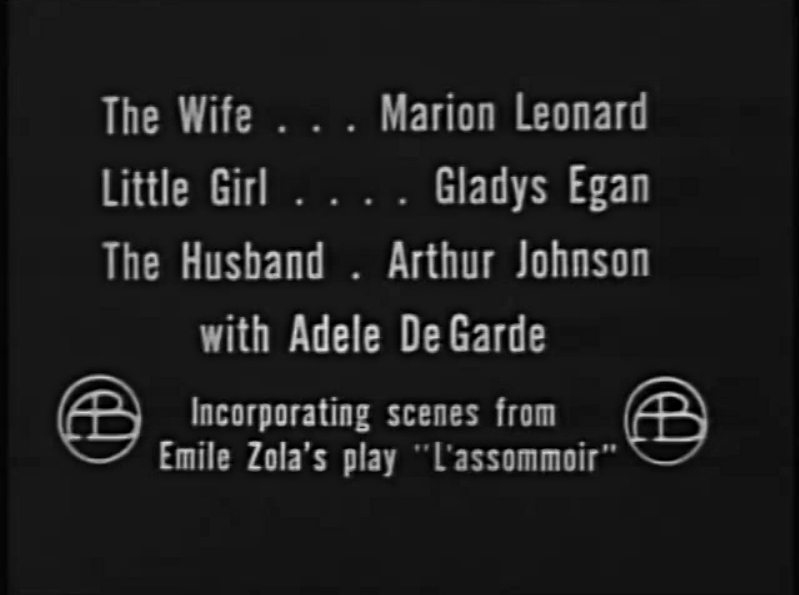
- Opening credits (later insertion) in film
- Directed by: D. W. Griffith
- Written by: D. W. Griffith
- Starring: Arthur V. Johnson
- Cinematography: G. W. Bitzer
- Distributed by: American Mutoscope and Biograph Company
- Release date: April 1, 1909
- Running time: 14-15 minutes (original length 983 feet)
- Country: United States
- Language: Silent with English intertitles

A Drunkard's Reformation is a 1909 American drama film directed by D. W. Griffith. Prints of the film survive in the film archive of the Library of Congress. The American Mutoscope and Biograph Company advertised the feature as "The most powerful temperance lecture ever depicted".

Play partial copy of film; runtime 00:09:28

A Drunkard's Reformation, Different version (1909)

== Plot ==
In its March 27, 1909 issue, the New York-based trade journal The Moving Picture World provides the following description of the film's plot:

The story told is a simple one, and grips from the very start. John Wharton, the husband of a true and trusting wife and father of an eight-year-old girl, through the association of rakish companions becomes addicted to the drink habit, and while the demon rum has not fastened its tentacles firmly, yet there is no question that given free rein the inevitable would culminate in time. Arriving home one afternoon in a wine besotted condition, he is indeed a terrifying spectacle to his little family. Later, after he has slept off the effects to some extent, while at supper, the little girl shows him two tickets for the theater, begging him to take her. After some persuasion he consents to go. The play is a dramatization of Emile Zola's "L'Assommoir," which shows how short a journey it is from peace and happiness to woe and despair by the road of rum. Here the picture shows both the action and the play and the psychological influence it has on the audience, Wharton especially. Here is shown a most clever piece of motion picture producing, portraying the downward path of the young man who was induced to take his first drink: how it finally became an unconquerable habit, causing poverty and suffering for his wife and child and death for himself, while at the same time presenting a sermon to Wharton in front, sinking deeper and deeper into his heart, until at the final curtain he is a changed man, going homeward with a firm determination that he will drink no more, which he promises his wife upon his return. Two years later we find the little family seated, happy and peaceful, at their fireside and we know that the promise has been kept.

== Cast ==
- Arthur V. Johnson as John Wharton
- Linda Arvidson as Mrs. John Wharton
- Adele DeGarde as The Wharton Daughter
- Charles Avery as In the Play
- John R. Cumpson as In the Orchestra / In the Bar
- Robert Harron as Theatre Usher
- Anita Hendrie as In the Play / In the Audience
- Florence Lawrence as In the Play
- Marion Leonard as In the Play
- David Miles as In the Play
- Owen Moore as In the Play
- Tom Moore as In the Audience
- Herbert Prior as In the Bar
- Mack Sennett as In the Play / In the Orchestra / In the Bar
- Harry Solter as In the Play
- Herbert Yost as In the Play

== Production ==
The drama was filmed in four days–February 25–27 and March 1, 1909–in New York City at Biograph’s studio, which was located in a converted brownstone mansion in Manhattan at 11 East 14th.

== Background ==
A moving picture house manager in Moline, Illinois, George Dehl, promised to donate $500 to a local hospital if he could not produce films that have the best sermons beat. Dehl proposed "that they bring the Reverend Billy Sunday to Moline and have him preach the best sermon in the list, and they bring a great temperance lecturer here and instruct him to make his best effort". Dehl said once they had left, he would put on two reels of film at his theater, and if the public does not vote one of them a greater temperance sermon than what the speaker had delivered, and the other a greater religious appeal than the sermon by Sunday, he would donate the money to a local hospital. The films he had referred for showing were The Drunkard's Reformation and The Resurrection.

Variety reported that Biograph had received a letter from an exhibitor in an Iowa town, stating that when the film was shown there, it had caused the town to "go dry" at the election which occurred the week after it had been featured. The letter went on to say that the exhibitor had been visited by a delegation of "The Wets", asking for the picture not to be shown. The man refused and the town "went prohibition by a big majority".

== See also ==
- List of American films of 1909
- D. W. Griffith filmography
