= The Medicine Bottle =

1909 film directed by D. W. Griffith

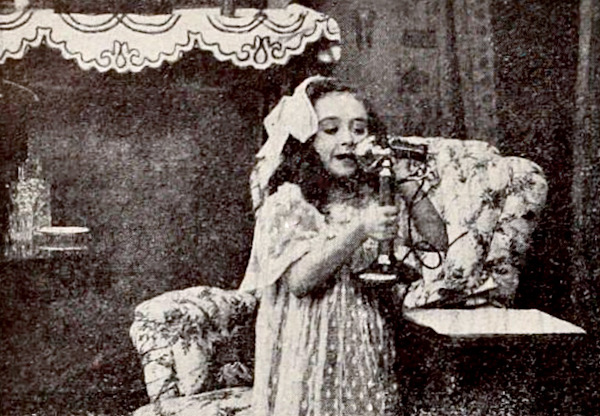
- Scene with "Alice Ross" (Adele DeGarde) talking on candlestick telephone
- Directed by: D. W. Griffith
- Written by: D. W. Griffith
- Produced by: American Mutoscope and Biograph Company, Manhattan, New York
- Starring: Florence Lawrence; Adele DeGarde; Marion Leonard
- Cinematography: G. W. Bitzer
- Release date: March 29, 1909
- Running time: 7 minutes, 472 feet (part of split reel) (Note: According to the reference How Movies Work by Bruce F. Kawin (New York: Macmillan Publishing Company, 1987, pp. 46-47), a full 1000-foot reel of film in the silent era had, on average, a maximum running time of 15 minutes. Also, silent films were generally projected at a "standard" speed of 16 frames per second, much slower than the 24 frames of later sound films.)
- Country: United States
- Languages: Silent; English intertitles

The Medicine Bottle is a 1909 American silent thriller film written and directed by D. W. Griffith, produced by the American Mutoscope and Biograph Company in New York City, and starring Florence Lawrence, Adele DeGarde, and Marion Leonard. At its release in March 1909, the short was distributed to theaters on a "split reel", which was a single projection reel that accommodated more than one film. This drama shared its reel with another Biograph short directed by Griffith, the comedy Jones and His New Neighbors.

Original contact-print paper rolls of both motion pictures, as well as projectable safety-stock copies of them, are preserved in the Library of Congress.

== Plot ==
The drama presents a suspenseful story involving two small, nearly identical bottles: one filled with a much-needed liquid medicine; the other, with a topical antiseptic solution that is a deadly poison if taken internally. After the bottles accidentally get switched, a young woman in a desperate race against time tries repeatedly to telephone her seven-year-old daughter Alice to prevent the girl from giving her sick grandmother the poison. A more detailed description of the plot follows, one published in the April 3, 1909 issue of the New York trade publication The Film Index:

Mrs. Ross, whose mother is very ill, has in attendance a trained nurse, who has received an urgent message to come to her own home, owing to the illness of her sister. As Mrs. Ross is dressed and ready to attend an afternoon tea at Mrs. Parker's, this forced absence of the nurse is very inopportune. However, little Alice, Mrs. Ross' seven-year-old daughter, is a bright child, so she feels that she can trust her to look after her grandma, and give her the medicine at the regular intervals. Mrs. Ross, herself, is suffering from a painful abrasion on her hand, for which she has procured an antiseptic to bathe it with, which is a deadly poison. It happens that the antiseptic and grandma's medicine are contained in similar shaped bottles, and Mrs. Ross in her hurry and excitement takes away the wrong bottle. While at Mrs. Parker's, the hostess cuts her finger with a paper knife and Mrs. Ross offers her the antiseptic to bathe it, when she discovers she has carried away the medicine, leaving the poison for the child to give grandma. Looking at the clock, she finds it is on the hour of the administering of the dose. The poor woman is beside herself in fearful helplessness, when Mrs. Parker suggests the telephone. This she tries, and she is put in further trepidation at her inability to get connection, for at Central the operators are too busy chatting to take notice. She at length gets her home and is relieved to learn from the child that grandma has not been given the poison, as baby spilt the first spoonful she poured out. (Note: Additional plot summaries of this film can be found on page 376 in the March 27, 1909 issue of the New York trade journal The Moving Picture World and on page 203 of Kemp P. Niver's extensive 1985 reference Early Motion Pictures: The Paper Print Collection in the Library of Congress.)

== Cast ==
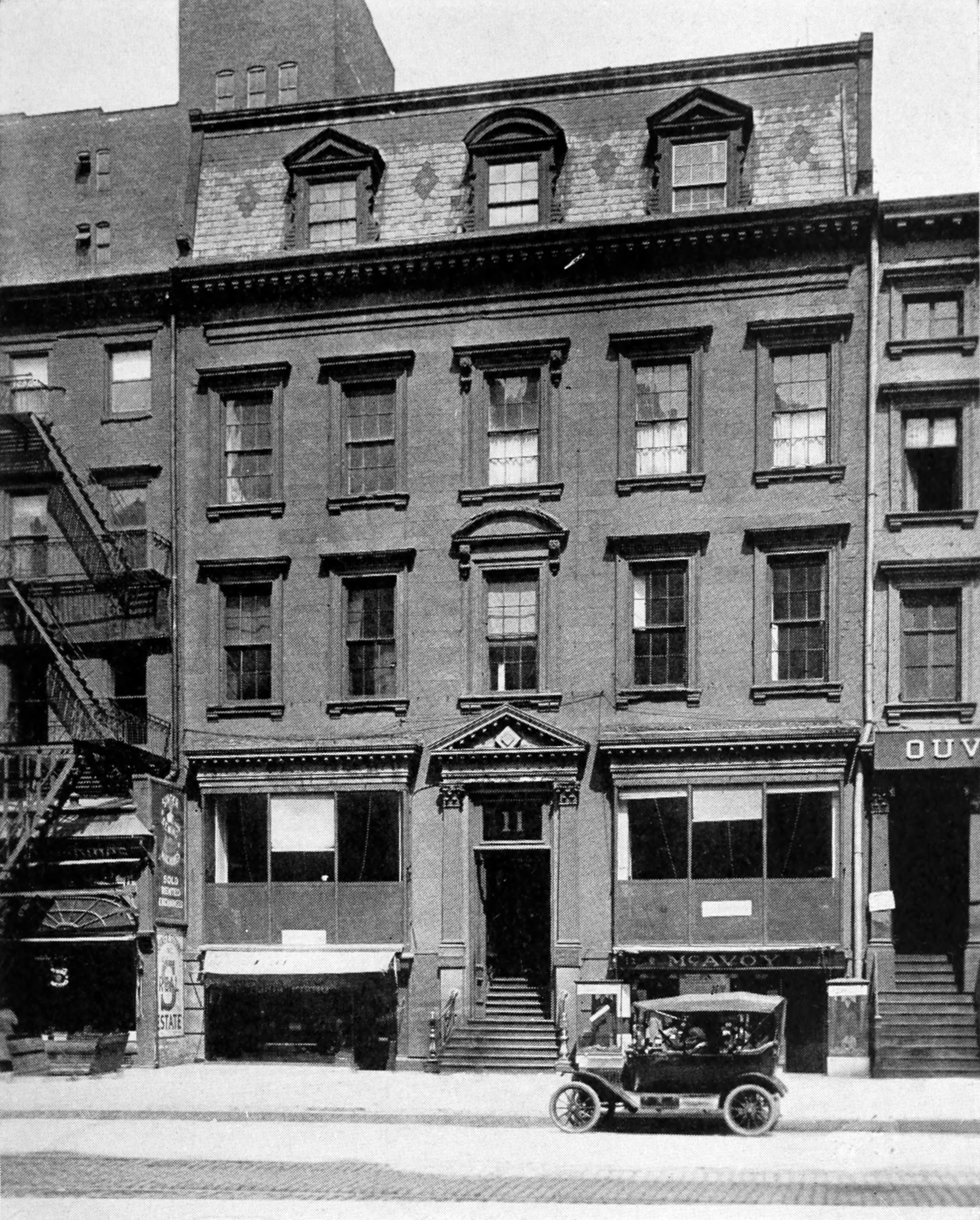
Biograph's Manhattan studio, where The Medicine Bottle was filmed in 1909

- Florence Lawrence as Mrs. Ross
- Adele DeGarde as Alice, Mrs. Ross's daughter
- Marion Leonard as Mrs. Parker
- Linda Arvidson as telephone operator
- Anita Hendrie as party guest
- Dorothy West as party guest
- David Miles as party guest
- Herbert Yost as party guest
- Mack Sennett as party guest
- Jeanie MacPherson in unverified role (possibly a telephone operator) (Note: See Niver in cited reference Early Motion Pictures: The Paper Print Collection in the Library of Congress, p. 203.)
- Min Johnson in unverified role (possibly another telephone operator) (Note: According to Biograph cinematographer Billy Bitzer, Min Johnson was in the cast of The Medicine Bottle, although he did not specify her role. Refer to the cited reference D. W. Griffith and the Biograph Company. Metuchen, New Jersey and London: The Scarecrow Press, 1985, p. 42.)

== Production ==
The screenplay for this short is credited to D. W. Griffith, who also directed the picture at Biograph's main studio, which in 1909 was located inside a large renovated brownstone mansion in New York City, in Manhattan, at 11 East 14th Street. The drama was filmed there on interior sets in four days—on February 3, 4, 10, and 16, 1909—by Biograph cinematographer G. W. "Billy" Bitzer.

=== Sets and editing ===
Set composition, lighting, and filming The Medicine Bottle were collaborative efforts between Griffith and Bitzer, who used three interior sets or "units" at Biograph's Manhattan facility in making this production: a home interior where the bottle of poison and the bottle of medicine for the sick grandmother are accidentally switched; the parlor where the Mrs. Ross attends a party with friends and where she discovers the bottle mix-up; and finally the telephone exchange, where Mrs. Ross tries desperately to call her daughter and connect with young Alice through "a rather lazy crew of telephone operators." American film historian and university professor Joyce E. Jesionowski in her 1987 book Thinking in Pictures: Dramatic Structure in D. W. Griffith's Biograph Films regards The Medicine Bottle as a notable production in the director's early filmography, a release that illustrates his growing awareness of the power of film editing, in particular the intersplicing of close-ups to underscore visually important actions in a scene as well as the impact of quick back-and-forth cutting between sets to build dramatic tension for audiences. According to Jesionowski, the editing that Griffith employed in this short thriller redefined the need for actual extended physical space to represent distance on screen:

[The film] is already a significant variation on the race to the rescue, because instead of rushing home, the mother stays in place, deciding to call the little girl and warn her not to administer the poison. The intercutting between [the three sets] involves no orienting activity at all, quite a unique situation in so early a film. Intercutting takes over from physical activity to provide the energy of the film, and both the pace of the activity and the pace at which information is revealed to the audience are created by the rhythm of the intercutting...The Medicine Bottle shows that locale in film was beginning to have a completely new definition, which did not necessarily have anything to do with extending space through walking or chasing. (Note: In addition to serving as a professor in the Film Department at Binghamton University (SUNY), Joyce E. Jesionowski taught film history and production at Columbia University, Pratt Institute, and Hofstra University.)

Jesionowski's observations regarding Griffith's increased attention to camera setups and editing may explain why a short like The Medicine Bottle, which required no location shooting and had a final print length of only seven minutes—a runtime even quite modest by 1909 production standards—required four days to shoot.

=== Biograph's uncredited actors ===
Identifying cast members in early Biograph releases such as The Medicine Bottle is made more difficult by the fact that the studio, as a matter of company policy, did not begin publicly crediting its performers on screen, in trade publications, or in newspaper advertisements until years after this short's release. All the players in this short were not credited in their roles on screen and in print, as were the rest of Biograph's relatively small staff of "photoplayers" and crew members in other productions in 1909. At the time of this thriller's release, Lawrence was already gaining widespread celebrity among filmgoers. Few people, though, outside the motion picture industry knew her name, so in 1909 and for the remainder of her time working at Biograph, the actress was referred to by admirers and in news articles in the media simply as "the Biograph girl". Publicly, the studio would not reveal the names of its actors or credit them on screen and in film promotions until 1913.

Linda Arvidson, who portrays one of the telephone operators in this production, was actually the wife of D. W. Griffith in 1909. If fact, the couple had married three years earlier. Biograph's policy of not identifying cast or crew extended as well to both Arvidson and Griffith, neither of whom received a screen credit, any specific recognition in advertisements for the film, nor was mentioned in any other publicity for The Medicine Bottle.

== Release and reception ==
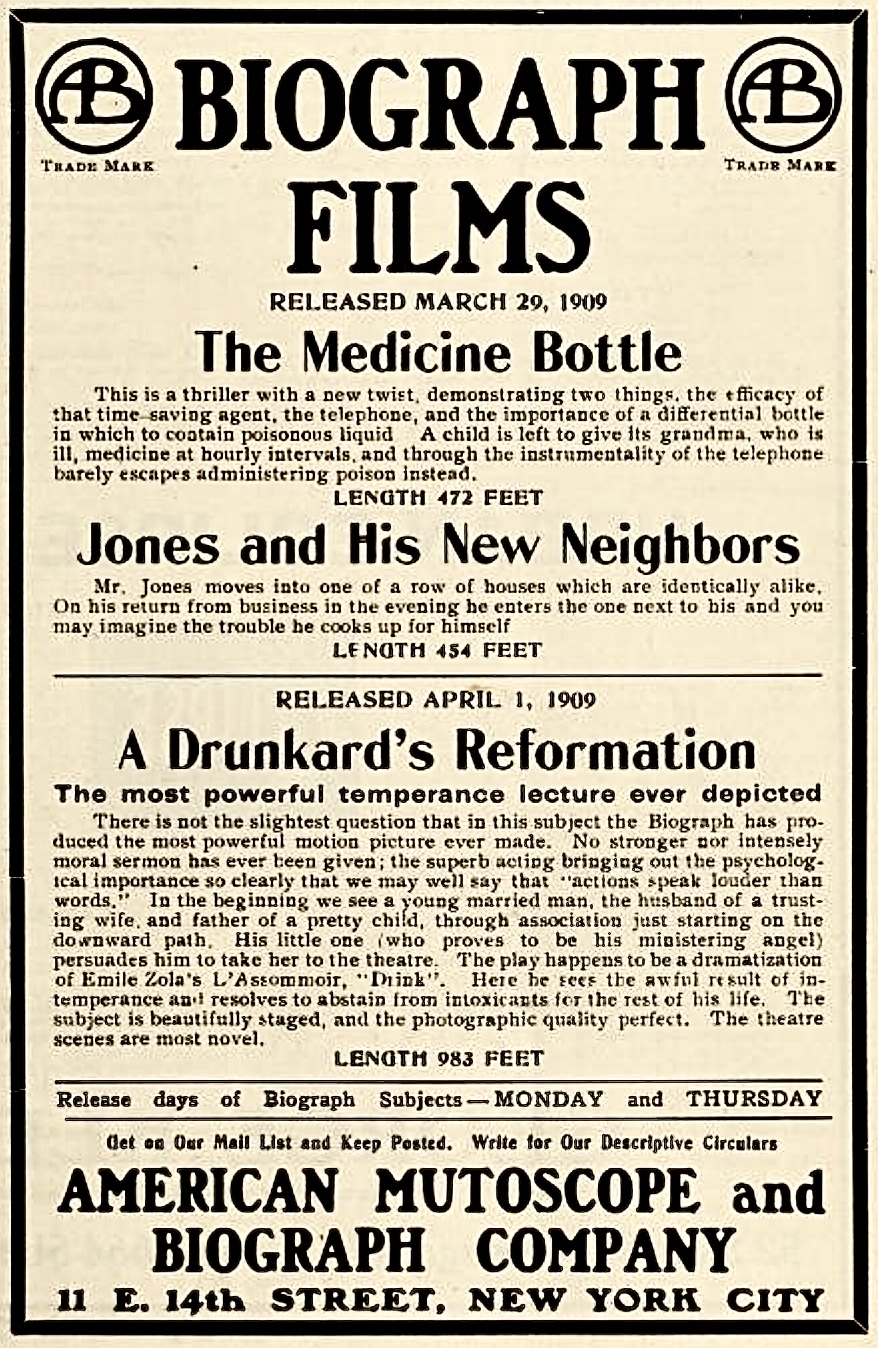
Biograph promotion for 1909 releases, including this film

After their release on March 29, 1909, The Medicine Bottle and its split-reel companion Jones and His New Neighbors circulated to theaters throughout the United States and continued to be promoted for weeks in film-industry publications and then advertised in city and small-town newspapers well into 1910. Alfred Gleason, a reviewer for Variety and a founding member of the popular New York trade paper's editorial staff, was particularly impressed with the pace and "unique" structure of The Medicine Bottle. In his April 3, 1909 review titled "'The Wrong Bottle' Manhattan", Greason, writing under the pen name "Rush", alludes to the effective work of Biograph's uncredited "producer", a term that in 1909 was used synonymously with the position of director on screen productions:

The Biograph studios must have a producer who is a wonder at dramatic trick art. In this subject a situation is worked up to a tremendous pitch of suspense by alternately shifting the spectator to either end of the telephone wire while life and death hang on the outcome of a telephone call. No better handling of a dramatic subject comes to mind....The tension of suspense tightens almost painfully until, just in the nick of time, the telephone connection is established and the sick woman's life is saved. The production is a remarkable one. As a bit of strong dramatic work it stands unique.

=== Additional 1909 reactions to film ===
Critical reactions to the film were not universally positive in 1909. Reviewers for the trade journal The Moving Picture World were not as impressed as Greason with the content and overall structure of the film. In the journal's April 3 issue—the same date of issue as the cited Variety issue—a staff reviewer simply identified as "The Kicker" criticizes the plot for being muddled in its early scenes, resulting in giving many theatergoers an initial "bad impression" that the bottle switch was not accidental but deliberate, an act done with murderous intent:

The plot of "The Medicine Bottle" is natural enough and would have made a very good dramatic film if the producers had been more careful in the actions. By a mistake the producers give the sad and painful impression that the bottles have been mixed intentionally for a criminal purpose, instead of by a mere accident, as described in the sketch. The daughter shows her displeasure at the sickness of her mother, which detains her from joining her friends. When the old lady calls for a glass of water, the daughter hands her the glass in such a reluctant manner that when she accidentally mixes the bottles and gives instructions to the little girl how to give the medicine to the grandmother, the audience is badly shocked at this supposed murderess, who not having the courage to commit the act herself, takes an innocent and sweet little girl as her accomplice.
Eventually the truth appears when we see the daughter calling on the 'phone and getting excited as she cannot connect. We understand that she is not a murderess, that the bottles have been mixed accidentally, but it is too late; the bad impression left its mark.

"The Kicker" continues his criticism of the film in the same April 3 review, contending that the flippant portrayal of the telephone operators as being extremely irresponsible while on duty is wholly unrealistic and a true insult to that workforce:

In the same film the producers badly exaggerate the telephone service. We know that the "hello" girls are young, full of life and fun, and, as young girls, have many amusing stories to narrate. On the other hand, we must also remember that these girls are under very strict discipline, consequently the prolonged negligence, as shown on the screen, is materially an impossibility; not only impossible, but an insult to the numerous girls who are working long hours at small pay. Instead of showing so many times the switchboard with the girls talking and not answering the calls, the producers could have found another excuse for the delay in the service, as an accident to the wire, etc.

Another reviewer, an anonymous one in the same issue of The Moving Picture World, judges the drama's acting to be "especially good" but also notes, "The action in some parts is too long drawn out."

=== The "thriller" continues to circulate ===
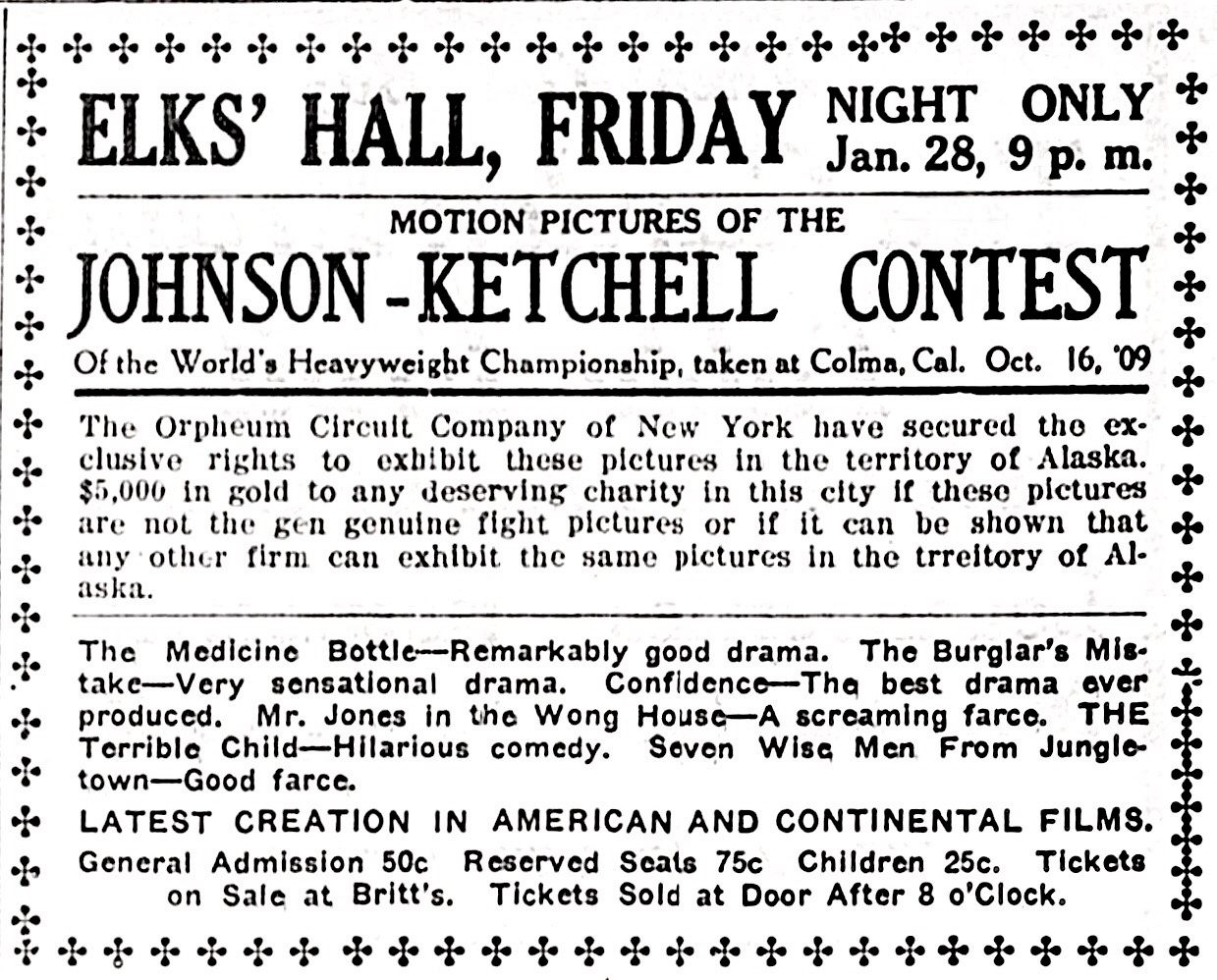
A January 1910 advertisement for The Medicine Bottle being presented with other films in Skagway, Alaska

By October 1909, the two split-reel shorts were still being widely distributed and were finally reaching many small-town theaters. A writer that month for the newspaper The Brunswick News in Georgia was highly complimentary of The Medicine Bottle, but, unlike Alfred Greason, he evidently did not even see the film before providing readers with his brief assessment of the production. Possibly confusing the thriller with Jones and His New Neighbors, the reviewer in the October 7 issue of The Brunswick News confidently declares, "'The Medicine Bottle' is another comedy drama full of fun", adding "If this picture does not make you laugh nothing will." Three months later—over 4,100 miles from Brunswick and nearly a year after the release of The Medicine Bottle and its split-reel companion—copies of the shorts finally arrived in the United States territory of Alaska, in the port town of Skagway. There the thriller was advertised on January 27, 1910, issue of The Daily Alaskan as a "Remarkably good drama" and promoted as an upcoming attraction being presented at the local Elks' Hall with the "screaming farce" Jones and His New Neighbors, which the newspaper misidentifies and misspells in its advertisement as "Mr. Jones in the W[r]ong House". Five additional motion pictures were promoted as well on the same bill, with the main feature being footage of the heavyweight championship fight between boxers Jack Johnson and Stanley Ketchel, a bout that had occurred three months earlier in Colma, California before a crowd of 10,000 spectators.

== Preservation status ==
Photographic prints and a film negative and positive of The Medicine Bottle survive in the Library of Congress (LC), which holds a 206-foot paper roll of contact prints produced directly frame-by-frame from the comedy's original 35mm master negative. (Note: The print of The Medicine Bottle preserved in the Library of Congress is numbered "FLA5556"; the negative copy, "FRA2425".) Submitted by Biograph to the United States government in 1909, shortly before the film's release, the roll is part of the original documentation required by federal authorities for motion-picture companies to obtain copyright protection for their productions. While the LC's paper roll of the film is certainly not projectable, a negative copy of the roll's paper images was made and transferred onto modern polyester-based safety film stock to produce a positive print for screening. Those copies were made as part of a preservation project carried out during the 1950s and early 1960s by Kemp R. Niver and other LC staff, who restored more than 3,000 early paper rolls of film images from the library's collection and created safety-stock copies.

== See also ==
D. W. Griffith filmography
