= In the Sultan's Power =

1909 American silent film directed by Francis Boggs

- Directed by: Francis Boggs
- Produced by: William N. Selig
- Starring: Hobart Bosworth; Betty Harte; Tom Santschi
- Production company: Selig Polyscope Company
- Release date: June 17, 1909
- Running time: 1 reel (approx. 10–12 minutes)
- Country: United States
- Language: Silent

In the Sultan's Power is a 1909 American silent adventure-drama short film directed by Francis Boggs and produced by William N. Selig for the Selig Polyscope Company. The film starred Hobart Bosworth, Betty Harte, and Tom Santschi, and was released on June 17, 1909. It was one of the first narrative films shot entirely in the Los Angeles area.

== Plot ==
The film follows American traveler Jack Thornton, who rescues a French nobleman's daughter, Flora, from the harem of a tyrannical Turkish nobleman, Osman Bey. Jack infiltrates the Sultan's palace at night and incites a revolt that liberates Flora and deposes Osman Bey. The film exemplifies the melodramatic "Oriental adventure" genre of the time.

== Cast ==
- Hobart Bosworth as Jack Thornton
- Betty Harte as Flora Dupont
- Tom Santschi as Osman Bey
- Stella Adams
- Frank Montgomery
- E. Vivian
- Robert Z. Leonard

== Production ==
The film was produced by the Selig Polyscope Company and shot in early 1909 in Los Angeles, California. It was filmed at an open-air lot behind a Chinese laundry at 7th and Olive Streets in downtown Los Angeles and at the Hotel Wentworth in Pasadena. It was among the earliest narrative films made in Los Angeles and helped establish the city as a viable location for film production.

Some sources identify In the Sultan’s Power as the first dramatic film shot entirely in Los Angeles, though others suggest that The Heart of a Race Tout (also 1909) may have preceded it.

== Historical significance ==
In the Sultan’s Power is considered historically significant for:

- Being one of the first narrative films shot entirely in Los Angeles.
- Marking the screen debut of stage actor Hobart Bosworth.
- Initiating Selig's production operations on the West Coast, laying groundwork for the film industry's migration to California.

== Reception ==
Contemporary reviews are scarce. Modern film historians often reference the film for its production and historical importance rather than its artistic quality. A 1960 retrospective described it as "a miserable little picture" but praised its role in launching Bosworth's film career.

== Preservation ==
In the Sultan’s Power is presumed lost. No known prints survive, and its survival status is listed as unknown in film databases. A copyright registration for the film exists in the Library of Congress dated 1913, under "World’s Best Film Company," an alternate name used by Selig.

== See also ==
- List of lost films
- Selig Polyscope Company
- Francis Boggs
- Hobart Bosworth

== Sources ==
- Krist, Gary (2018). The Mirage Factory: Illusion, Imagination, and the Invention of Los Angeles. Crown. ISBN 9780451496386.
- "Entertainment Industry Historic Context Statement" (PDF). SurveyLA.
