= Frederick Upham Adams =

American inventor, writer, and organizer (1859–1921)

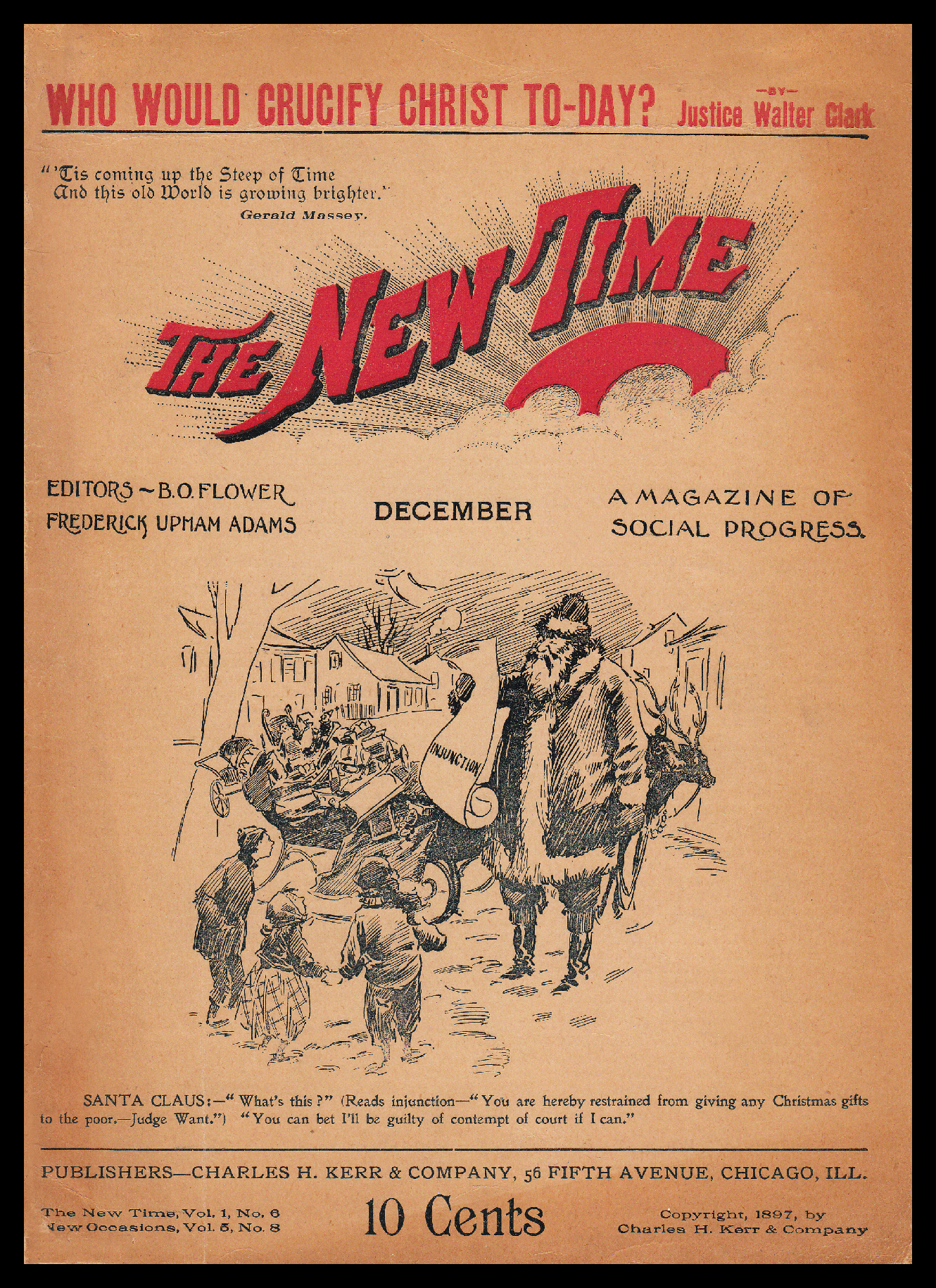
The New Time, December 1897, a social reform monthly edited by Adams

Frederick Upham Adams (December 10, 1859 – August 28, 1921) was an American inventor, writer, editor, and political organizer. He was born in Boston, Massachusetts, the son of an American Civil War veteran and mechanical engineer. He died on August 28, 1921, at Larchmont, New York. In 1886, he invented the electric light post.

Late in 1896 Adams wrote a social reform novel published by Charles H. Kerr & Company of Chicago. He was co-editor of the monthly reform magazine The New Time in 1897 and 1898. He wrote exclusively for the magazine, which was also published by Kerr, according to the publisher mid-1897.

Adams was one of the principle organizers of a short-lived political organization called The Majority Rule League of the United States. Part of the platform of this organization was that majority rule of the people should prevail and that corporate entities and especially monopolies should be taken out of national politics. On the title page of a January 1898 pamphlet by Adams which outlines the "platform" of The Majority Rule League of the United States ("Drafted After Wide Correspondence"), is a brief statement of purpose, to wit: "A plan for a permanent organization of the people in their respective precincts with a view of substituting direct legislation by majority vote for the existing system of corporation legislation by purchased vote."

== Books ==
- President John Smith: The Story of a Peaceful Revolution (Chi.: Charles H. Kerr & Co, 1897), LCCN 05-42991; reprinted as President John Smith (1971)
- The Majority Rule League of the United States : Drafted After Wide Correspondence, Unity Library No. 78, (Charles H. Kerr & Company, Chicago, January 1898) (30 page stapled pamphlet, setting forth Majority Rule League of the United States platform and organizational tenets)
- The Kidnapped Millionaires: A Tale of Wall Street and the Tropics (Bos.: Lothrop Publ Co, 1901)
- John Burt (Phi.: D. Biddle, 1903)
- John Henry Smith: A Humorous Romance of Outdoor Life, illustrated for Mr. Smith by A. B. Frost (Doubleday, Page & Company, 1905), LCCN 05-16520
- The Bottom of the Well (NY: G. W. Dillingham Co, 1906)
- The Conquest of the Tropics: The Story of the Creative Enterprises Conducted by the United Fruit Company (Doubleday, Romance of Big Business no. 1, 1914)
