= A Fool's Revenge =

1909 film directed by D. W. Griffith

- Directed by: D. W. Griffith
- Written by: D. W. Griffith; Victor Hugo
- Starring: Owen Moore
- Cinematography: G. W. Bitzer
- Release date: March 4, 1909
- Running time: 11 minutes (one reel)
- Country: United States
- Language: Silent

A Fool's Revenge is a 1909 American silent short drama film directed by D. W. Griffith. It is based on the 1832 Victor Hugo play Le roi s'amuse.

== Cast ==
- Owen Moore as The Duke
- Charles Inslee as The Fool
- Marion Leonard as The Daughter
- Florence Lawrence
