= Adele DeGarde =

American actress

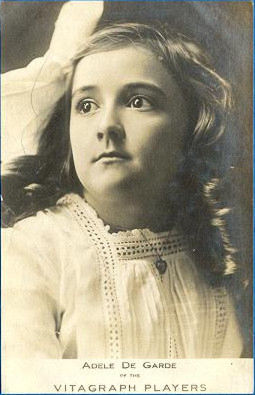
- c. 1909
- Born: Adelaide De Gard; May 3, 1899; Brooklyn, New York
- Died: November 1972 (aged 73); Brooklyn, New York
- Other name: Adele De Garde
- Occupation: Actor
- Years active: 1908–1918
- Spouse: Harry Jespersen

Adele DeGarde (born Adelaide De Gard, also credited Adele De Garde; May 3, 1899 – November 1972) was an American silent film actress, who performed in at least 114 productions between 1908 and 1918. A native of Brooklyn, New York, she initially worked in uncredited parts under the direction of D. W. Griffith at Biograph Studios in Manhattan and later became a screen star for Vitagraph Studios, often specializing in ingénue roles.

== Career ==
In 1908, when pictures were looked at with a bit of apprehension, DeGarde (at the age of eight) began to appear in Vitagraph Studios. DeGarde and her friend, Kenneth Casey, played mischievous, spoiled, or ill-treated children in many films. As new stars joined Vitagraph, DeGarde and Kenneth acted with them. In several films that featured "two-generation" or "from-child-to-woman" type plots, the film would open with DeGarde as the child heroine and finish with Leah Baird, Edith Storey, or Dorothy Kelly taking over the role as an adult.

DeGarde became too old to portray little-girl parts. Loath to part with her, the company produced comedies featuring all-teen casts. These comedies were popular because they were typical of children at that age.

When Vitagraph was casting Within the Law, they searched for an actress for the part of Aggie Lynch, a character on whom all the comedy relief of the film was dependent. DeGarde received the part, and press critics had nothing but lavish praise for her performance as Lynch and pronounced it "a huge success".

In 1939, she attended an Old Home Week at Ohrbach's in New York with other movie actors such as Mae Murray and June Elvidge.

== Reviews for Within the Law ==
- Variety: "Adele DeGarde as Aggie Lynch, which in reality is nothing more than a comedy foil for the lead, had something on the star, judging from the impression she left on the minds of the audience."
- Moving Picture World: "Adele DeGarde as Aggie Lynch must be credited with one of the best performances in the picture. In a character easy to overplay she strikes just the right note, and her amusing unmorality [sic] is always without offense."

== Filmography ==
- The Christmas Burglars (1908)
- One Touch of Nature (1909)
- The Golden Louis (1909)
- The Roue's Heart (1909)
- The Salvation Army Lass (1909)
- The Lure of the Gown (1909)
- The Terrible Quarrel (1909)
- The Voice of the Violin (1909)
- The Deception (1909)
- And a Little Child Shall Lead Them (1909)
- A Burglar's Mistake (1909)
- The Medicine Bottle (1909)
- A Drunkard's Reformation (1909)
- Twin Brothers (1909)
- Tis an Ill Wind That Blows No Good (1909)
- What Drink Did (1909)
- The Lonely Villa (1909)
- The Country Doctor (1909)
- The Children's Friend (1909)
- A Fair Exchange (1909)
- Leather Stocking (1909)
- Wanted, a Child (1909)
- Pippa Passes; or, The Song of Conscience (1909)
- What's Your Hurry? (1909)
- The Open Gate (1909)
- In the Window Recess (1909)
- The Death Disc: A Story of the Cromwellian Period (1909)
- Through the Breakers (1909)
- In a Hempen Bag (1909)
- In Little Italy (1909)
- The Rocky Road (1910)
- The Last Deal (1910)
- One Night and Then (1910)
- Over the Garden Wall (1910)
- A Life for a Life (1910)
- The Adventures of Dolly and Jim
- Little Angels of Luck (1910)
- A Mohawk's Way (1910)
- In Life's Cycle (1910)
- Examination Day at School (1910)
- The Iconoclast (1910)
- The Children's Revolt (1910)
- Jean Goes Fishing (1910)
- A Tin-Type Romance (1910)
- Jean and the Waif (1910)
- His Trust (1911)
- His Trust Fulfilled (1911)
- Society and the Man (1911)
- St. Valentine's Day in Greenaway Land (1911)
- Teaching Dad to Like Her (1911)
- Billy's Valentine (1911)
- The Derelict Reporter (1911)
- The Children of Social Favorites (1911)
- Sunshine and Shadow (1911)
- Barriers Burned Away (1911)
- A Geranium (1911)
- The Long Skirt (1911)
- Cherry Blossoms (1911)
- The Child Crusoes (1911)
- An Answered Prayer (1911)
- Carr's Regeneration (1911)
- By Way of Mrs. Browning (1911)
- The Trail of Books (1911)
- Suffer Little Children (1911)
- The Miser's Heart (1911)
- The Voiceless Message (1911)
- Saving the Special (1911)
- The Voice of the Child (1911)
- A Doubly Desired Orphan (1911)
- The Chocolate Revolver (1912)
- The Five Senses (1912)
- The Black Wall (1912)
- The Old Silver Watch (1912)
- The Governor Who Had a Heart (1912)
- The Old Kent Road (1912)
- The Man Under the Bed (1912)
- The Light that Failed (1912)
- Ingenuity (1912)
- Vultures and Doves (1912)
- The Mills of the Gods (1912)
- Three Girls and a Man (1912)
- The Eavesdropper (1912)
- Thou Shalt Not Kill (1913)
- When Bobby Forgot (1913)
- A Birthday Gift (1913)
- Dick, the Dead Shot (1913)
- The Only Veteran in Town (1913)
- The Widower's Quest (1913)
- The Lion's Bride (1913)
- Buddy's Downfall (1914)
- Buddy's First Call (1914)
- Mr. Barnes of New York (1914)
- A Pillar of Flame (1915)
- Insuring Cutey (1915)
- Rags and the Girl (1915)
- The Ruling Power (1915)
- Saints and Sinners (1915)
- Green Stockings (1916)
- Tubby Turns the Tables (1916)
- Myrtle the Manicurist (1916)
- Lights of New York (1916)
- Help! Help! Help! (1916)
- Whistling Dick's Christmas Stocking (1917)
- Within the Law (1917)
- The Love Doctor (1917)
- The Bottom of the Well (1917)
- The Purple Dress (1918)
- The Rathskeller and the Rose (1918)
- The Triumph of the Weak (1918)
- The Enchanted Profile (1918)

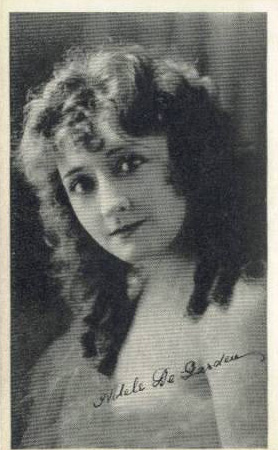
Adele DeGarde (1917)
