= Francis Boggs =

American film actor and director (1870–1911)

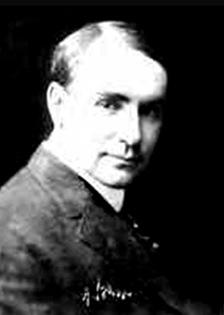
- Born: Francis Winter Boggs; March 1870; Santa Rosa, California, U.S.
- Died: October 27, 1911 (aged 41); Los Angeles, California, U.S.
- Burial place: Graceland Cemetery
- Occupation: Film director
- Years active: 1907–1911

Francis Winter Boggs (March 1870 – October 27, 1911) was an American stage actor and pioneer silent film director. He was one of the first to direct a film in Hollywood.

== Early life ==
He was born in Santa Rosa, California, to George W. Boggs and Alabama McMeans, the second of five children.

== Career ==
While still a teenager, he began acting with the Alcazar stock company in San Francisco and toured the American Southwest. In 1900, he moved to Los Angeles, but in 1902, he moved to Chicago, where he continued to work in theatre.

In Chicago, he met William Nicholas Selig and, in 1907, began producing films as an actor-director for Selig Polyscope Company. One of his earliest films, Monte Cristo (1908), starred Hobart Bosworth. He completed the interior shots at the Chicago studio but shot the scenes of Edmond Dantès emerging from the sea at the beach near Los Angeles. It was the first film filmed in Southern California.

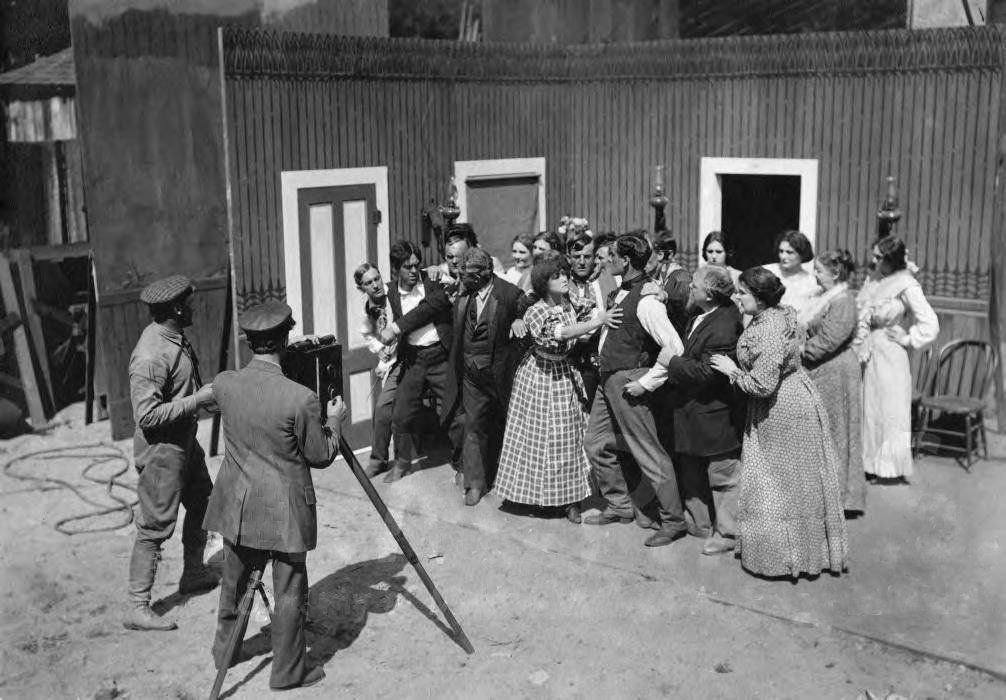
Francis Boggs, with his back to the camera, directs a scene for The Girls of the Range, 1910

In 1908, he made The Fairylogue and Radio-Plays, which had its writer, L. Frank Baum, present a slide show and films as a live travelogue presentation of his Oz story.

Boggs then set up a makeshift stage on a vacant lot in Downtown Los Angeles and produced In the Sultan's Power (1909) and The Heart of a Race Tout (1909), the first films made entirely in California.

Boggs later returned to Los Angeles and rented a small bungalow in the Edendale district as a permanent base from which he operated a West Coast satellite studio for Selig. Other East Coast studios soon began filming on the West Coast to take advantage of its moderate climate. Among people Boggs worked with in the film industry were Robert Z. Leonard, Art Acord, Betty Harte, Bessie Eyton, and Bebe Daniels.

The Sergeant, produced and directed by Boggs and written by and starring Bosworth, was released in September 1910. He also gave Roscoe "Fatty" Arbuckle his first movie work in 1909's Ben's Kid, and made four short films with him.

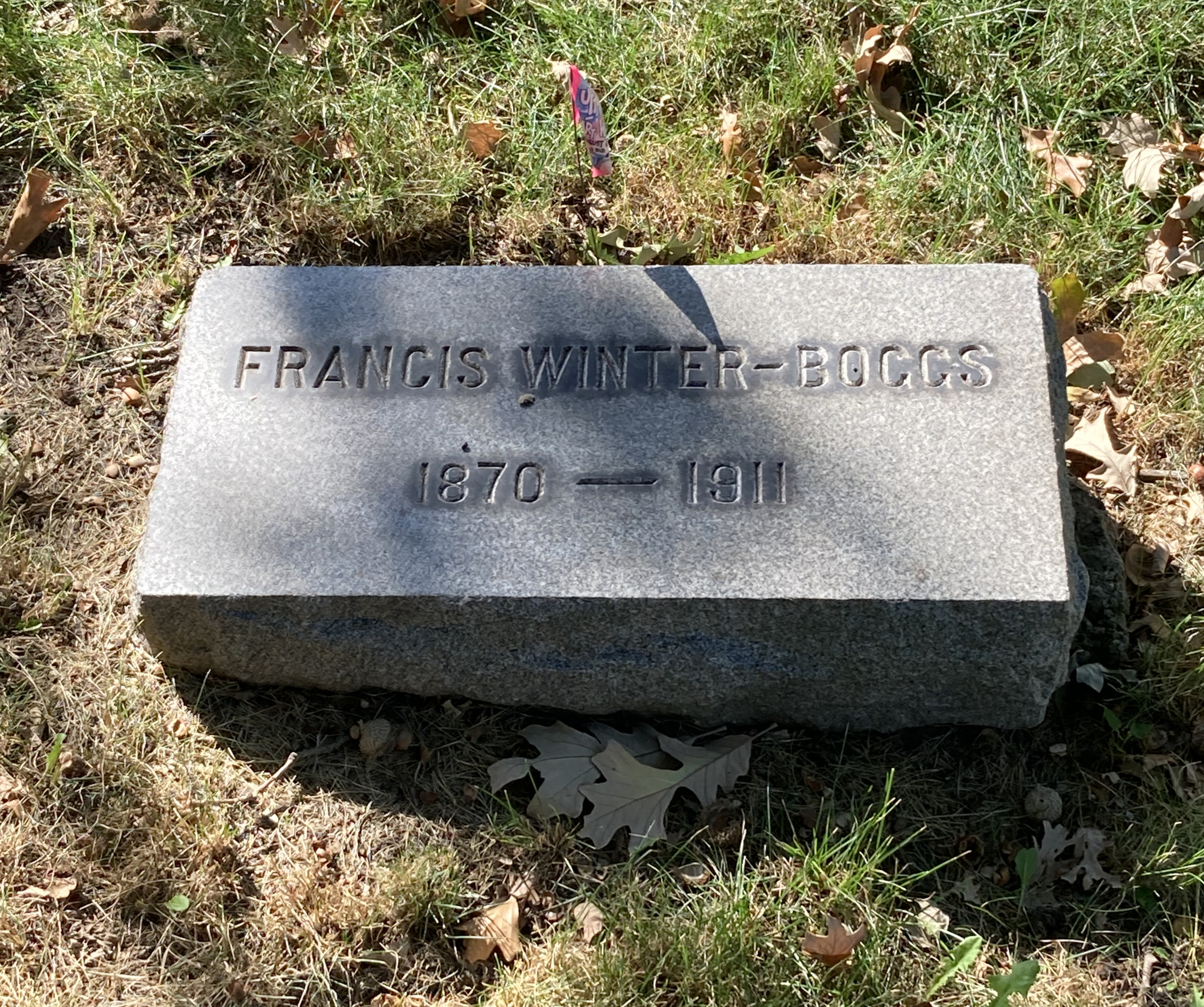
Boggs' grave at Graceland Cemetery

== Personal life ==
Boggs married Lillian Hayward on June 8, 1895; they later divorced in 1904. He often worked acting gigs with his wife, who went by the stage name of May Hosmer.

Boggs was shot to death by Frank Minnimatsu on October 27, 1911, aged 38 years old. Minnimatsu had previously been an employee of Boggs—compensated half the wages of the lowest-paid white person—and physically abused by Boggs. Minnimatsu opened fire with a revolver at Boggs while he was holding a business conference for the production of a new pantomime play. Minnimatsu, a Japanese caretaker and janitor, had been fired five months prior to the shooting for firing shots into a gasoline tank in a garage while drunk; he consequently became violently deranged.

== Legacy ==
His film The Sergeant was part of a group of seventy-five early American films found in New Zealand in 2010; the film was preserved by the Academy Film Archive in 2012.
