= Mack Sennett filmography =

Filmography

Mack Sennett was a Canadian-born American film director, producer and actor. This is an incomplete (at the time) list of films with Sennett acting, producing and directing. Most of his films still survive. According to the Internet Movie Database, he wrote for 95, directed 311, acted in 360 and produced 1,115 films between 1908 and 1956.

== 1906 ==
1. Getting Evidence (actor, uncredited)

== 1908 ==
In this year, Sennett appeared in 44 films with both small and significant acting parts.

2. Old Isaacs, the Pawnbroker (actor)
3. The King's Messenger (actor)
4. The Sculptor's Nightmare (extra)
5. Thompson's Night Out (actor)
6. The Invisible Fluid (actor)
7. The Man in the Box (actor)
8. Over the Hills to the Poor House (actor)
9. The Kentuckian (actor)
10. The Stage Rustler (actor)
11. The Black Viper (actor)
12. Deceived Slumming Party (actor)
13. The Fatal Hour (actor)
14. Balked at the Altar (actor)
15. Betrayed by a Handprint (actor)
16. Monday Morning in a Coney Island Police Court (actor and writer)
17. The Girl and the Outlaw (actor)
18. Behind the Scenes (actor)
19. The Red Girl (actor)
20. The Heart of O'Yama (actor)
21. Where the Breakers Roar (actor)
22. A Smoked Husband (actor)
23. The Devil (actor)
24. The Zulu's Heart (actor)
25. Father Gets in the Game (actor)
26. Ingomar, the Barbarian (actor)
27. The Vaquero's Vow (actor)
28. Romance of a Jewess (actor)
29. The Call of the Wild (actor)
30. Concealing a Burglar (actor)
31. After Many Years (actor)
32. The Pirate's Gold (actor)
33. The Taming of the Shrew (actor)
34. The Guerrilla (actor)
35. The Song of the Shirt (actor)
36. The Clubman and the Tramp (actor)
37. Money Mad (actor)
38. The Valet's Wife (actor)
39. The Feud and the Turkey (actor)
40. The Reckoning (actor)
41. The Test of Friendship (actor)
42. An Awful Moment (actor)
43. The Christmas Burglars (actor)
44. Mr. Jones at the Ball (actor)
45. The Helping Hand (actor)

== 1909 ==
Sennett directed his first film this year with D. W. Griffith, The Curtain Pole, but was uncredited for his work. This year he appeared in 125 films.

46. The Heart of an Outlaw (actor)
47. One Touch of Nature (actor)
48. The Maniac Cook (actor)
49. Mrs. Jones Entertains (actor)
50. The Honor of Thieves (actor)
51. The Road to the Heart (actor)
52. Love Finds a Way (actor)
53. The Sacrifice (actor)
54. A Rural Elopement (actor)
55. The Criminal Hypnotist (actor)
56. The Fascinating Mrs. Francis (actor)
57. Mr. Jones Has a Card Party (actor)
58. Those Awful Hats (actor)
59. The Welcome Burglar (actor)
60. The Cord of Life (actor)
61. The Girls and Daddy (actor)
62. The Brahma Diamond (actor)
63. A Wreath in Time (actor)
64. Tragic Love (actor)
65. The Curtain Pole (actor)
66. The Joneses Have Amateur Theatricals (actor)
67. The Politician's Love Story (actor)
68. The Golden Louis (actor)
69. At the Altar (actor)
70. The Prussian Spy (actor)
71. His Wife's Mother (actor)
72. A Fool's Revenge (actor)
73. The Wooden Leg (actor)
74. The Roue's Heart (actor)
75. The Salvation Army Lass (actor)
76. The Lure of the Gown (actor)
77. The Voice of the Violin (actor)
78. The Deception (actor)
79. And a Little Child Shall Lead Them (actor)
80. A Burglar's Mistake (actor)
81. The Medicine Bottle (actor)
82. Jones and His New Neighbors (actor)
83. A Drunkard's Reformation (actor)
84. Trying to Get Arrested (actor and writer)
85. The Road to the Heart (actor)
86. Schneider's Anti-Noise Crusade (actor)
87. A Rude Hostess (actor)
88. The Winning Coat (actor)
89. A Sound Sleeper (actor)
90. Confidence (actor)
91. Lady Helen's Escapade (actor)
92. A Troublesome Satchel (actor)
93. Brothers (actor)
94. Lucky Jim (actor)
95. Tis an Ill Wind That Blows No Good (actor)
96. The Suicide Club (actor)
97. The Note in the Shoe (actor)
98. One Busy Hour (actor)
99. The French Duel (actor)
100. Jones and the Lady Book Agent (actor)
101. A Baby's Shoe (actor)
102. The Jilt (actor)
103. Resurrection (actor)
104. Two Memories (actor)
105. Eloping with Auntie (actor)
106. The Cricket on the Hearth (actor)
107. What Drink Did (actor)
108. The Violin Maker of Cremona (actor)
109. The Lonely Villa (actor and writer)
110. A New Trick (actor)
111. The Son's Return (actor)
112. The Faded Lilies (actor)
113. Her First Biscuits (actor)
114. Was Justice Served? (actor)
115. The Peachbasket Hat (actor)
116. The Mexican Sweethearts (actor)
117. The Way of Man (actor)
118. The Necklace (actor)
119. The Message (actor)
120. The Cardinal's Conspiracy (actor)
121. Jealousy and the Man (actor)
122. A Convict's Sacrifice (actor)
123. The Slave (actor)
124. A Strange Meeting (actor)
125. The Mended Lute (actor)
126. They Would Elope (actor)
127. Mr. Jones' Burglar (actor)
128. The Better Way (actor)
129. With Her Card (actor)
130. Mrs. Jones' Lover (I Want My Hat) (actor)
131. His Wife's Visitor (actor)
132. The Indian Runner's Romance (actor)
133. The Seventh Day (actor)
134. Oh, Uncle! (actor)
135. The Mills of the Gods (actor)
136. The Sealed Room (actor)
137. The Little Darling (actor)
138. The Hessian Renegades (actor)
139. Getting Even (actor)
140. The Broken Locket (actor)
141. In Old Kentucky (actor)
142. A Fair Exchange (actor)
143. The Awakening (actor)
144. Pippa Passes; or, The Song of Conscience (actor, first film to be reviewed by New York Times)
145. The Little Teacher (actor)
146. A Change of Heart (actor)
147. His Lost Love (actor)
148. The Expiation (actor)
149. In the Watches of the Night (actor)
150. Lines of White on a Sullen Sea (actor)
151. What's Your Hurry? (actor)
152. The Gibson Goddess (actor)
153. Nursing a Viper (actor)
154. The Light That Came (actor)
155. Two Women and a Man (actor)
156. A Midnight Avenue (actor)
157. The Open Gate (actor)
158. The Mountaineer's Honor (actor)
159. The Trick That Failed (actor)
160. In the Window Recess (actor)
161. The Death Disc: A Story of the Cromwellian Period (actor)
162. Through the Breakers (actor)
163. The Red Man's View (actor)
164. A Corner in Wheat (actor)
165. In a Hempen Bag (actor)
166. A Trap for Santa Claus (uncredited)
167. In Little Italy (actor)
168. To Save Her Soul (actor)
169. The Day After (actor)
170. Choosing a Husband (actor)

== 1910 ==
This year Sennett was in 70 films.

171. The Dancing Girl of Butte (actor)
172. All on Account of the Milk (actor)
173. The Call (actor)
174. The Last Deal (actor)
175. The Cloister's Touch (actor)
176. The Woman from Mellon's (actor)
177. One Night and Then (actor)
178. The Englishman and the Girl (actor)
179. Taming a Husband (actor)
180. The Newlyweds (actor)
181. The Thread of Destiny (actor)
182. In Old California (actor)
183. The Converts (actor)
184. The Love of Lady Irma (actor)
185. Faithful (actor)
186. The Twisted Trail (actor)
187. Gold Is Not All (actor)
188. The Two Brothers (actor)
189. As It Is in Life (actor)
190. A Rich Revenge (actor)
191. The Way of the World (actor)
192. Up a Tree (1910, actor)
193. The Gold Seekers (actor)
194. Love Among the Roses (1910, actor)
195. Over Silent Paths (1910, actor)
196. An Affair of Hearts (1910, actor)
197. Ramona (1910, actor)
198. A Knot in the Plot (1910, actor)
199. In the Season of Buds (1910, actor)
200. The Purgation (1910, actor)
201. A Victim of Jealousy (1910, actor)
202. In the Border States (1910, actor)
203. The Face at the Window (1910, actor)
204. Never Again (1910, actor)
205. The Marked Time-Table (1910, actor)
206. A Child's Impulse (1910, actor)
207. A Midnight Cupid (1910, actor)
208. What the Daisy Said (1910, actor)
209. A Child's Faith (1910, actor)
210. A Flash of Light (1910, actor)
211. Serious Sixteen (1910, actor)
212. As the Bells Rang Out! (1910, actor)
213. The Call to Arms (1910, actor)
214. An Arcadian Maid (1910, actor)
215. Her Father's Pride (1910, actor)
216. A Salutary Lesson (1910, actor)
217. The Usurer (1910, actor)
218. When We Were in Our Teens (1910, actor)
219. Wilful Peggy (1910, actor)
220. The Modern Prodigal (1910, actor)
221. The Affair of an Egg (1910, actor)
222. Muggsy Becomes a Hero (1910, actor)
223. Little Angels of Luck (1910, actor)
224. A Mohawk's Way (1910, actor)
225. A Summer Tragedy (1910, actor)
226. Examination Day at School (1910, actor)
227. The Iconoclast (1910, actor)
228. A Gold Necklace (1910, actor)
229. The Masher (1910, actor)
230. The Lucky Toothache (1910, actor and writer)
231. The Broken Doll (1910, actor)
232. The Passing of a Grouch (1910, actor)
233. Love in Quarantine (1910, actor)
234. The Song of the Wildwood Flute (1910, actor)
235. Not So Bad as It Seemed (1910, actor)
236. Effecting a Cure (1910, actor, writer and director)
237. Happy Jack, a Hero (1910, actor)
238. His Wife's Sweetheart (1910, actor)
239. After the Ball (1910, actor)

== 1911 ==
In this year, Sennett did more directing, but still starred in films. He was involved in 59 films this year.

241. The Italian Barber (1911, actor)
242. His Trust 1911, actor)
243. His Trust Fulfilled (1911, actor)
244. Three Sisters (1911, actor)
245. Priscilla's Engagement Ring (1911, actor)
246. Fisher Folks (1911, actor)
247. His Daughter (1911, actor)
248. A Decree of Destiny (1911, actor)
249. Comrades (1911, actor, writer and director)
250. Cured (1911, actor)
251. The Spanish Gypsy (1911, actor)
252. Paradise Lost (1911, actor and director)
253. Misplaced Jealousy (1911, actor, writer and director)
254. Cupid's Joke (1911, actor and director)
255. The Country Lovers (1911, actor)
256. The New Dress (1911, actor)
257. The Manicure Lady (1911, actor and director)
258. The White Rose of the Wilds (1911, actor)
259. Dutch Gold Mine (1911, actor and director)
260. Bearded Youth (1911, actor and director)
261. The Ghost (1911, actor)
262. The Beautiful Voice (1911, actor and director)
263. Mr. Peck Goes Calling (1911, actor and director)
264. That Dare Devil (1911, actor and director)
265. The $500 Reward (1911, actor and director, Early Sherlock Holmes film, Sennett plays Sherlock.)
266. The Village Hero (1911, actor and director)
267. Too Many Burglars (1911, actor and director)
268. Mr. Bragg, a Fugitive (1911, actor and director)
269. Trailing the Counterfeiter (1911, actor and director)
270. Through His Wife's Picture (1911, actor and director)
271. The Inventor's Secret (1911, actor and director)
272. Their First Divorce Case (1911, actor and director)
273. Caught with the Goods (1911, actor and director)
274. Priscilla and the Umbrella (1911, director)
275. Curiosity (1911, director)
276. Their Fates 'Sealed' (1911, director)
277. Dave's Love Affair (1911, director)
278. The Delayed Proposal (1911, director)
279. The Wonderful Eye (1911, director)
280. Stubbs' New Servants (1911, director)
281. Jinks Joins the Temperance Club (1911, director)
282. An Interrupted Game (1911, director)
283. The Diving Girl (1911, director)
284. The Villain Foiled (1911, director)
285. The Baron (1911, director)
286. The Lucky Horseshoe (1911, director)
287. When Wifey Holds the Purse Strings (1911, director)
288. A Convenient Burglar (1911, director and writer)
289. Josh's Suicide (1911, director)
290. A Victim of Circumstances (1911, director)
291. Won Through a Medium (1911, director)
292. Dooley's Scheme (1911, director)
293. Resourceful Lovers (1911, director)
294. Her Mother Interferes (1911, director)
295. Why He Gave Up (1911, director and supervisor producer)
296. Abe Gets Even with Father (1911, director)
297. Taking His Medicine (1911, director)
298. Her Pet (1911, director)
299. A Mix-up in Raincoats (1911, director)

== 1912 ==
Sennett was involved in 83 films this year.

300. Did Mother Get Her Wish? (actor and director)
301. The Fatal Chocolate (actor and director)
302. A Message from the Moon (actor and director)
303. A String of Pearls (actor)
304. A Spanish Dilemma (actor and director)
305. Hot Stuff (actor and director)
306. These Hicksville Boys (actor and director)
307. Their First Kidnapping Case (actor and director)
308. The Brave Hunter (actor and director)
309. The Furs (actor and director)
310. Helen's Marriage (actor and director)
311. Tomboy Bessie (actor and director)
312. The New Baby (actor and director)
313. Man's Genesis (actor uncredited)
314. The Speed Demon (actor and director)
315. The Would-Be Shriner (actor and director)
316. What the Doctor Ordered (actor and director)
317. The Tourist (unconfirmed whether he was in the picture, director and producer)
318. The Water Nymph (actor, director and producer)
319. Cohen Collects a Debt (actor, director and producer)
320. The New Neighbor (actor, director and producer)
321. Riley and Schultz (actor, director and producer)
322. Pedro's Dilemma (actor, director and producer)
323. The Flirting Husband (actor, director and producer)
324. Ambitious Butler (actor, director and producer)
325. At Coney Island (actor, director and producer)
326. At it Again (actor, director and producer)
327. The Deacon's Troubles (actor, director and producer)
328. A Temperamental Husband (actor, director and producer)
329. The Rivals (actor, director and producer)
330. Mr. Fix-It (actor, director and producer)
331. A Bear Escape (actor, director and producer)
332. Pat's Day Off (actor, director and producer)
333. The New York Hat (actor)
334. A Family Mix Up (actor, director and producer)
335. Hoffmeyers Legacy (actor, director and producer)
336. The Duel (actor, director and producer)
337. Who Got the Reward (director)
338. The Joke on the Joker (director)
339. Brave and Bold (director)
340. With a Kodak (director)
341. Pants and Pansies (director)
342. Lily's Lover (director)
343. A Near Tragedy (director)
344. Got a Match (director)
345. Priscilla's Capture (director)
346. The Engagement Ring (director)
347. A Voice from the Deep (director)
348. Those Hickville Boys (director)
349. Oh, Those Eyes (director)
350. Help! Help! (director)
351. Won by a Fish (director)
352. The Leading Man (director)
353. The Fickle Spaniard (director)
354. When the Fire Bells Rang (director)
355. A Close Call (director)
356. Neighbors (director)
357. Katchem Kate (director)
358. The New Baby (director)
359. A Dash Through the Clouds (director)
360. Trying to Fool Uncle (director)
361. One Round O'Brien (director)
362. His Own Fault (director)
363. Stern Pappa (director)
364. He Must Have a Wife (director)
365. His Own Fault (director)
366. Willie Becomes an Artist (director)
367. The Would-Be Shriner (director)
368. Tragedy of the Dress Suit (director)
369. An Interrupted Elopement (director)
370. Through Dumb Luck (supervising director)
371. He Must Have a Wife (director)
372. The Beating He Needed (director and producer)
373. Stolen Glory (director and producer)
374. The Grocery Clerk's Romance (director and producer)
375. Mabel's Lovers (director and producer)
376. A Desperate Lover (director and producer)
377. An Absent Minded Burglar (unconfirmed whether directed by Sennett)
378. A Midnight Elopement (director and producer)
379. Useful Sheep (unconfirmed whether directed by Sennett)
380. Mabel's Adventures (director and producer)
381. The Drummer's Vacation (director and producer)
382. Mabel's Stratagem (director and producer)

== 1913 ==
383. How Hiram Won Out (actor, director and producer)
384. The Mistaken Masher (actor, director and producer)
385. The Elite Ball (actor, director and producer)
386. The Battle of Who Run (actor, director and producer)
387. The Stolen Purse (actor, director and producer)
388. The Jealous Waiter (actor, director and producer)
389. Mabel's Heroes (actor, director and producer)
390. A Landlord's Troubles (actor, director and producer)
391. The Sleuth's Last Stand (actor, director and producer)
392. The Sleuth's Floral Parade (actor, director and producer)
393. A Strong Revenge (actor, director and producer)
394. The Rube and the Baron (actor, director and producer)
395. At Twelve O'Clock (actor, director and producer)
396. Her New Beau (actor and producer)
397. Those Good Old Days (actor, director and producer)
398. Murphy's I.O.U. (actor and producer)
399. His Ups and Downs (director and producer, unconfirmed if he was an actor in film)
400. Mabel's Awful Mistakes (actor, director and producer)
401. Their First Exucition (actor, director and producer)
402. Barney Oldfield's Race for a Life (actor, director, producer)
403. The Hansome Driver (actor, director and producer)
404. Peeping Pete (actor, director and producer)
405. His Crooked Career (actor, director and producer)
406. Rastus and the Game Cock (actor, director and producer)
407. The Firebugs (actor, director and producer)
408. Mabel's Dramatic Career (actor, director and producer)
409. A Healthy Neighborhood (actor, director and producer)
410. Love Sickness at Sea (actor, director, producer)
411. Saving Mabel's Dad (director and producer)
412. A Double Wedding (director and producer)
413. The Cure that Failed (director and producer)
414. Sir Thomas Lipton Out West (director and producer)
415. For Lizzie's Sake (director and producer)
416. The Deacon Outwitted (director and producer)
417. Just Brown's Luck (director and producer)
418. Her Birthday Present (director and producer)
419. Heinz's Resurrection (director and producer)
420. Forced Bravery (director and producer)
421. The Professor's Daughter (director and producer)
422. A Tangled Affair (director and producer)
423. A Red Hot Romance (director and producer)
424. A Doctored Affair (director and producer)
425. The Rural Third Degree (director and producer)
426. The Man Next Door (director and producer)
427. A Wife Wanted (director and producer)
428. The Chief's Predicament (director and producer)
429. Jenny's Pearls (director and producer)
430. On His Wedding Day (director and producer)
431. Hide and Seek (director and producer)
432. A Game of Poker (director and producer)
433. A Life in the Balance (director and producer)
434. A Fishy Affair (director and producer)
435. The New Conductor (director and producer)
436. His Chum the Baron (director and producer)
437. That Ragtime Band (director and producer)
438. A Little Hero (director and producer)
439. Hubby's Job (director and producer)
440. The Foreman of the Jury (director and producer)
441. Feeding Time (director)
442. The Speed Queen (director and producer)
443. The Waiter's Picnic (director and producer)
444. A Bandit (director and producer)
445. The Largest Boat Ever Launched Sideways (director and producer)
446. Safe in Jail (director and producer)
447. The Telltale Light (director and producer)
448. A Noise from the Deep (director and producer)
449. The Riot (director and producer)
450. Mabel's New Hero (director and producer)
451. The Gypsy Queen (director and producer)
452. The Fatal Taxicab (director and producer)
453. What Dreams Come True (director and producer)
454. The Bowling Match (director and producer)
455. Schnitz the Tailor (director and producer)
456. The Making of an Automobile Tyre (director and producer)
457. A Muddy Romance (director and producer)
458. Cohen Saves the Flag (director and producer)
459. The San Francisco Celebration (director and producer)
460. The Gusher (director and producer)
461. A Bad Game (director and producer)
462. Zuzu the Bandleader (director and producer)
463. Some Nerve (director and producer)
464. The Champion (producer)
465. His Sister's Kids (producer)
466. Fatty's Flirtation (producer)
467. The Horse Thief (producer)
468. A Ride for a Bride (producer)
469. The Rogue's Gallery (producer)
470. The Woman Haters (producer)

== 1914–1930 ==
471. 1914
472. Mabel at the Wheel (aka Hot Finish) (director, producer, star actor)
473. The Fatal Mallet (actor, writer, director, producer)
474. Tillie's Punctured Romance (director, writer, producer)
475. Between Showers (producer)
476. Caught in a Cabaret (producer)
477. Cruel, Cruel Love (director, producer)
478. The Property Man (producer)
479. The Rounders (producer)
480. Those Love Pangs (producer)
481. Dough and Dynamite (writer, producer)
482. Laughing Gas (producer)
483. His New Profession (producer)
484. Kid Auto Races at Venice (producer)
485. The Knockout (producer)
486. The Tango Tangle (writer, director, producer)
487. 1915
488. Mabel's Wilful Way (producer)
489. Fickle Fatty's Fall (writer)
490. Fatty's New Role (producer)
491. Love, Loot and Crash (producer)
492. My Valet (director, writer, producer, star actor)
493. Miss Fatty's Seaside Lovers (producer)
494. 1916
495. The Worst of Friends (director)
496. Fatty and Mabel Adrift (supervisor)
497. 1917
498. A Shanghaied Jonah (director)
499. Two Crooks (director)
500. Skidding Hearts (supervisor, producer)
501. Teddy at the Throttle (producer)
502. An International Sneak (producer)
503. A Clever Dummy (director, writer, producer)
504. Are Waitresses Safe? (producer)
505. Cactus Nell (producer)
506. 1918
507. Two Tough Tenderfeet (producer, presenter)
508. 1919
509. Yankee Doodle in Berlin (writer, producer)
510. Hearts and Flowers (producer)
511. 1920
512. Tillie’s Love Affair (director)
513. Down on the Farm (producer)
514. 1921
515. Be Reasonable (executive producer)
516. Molly O (story, producer)
517. A Small Town Idol (producer)
518. By Heck (producer)
519. 1922
520. The Crossroads of New York (presenter, script, original story)
521. Oh, Mabel Behave (director)
522. Step Forward (producer)
523. 1923
524. Suzanna (producer)
525. The Dare-devil (producer, writer)
526. The Shriek of Araby (producer)
527. The Extra Girl (original story, producer)
528. 1924
529. Off His Trolley (director)
530. The Giddap (director)
531. Honeymoon Hardship (producer)
532. The Reel Virginian (producer)
533. His Marriage Wow (producer)
534. All Night Long (producer)
535. The Hollywood Kid (producer, himself)
536. Feet of Mud (producer)
537. Yukon Jake (presented by)
538. The First 100 Years (presented by)
539. The Hansom Cabman (producer)
540. His New Mamma (producer)
541. The Luck o' the Foolish (producer)
542. Picking Peaches (producer)
543. Shanghaied Lovers (producer)
544. 1925
545. Boobs in the Wood (producer)
546. Super-hooper-dyne Lizzies (producer)
547. Wandering Willies (producer)
548. Remember When? (producer)
549. Water Wagons (producer)
550. The Soapsuds Lady (producer)
551. 1926
552. Flirty Four-Flushers (producer)
553. Hoboken to Hollywood (producer)
554. A Small Town Princess (producer)
555. When a Man's a Prince (author of original work)
556. A Blonde's Revenge (producer)
557. The Divorce Dodger (producer)
558. Fight Night (producer)
559. A Harem Knight (producer)
560. Wide Open Faces (producer)
561. 1927
562. Love in a Police Station (director)
563. The Golf Nut (director)
564. His First Flame (presents)
565. Fiddlesticks (presents)
566. Crazy to Act (producer)
567. The Jolly Jilter (producer)
568. The Pride of Pikeville (producer)
569. 1928
570. The Good-Bye Kiss (director)
571. Smith's Restaurant (director)
572. Smith's Burglar (presents)
573. The Campus Vamp (producer)
574. The Lion's Roar
575. 1929
576. Marie's Millions (director)
577. The New Half Back (director)
578. The Lion's Roar (director)
579. Matchmaking Mamma (producer)
580. The Bees' Buzz (director)
581. 1930
582. Sugar Plum Papa (director)
583. Honeymoon Zeppelin (director)
584. Fat Wives for Thin (director)
585. Rough Idea of Love (director)
586. Scotch (director)
587. Goodbye Legs (director)
588. Grandma's Girl (director)
589. Campus Crushes
590. Divorced Sweethearts (director)
591. Midnight Daddies

== 1931 ==
575. The Albany Branch (short) (producer)
576. The All-American Kickback (Short) (producer)
577. A Poor Fish (short) (director, producer)
578. The Bride's Mistake (short) (producer)
579. The Cannonball (short) (producer)
580. The College Vamp (short) (producer)
581. The Cowcatcher's Daughter (short) (producer)
582. Crashing Hollywood (short) (producer)
583. Dance Hall Marge (short) (producer)
584. The Dog Doctor (short) (producer)
585. Dream House (producer)
586. Ex-Sweeties (short) (producer)
587. The Fainting Lover (short) (producer)
588. Ghost Parade (short) (producer)
589. The Great Pie Mystery (short) (producer)
590. Half Holiday (short) (producer)
591. Hold 'er Sheriff (short) (producer)
592. In Conference (short) (producer)
593. I Surrender Dear (director, producer)
594. Just a Bear (short) (producer)
595. Monkey Business in Africa (short) (producer)
596. Movie-Town (short) (producer)
597. No, No, Lady (short) (producer)
598. One More Chance (short) (director, producer)
599. One Yard to Go (short) (producer)
600. Poker Widows (short) (producer)
601. The Pottsville Palooka (short) (producer)
602. Slide, Speedy, Slide (short) (producer)
603. Speed (director, producer)
604. The Tamale Vendor (short) (producer)
605. Taxi Troubles (short) (producer)
606. Too Many Husbands (short) (producer)
607. The Trail of the Swordfish (short) (producer)
608. Wrestling Swordfish (documentary short) (producer)
609. Who's Who in the Zoo (short) (producer)
610. The World Flier (short) (producer)
611. Stars of Yesterday (archive footage)

== 1932 ==
612. Hypnotized (director)
613. The Dentist (all rights reserved by)
614. Playground of the Mammals (presentation by)
615. Billboard Girl (producer)

== 1933 ==
616. The Barber Shop (a Mack Sennett comedy)
617. The Pharmacist (all rights reserved by)
618. Sing, Bing, Sing
619. Blue of the Night

== 1935 ==
620. Flicker Fever (director)
621. Just Another Murder (director)
622. The Timid Young Man (director)
623. Way Up Thar (director)
624. Ye Old Saw Mill (director)

== 1939–1994 ==
625. 1939
626. Hollywood Cavalcade (supervisor of silent screen sequences, himself)
627. 1941
628. Love's Intrigue (director)
629. Meet the Stars No. 8: Stars Past and Present (on-screen participant)
630. Love's Intrigue (director)
631. 1947
632. The Road to Hollywood (director, from 1930s short films of Bing Crosby)
633. 1949
634. Down Memory Lane Producer (cast member)
635. 1954
636. Abbott and Costello Meet the Keystone Kops (cast member)
637. 1955
638. All in Good Fun (archive footage)
639. 1961
640. Days of Thrills and Laughter (cast member)
641. For Laughing Out Loud (cast member)
642. 1962
643. Tribute to Mack Sennett (cast member)
644. 1994
645. A Century of Cinema (interviewee)

== Gallery ==
Film posters (lobby cards), newspaper and magazine ads
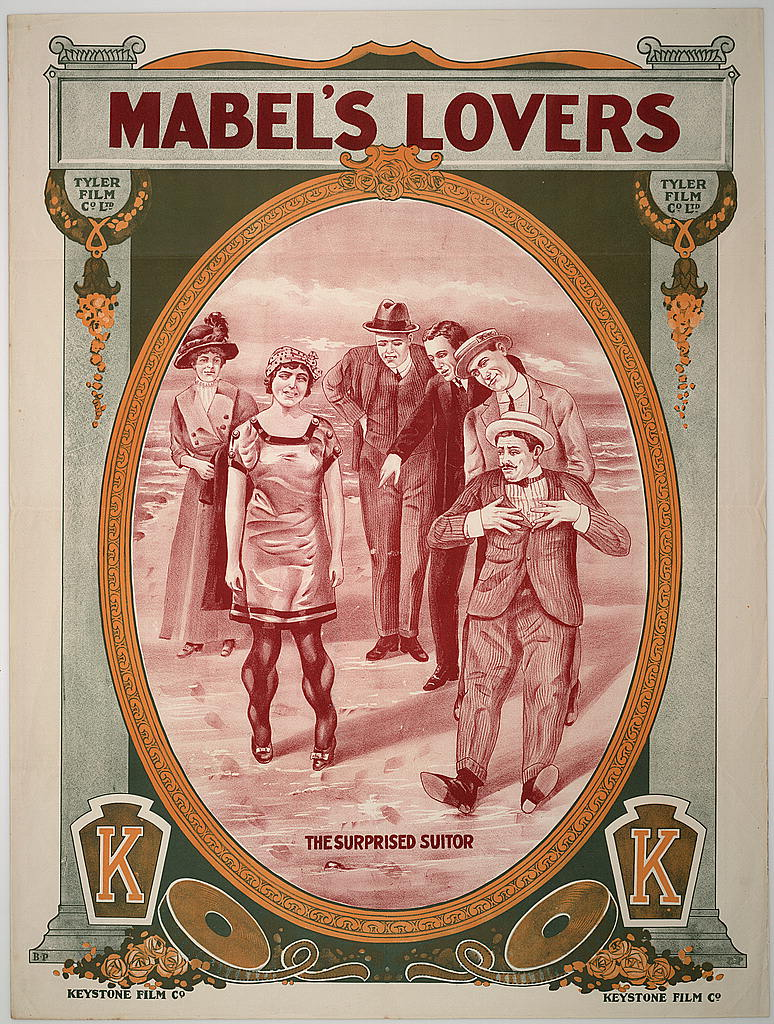
Mabel's Lovers (1912)

Between Showers (1914)

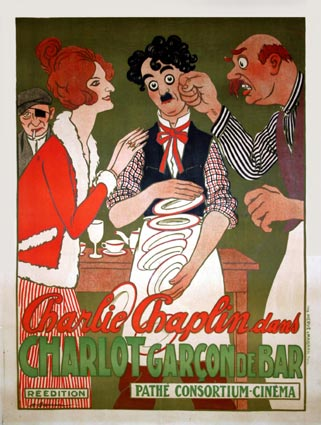
Caught in a Cabaret (1914)

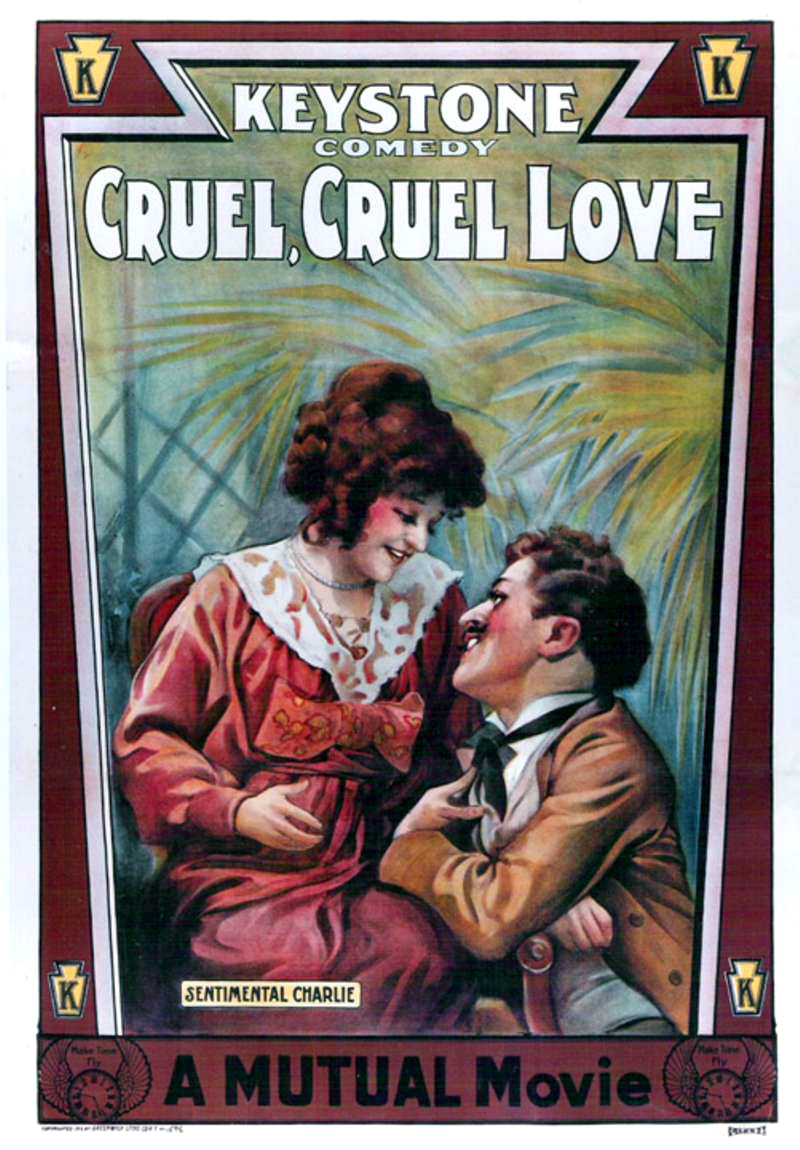
Cruel, Cruel Love (1914)

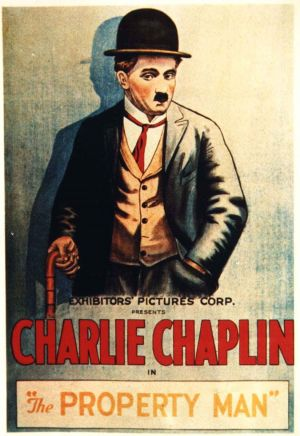
The Property Man (1914)

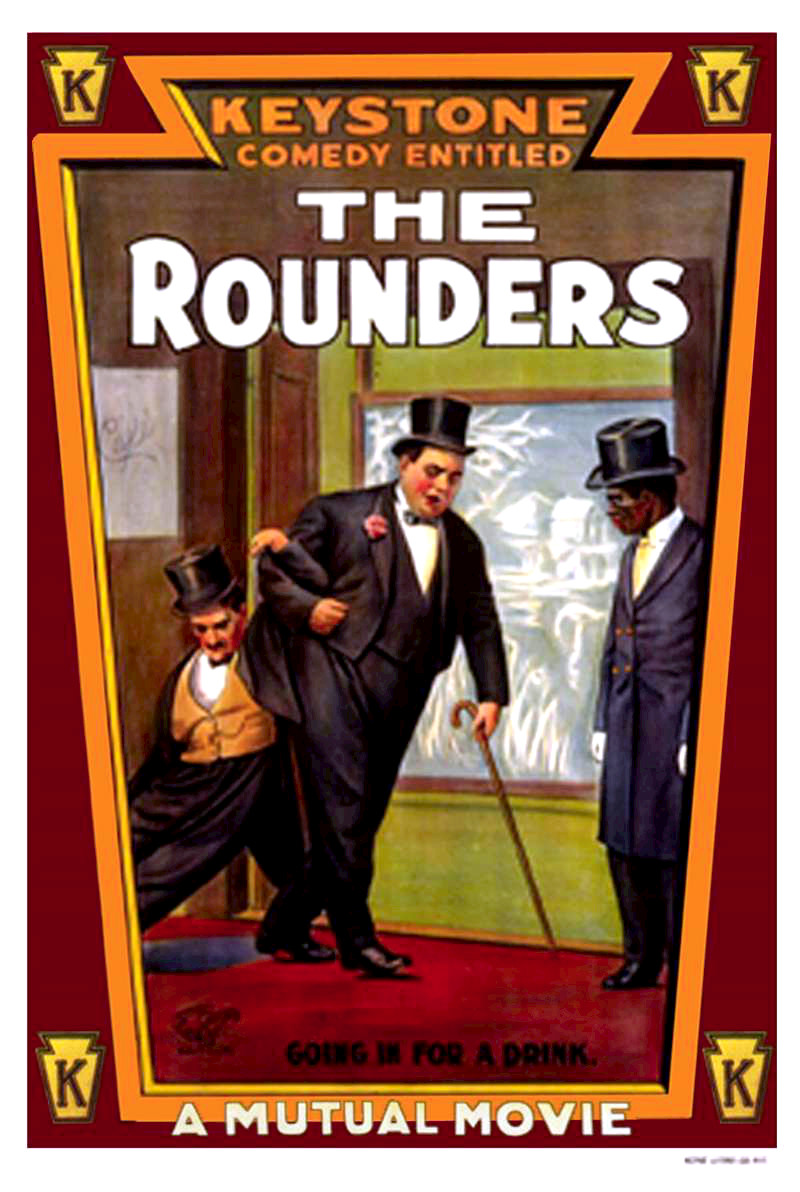
The Rounders (1914)

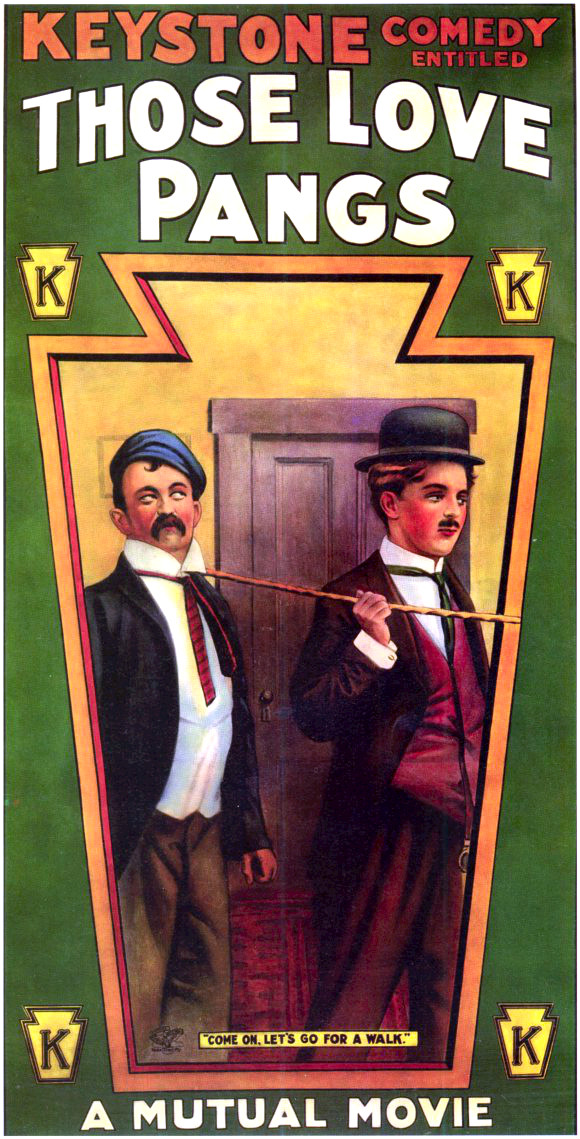
Those Love Pangs (1914)

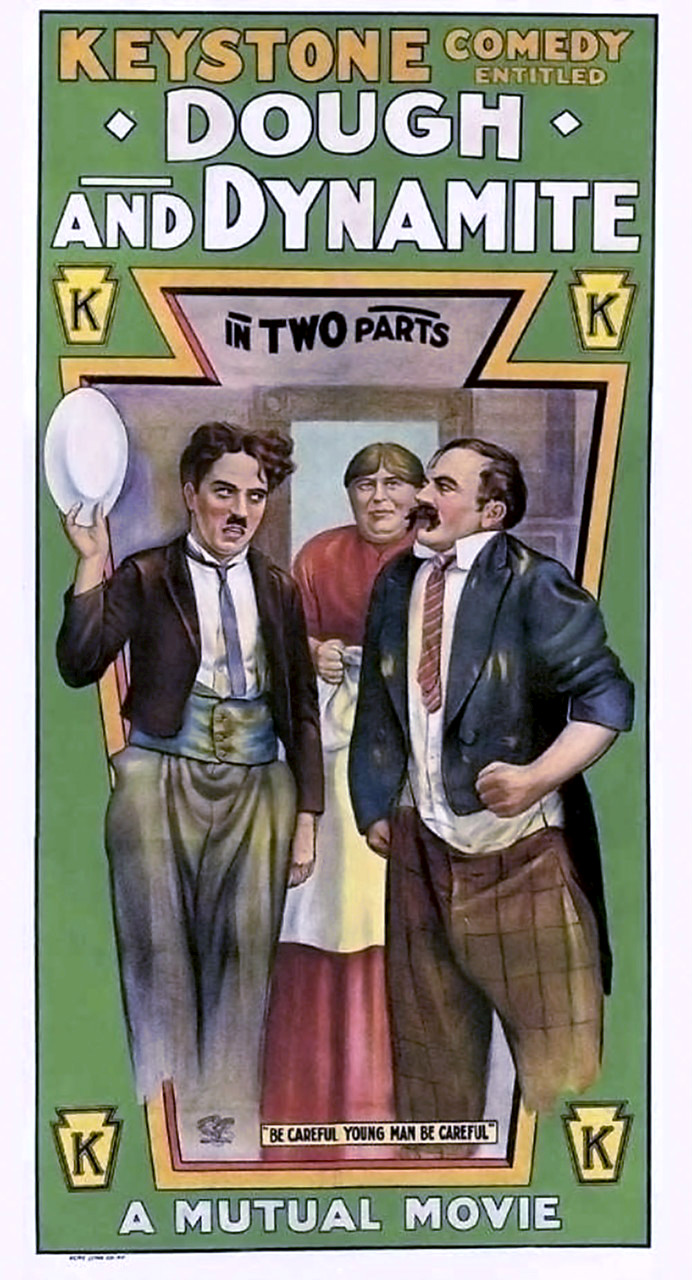
Dough and Dynamite (1914)

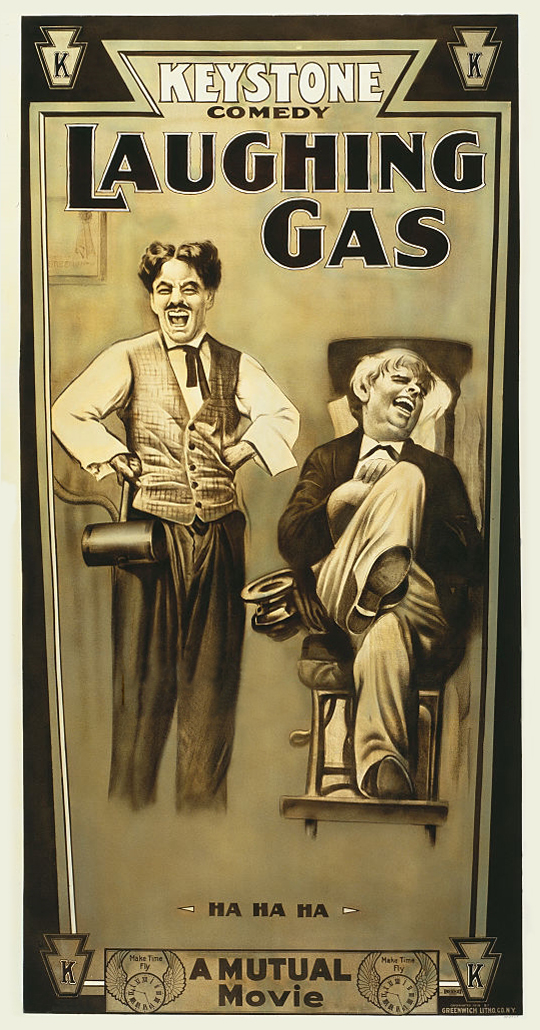
Laughing Gas (1914)

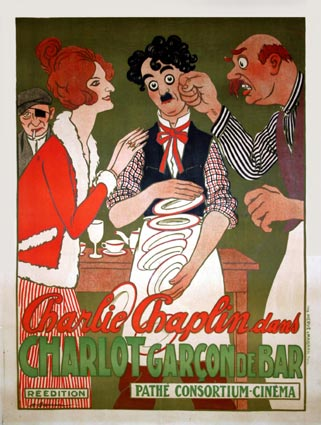
Charlot garçon de café (Caught in a Cabaret) (1914)

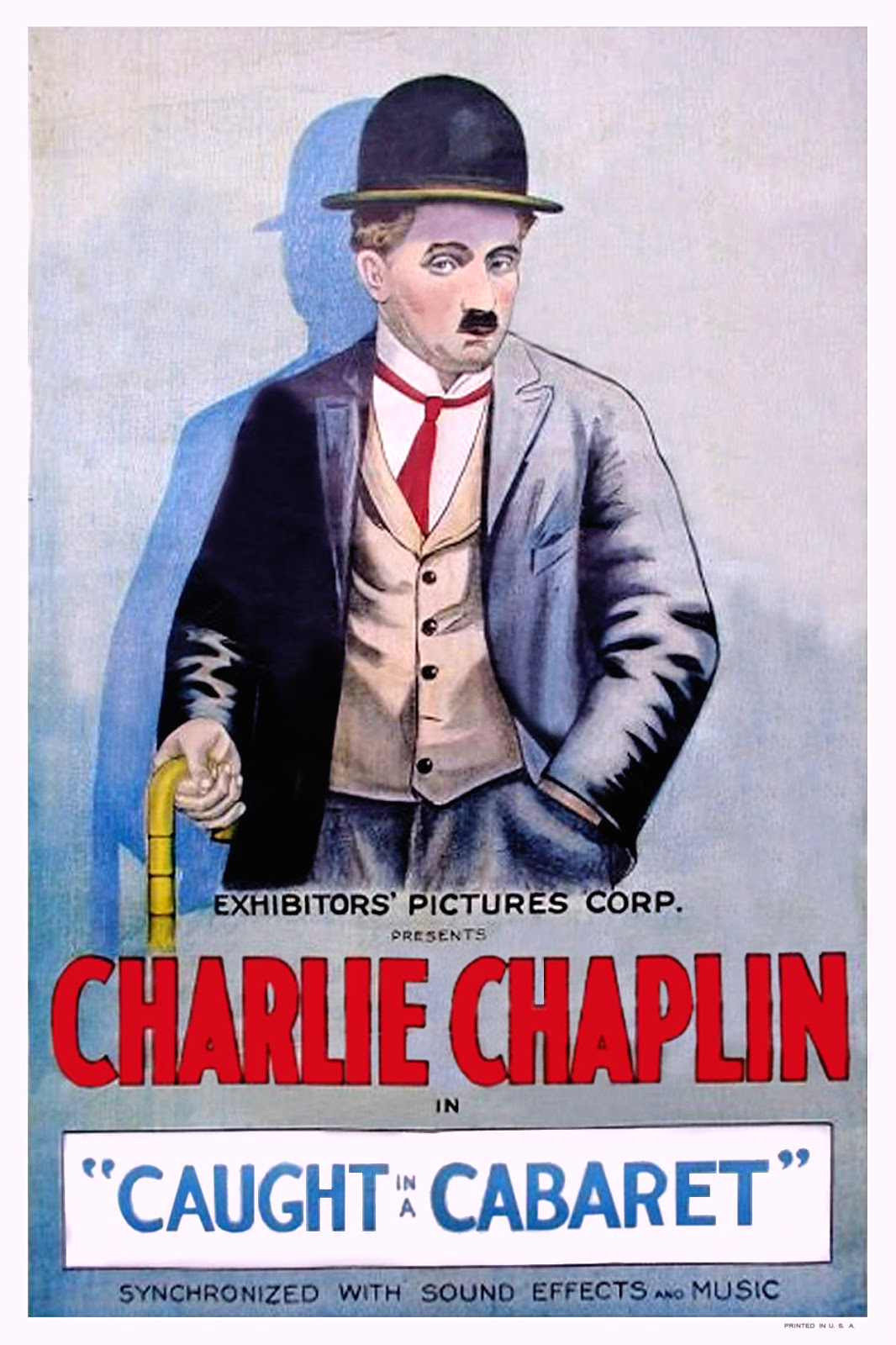
Caught in a Cabaret (1914)

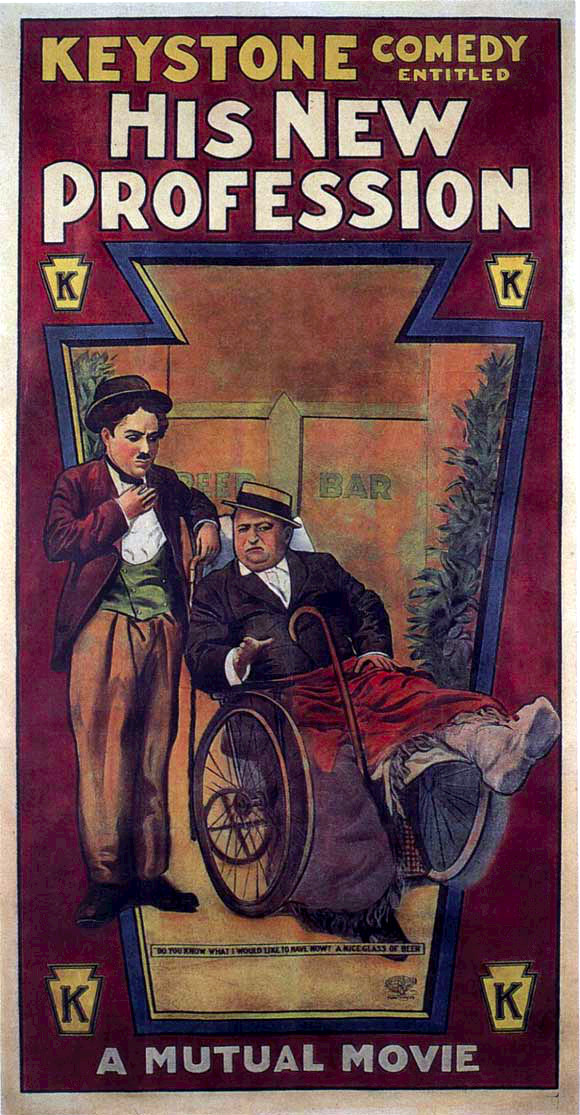
His New Profession (1914)

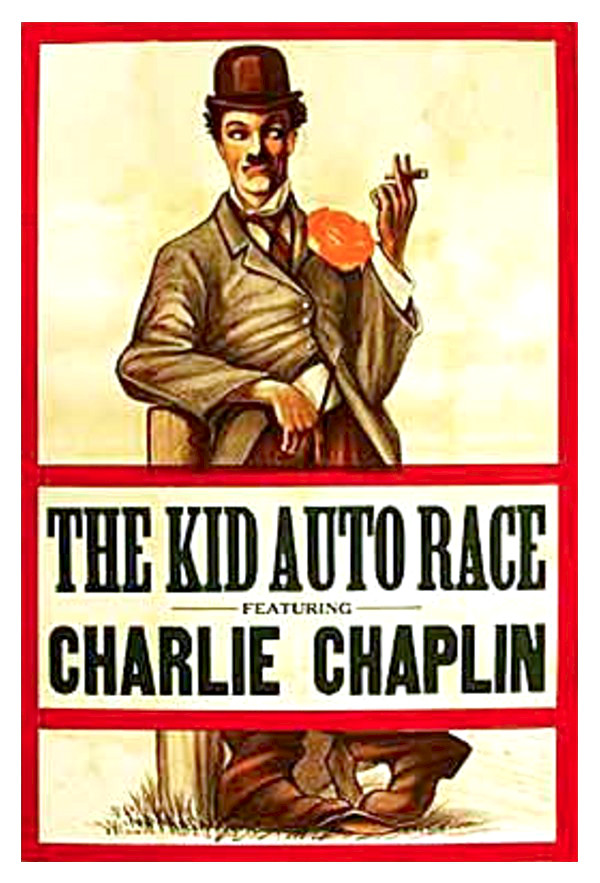
Kid Auto Races at Venice (1914)

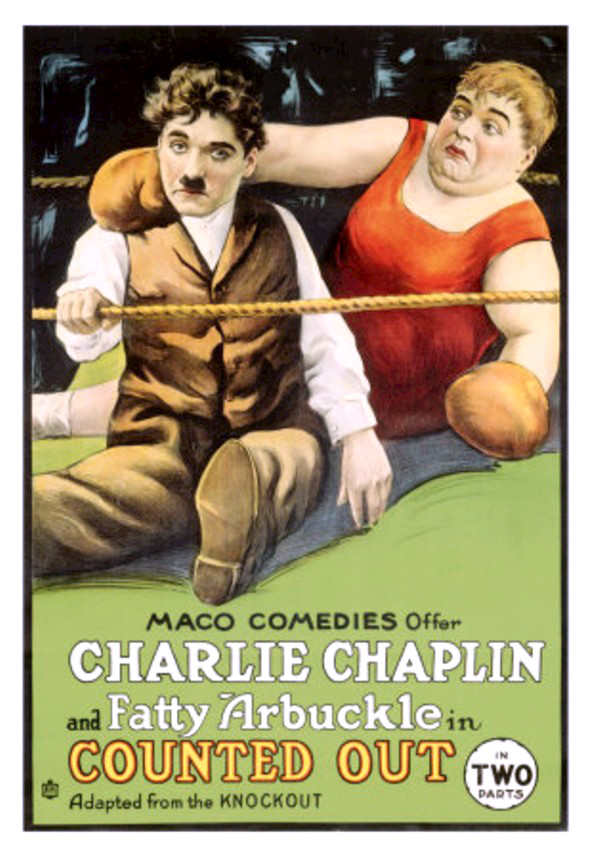
The Knockout (1914)

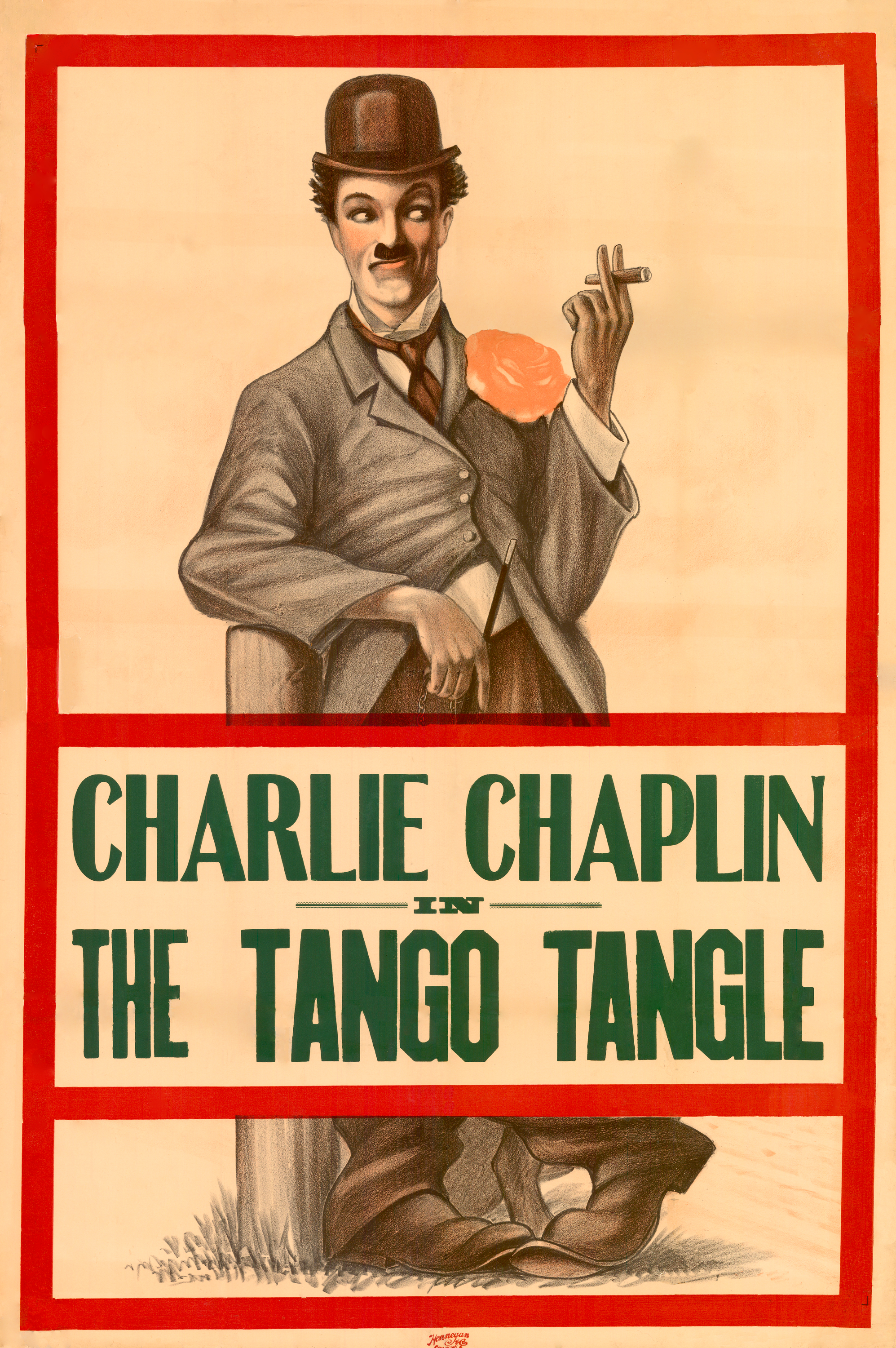
The Tango Tangle (1914)

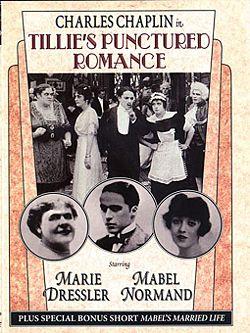
Tillie's Punctured Romance (1914)

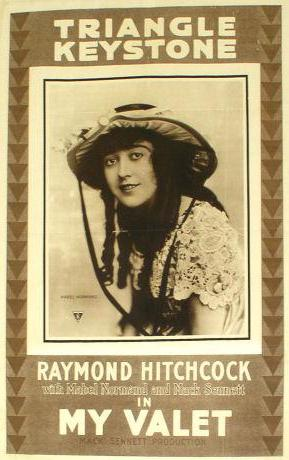
My Valet (1915)

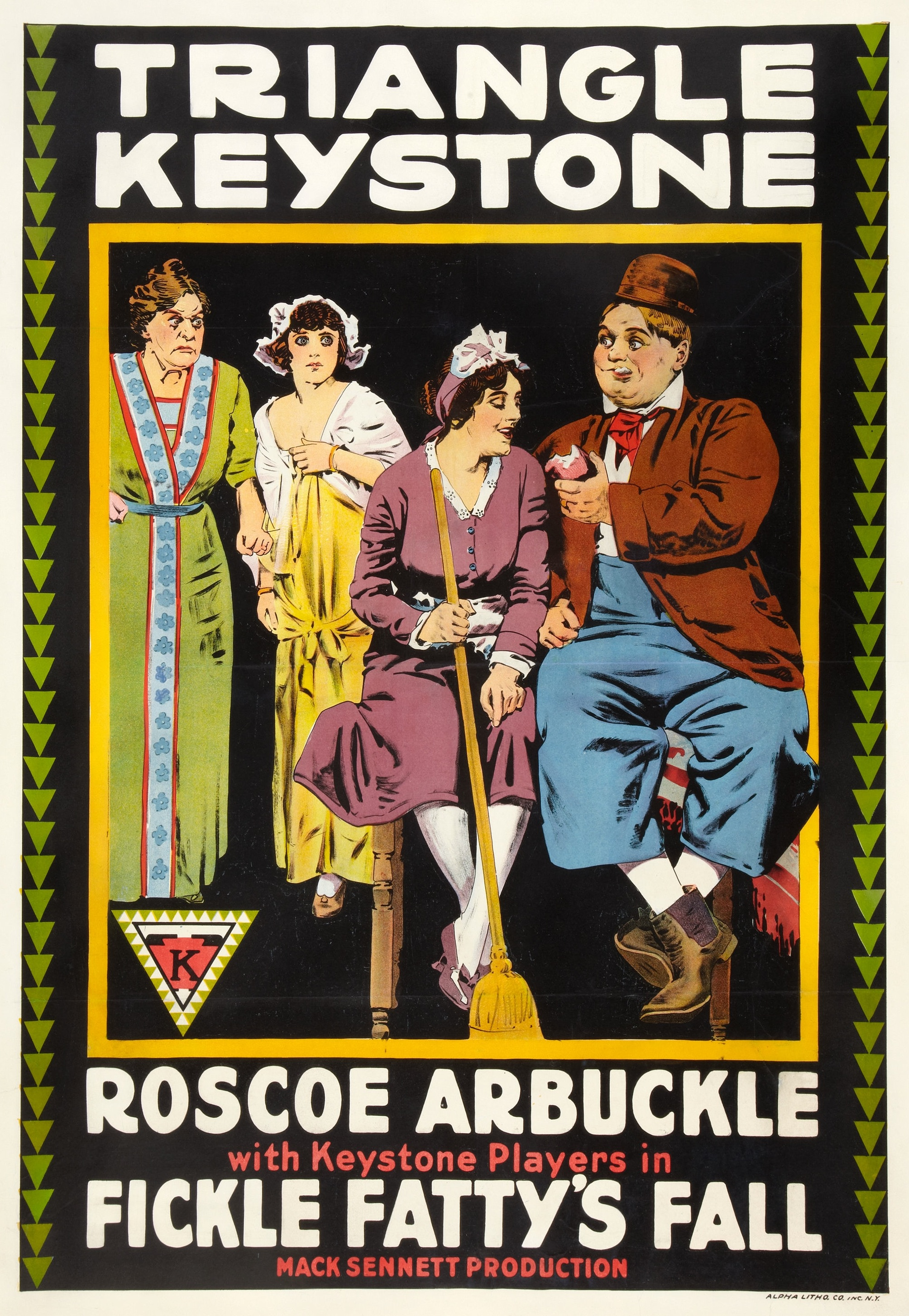
Fickle Fatty's Fall (1915)

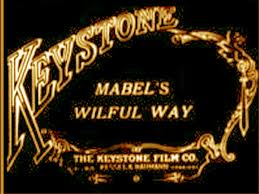
Mabel's Wilful Way (1915)

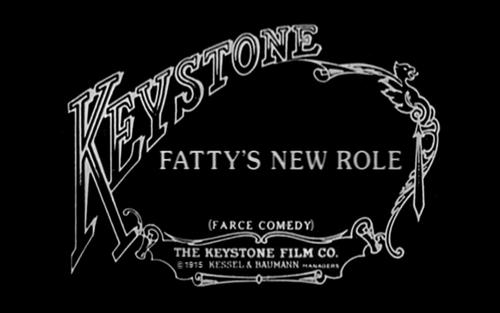
Fatty's New Role (1915)

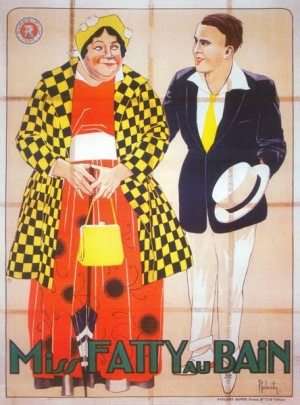
Miss Fatty's Seaside Lovers (1915)

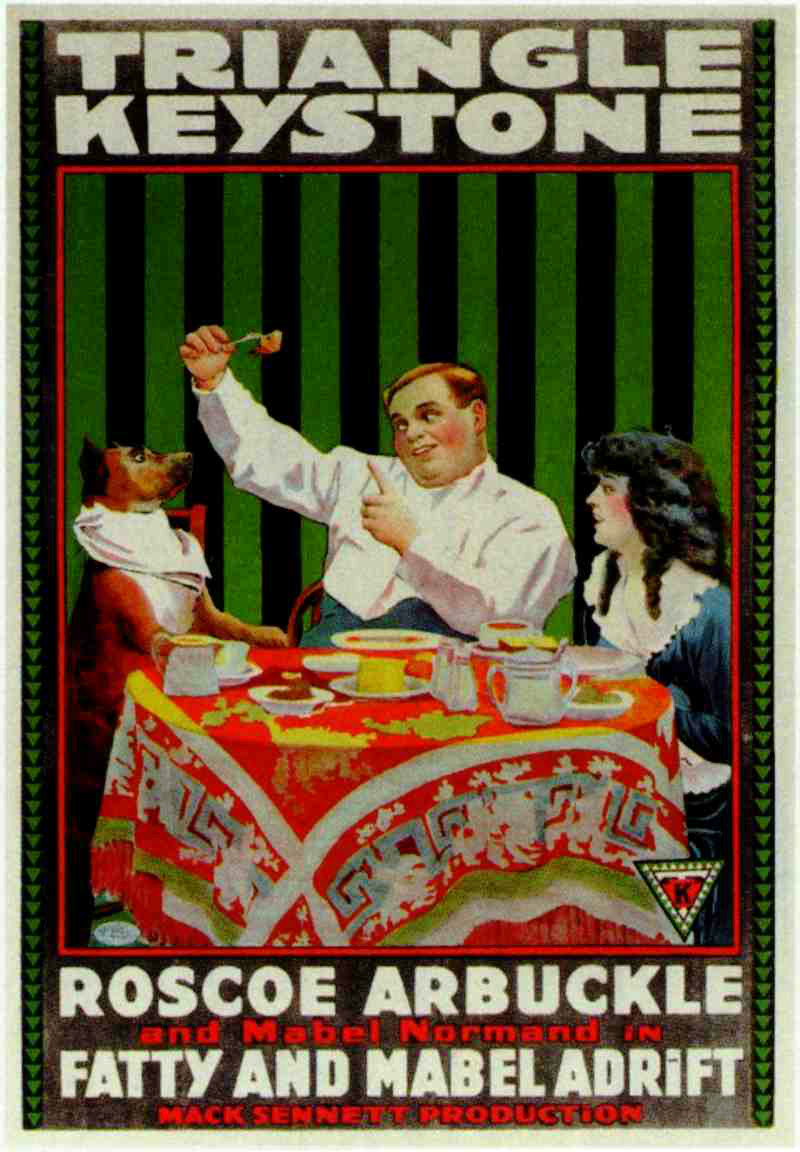
Fatty and Mabel Adrift (1916)

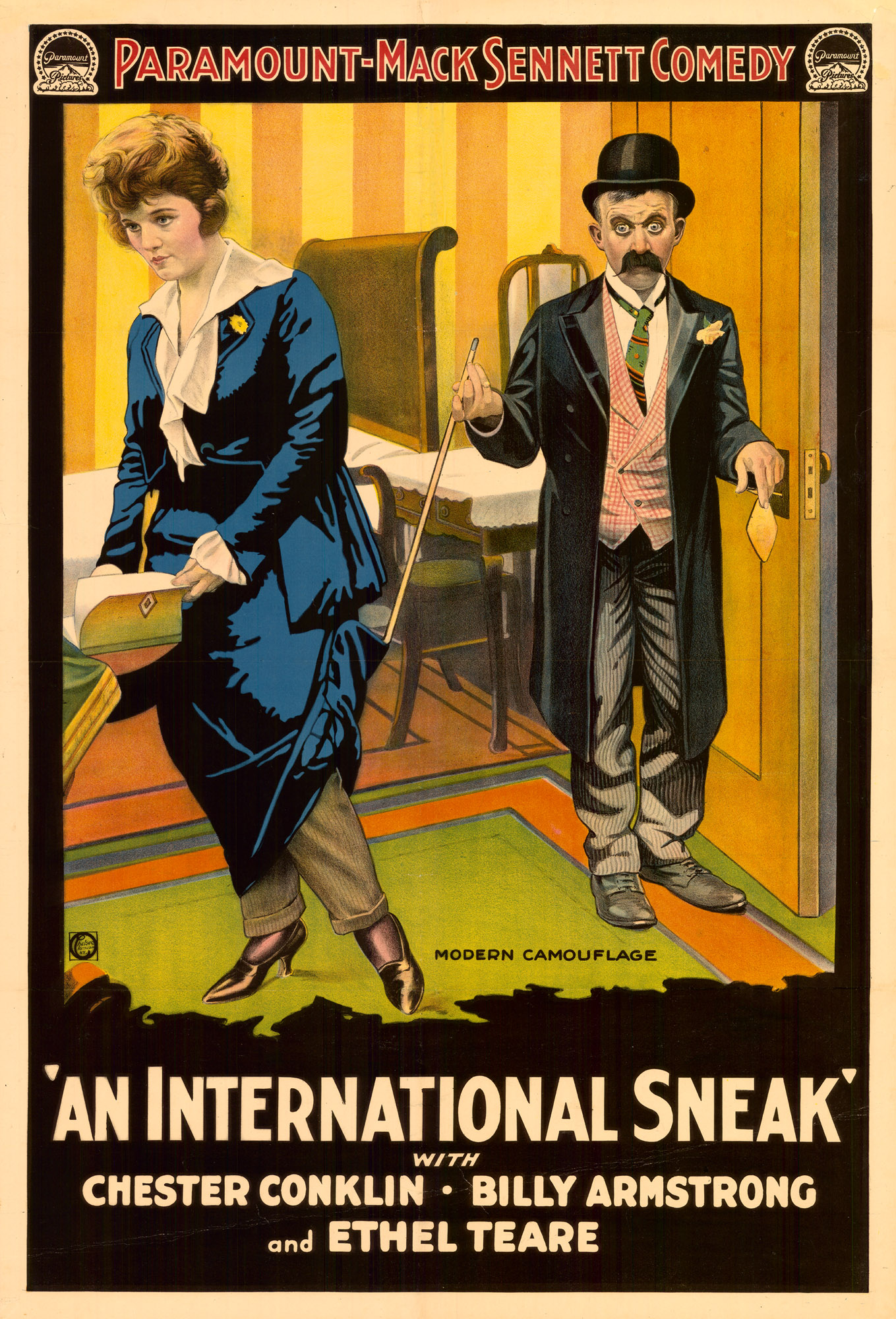
An International Sneak (1917)

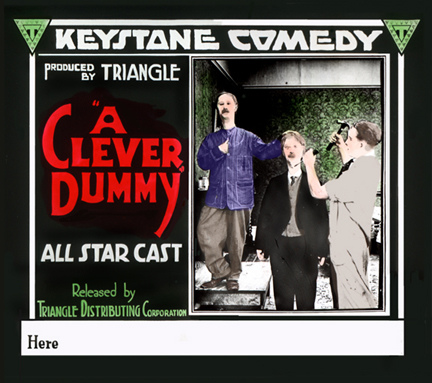
A Clever Dummy (1917)

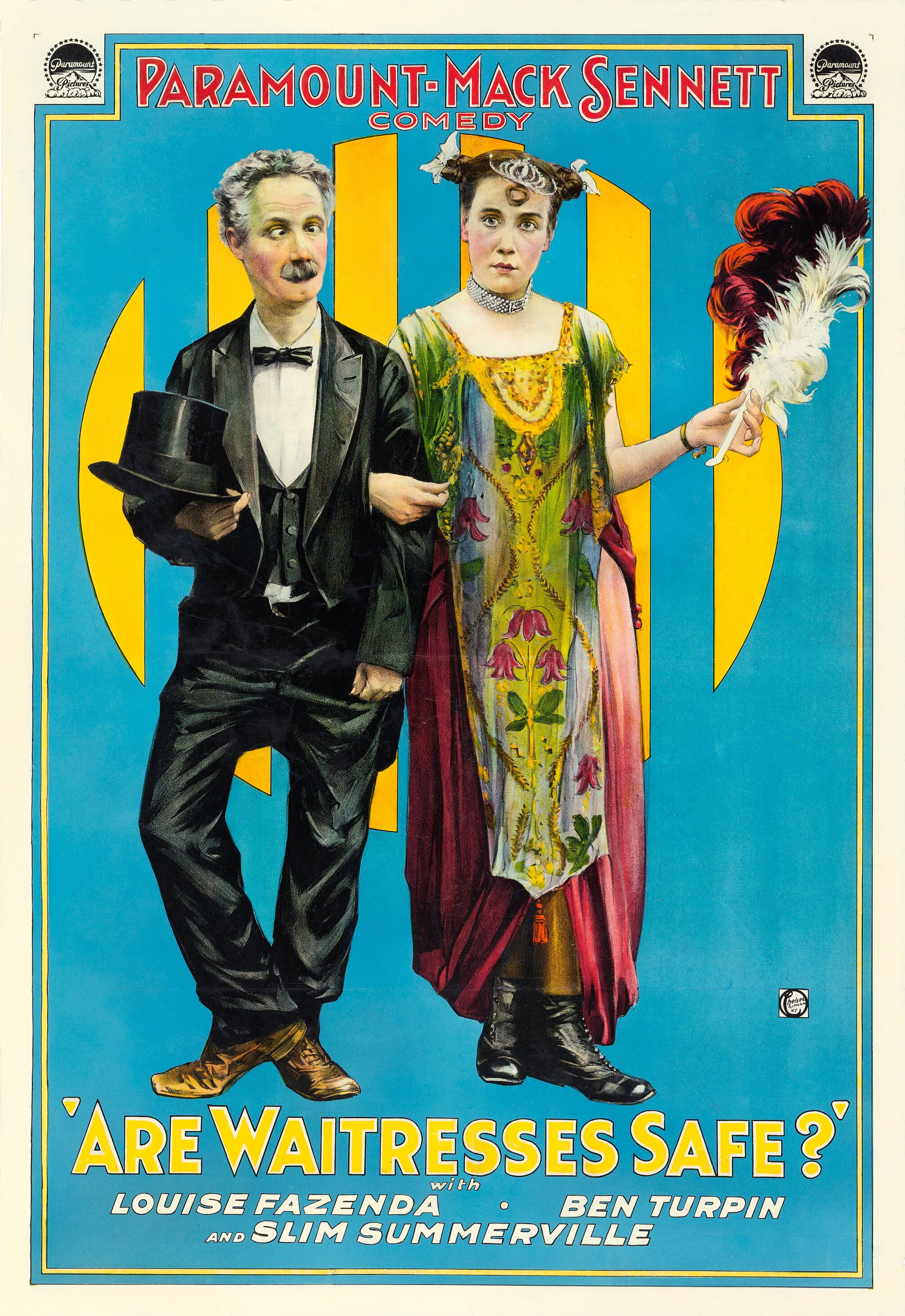
Are Waitresses Safe? (1917)

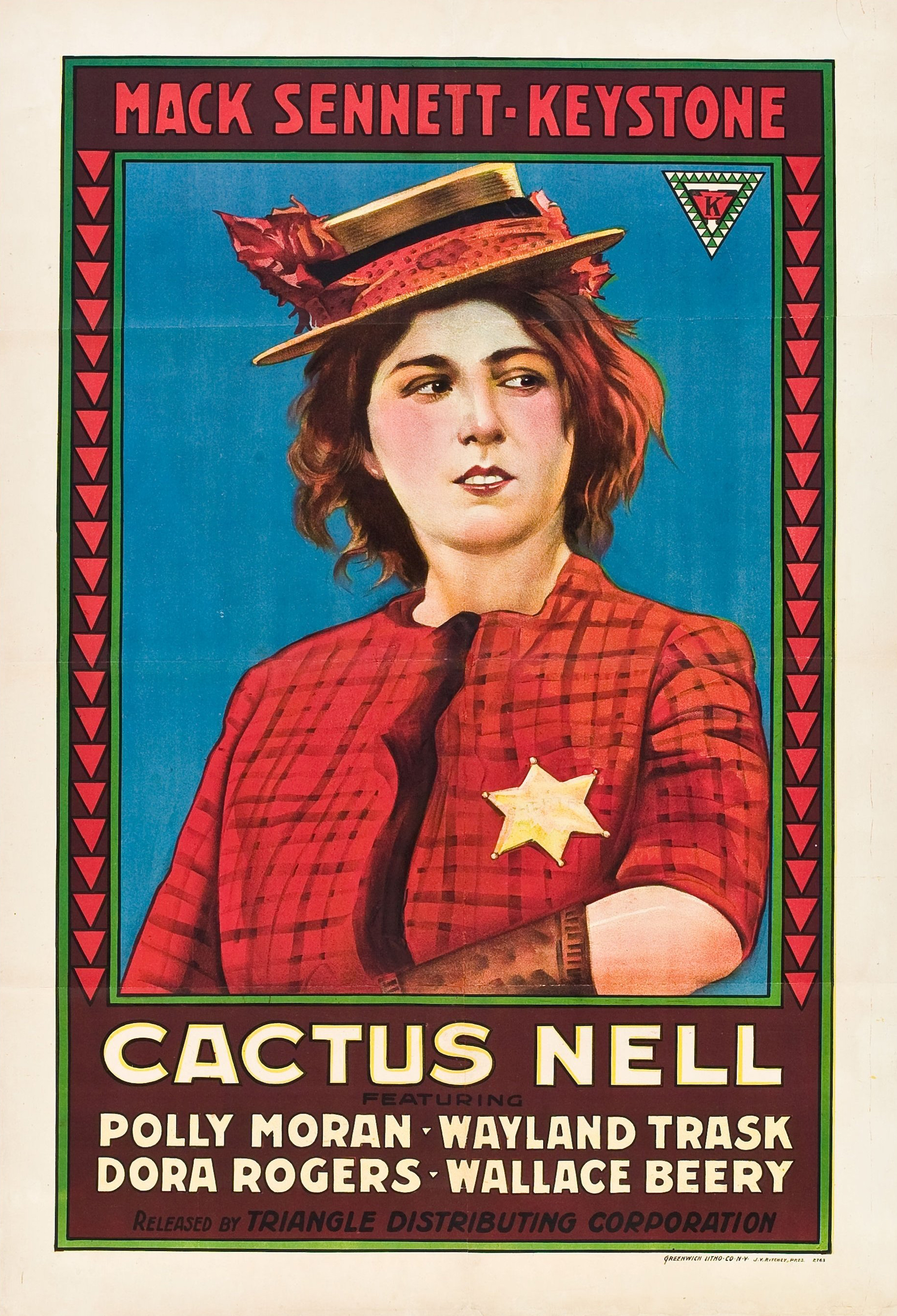
Cactus Nell (1917)

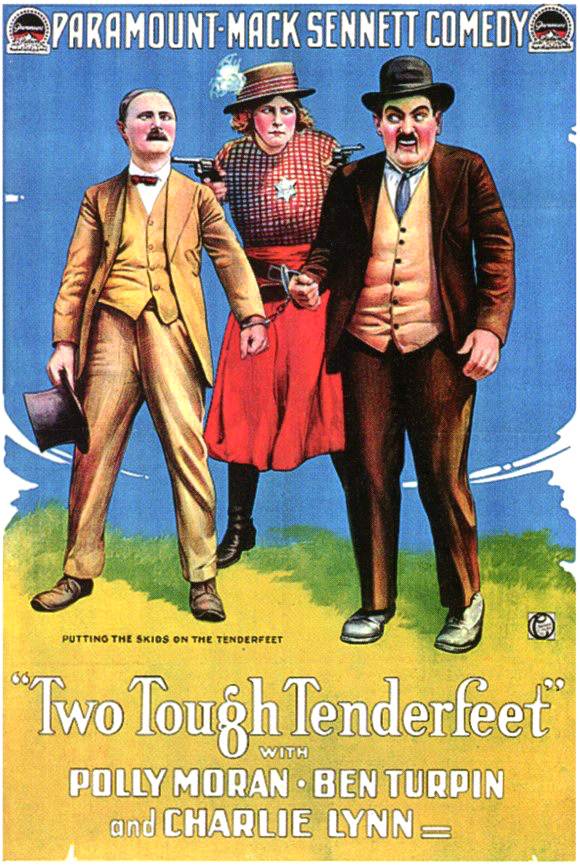
Two Tough Tenderfeet (1918)

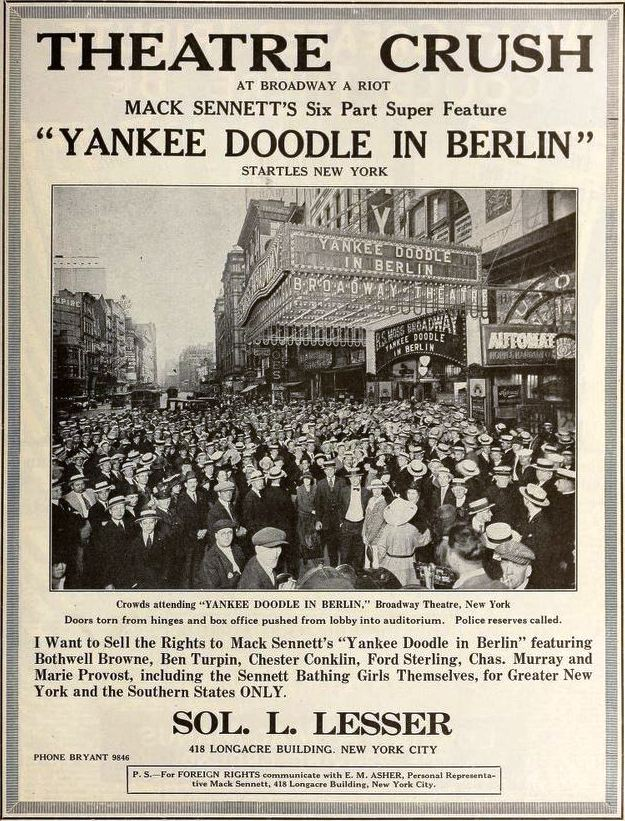
Yankee Doodle in Berlin (1919)

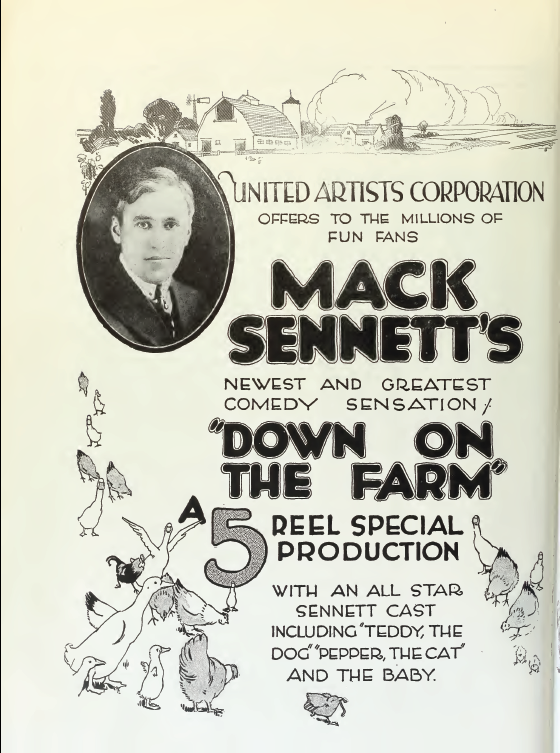
Down on the Farm (1920)

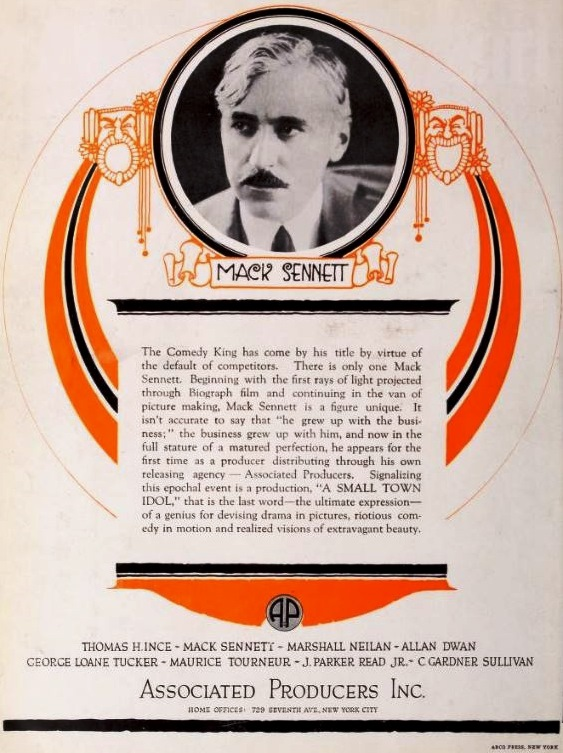
A Small Town Idol (1921)

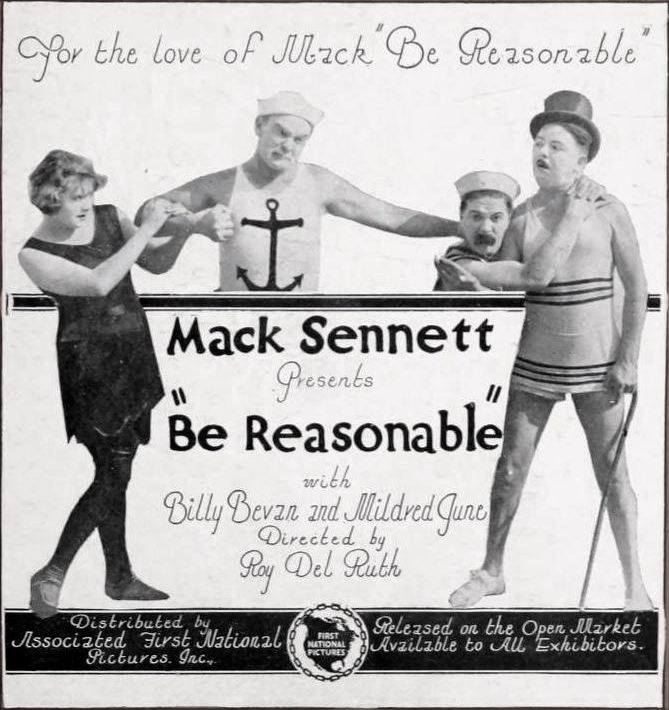
Be Reasonable (1921)

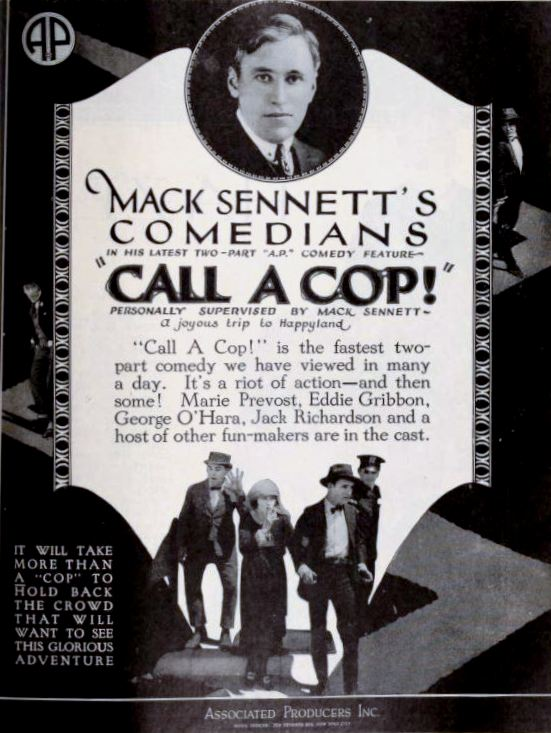
Call a Cop (1921)

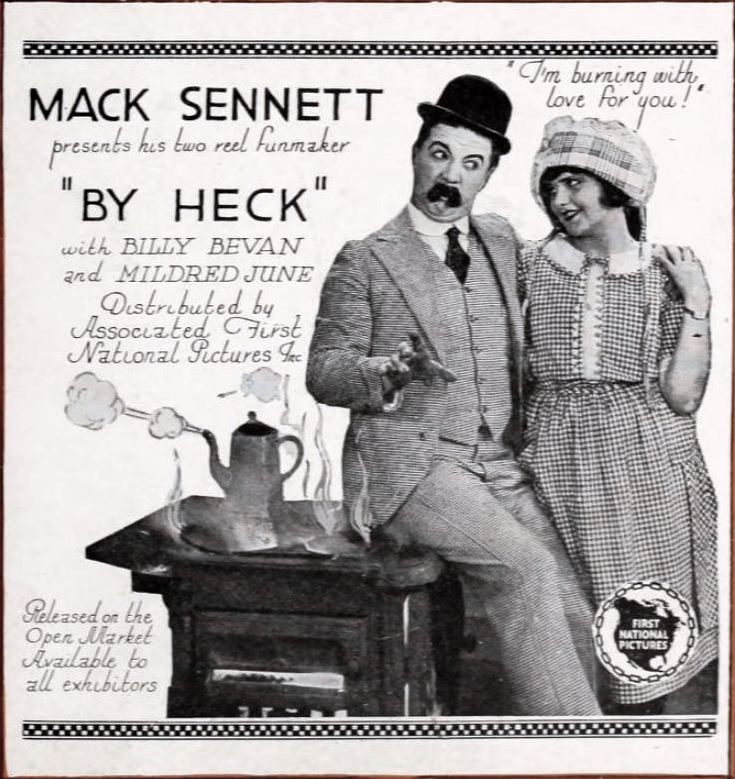
By Heck (1921)

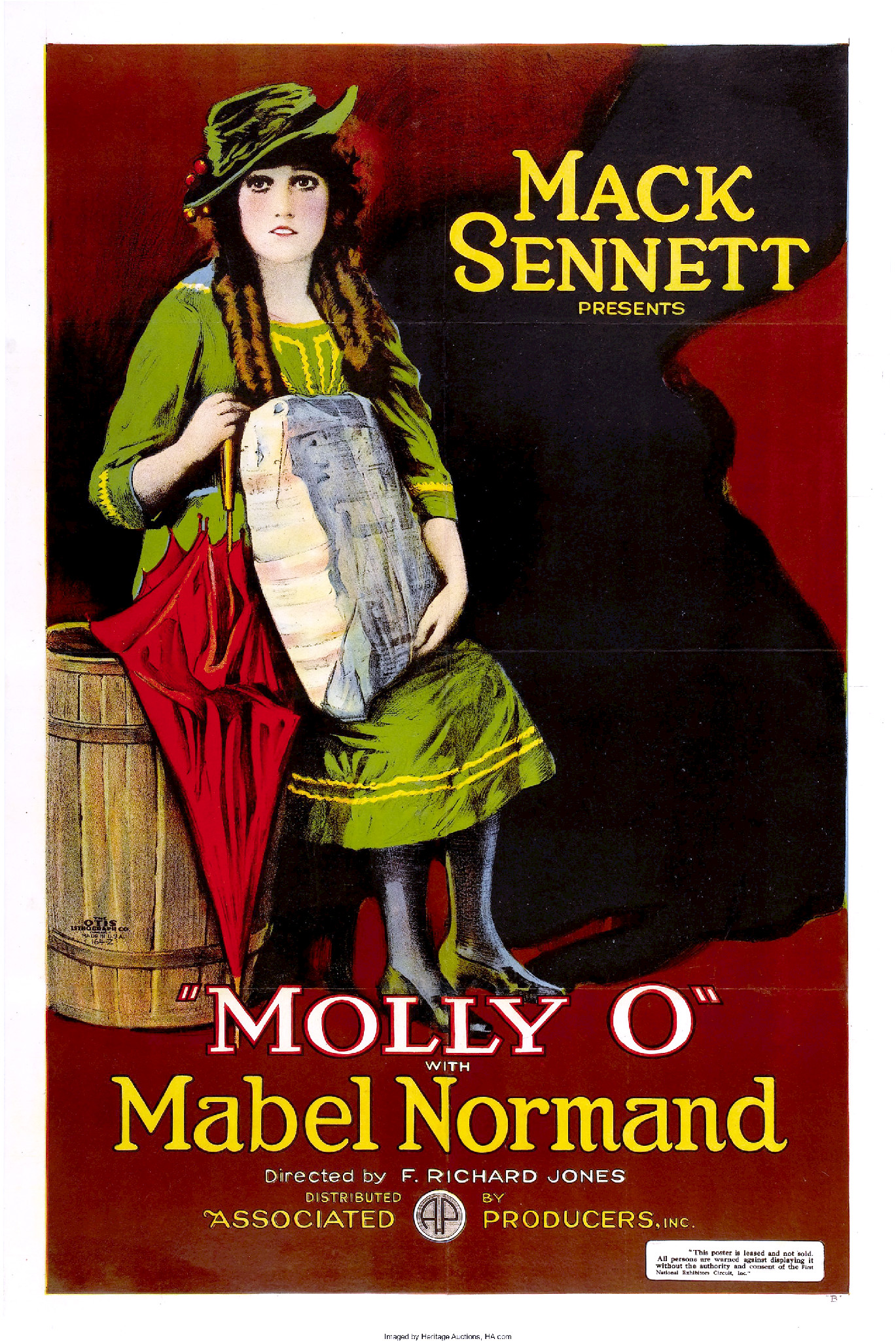
Molly O (1921)

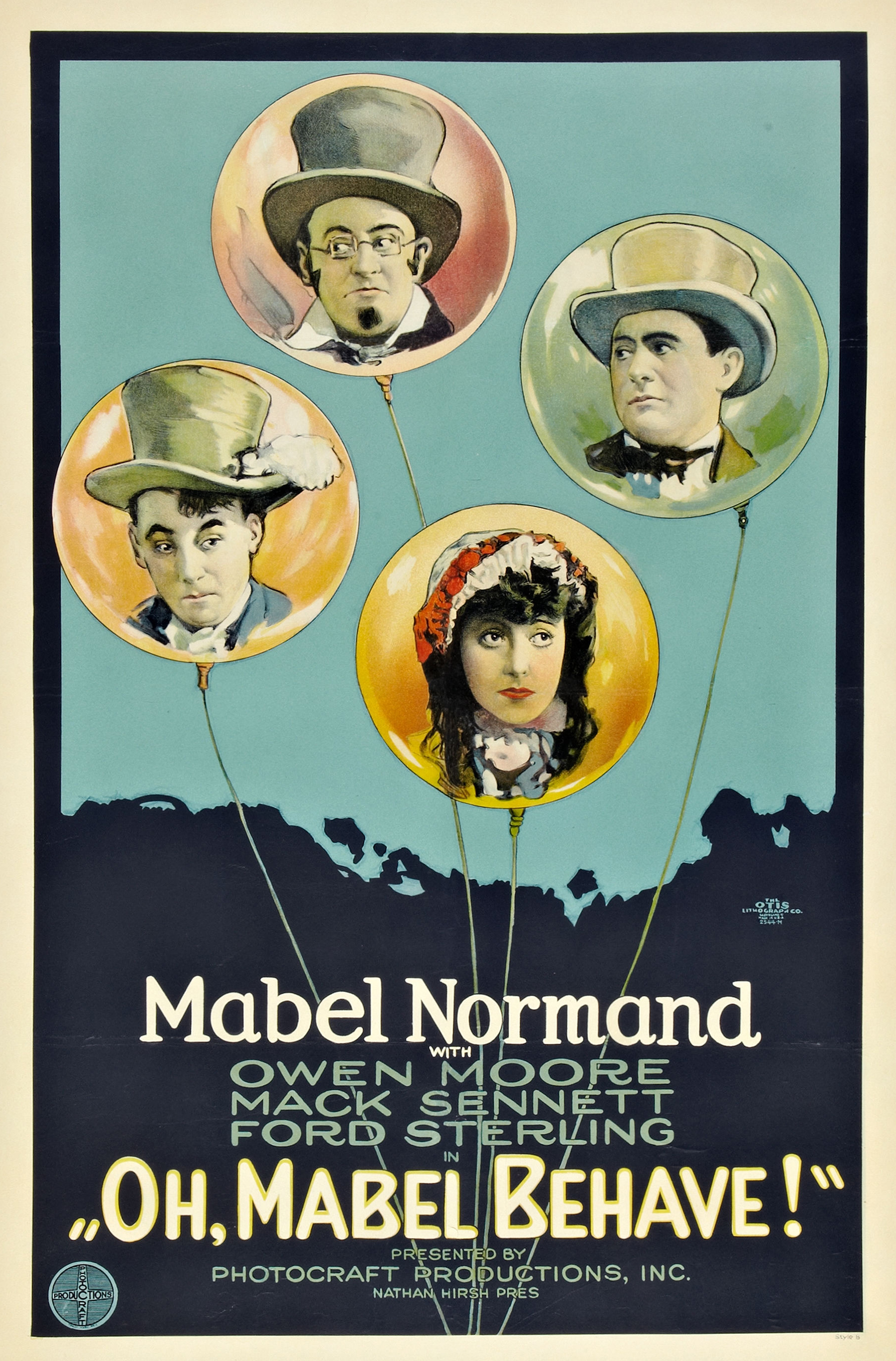
Oh, Mabel Behave (1922)

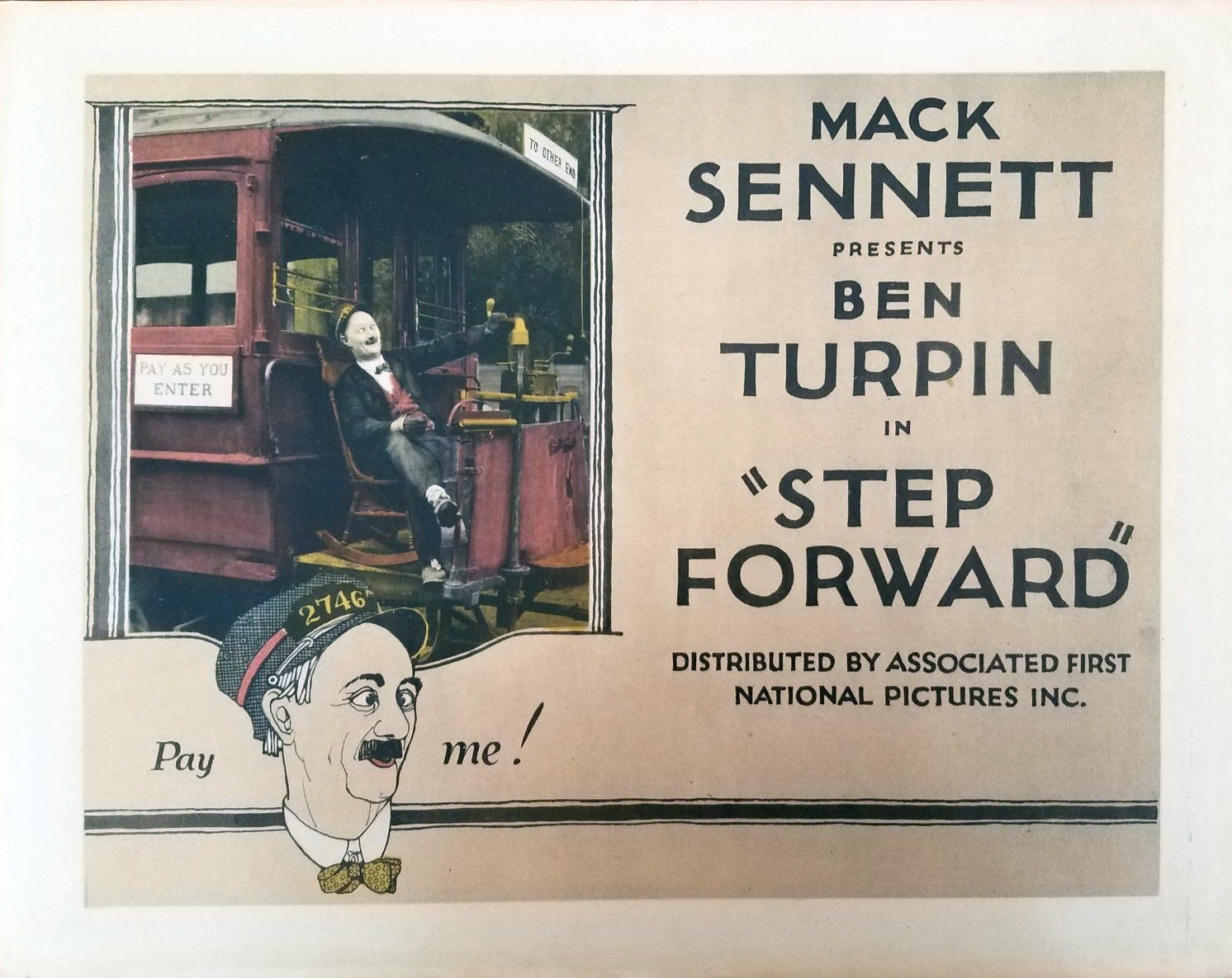
Step Forward (1922)

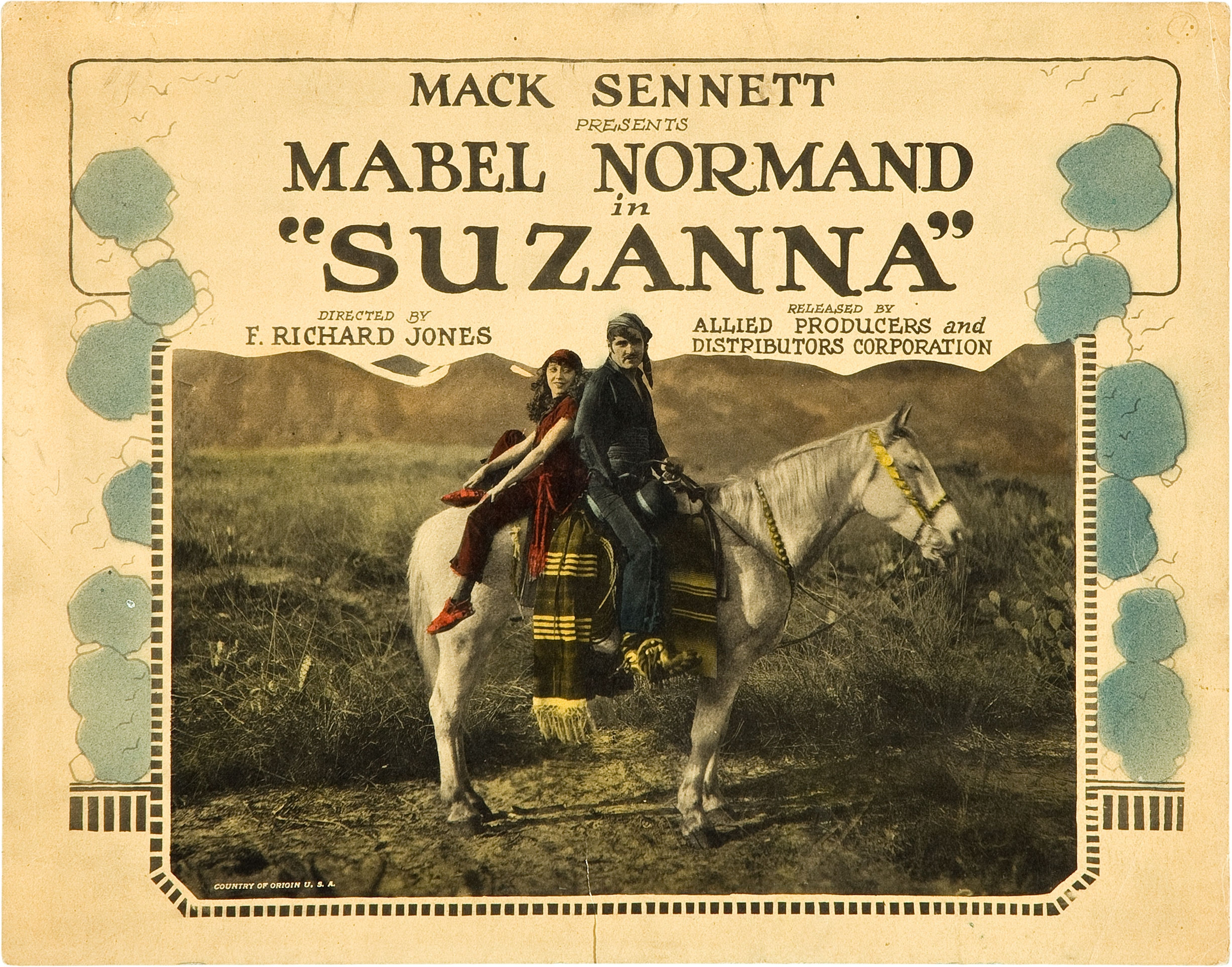
Suzanna (1923)

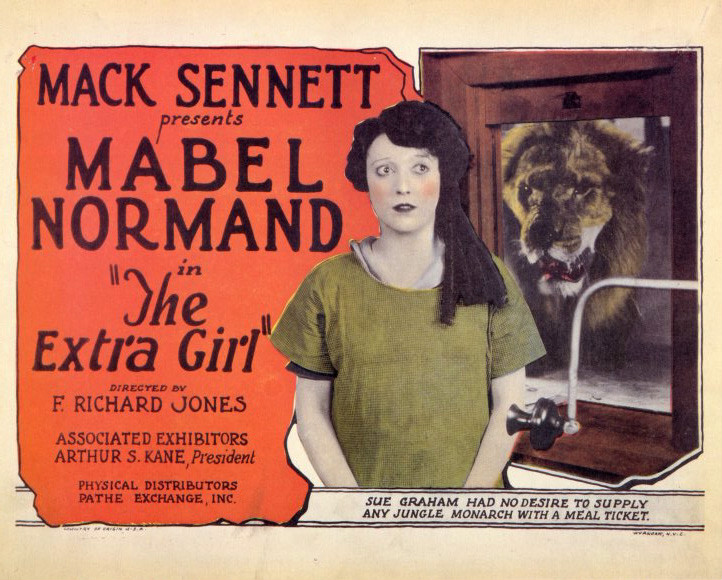
The Extra Girl (1923)

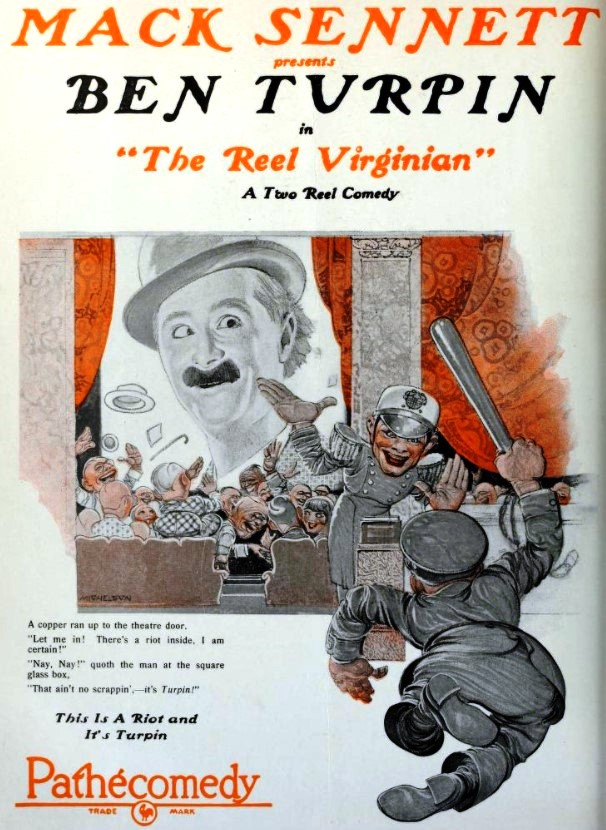
The Reel Virginian (1924)

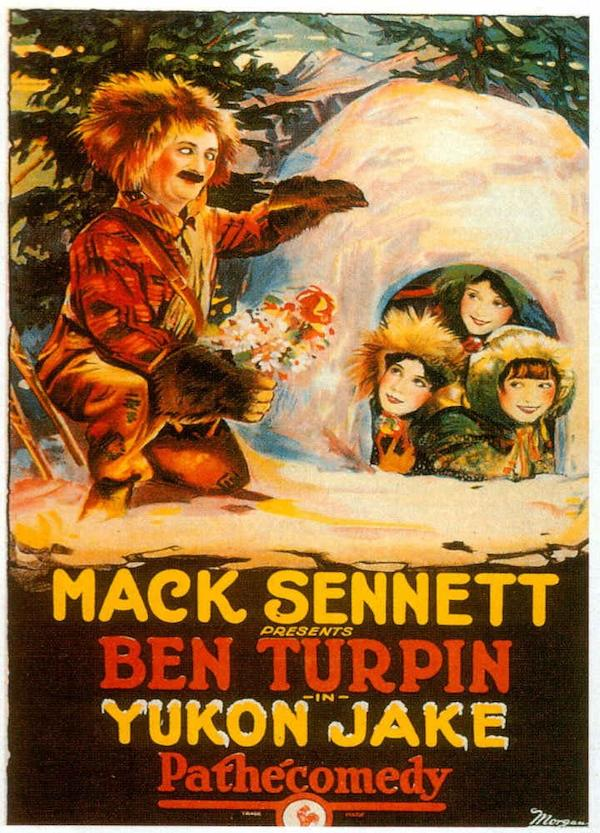
Yukon Jake (1924)

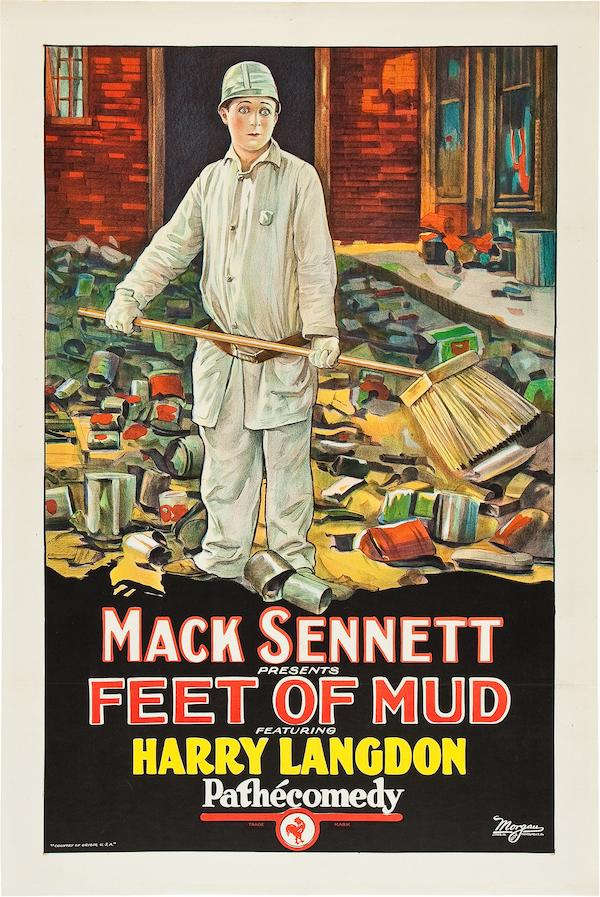
Feet of Mud (1924)

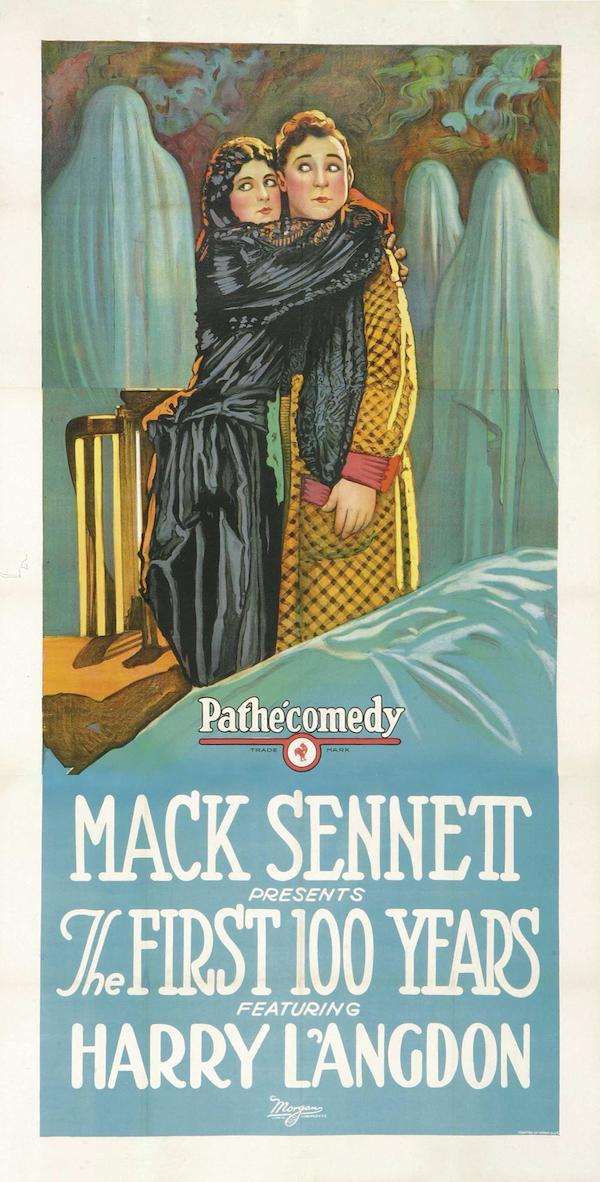
The First 100 Years (1924)

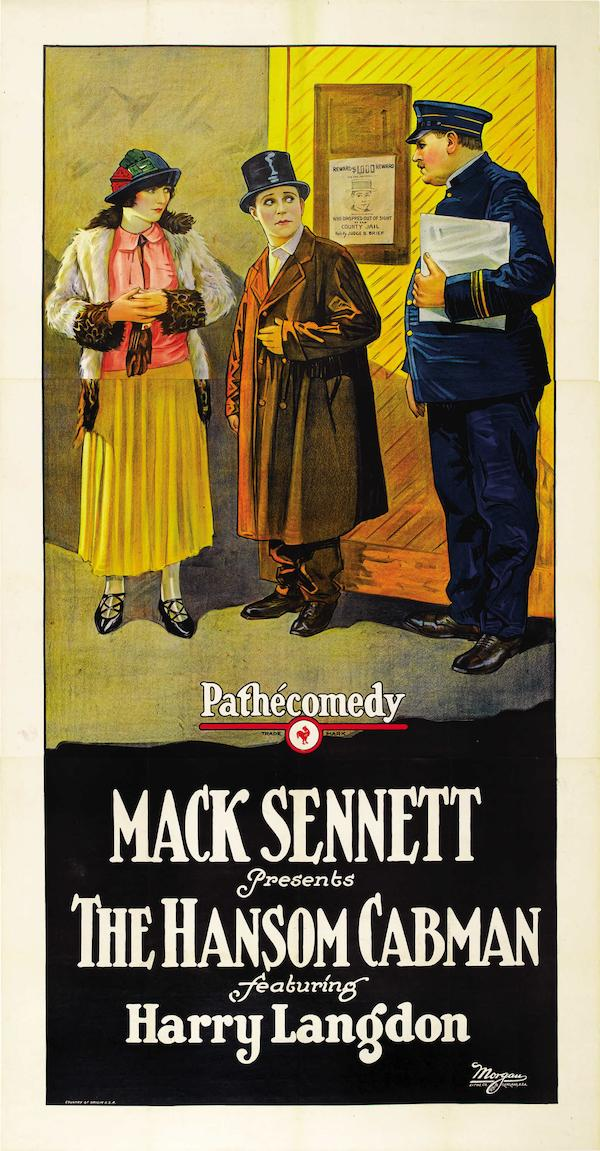
The Hansom Cabman (1924)

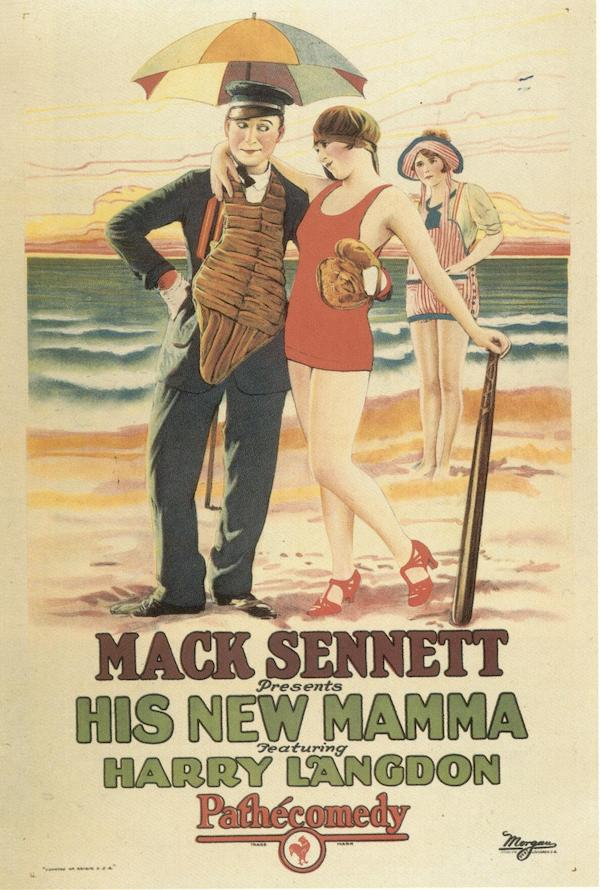
His New Mamma (1924)

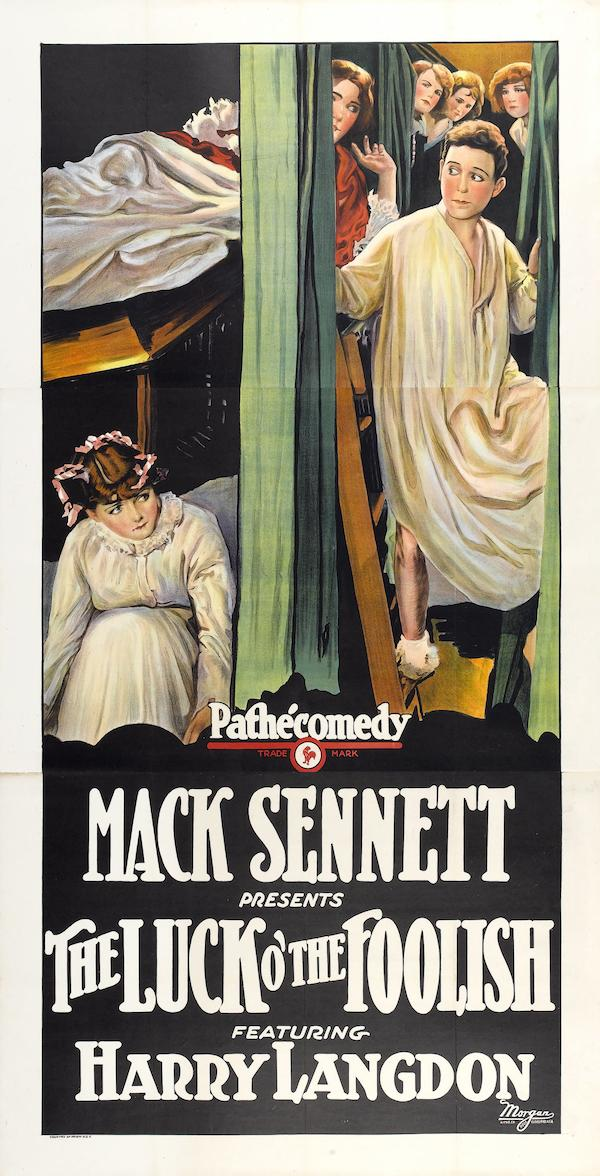
The Luck o' the Foolish (1924)

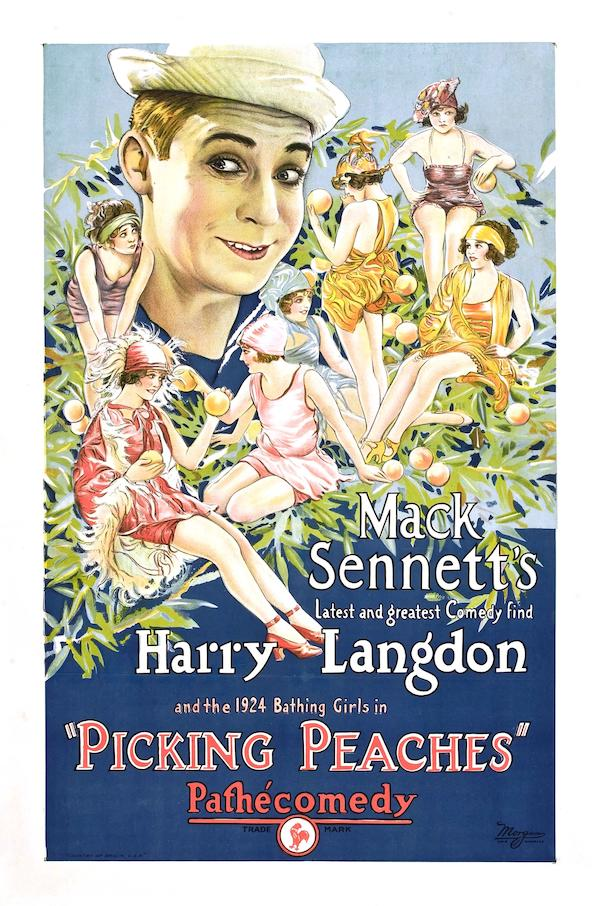
Picking Peaches (1924)

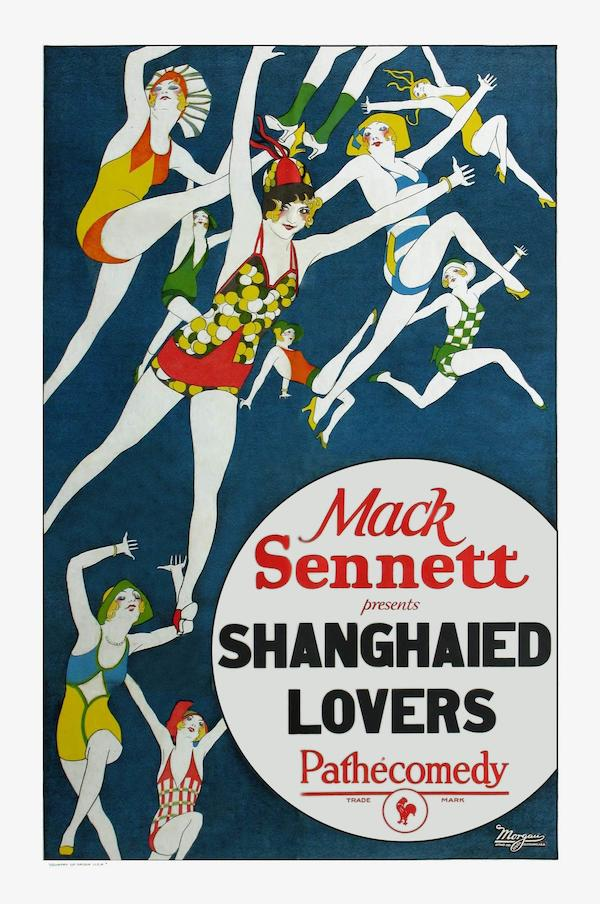
Shanghaied Lovers (1924)

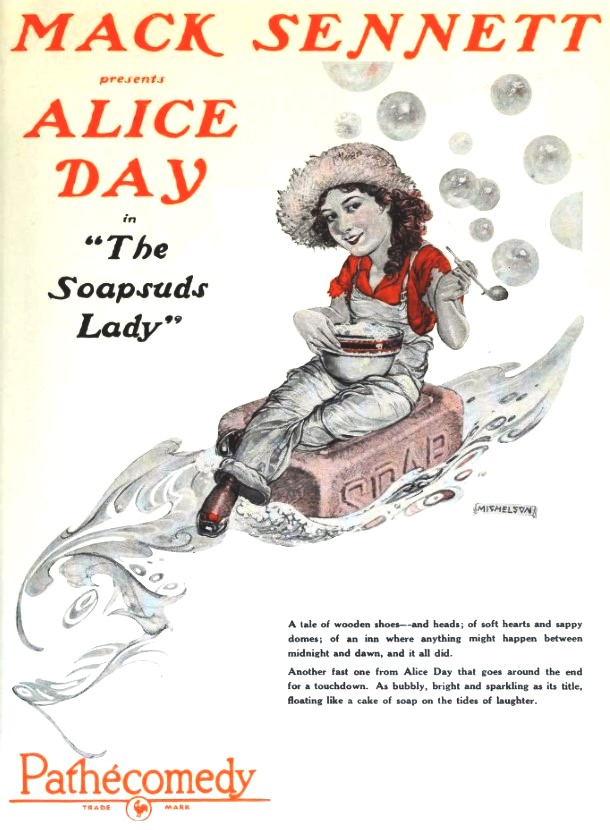
The Soapsuds Lady (1925)

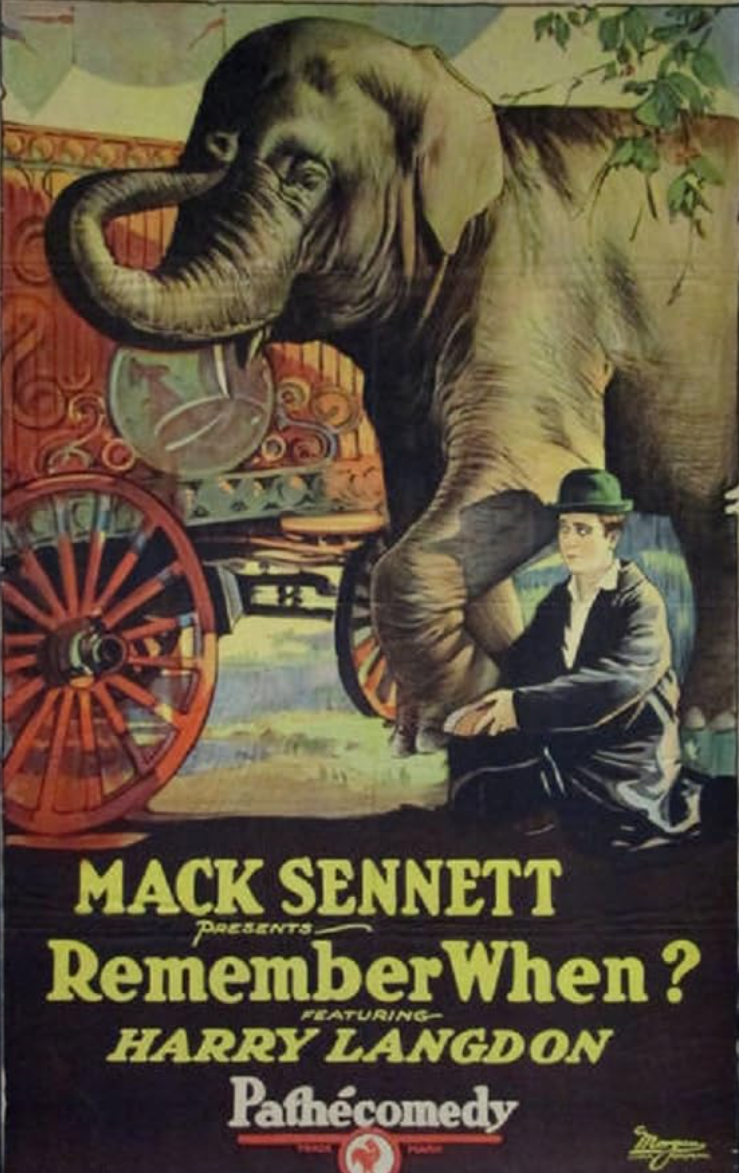
Remember When? (1925)

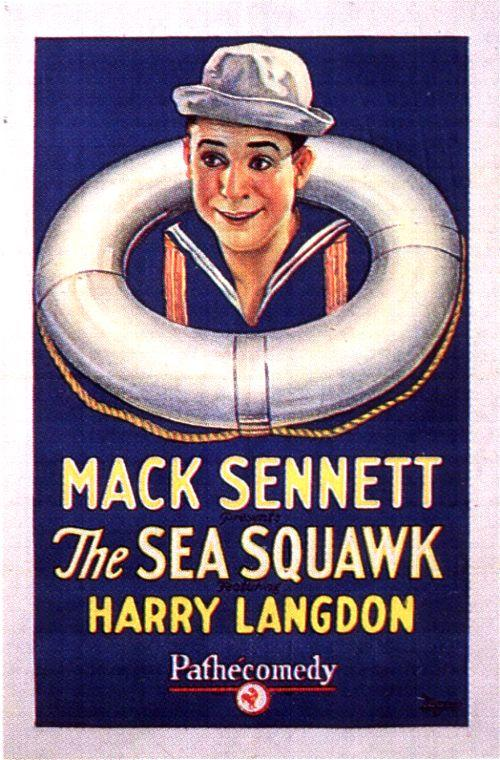
The Sea Squawk (1925)

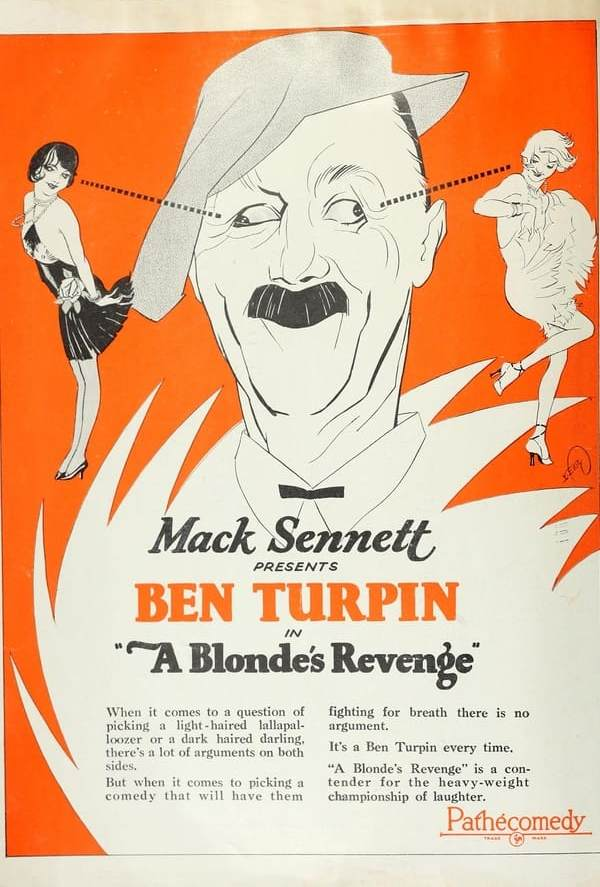
A Blonde's Revenge (1926)

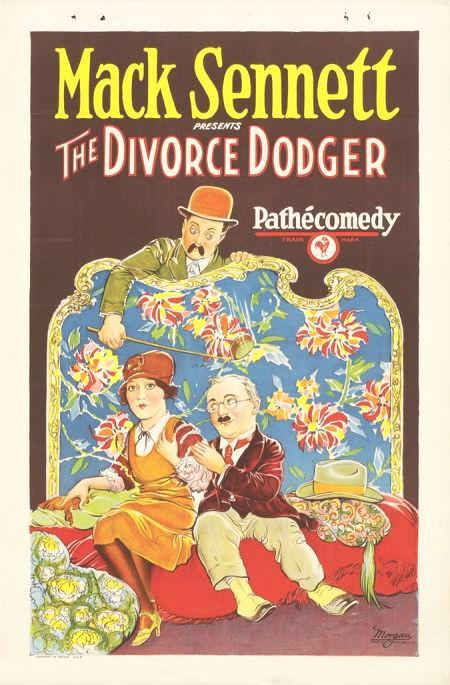
The Divorce Dogder (1926)

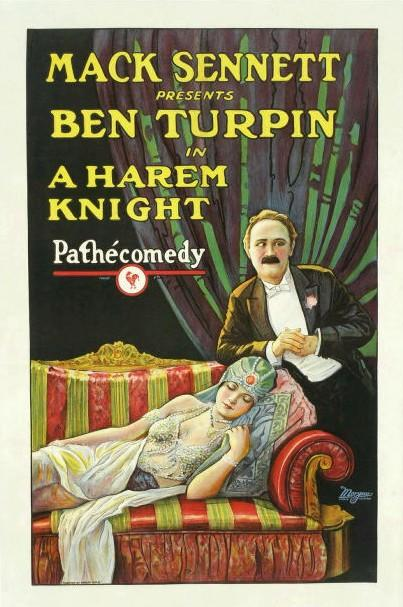
A Harem Knight (1926)

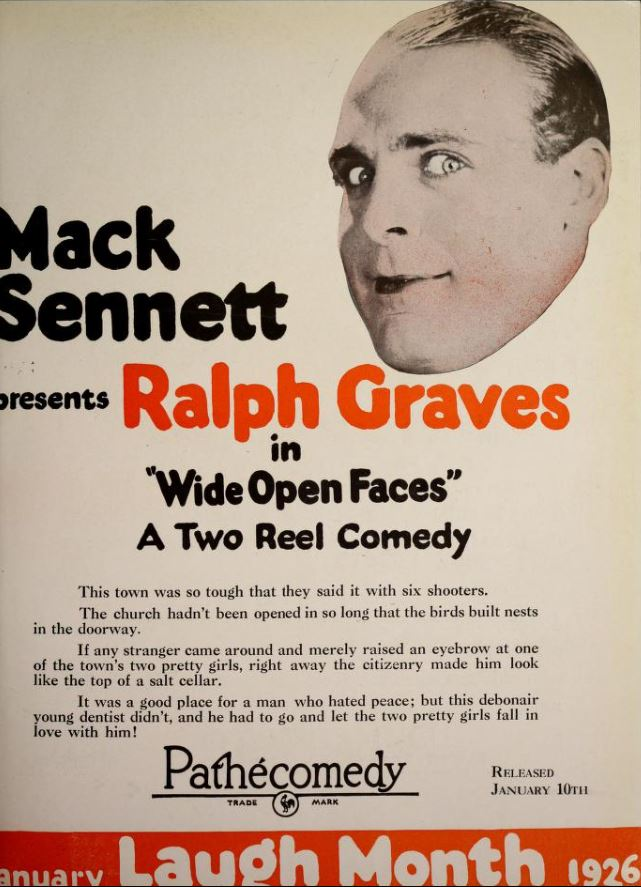
Wide Open Faces (1926)

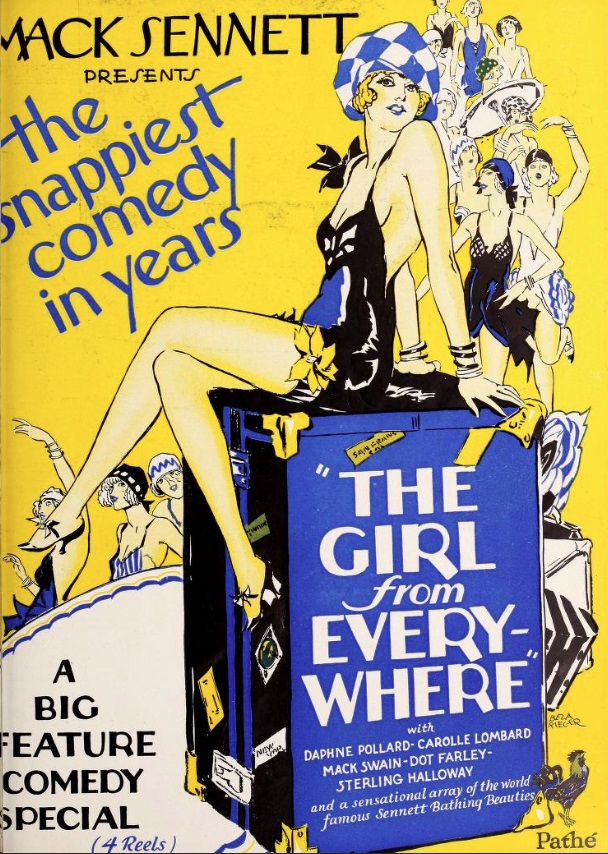
The Girl from Everywhere (1927)

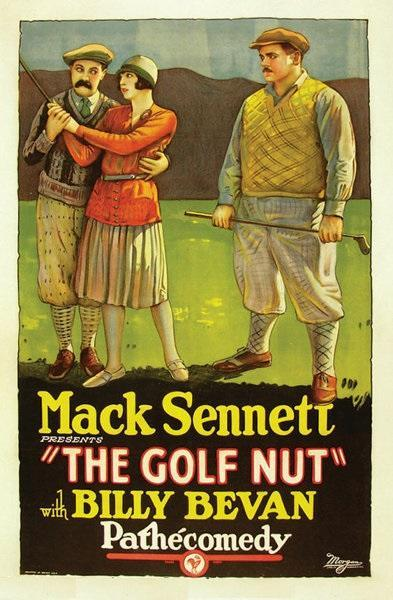
The Golf Nut (1927)

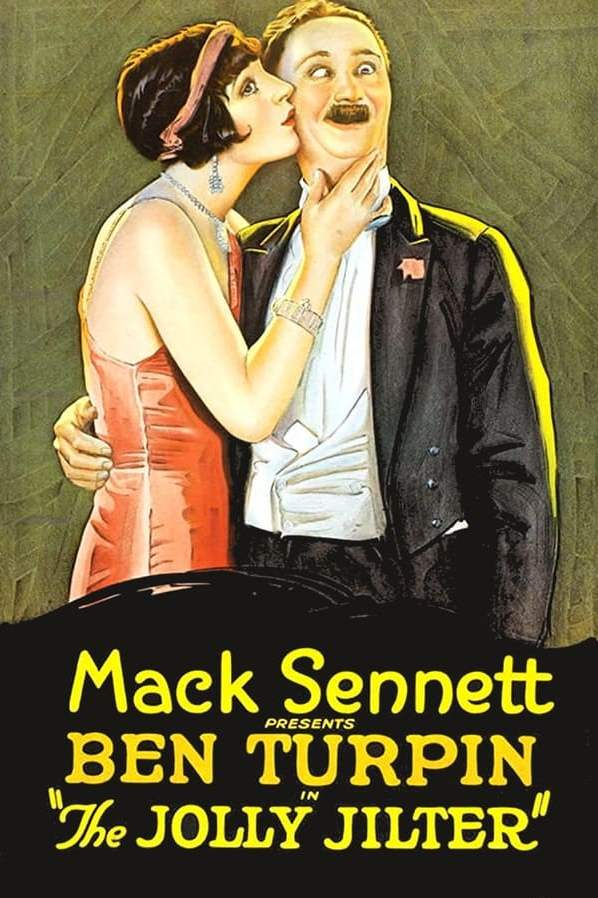
The Jolly Jilter (1927)

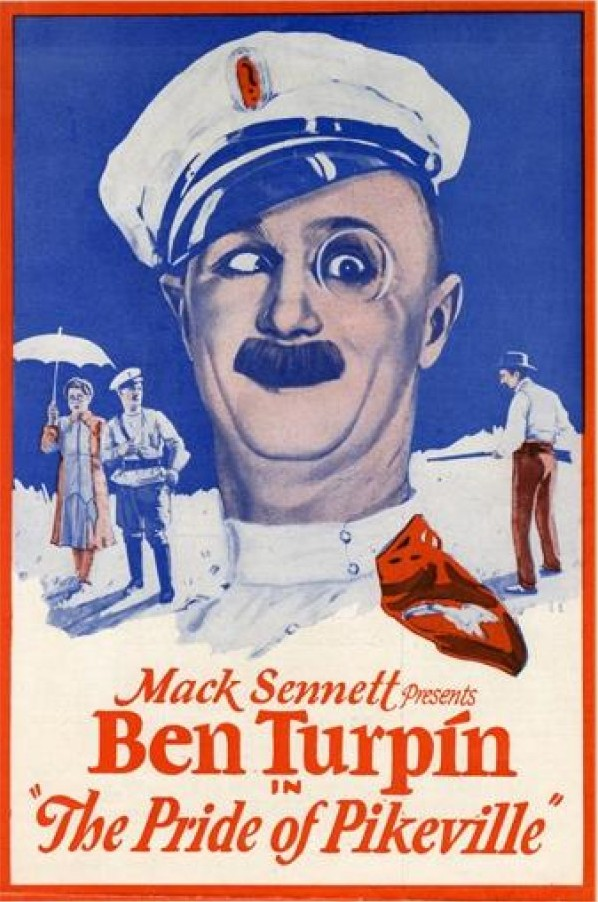
The Pride of Pikeville (1927)

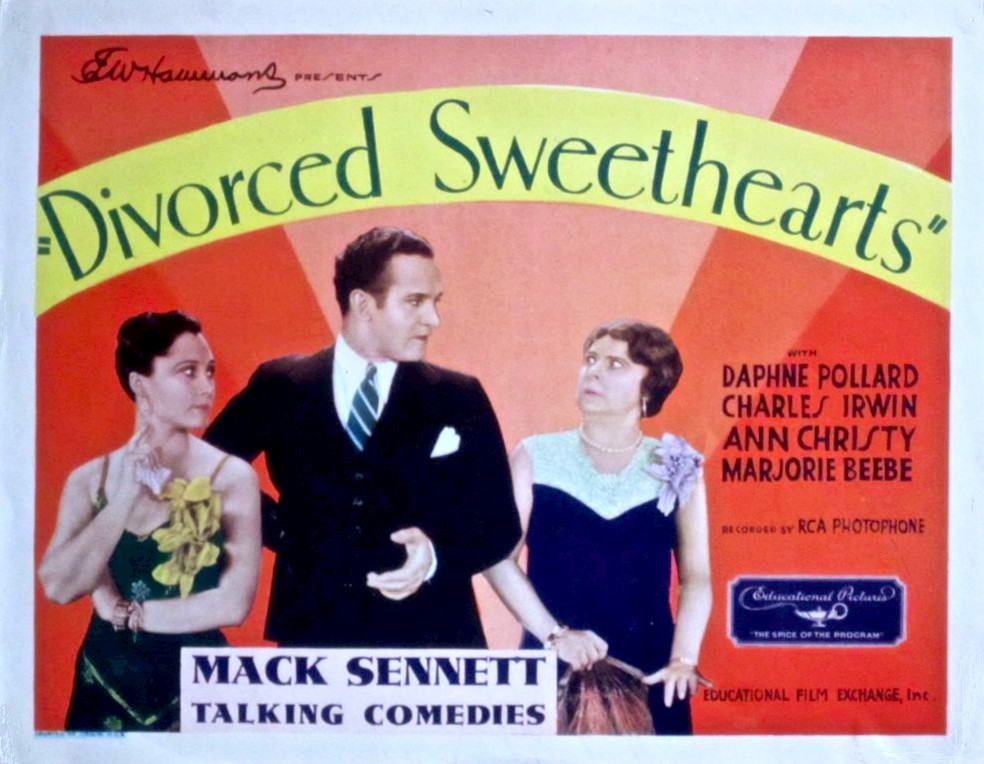
Divorced Sweethearts (1930)

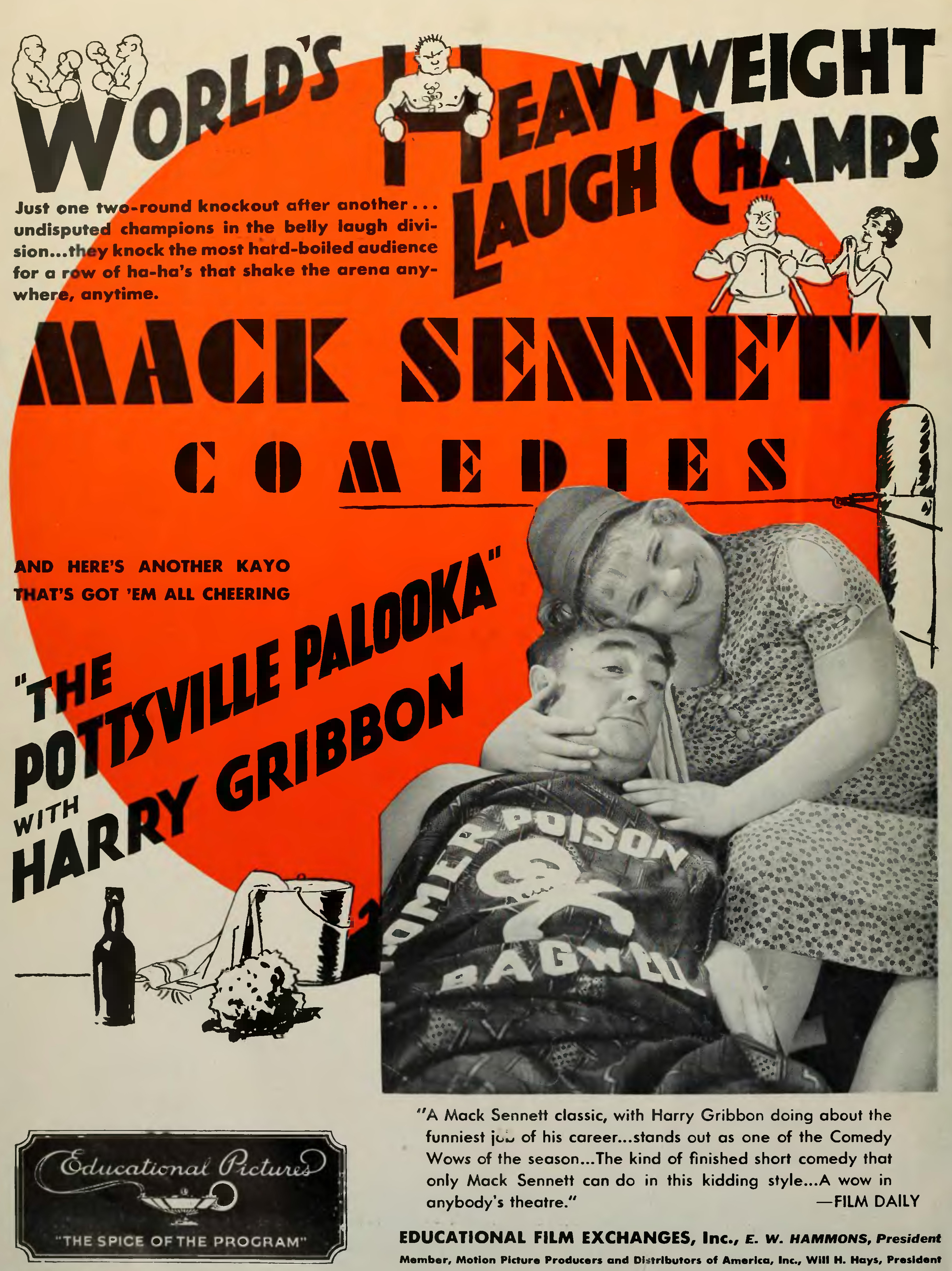
The Pottsville Palooka ad from The Film Daily (1932)
Mack Sennett Studios (1917)
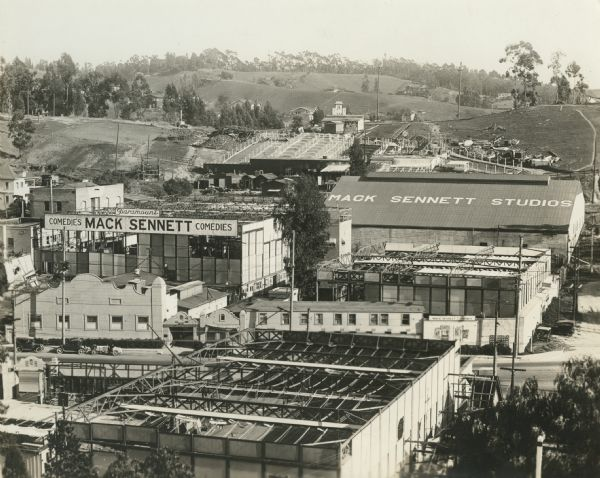

== Bibliography ==
=== References ===
- Bradley, Edward M. (November 12, 2001). "American Film Short Subjects and the Industry's Transition to Sound" (PDF) (masters thesis). University of Michigan-Flint. Archived from the original (PDF) on January 9, 2024. OCLC 1291413218.
- Drew, Bernard Alger (December 4, 2013) [1990]. Motion Picture Series and Sequels: A Reference Guide. LCCN 90-3321.
1. Via Google Books (limited preview). Routledge. 2013. p. 393. ISBN 978-1-3179-2893-5, 1-3179-2893-8, ISBN 978-1-3179-2894-2, 1-3179-2894-6.
2. Via Internet Archive (limited preview). New York & London: Garland Publishing, Inc. 1990. p. 42.
