= My Valet =

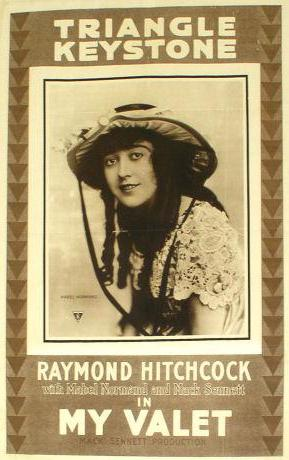
- Theatrical poster
- Directed by: Mack Sennett
- Written by: Mack Sennett
- Produced by: Mack Sennett
- Starring: Raymond Hitchcock; Mack Sennett; Mabel Normand
- Production company: Keystone Film Company
- Distributed by: Triangle Film Corporation
- Release date: November 7, 1915
- Running time: 33 minutes
- Country: United States
- Language: English

My Valet is a 1915 short comedy film written, produced, and directed by Mack Sennett and starring Raymond Hitchcock, Sennett, and Mabel Normand. The film was released by the Keystone Film Company and Triangle Distributing with a running time of 33 minutes. It was released on November 7, 1915 in the United States. A print exists.

== Cast ==
- Raymond Hitchcock as John Jones
- Mack Sennett as John's Valet
- Mabel Normand as Mabel Stebbins
- Fred Mace as French Count
- Frank Opperman (actor) as Hiram Stebbins
- Alice Davenport as Mrs. Stebbins

== Production and release ==
The filming and promotion of My Valet was a major endeavor for producer Mack Sennett. A four-reeler, it first appeared in New York on September 23, 1915 marking the formation of Triangle-Keystone, the studio’s first release.
