= Miss Fatty's Seaside Lovers =

1915 film

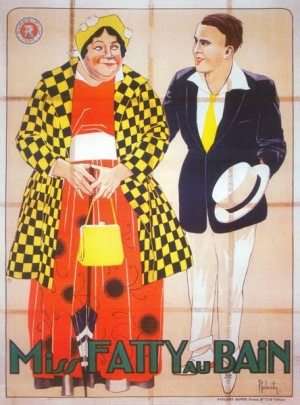
- Film poster
- Directed by: Fatty Arbuckle
- Produced by: Mack Sennett
- Starring: Fatty Arbuckle; Harold Lloyd
- Production company: Keystone Studios
- Distributed by: Mutual Film
- Release date: May 15, 1915
- Running time: 11 minutes
- Country: United States
- Languages: Silent; English intertitles

Miss Fatty's Seaside Lovers is a 1915 American silent short comedy film directed by and starring Fatty Arbuckle and featuring Harold Lloyd.

== Plot ==
Three fortune-hunting suitors target a rich heiress.

== Cast ==
The cast includes:

- Roscoe "Fatty" Arbuckle: Finnegan's Daughter
- Walter Reed: Finnegan, Mothball Magnate
- Billie Bennett: Mrs. Finnegan, His Wife
- Joe Bordeaux: Suitor
- Edgar Kennedy: Suitor
- Harold Lloyd: Suitor
- Billy Gilbert: Bellhop

Miss Fatty’s Seaside Lovers (1915)

== Preservation ==
A 16 mm copy of the film is held by George Eastman House.

== See also ==
- Fatty Arbuckle filmography
- Harold Lloyd filmography
