= The Road to Hollywood =

1947 film by Mack Sennett, Del Lord, Leslie Pearce

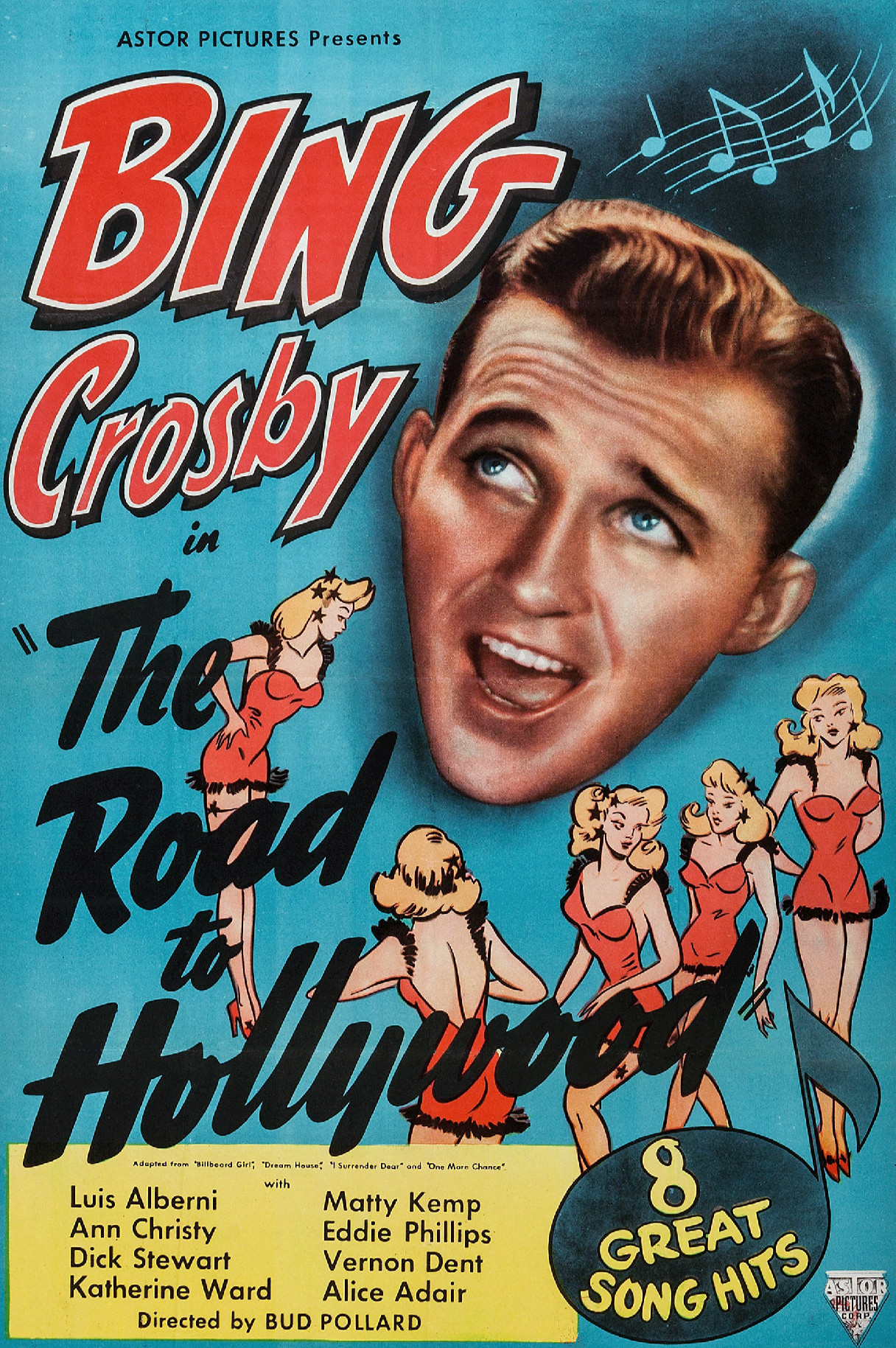
- Original Film poster
- Directed by: Bud Pollard; Del Lord; Leslie Pearce; Mack Sennett
- Written by: John E. Gordon (adaptation); Harry McCoy (material); Earle Rodney (material); John A. Waldron (material)
- Produced by: Bud Pollard (producer); Robert M. Savini (executive producer)
- Starring: See below
- Cinematography: Charles P. Boyle; Frank B. Good; George Unholz
- Edited by: Bud Pollard
- Distributed by: Astor Pictures
- Release date: 1947
- Running time: 56 minutes
- Country: United States
- Language: English

The Road to Hollywood is a 1947 American film released by Astor Pictures that is a combination of several of Bing Crosby's Educational Pictures short subjects. The title was designed to draft off Paramount Pictures' "Road to..." film series starring Crosby, Bob Hope, and Dorothy Lamour; Hope and Lamour do not appear in the film.

== Plot ==
Bud Pollard narrates a biography of Bing Crosby stringing together the following short subjects:

- "I Surrender Dear" (1931)
- "One More Chance" (1931)
- "Billboard Girl" (1931)
- "Dream House" (1932)

== Cast ==
- Bing Crosby as himself (archive footage)
- Luis Alberni as The Marquis, from I Surrender Dear (archive footage)
- Bud Pollard as himself (Host / Narrator)
- Ann Christy as Betty Brooks, from Dream House (archive footage)
- Patsy O'Leary as Ethel Bangs, from One More Chance / Mrs. McCullough, from I Surrender Dear (archive footage)
- George C. Pearce as Mary's Father, from Billboard Girl (archive footage)
- Arthur Stone as Ethel's Uncle Joe, from One More Chance / Jerry, Bing's friend from I Surrender Dear (archive footage)
- Dick Stewart as Jerry, Bing's Chum from Billboard Girl (archive footage)
- Lincoln Stedman as Whitman, Mary's Fiancé, from Billboard Girl (archive footage)
- Kathrin Clare Ward as Mother Brooks, from Dream House (archive footage)
- James Eagles as Mary's Brother, from Billboard Girl (archive footage)
- Matty Kemp as Percy Howard, Bing's Rival, from One More Chance (archive footage)
- Eddie Phillips as Reginald Duncan, from Dream House (archive footage)
- Marion Sayers as Peggy, Bing's Sweetheart, from I Surrender Dear (archive footage)
- Julia Griffith as Ethel's Mother, Bing's Future Mother-in-Law, from I Surrender Dear (archive footage)
- George Gray as George Dobbs, from I Surrender Dear (archive footage)
- Vernon Dent as A Film Director, from Dream House (archive footage)
- Alice Adair as Ethel Dobbs, from I Surrender Dear (archive footage)
- Marjorie Kane as Mary Malone, from Billboard Girl (archive footage)

== Soundtrack ==
All sung by Bing Crosby

From "I Surrender Dear"

- "I Surrender Dear"
- "At Your Command"
- "Out of Nowhere”
- "A Little Bit of Heaven" (Ernest R. Ball / J. Keirn Brennan)

From "One More Chance"

- "Just One More Chance"
- "Wrap Your Troubles in Dreams"
- "I Surrender Dear" (parody)
- I'd Climb the Highest Mountain

From "Dream House"

- "Dream House" (Earle Foxe / Lynn F. Cowan)
- "It Must Be True" (Harry Barris / Gus Arnheim / Gordon Clifford)
- "When I Take My Sugar to Tea” (Sammy Fain / Irving Kahal / Pierre Norman)

From "Billboard Girl"

- "Were You Sincere?" (Vincent Rose / Jack Meskill)
- "For You”
