= Bing Crosby filmography =

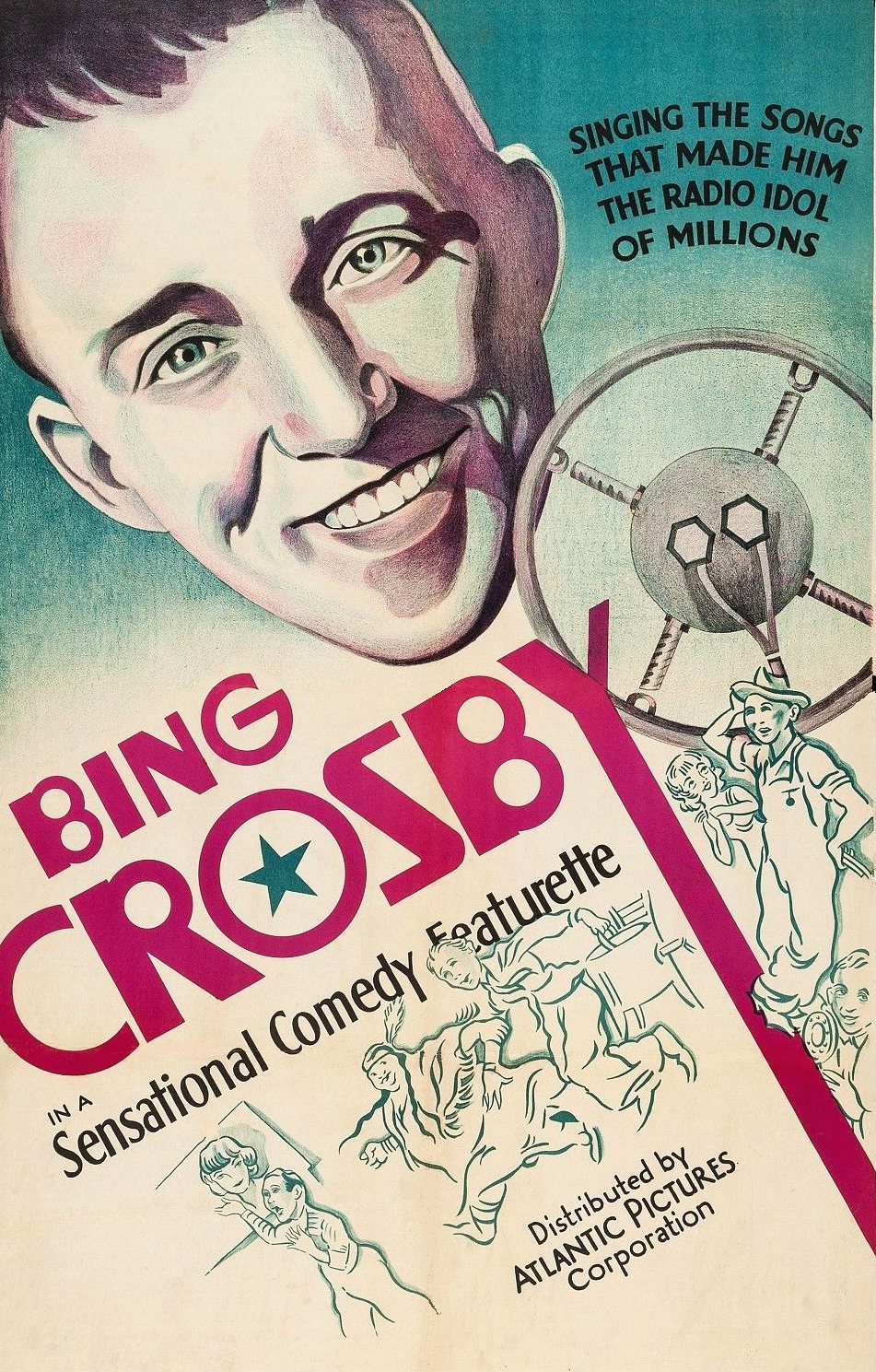
Poster for Sing, Bing, Sing (1933)

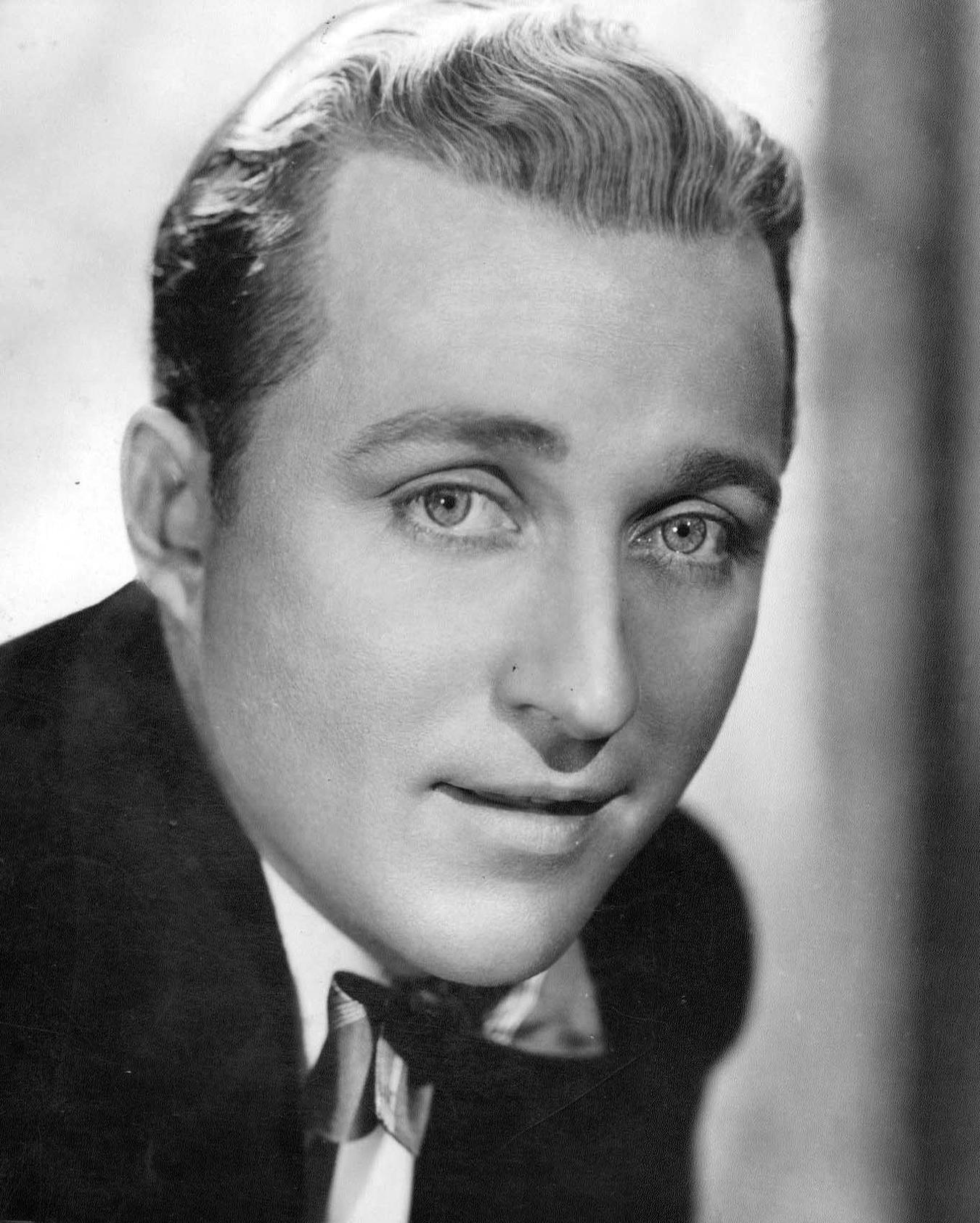
Bing Crosby in the 1930s

This is a filmography for the American singer and actor Bing Crosby.

== Films ==
Year	Title	Role	Notes
1930	King of Jazz	Vocalist	Member of "The Rhythm Boys"
1930	Reaching for the Moon	Bing	Short guest appearance to sing one song
1931	Confessions of a Co-Ed	Vocalist	Member of The Rhythm Boys
1931	I Surrender Dear	Himself	Two-reeler; plays himself; directed by Mack Sennett
1931	One More Chance	Bing Bangs	Two-reeler; directed by Mack Sennett
1932	Dream House	Bing Fawcett	Two-reeler; produced by Mack Sennett
1932	Billboard Girl	Himself	Two-reeler; produced by Mack Sennett
1932	The Big Broadcast	Himself	His first starring role in a full-length film.
1933	Blue of the Night	Himself / Jack Smith	Two-reeler; produced by Mack Sennett
1933	Sing, Bing, Sing	Himself	Two-reeler; produced by Mack Sennett
1933	College Humor	Professor Frederick Danvers	
1933	Too Much Harmony	Eddie Bronson	
1933	Please	Himself / Howard Jones	Two-reeler; produced and directed by Arvid E. Gillstrom
1933	Going Hollywood	Bill Williams	
1934	Just an Echo	Himself	Two-reeler; produced and directed by Arvid E. Gillstrom
1934	We're Not Dressing	Stephen Jones	
1934	She Loves Me Not	Paul Lawton	
1934	Here Is My Heart	J. (Jasper) Paul Jones	
1935	Mississippi	Tom Grayson	
1935	Two for Tonight	Gilbert Gordon	
1935	The Big Broadcast of 1936	Himself	cameo
1936	Anything Goes	Billy Crocker	
1936	Rhythm on the Range	Jeff Larabee	
1936	Pennies from Heaven	Larry Poole	
1937	Waikiki Wedding	Tony Marvin	
1937	Double or Nothing	'Lefty' Boylan	
1938	Doctor Rhythm	Dr. Bill Remsen	
1938	Sing You Sinners	Joe Beebe	
1939	Paris Honeymoon	'Lucky' Lawton	
1939	East Side of Heaven	Denny Martin	
1939	The Star Maker	Larry Earl	
1940	Road to Singapore	Joshua 'Josh' Mallon V	
1940	If I Had My Way	Buzz Blackwell	
1940	Rhythm on the River	Bob Sommers	
1941	Road to Zanzibar	Chuck Reardon	
1941	Birth of the Blues	Jeff Lambert	
1942	My Favorite Blonde	Man outside union hall	Uncredited cameo appearance
1942	Road to Morocco	Jeff Peters	
1942	Holiday Inn	Jim Hardy	
1942	Star Spangled Rhythm	himself	
1943	They Got Me Covered	Music box	Voice only, uncredited
1943	Dixie	Daniel Decatur Emmett	
1944	Going My Way	Father Chuck O'Malley	Academy Award for Best Actor
1944	The Princess and the Pirate	Commoner on King's ship	Uncredited cameo appearance
1944	Here Come the Waves	Johnny Cabot	
1945	Out of This World		Singing voice for Eddie Bracken
1945	The Bells of St. Mary's	Father Chuck O'Malley	Nominated—Academy Award for Best Actor
1945	Duffy's Tavern	Himself	
1946	Road to Utopia	Duke Johnson/Junior Hooton	
1946	Blue Skies	Johnny Adams	
1947	My Favorite Brunette	Harry	Uncredited cameo appearance
1947	Welcome Stranger	Dr. James 'Jim' Pearson	
1947	Variety Girl	Himself	One of several featured performers in musical sequences
1947	Road to Rio	Scat Sweeney	
1948	The Emperor Waltz	Virgil Smith	
1949	A Connecticut Yankee in King Arthur's Court	Hank Martin	
1949	Top o' the Morning	Joe Mulqueen	
1949	The Adventures of Ichabod and Mr. Toad	Voice Role-Narrator, Ichabod, Brom Bones	"The Legend of Sleepy Hollow" segment
1950	Riding High	Dan Brooks	
1950	Mr. Music	Paul Merrick	
1951	Here Comes the Groom	Peter 'Pete' Garvey	Nominated—Golden Globe Award for Best Actor – Motion Picture Musical or Comedy
1951	Angels in the Outfield	Himself	Uncredited cameo appearance
1952	The Greatest Show on Earth		Uncredited cameo appearance
1952	Son of Paleface		Uncredited cameo appearance
1952	Just for You	Jordan Blake	
1952	Road to Bali	George Cochran	
1953	Scared Stiff		Uncredited cameo appearance
1953	Little Boy Lost	Bill Wainwright	
1954	White Christmas	Bob Wallace	
1954	The Country Girl	Frank Elgin	National Board of Review Award for Best Actor; Nominated—Academy Award for Best Actor
1956	Anything Goes	Bill Benson	
1956	High Society	C. K. Dexter-Haven	
1957	The Joker Is Wild		Uncredited vocal performance singing "June in January"
1957	Man on Fire	Earl Carleton	
1959	Alias Jesse James		Uncredited cameo appearance
1959	Say One for Me	Father Conroy	
1960	Let's Make Love	Himself	Uncredited cameo appearance
1960	High Time	Harvey Howard	
1960	Pepe	Himself	Uncredited cameo appearance
1962	The Road to Hong Kong	Harry Turner	
1964	Robin and the 7 Hoods	Allen A. Dale	With Frank Sinatra
1966	Stagecoach	Doc Josiah Boone	Color remake of John Ford's 1939 B&W version
1971	Dr. Cook's Garden	Dr. Leonard Cook	Television film
1972	Cancel My Reservation	Himself	Uncredited cameo performance
1974	That's Entertainment!	Himself as featured presenter	

=== Box office ranking ===
Crosby was frequently voted among the leading box office stars in a poll of exhibitors. See Top Ten Money Making Stars Poll

- 1933 - 14th (US)
- 1934 - 7th (US)
- 1935 - 12th (US)
- 1936 - 22nd (US)
- 1937 - 4th (US)
- 1938 - 13th (US)
- 1939 - 11th (US)
- 1940 - 7th (US)
- 1943 - 4th (US)
- 1944 - 1st (US)
- 1945 - 1st (US)
- 1946 - 1st (US)
- 1947 - 1st (US)
- 1948 - 1st (US)
- 1949 - 2nd (US)
- 1950 - 3rd (US)
- 1951 - 5th (US)
- 1952 - 4th (US)
- 1953 - 5th (US)
- 1954 - 8th (US)
- 1955 - 13th (US)
- 1956 - 20th (US)

=== Top-ten films of their year ===
USA
- Road to Singapore (placed in top ten) (1940)
- Road to Zanzibar (placed in top ten) (1941)
- Holiday Inn (No. 8) (1942)
- Going My Way (No. 1) (1944)
- The Bells of St. Mary's (No. 1) (1946)
- Blue Skies (No. 3) (1946)
- Road to Utopia (No. 4) (1946)
- Welcome Stranger ( No. 7) (1947)
- Road to Rio (No. 1) (1948)
- The Emperor Waltz (No. 7) (1948)
- White Christmas (No. 1) (1954)
- The Country Girl (No. 6) (1955)
- High Society (No. 4) (1956)

UK

- Holiday Inn (No. 5) (1942)
- Going My Way (No. 4) (1944)
- The Bells of St. Mary's (No. 2) (1946)
- Blue Skies (placed in top ten) (1947)
- Road to Bali (No. 2) (1953)
- White Christmas (No. 2) (1955)
- High Society (No. 1) (1957)
- The Road to Hong Kong (placed in top ten) (1962)

The source of the information is Variety for the USA results and Kinematograph Weekly for the UK.

== Other short subjects ==
- Two Plus Fours (1930)
- Hollywood on Parade (1932)
- Hollywood on Parade No. 11 (1933)
- Hollywood on Parade No. A-9 (1933)
- Star Night at the Cocoanut Grove (1934)
- Screen Snapshots Series 16, No. 5 (1937)
- Hollywood Handicap (1938)
- Screen Snapshots Series 18, No. 4 (1938)
- Screen Snapshots Series 18, No. 9 (1939)
- Screen Snapshots: Hollywood Recreations (1940)
- Swing with Bing (1940)
- Angels of Mercy (1941)
- Meet the Stars #6: Stars at Play (1941)
- Show Business at War (1943)
- Don't Hook Now (1943)
- Road to Victory (1944)
- The All-Star Bond Rally (1945)
- Hollywood Victory Caravan (1945)
- Screen Snapshots: Hollywood Celebrations (1945)
- Screen Snapshots: Famous Fathers and Sons (1946)
- Screen Snapshots: Hollywood's Happy Homes (1949)
- Alberta Vacation (1950)
- You Can Change the World (1951)
- Crusade for Prayer (1952)
- Screen Snapshots: Hollywood Mothers and Fathers (1955)
- Showdown at Ulcer Gulch (1956) (Bing and Bob Hope walk past each other with umbrellas)
- Bing Presents Oreste (1956)
- The Heart of Show Business (1957)
- Just One More Time (1974)

== Television ==
- The Bing Crosby Show (1954)
- High Tor (1956)
- The Edsel Show (1957)
- Bing Crosby in London (1961)
- The Bing Crosby Show (ABC, 1964–1965)
- A Little Bit of Irish (1967)
- Goldilocks (1970)
- Dr. Cook's Garden (1971)
- Bing Crosby and Fred Astaire: A Couple of Song and Dance Men (1975)

== Songs nominated for Academy Award ==
From 1934, when the first Oscar was awarded for "Best Song", until 1960, Bing Crosby introduced more nominated songs than any other singer. His fourteen nominations produced four Oscar winners, a record that has never been matched.

Year	Title	Film	Result
1934	"Love in Bloom"	She Loves Me Not	Nominated
1936	"Pennies from Heaven"	Pennies from Heaven	Nominated
1937	"Sweet Leilani"	Waikiki Wedding	Won
1940	"Only Forever"	Rhythm on the River	Nominated
1942	"White Christmas"	Holiday Inn	Won
1944	"Swinging on a Star"	Going My Way	Won
1945	"Ac-Cent-Tchu-Ate the Positive"	Here Come the Waves	Nominated
1945	"Aren't You Glad You're You"	The Bells of St. Mary's	Nominated
1946	"You Keep Coming Back Like a Song"	Blue Skies	Nominated
1951	"In the Cool, Cool, Cool of the Evening"	Here Comes the Groom	Won
1952	"Zing a Little Zong"	Just for You	Nominated
1954	"Count Your Blessings (Instead of Sheep)"	White Christmas	Nominated
1956	"True Love"	High Society	Nominated
1960	"The Second Time Around"	High Time	Nominated

== Soundtrack appearances ==
- Richard Hamilton (1969) – This is an Arts Council of Great Britain sponsored twenty five minute short. It is devoted to the works of artist Richard Hamilton. The only song heard in the short is "White Christmas". Bing Crosby's Decca recording is used to illustrate Hamilton's painting I'm Dreaming of a White Christmas. The painting is of Bing in negative and the effects of color reversal create a snow scene effect to the Crosby features.
- Paper Moon (1973) – Peter Bogdanovich's film relies solely on commercial recordings and radio programs to provide background music for this film which is set in the US in the 1930s. Crosby's recording of "Just One More Chance" is featured.
- Brother, Can You Spare a Dime (1975) – David Puttnam was involved in this 109 minute compilation of 1930s film footage. As well as singing the title song we hear Bing's recording of "Where the Blue of the Night (Meets the Gold of the Day)." The film's closing credits wrongly title the latter song "When the Blue...".
- The Man Who Fell to Earth (1976) – In this Crosby can be heard singing "True Love". At the film's end, Candy Clark, playing David Bowie's girlfriend, goes to Bowie's apartment in a Father Christmas outfit. As the two move around the apartment, part of the Capitol recording of "True Love" is heard on the soundtrack.
- Tracks (1977) – Director Henry Jaglom makes use of two of Crosby's American Decca recordings: "These Foolish Things" and "(There'll Be a) Hot Time in the Town of Berlin", the latter performed with The Andrews Sisters.
- F.I.S.T. (1978) – In the early part of the film the U.S. Decca recording of "Santa Claus Is Coming to Town" by Crosby and the Andrews Sisters is heard on the soundtrack. The song is playing on the radio in a scene where a Chicago businessman is visited during the Christmas holiday by union representatives.
- The Brink's Job (1978) – In an early scene set in Boston, the American Decca recording of "Ac-Cent-Tchu-Ate the Positive" by Bing Crosby and the Andrews Sisters is heard. This serves to indicate the era without resorting to a caption or explanatory dialogue. At the end of the film the same recording is heard as the gang of robbers depicted in the film ascend the courthouse steps for a trial prior to imprisonment.
- Pennies From Heaven (1981) – This version uses recordings from the 1930s to advance the story-line. The film's setting is the thirties with the actors miming to 78s from that decade. Crosby's contribution is "Did You Ever See a Dream Walking?".
- Frances (1982) – Bing Crosby is heard singing "Love Is So Terrific" as background music in this screen biography of Crosby's one time leading lady Frances Farmer. This song is taken from the Philco Radio Time broadcast of March 31, 1948.
- Some Kind of Hero (1982) – Towards the end of the main character's imprisonment, the public address system broadcasts the Bing and Carol Richards Decca recording of "Silver Bells".
- A Christmas Story (1983) – Crosby's Decca 78s are used to give a seasonal early 1940s atmosphere to the film by the playing of "Jingle Bells", "It's Beginning to Look a Lot Like Christmas" and "Santa Claus Is Coming to Town".
- Racing with the Moon (1984) – Popular songs of the era are played on the soundtrack including Crosby's Decca recording of "Moonlight Becomes You".
- A Nightmare on Elm Street 2: Freddy's Revenge (1985) – Crosby's recording of "Did You Ever See a Dream Walking?" is heard on the soundtrack of this American horror film about a teenager suffering from nightmares.
- One Magic Christmas (1985) – Bing's Decca recording of "I'll Be Home for Christmas" adds poignancy to a scene where the characters have a heart to heart talk in their kitchen.
- Tough Guys (1986) – Crosby sings "Don't Get Around Much Anymore" on the soundtrack. It is Crosby's 1977 recording made for a Concord CD, although Burt Lancaster is shown placing a 78 on the record turntable.
- Radio Days (1987) – Woody Allen's affectionate tribute to the golden days of American radio crams loads of music from the 1930s and 1940s onto the nostalgia provoking soundtrack. Bing Crosby's contribution is part of the Decca recording of "Pistol Packin' Mama" sung with the Andrews Sisters.
- Someone to Love (1987) – Director Henry Jaglom selected Bing's Decca recording of "Long Ago (and Far Away)" to help capture the mood of one of the film's introspective moments.
- Lady in White (1988) – Bing sings "Did You Ever See a Dream Walking?" as the film's main character, young Frankie, played by Lukas Haas, descends the stairs and sees the ghost of a murdered girl. The song has a significant part to play in the film's plot. As the end credits roll the Crosby vocal is reprised, followed by the lyrics being picked up by a childish voice intended to be that of the murdered girl.
- Christmas in Tattertown (1988) – This thirty minute cartoon was first shown on television in the US in 1988. The plot concerns a doll called Muffet who hates Christmas and the sentiment surrounding the season of goodwill. She is supported in her beliefs by a spider and a fly. When Debbie, the doll's owner, plays Crosby's recording of "White Christmas" both spider and fly are reduced to tears.
- When Harry Met Sally... (1989) – Crosby sings "Have Yourself a Merry Little Christmas" as the story moves towards a happy conclusion.
- National Lampoon's Christmas Vacation (1989) – The Hawaiian song "Mele Kalikimaka", sung by Crosby and the Andrews Sisters is used to illustrate a dream sequence. A further nod to the Crosby influence on Christmas comes at Griswold's darkest hour when the family guests pack to leave the disaster stricken house. Chevy Chase bars their way, grits his teeth and says, "Nobody leaves. This is going to be the happiest Christmas since Bing Crosby tap danced with Danny Kaye."
- The Road Home (1989) – Crosby's 1943 recording of "San Fernando Valley" is incongruously included on the soundtrack where recordings by the likes of Happy Mondays, Raheem, The Pogues and The Cure predominate.
- Avalon (1990) – Bing's soundtrack contribution is "Silver Bells" which he duets with Carol Richards.
- Henry & June (1990) – Director Philip Kaufman decided to use French and American recordings of the period alongside an orchestral score of 1930s classical compositions. One of his contemporary selections was Crosby's recording of "I Found a Million Dollar Baby".
- Hudson Hawk (1991) This American comedy thriller was the first major financial disaster of the 1990s as far as Hollywood was concerned. Bing's recording of "Swinging on a Star" plays a major part in the plot. Bruce Willis as the Hudson Hawk of the title plans to steal a Leonardo da Vinci from a New York auction house. He estimates the heist will take the length of time it takes to sing "Swinging on a Star".
- Oscar (1991) – In a scene in the first reel, Sylvester Stallone's daughter (Ornella Muti) is showing her rebellious side. She is in retreat in her bedroom smoking and listening to Crosby's 1932 recording of "Sweet Georgia Brown".
- November Days (1991) – Parts of Bing's May 1942 recording of "Song of Freedom" are used throughout the film. Anti-Semitism is an issue explored in the film and Crosby's vocal gives added poignancy in a sequence when a Neo-Nazi is interviewed.
- Grumpy Old Men (1993) – This Warner Bros. film includes Crosby's Warner Bros. released recording of "Winter Wonderland".
- Trapped in Paradise (1994) – There is a scene in the town's bank where customers are conducting business while Bing Crosby's 1963 recording of "Do You Hear What I Hear?" is playing over the public address system.
- The Troubles We've Seen (1994) – Crosby is heard singing "White Christmas" to film footage of sledding in the Bosnian mountains.
- Things to Do in Denver When You're Dead (1995) – The American Decca recording of "Ac-Cent-Tchu-Ate the Positive" by Bing and the Andrews Sisters accompanies a scene after Andy Garcia, the film's leading man, is the subject of a vicious beating.
- Mother Night (1996) – The Crosby Decca recording of "White Christmas" is played unedited over the credit titles at the film's beginning. Then, forty minutes into the action, there is a sequence set in New York in 1960. "White Christmas" is heard on the soundtrack. A display of Decca 78s is shown as the Nick Nolte character explains he has 26 copies of the Crosby disc which he obtained via the U.S. Armed Forces.
- L.A. Confidential (1997) – About twenty minutes into the film there is a scene in a liquor store. Crosby and the Andrews Sisters are heard singing "Mele Kalikimaka" when Kim Basinger and a cop visit the store.
- The Locusts (1997) – The film's songs are almost all late 1950s recordings with the notable exception of Crosby's "Did You Ever See a Dream Walking?". That song starts up as background music some thirteen minutes into the story.
- The Myth of Fingerprints (1997) – A snatch of Crosby's recording of "Don't Be That Way" and a lengthy excerpt from "Adeste Fideles" are heard on the soundtrack. The latter song is used two-thirds through the story when actors Roy Scheider and Blythe Danner are preparing a turkey for the oven.
- Enemy of the State (1998) – Bing's 1947 Decca recording of "They Can't Take That Away from Me" is played over the credits.
- Forever Hollywood (1999) – This fifty minute compilation ends with Crosby singing "Going Hollywood" from the film of the same name.
- Snow Falling on Cedars (2000) – Bing's Decca recording of "Would You" plays in the background of a flashback scene.
- Bicentennial Man (2000) – In one scene, Robin Williams is seen repairing a phonograph. The 78 that is played is Crosby's "I Found a Million Dollar Baby".
- Hollywood Ending (2001) – This Woody Allen film makes use of Bing's recording of "Going Hollywood".
- Catch Me If You Can (2002) – Crosby and the Andrews Sisters are heard singing "Mele Kalikimaka".
- Bad Santa (2003) – About twenty minutes before the end of the film, there is a scene which takes place on Christmas Eve. Prior to carrying out another robbery Billy Bob Thornton is assisting in dressing a Christmas tree and hanging Christmas stockings. The film's soundtrack plays Bing singing "Have Yourself a Merry Little Christmas". Almost all of the 1962 Warner Bros. recording is used.
- Fahrenheit 9/11 (2004) – Three-quarters of the way into the film there is footage of U.S. military stationed in Iraq. It is just before Christmas, presumably in the year 2002. Crosby and the Andrews Sisters can be heard singing "Here Comes Santa Claus" on two occasions during the sequence.
- The Polar Express (2004) – Both "White Christmas" and "Here Comes Santa Claus" can be heard on the soundtrack.
- The Aviator (2004) – Bing Crosby is heard twice on the film's soundtrack during the drama's first half. "Thanks" is played shortly after the sequence depicting the premiere of the film "Wings" and "Some of These Days" is featured when Howard Hughes, played by Leonardo DiCaprio, visits the home of Katharine Hepburn (Cate Blanchett).
- Run Fatboy Run (2007) – Crosby's recording of "Nice Work If You Can Get It" with accompaniment by Buddy Bregman can be heard over the pre-credit sequence of this British comedy.
- Four Christmases (2008). – The first song heard in this seasonal comedy is "White Christmas" sung by Bing. It is heavily overdubbed and is referred to as "the Declan mix" when acknowledging that it is licensed from the current owners of Crosby's Decca catalog.
- Nanny McPhee and the Big Bang (2010) – The soundtrack features Crosby singing "The Best Things in Life Are Free". It is the first use in a film of a Ken Barnes session recording. Bing was in London to record the song in 1975.
- The Music Never Stopped (2011) – Bing is heard singing the version of "Young at Heart" recorded for the GE show on the soundtrack.
- Nativity 2: Danger in the Manger (2012) A worried new teacher has to juggle a pregnant wife and a class of children on a road trip to the National 'Song for Christmas' Competition. Crosby and The Andrews Sisters can be heard singing "Jingle Bells".
- Serena (2014) – Around two-thirds through the film the characters attend a business dinner and The Rhythm Boys recording of "There Ain't No Sweet Man That's Worth the Salt of My Tears" starts up. This February 8, 1928 recording with the Paul Whiteman Orchestra is the earliest instance of the Crosby voice being used on screen.
- Get Santa (2014) A father and son team up to save Christmas once they discover Santa Claus sleeping in their garage after crashing his sleigh and finding himself on the run from the police. "Here Comes Santa Claus", "Deck the Halls", "Away in a Manger" and "I Saw Three Ships" are all heard.
- Krampus (2015) A boy who has a bad Christmas ends up accidentally summoning a festive demon to his family home. The seasonal theme inevitably means that Bing Crosby will be included on the soundtrack and he pops up with "I'll Be Home for Christmas" and "Santa Claus Is Coming to Town".
- Brooklyn (2015) – A brief snatch of "Zing a Little Zong" is played over Coney Island's public address system. This is the version featuring Crosby duetting with Rosemary Clooney and is taken from the Chesterfield broadcast of June 11, 1952. Jasmine Records are credited with making the recording available.
- Deadpool (2016) A fast-talking mercenary, played by Ryan Reynolds, with a morbid sense of humour is subjected to a rogue experiment that leaves him with accelerated healing powers and a quest for revenge. The Crosby recording of "I'll Be Home for Christmas" is heard.
- Moon Rock City (2017) In the future, a band of misfits uncover the saga of an infamous rock star. The Crosby version of "Brother, Can You Spare a Dime?" is featured.
- Breathe (2017) This tells the story of Robin Cavendish who becomes paralyzed from the neck down by polio at age 28. The film opens and closes with the duet by Bing and Grace Kelly of "True Love" from "High Society."
- Sonja: The White Swan (2018) - the story of Sonja Henie, one of the world's greatest athletes and the inventor of modern figure skating, who decides to go to Hollywood in 1936 to become a movie star. Bing and The Bell Sisters are heard singing "Wait Till the Sun Shines, Nellie".
- Shazam (2019) - a superhero film. The opening scene is set in 1974 at Christmas and several passengers in a car are talking with the car radio playing in the background. The music being played is Bing singing "Do You Hear What I Hear?".
- A Rainy Day in New York (2019) - A young couple arrives in New York for a weekend where they are met with bad weather and a series of adventures. Bing is heard singing “I Got Lucky in the Rain” over the opening credits of this Woody Allen film.
- Nomadland (2020) - Starring Frances McDormand, this Oscar winning film depicts the day-to-day existence of a number of Americans who have chosen itinerant lives housed in all manner of camper vans. Bing’s “White Christmas” can be heard in the background during a scene in a supermarket.
- Licorice Pizza (2021) - A coming-of-age comedy-drama film starring Alana Haim, Cooper Hoffman, Sean Penn, Tom Waits, Bradley Cooper, and Benny Safdie. Bing and the Andrews Sisters version of “Ac-Cent-Tchu-Ate the Positive” is heard on the soundtrack.
- Glorious (2022) - A horror thriller film starring Ryan Kwanten and J. K. Simmons. Bing and the Bell Sisters are heard singing "Wait Till the Sun Shines, Nellie" at the beginning.
- Asteroid City (2023) - a comedy-drama film directed by Wes Anderson. Set in 1955, many songs from the era are heard including Bing's version of “The Streets of Laredo”.

The text of this section entitled 'Crosby Voice' is available for modification and reuse under the terms of the Creative Commons Attribution-Sharealike 3.0 Unported License and the GNU Free Documentation License.
