= Keys of the Righteous =

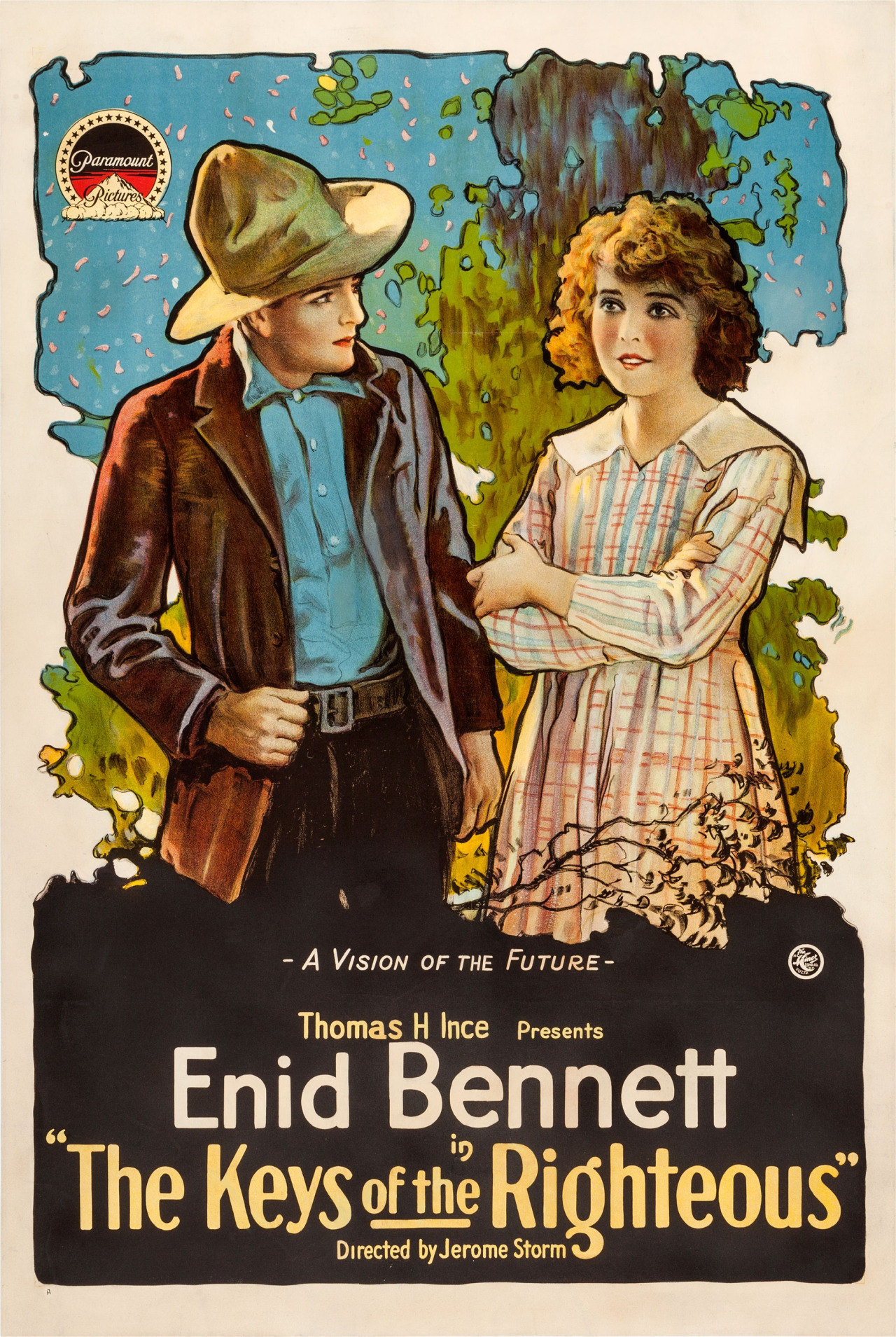
- Film poster
- Directed by: Jerome Storm
- Screenplay by: C. Gardner Sullivan
- Produced by: Thomas H. Ince
- Starring: Enid Bennett; Earle Rodney; George Nichols; Josef Swickard; Karl Formes; Gertrude Claire
- Cinematography: Charles J. Stumar
- Production company: Thomas H. Ince Corporation
- Distributed by: Paramount Pictures
- Release date: February 18, 1918
- Running time: 50 minutes
- Country: United States
- Language: Silent (English intertitles)

Keys of the Righteous is a surviving 1918 American silent drama film directed by Jerome Storm and written by C. Gardner Sullivan. The film stars Enid Bennett, Earle Rodney, George Nichols, Josef Swickard, Karl Formes, and Gertrude Claire. The film was released on February 18, 1918, by Paramount Pictures.

== Cast ==
- Enid Bennett as Mary Manning
- Earle Rodney as Tom Gale (credited as Earl Rodney)
- George Nichols as Peter Manning
- Josef Swickard as Paul Manning
- Karl Formes as John Manning (credited as Carl Formes)
- Gertrude Claire as Sarah Ann Watts
- Lydia Knott as Mrs. Manning
- Melbourne MacDowell as Judge Michael Burke

== Preservation status ==
A print exists in the Library of Congress collection.

== Reception ==
Like many American films of the time, Keys of the Righteous was subject to cuts by city and state film censorship boards. For example, the Chicago Board of Censors cut, in Reel 4, the striking of man on head with cane, closeup of two men exchanging glances regarding young woman, all dance hall scenes up to time young woman is seen at table with father, man with arm around young woman at table in cabaret, stout woman talking to young woman at table with father, woman soliciting man at door of saloon, the intertitle "Leave me alone, I'm broke", Reel 5, two intertitles "A charge which if proven" etc. and "If you father was looking for you there" etc., and all scenes of woman derelicts before judge at bar.

The Kansas Board of Review required the removal of two completely different scenes. In reel 3, an intertitle saying "You damned drunken liar, get out of this house." was eliminated, and so was a closeup of a drunken woman in reel 5.
