= The Loud Mouth =

1932 film

- Directed by: Del Lord
- Produced by: Mack Sennett
- Starring: Matt McHugh; Marjorie Kane
- Cinematography: George Unholz
- Release date: June 17, 1932
- Running time: 20 minutes
- Country: United States
- Language: English

The Loud Mouth is a 1932 American pre-Code short comedy film directed by Del Lord. It was nominated for an Academy Award in 1932 for Best Short Subject (Comedy).

== Cast ==
- Matt McHugh as Loud Mouth
- Marjorie Kane as Edith
- Franklin Pangborn as Freddie
- Ray Cooke as Swat Butler of Blue Sox
- Julia Griffith
- Fred Kelsey as Max, Manager of Blue Sox
