= Earle Rodney =

Canadian screenwriter

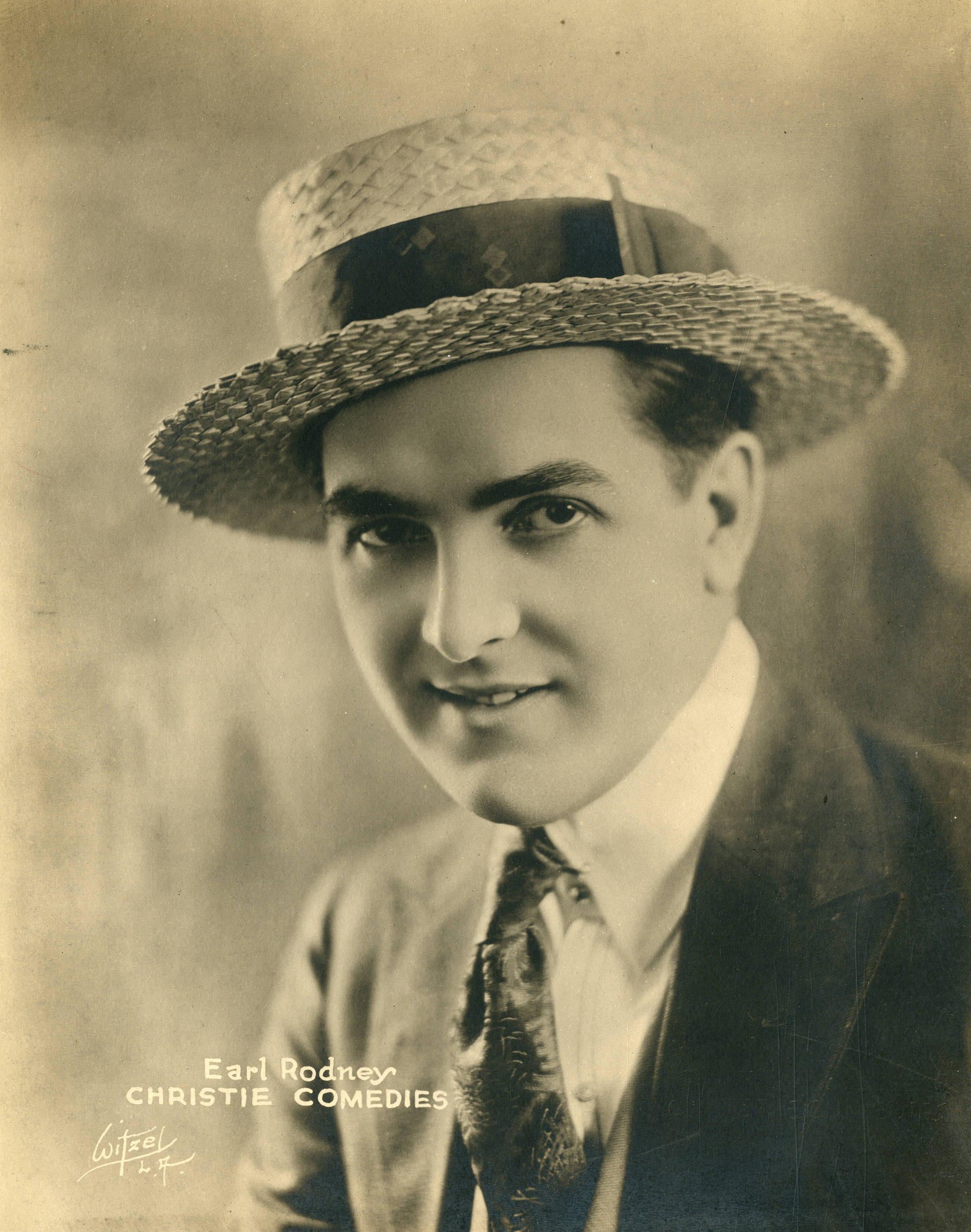
- Rodney in 1924
- Born: Earle Rodney Hupp; 4 June 1888; Toronto, Ontario, Canada
- Died: 16 December 1932 (aged 44); Los Angeles, California, US
- Occupations: Screenwriter, actor, film director
- Years active: 1915–1932

Earle Rodney (né Earle Rodney Hupp; 4 June 1888 – 16 December 1932) was a Canadian screenwriter, actor, and film director. He wrote for more than 100 films between 1926 and 1947 (posthumous credit). He also acted in 69 films between 1915 and 1929, often paired with Dorothy Devore. He was born in Toronto, and died in Los Angeles, California from pneumonia.

== Selected filmography ==
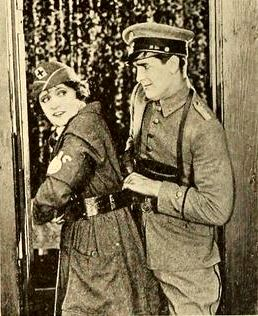
Alice Lake and Earle Rodney in Shades of Shakespeare (1919)

- The Nick of Time Baby (1916 – acted)
- Whose Baby? (1917 – acted)
- Keys of the Righteous (1918 – acted)
- Naughty, Naughty (1918)
- The Biggest Show on Earth (1918)
- The City of Tears (1918)
- Know Thy Wife (1918)
- A Roman Scandal (1919 – acted)
- Her Bridal Nightmare (1920 – acted)
- Crazy to Act (1927 – director)
- Heart Trouble (1928 – writer)
- The Campus Vamp (1928 – writer)
- Girl Crazy (1929 – acted)
- The Old Barn (1929 – writer)
- The Bees' Buzz (1929 – writer)
- Midnight Daddies (1930, writer)
- Ghost Parade (1931 – writer)
- I Surrender Dear (1931 – writer)
- One More Chance (1931 – writer)
- Dream House (1931 – writer)
- Billboard Girl (1932 – writer)
- The Road to Hollywood (1947 – material)
