= The Runaway (1926 film) =

1926 film

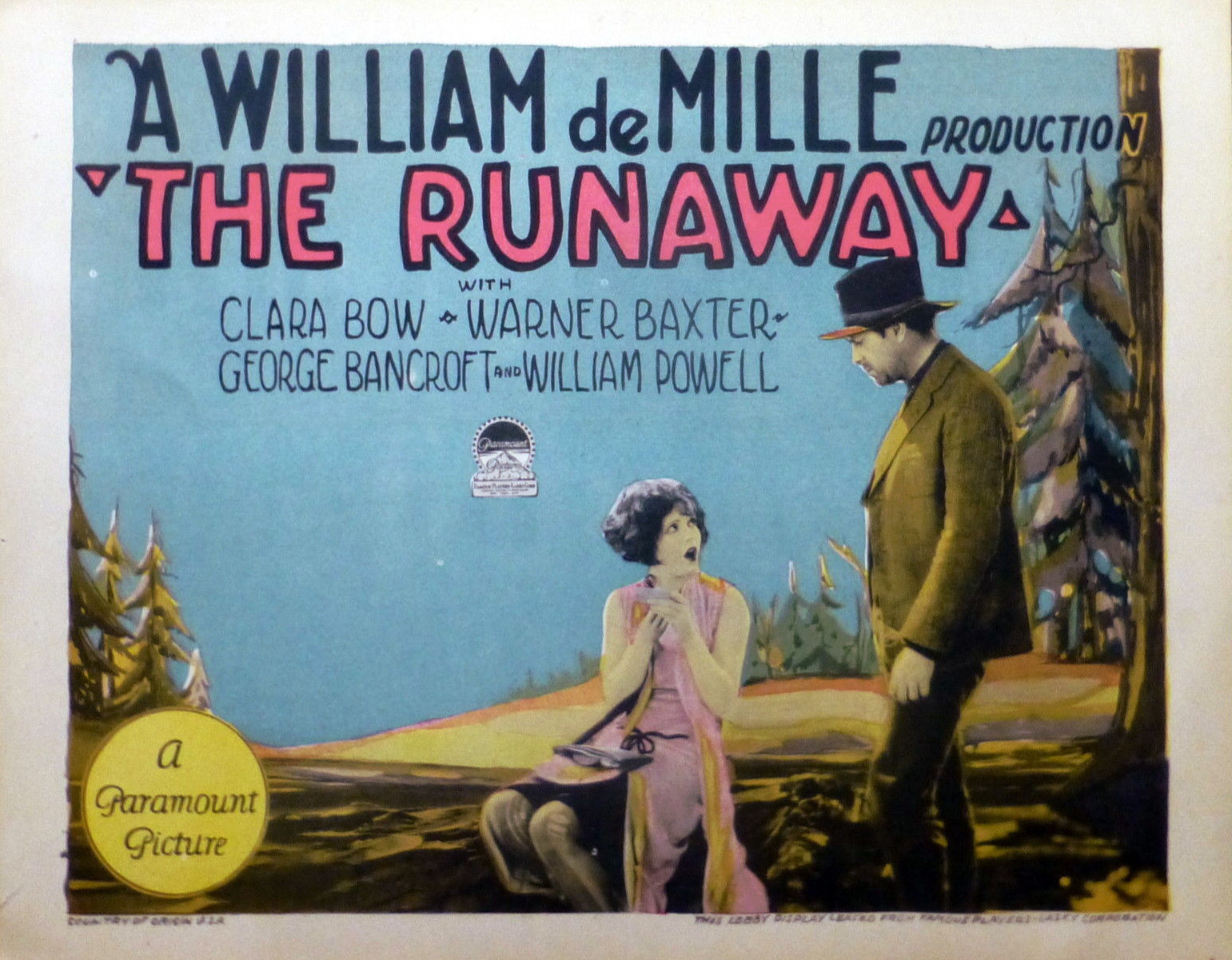
- Lobby card
- Directed by: William C. deMille
- Written by: Albert Shelby Le Vino
- Based on: The Flight to the Hills by Charles Neville Buck
- Produced by: Famous Players–Lasky
- Starring: Clara Bow; Warner Baxter; William Powell; George Bancroft
- Cinematography: Charles P. Boyle
- Distributed by: Paramount Pictures
- Release date: April 5, 1926
- Running time: 69 minutes
- Country: United States
- Language: Silent (English intertitles)

The Runaway is a 1926 American silent melodrama film directed by William C. deMille and starring Clara Bow, Warner Baxter, William Powell, and George Bancroft. The cinematography was by Charles P. Boyle. The plot involves a movie star who erroneously assumes that she has murdered someone and flees to Kentucky.

== Plot ==
Cynthia Meade, a wild, high spirited New York movie actress, meets Jack Harrison, a wealthy young New Yorker, in a Tennessee city. She is hoping he will be able to help her with her movie career, but he demands a relationship in return. A stray bullet comes through the window and he is dangerously wounded while with Cynthia. Realizes how hard it will be to prove her innocence, Cynthea flees, thinking Harrison dead. On a lonely road, Cynthia, half hysterical and nearly exhausted, appeals to Wade Murrell, a young mountaineer on the way back to his Kentucky home. He believes that she is running away from danger and takes her with him. Arriving at his house, he is disgusted when he learns she cannot cook or do any of the daily chores of hill women. However, she finally wins the confidence of his mother. Several weeks later, Harrison, the supposedly dead man, appears, saying he is seeking the person who shot and left him for dead. Murrell does not know at first that Cynthia is the person Harrison suspects, and the two become good friends. The presence of a “painted woman,” as the hill people call Cynthia, arouses a terrific antipathy toward Murrell, and he narrowly avoids being killed by one of their number. In the end, Cynthia is forced to choose between her old and new lover, but not before the three have passed through many crises.

== Cast ==
- Clara Bow as Cynthia Meade
- Warner Baxter as Wade Murrell
- William Powell as Jack Harrison
- George Bancroft as Lesher Skidmore
- Edythe Chapman as Mrs. Murrell

== Preservation ==
With no prints of The Runaway located in any film archives, it is a lost film. A 34-second fragment of the film showcasing Clara Bow in the horse ride sequence with the mountaineer has survived.
