= Charles P. Boyle =

American cinematographer (1892–1968)

- Born: June 26, 1892; Chicago, Illinois
- Died: May 28, 1968 (aged 75); Los Angeles, California
- Occupation: Cinematographer
- Years active: 1925–1957
- Spouse: Verna Willis (div.)

Charles P. Boyle (June 26, 1892 – May 28, 1968) was an American cinematographer.

== Biography ==
Born in Chicago in 1892, Boyle enjoyed his first credit as a cinematographer in 1925. Three years later, he was the director of photography on one of the silent cinema's biggest comedy hits, Tillie's Punctured Romance. He was second unit director on the Errol Flynn swashbuckler The Adventures of Robin Hood in 1938 and did additional work on Duel in the Sun in 1946.

He was nominated for an Academy Award for Best Cinematography in 1945 for his adventurous work on the Gene Kelly musical, Anchors Aweigh, a film famous for Kelly's dance with Jerry (of Tom and Jerry fame).

Boyle filmed a large number of westerns and also did a lot of work for the Disney studios in the late 1940s and 1950s, including the live-action sections of Fun and Fancy Free (1947), Davy Crockett, King of the Wild Frontier (1955), and his last film, Old Yeller (1957). He died in Los Angeles in 1968.

== Partial filmography ==
- A Regular Fellow (1925)
- Behind the Front (1926)
- The Runaway (1926)
- We're in the Navy Now (1926)
- The Little Adventuress (1927)
- The Ridin' Renegade (1928)
- Tillie's Punctured Romance (1928)
- In Old California (1929)
- After the Fog (1929)
- Mamba (1930)
- Follow Thru (1930)
- I Surrender Dear (1931)
- The Adventures of Robin Hood (1938)
- Beyond the Blue Horizon (1942)
- Anchors Aweigh (1945)
- Frontier Gal (1945)
- A Boy and His Dog (1946)
- The Road to Hollywood (1947)
- Saddle Tramp (1950)
- Tomahawk (1951)
- Apache Drums (1951)
- The Mark of the Renegade (1951)
- The Battle at Apache Pass (1951)
- The Cimarron Kid (1952)
- Steel Town (1952)
- Untamed Frontier (1952)
- Gunsmoke (1953)
- City Beneath the Sea (1953)
- The Stand at Apache River (1953)
- Davy Crockett, King of the Wild Frontier (1955)
- Westward Ho the Wagons! (1956)
- Johnny Tremain (1957)
- Old Yeller (1957)
