= Ferdinand Schumann-Heink =

German-American actor (1893–1958)

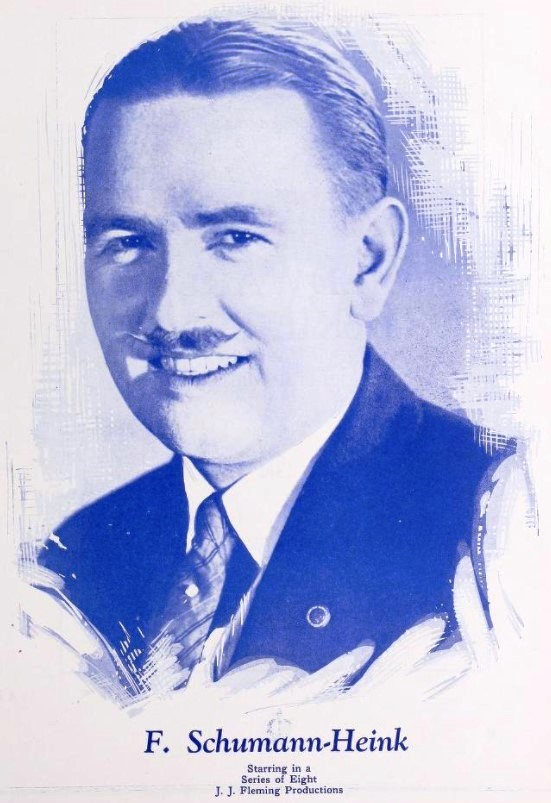
- Schumann-Heink in 1925
- Born: Ferdinand Schumann; 9 August 1893; Hamburg, German Empire (present-day Germany)
- Died: 15 September 1958 (aged 65); Los Angeles, California, U.S.
- Resting place: Fort Rosecrans National Cemetery, San Diego County, California
- Occupation: Actor
- Years active: 1925–1944
- Spouse: June Osborne
- Parents: Paul Schumann (father); Ernestine Schumann-Heink (mother)

Ferdinand Schumann-Heink (né Schumann; born 9 August 1893 – 15 September 1958) was a German-born American character actor with over 65 films to his credit.

Though most of his films were uncredited roles, he wrote the screenplay for the 1930 film Mamba.

During the First World War Ferdinand enlisted in the U.S. Army Field Artillery, serving at Camp Funston, Arizona, until he was medically discharged with weakened lungs from pneumonia. Ferdinand's brother George Washington Schumann-Heink died of illness whilst in the US Army. His brother August had returned to Germany, where he was killed in action with the Imperial German Navy when his U-boat hit a mine in the Mediterranean Sea.

== Personal life ==
Ferdinand Schumann-Heink (né Schumann) was the son of opera singer Ernestine Schumann-Heink. He was married to June Osborne.

== Death ==
Ferdinand Schumann-Heink died in Los Angeles on 15 September 1958, aged 65. He was buried in Fort Rosecrans National Cemetery, San Diego County, California.

== Selected filmography ==
- The Gallant Fool (1926)
- Hell's Angels (1930)
- Blaze o'Glory (1930)
- Fugitive Road (1934)
- The Widow from Monte Carlo (1935)
- Times Square Playboy (1936)
- Fugitive in the Sky (1936) (uncredited)
- Two Against the World (1936) as Sound Mixer
