= Patsy O'Leary =

American actress

- Born: Patsy Veloris O'Leary; 20 May 1911; County Cork, Ireland
- Occupation: Actress
- Spouse: Clement Joseph Joynt (m. 1930, div. 1936)

Patsy Veloris O'Leary (May 20, 1912 - ?) was an Irish-American actress known for her work on Mack Sennett comedies in the late 1920s and early 1930s.

== Biography ==
O'Leary was born Patsy Veloris O'Leary in County Cork, Ireland, to Irish mother Mary Donahue and a French father Grover C. LaGrange^; the family relocated to Paris when O'Leary was a girl before heading to America and settling in Tacoma, Washington. She got into acting as a child on Sennett's lot. She appeared in dozens of films over the course of her career (mostly comedies and Westerns) and also owned her own restaurant in Hollywood for a time. She married Dr. Clement Joseph Joynt (1905–1969) on June 16, 1930 and divorced him in 1936.

== Filmography ==
- The Girl from Everywhere (1927)
- A Dumb Waiter (1928)
- Girl-Shy Cowboy (1928)
- The Swim Princess (1928)
- Love at First Flight (1928)
- Run, Girl, Run (1928)
- Isle of Lost Men (1928)
- Uppercut O'Brien (1929)
- The New Half back (1929)
- Clancy at the Bat (1929)
- A Hollywood Star (1929)
- The Golfers (1929)
- The Lunkhead (1929)
- The Constabule (1929)
- The Barber's Daughter (1929)
- Jazz Mamas (1929)
- Motoring Mamas (1929)
- Girl Crazy (1929)
- The Bees' Buzz (1929)
- The Campus Carmen (1929)
- A Hollywood Theme Song (1930)
- Racket Cheers (1930)
- Don't Bite Your Dentist (1930)
- Take Your Medicine (1930)
- Grandma's Girl (1930)
- Midnight Daddies (1930)
- The Bluffer (1930)
- Vacation Loves (1930)
- Average Husband (1930)
- Hello, Television (1930)
- Goodbye Legs (1930)
- The Chumps (1930)
- Campus Crushes (1930)
- Fat Wives for Thin (1930)
- Radio Kisses (1930)
- Honeymoon Zeppelin (1930)
- He Trumped Her Ace (1930)
- Bulls and Bears (1930)
- Half Holiday (1931)
- One More Chance (1931)
- I Surrender Dear (1931)
- Poker Widows (1931)
- The World Flier (1931)
- Too Many Husbands (1931)
- The Fainting Lover (1931)
- In Conference (1931)
- Just a Bear (1931)
- The Dog Doctor (1931)
- The College Vamp (1931)
- The Flirty Sleepwalker (1932)
