= Ghost Parade =

1931 film

- Directed by: Mack Sennett
- Written by: Harry McCoy (writer); Stuart E. McGowan (writer); Arthur Ripley (writer); Earle Rodney (writer); Sydney Sloan (writer); Gene Towne (writer); G. Trano (writer); John A. Waldron (writer)
- Produced by: Mack Sennett
- Cinematography: Frank B. Good; George Unholz
- Edited by: William Hornbeck
- Distributed by: Educational Pictures
- Release date: May 24, 1931
- Running time: 18 minutes 20 minutes (American 2005 DVD release)
- Country: United States
- Language: English

Ghost Parade is a 1931 American short subject film directed by Mack Sennett.

== Plot summary ==
A disparate group of characters are menaced in a haunted house by mice playing a xylophone, a talking dog, a gorilla, and each other.

== Cast ==
- Harry Gribbon as The Constable
- Andy Clyde as Mr. Martin
- Marjorie Beebe
- Frank Eastman
- Marion Sayers
- Babe Stafford
- Charles Gemora as Gorilla
