= Sunny Skies (film) =

1930 film

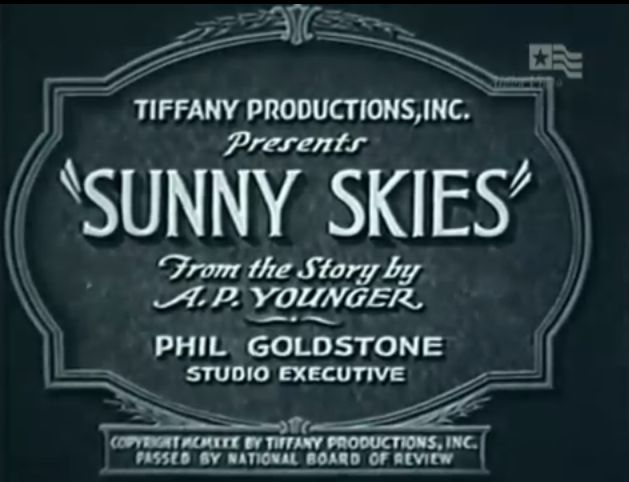
- Directed by: Norman Taurog
- Written by: George Cleveland
- Story by: A. P. Younger
- Produced by: Phil Goldstone
- Starring: Benny Rubin; Marceline Day; Marjorie Kane
- Cinematography: Arthur Reeves
- Edited by: Clarence Kolster
- Music by: Al Short
- Production company: Tiffany Pictures
- Distributed by: Tiffany-Stahl Productions
- Release date: May 12, 1930
- Running time: 73 minutes
- Country: United States
- Language: English

Sunny Skies is a 1930 American Pre-Code musical comedy film directed by Norman Taurog, and produced by Tiffany Pictures. The film stars Benny Rubin, Marceline Day, Rex Lease and Marjorie Kane.

== Plot ==
Jim Grant is a wise-cracking young man, who goes to college and finds that his roommate is Benny, a bashful and clownish Jewish lad, whose father is seeing that his son is well taken care of. The two become great pals and soon thereafter, Jim begins dating Mary, while Benny starts dating Doris.

When Jim gets himself into trouble because of his drinking, he is forced to leave the school in disgrace, as he has pushed Dave Randall, one of the football stars to the ground, which broke his arm.

After being gone for a semester, Jim returns to the college determined to redeem himself. He reunites with Mary and his friend Benny. Meanwhile, Benny has now taken up drinking, and he falls out a window while dancing drunk at a college party. As Benny lies on his deathbed in the hospital, the Doctor tells Jim that Benny must have a blood transfusion, which Jim volunteers for, unbeknownst to Benny.

The next day at the football game, Jim is substituted in the game at the last minute, and even though he is in a weakened condition, he still plays and ends up scoring the winning touchdown. When Jim faints at the goalpost, as a result of his frail condition, he is rushed to the hospital, where he meets up with Benny, who finds out it was Jim who saved his life.

== Cast ==
- Benny Rubin as Benny Krantz
- Marceline Day as Mary Norris
- Rex Lease as Jim Grant
- Marjorie Kane as Doris
- Harry Lee as Papa Krantz
- Wesley Barry as Stubble
- Greta Granstedt as College Widow
- Robert Livingston as Dave Randall
- James Wilcox as Smith
- Eddy Chandler as Coach

== Production ==
In January 1930, principal photography began on the film in Hollywood, and was wrapped up by February, with post-production taking place in March. In May, the publishing company Bibo-Lang acquired the rights to three of songs featured in the movie, and they were recorded by "Tom Clines for Brunswick Records, and by Eddie Walters for Columbia Records, respectively."

== Reception ==
Film critic Mordaunt Hall commented "if all the earlier carbon copies of popular college stories have not succeeded in making a film public tired of rah-rah films, then Sunny Skies, single-handed, may turn the trick; this film is so lacking in the elements of even a burlesque of college life that the sum of its efforts is little more than a blank."

Film critic Mira Dana wrote "the regular college movie formula is worn pretty thin; Rubin and Kane vary the usual goings-on with a good, if short little dance; Lease is the good looking 'bad actor', with Day opposite, looking more like a disdainful princess than the role requires." Critic Jimmy Starr stated the film is "one of those cock-eyed ideas on college life — a typical Hollywood version of how campus cutups and students behave; Taurog's direction is careless and of the very slapstick period; the musical numbers are far too long; it has little to recommend it."

Arthur Forde wrote in Hollywood Filmograph, "here is a clever picture by clever people, and while some of the gags were a little overworked, the final cutting will take care of this; bright lines, added to lilting music and an excellent cast will make this one a winner." Robert Hage from Motion Picture News noted that "Benny Rubin gets the top billing, but he belongs on the burleque wheel; the few laughs he gets are due to the situations concocted by the scenario writer; his grimaces and antics are painful and he was woefully miscast as a college freshman."

Billboard Magazine opined that "highest honors in this feature go to Benny Rubin, a Jewish lad with a personality all his own who kept the audience constantly in an uproar with his eccentricities and dialect; the laugh-packed plot has been the basis of other similarly themed pictures, tho seldom does one see the college undergrad burlesqued to the extent of this story except perhaps on the vaudeville stage; Rubin rans away with the comedy honors to the picture."

== Preservation status ==
The film is preserved at the Library of Congress, and was released on VHS by Alpha Video.
