= Isle of Lost Men =

1928 film

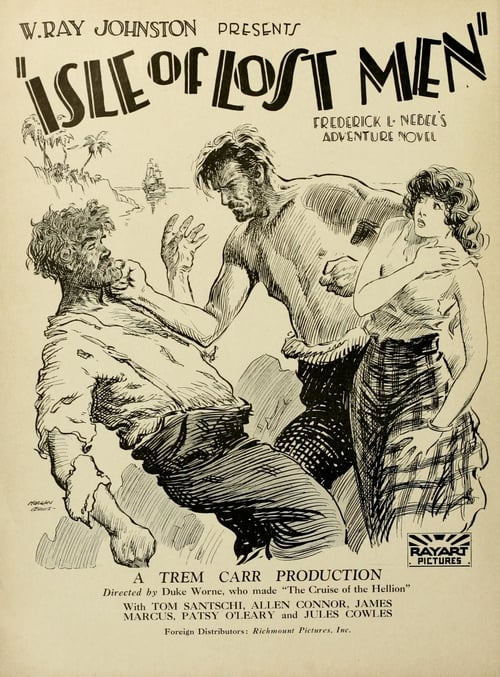
- Directed by: Duke Worne
- Written by: Dudley Early; Frederick Nebel; George W. Pyper
- Produced by: W. Ray Johnston
- Starring: Tom Santschi; James A. Marcus; Patsy O'Leary
- Cinematography: Hap Depew
- Edited by: J.S. Harrington
- Production company: Trem Carr Pictures
- Distributed by: Rayart Pictures
- Release date: October 2, 1928
- Running time: 62 minutes
- Country: United States
- Language: English intertitles

Isle of Lost Men is a 1928 American silent drama film directed by Duke Worne and starring Tom Santschi, James A. Marcus and Patsy O'Leary.

== Cast ==
- Tom Santschi as Captain Jan Jodahl
- James A. Marcus as Malay Pete
- Allen Connor as David Carlisle
- Patsy O'Leary as Alma Fairfax
- Paul Weigel as Preacher Jason
- Jules Cowles as Ship's Cook
- Maude George as Kealani
- Sailor Sharkey

== Bibliography ==
- Munden, Kenneth White. The American Film Institute Catalog of Motion Pictures Produced in the United States, Part 1. University of California Press, 1997.
