= The Dentist (1932 film) =

1932 film by Leslie Pearce

- Directed by: Leslie Pearce
- Written by: W. C. Fields
- Produced by: Mack Sennett
- Starring: W. C. Fields; Babe Kane; Elise Cavanna; Dorothy Granger
- Cinematography: John W. Boyle
- Distributed by: Paramount Pictures
- Release date: September 9, 1932
- Running time: 22 minutes
- Country: United States
- Language: English

The Dentist is a 1932 American pre-Code comedy short starring W. C. Fields. The film is one of four shorts Fields made with the "king of comedy," Mack Sennett, at Paramount. Although Sennett was near the end of his career, he found good use of the new medium of talking pictures for comedy, as the film demonstrates. It was directed by Leslie Pearce from a script by Fields himself. The film has been released on VHS and DVD.

== Plot ==
Fields plays a hot-tempered dentist who terrorizes his patients, who verbally/physically abuses his assistants and golfing-caddies alike, and whose daughter desires to marry an ice-delivery man. Fields disapproves of this match, especially after the starry-eyed daughter attempts to elope with her lover. Fields locks his daughter in her upstairs bedroom which is located above his dental office, where she proceeds to stamp her feet, causing plaster chunks to fall as he attempts to treat his patients.

Various patients with unusual physical traits (a tall "horse"-faced woman, a tiny, heavily-bearded man [Fields is obliged to use a stethoscope to locate the man's mouth]) arrive at the office, and he attempts to use his dental drill on them without any apparent pain killer. With one of his patients, he engages in an intimate wrestling match as he attempts to extract a painful tooth. Eventually the ice-delivery man procures a tall ladder and aids the dentist's daughter to escape from her dormitory window.

Fields observes the lovers just as they are prepared to run off, and – under pressure from the sizable crowd that has gathered at the foot of the ladder – grudgingly withdraws his opposition to the match. The film ends with Fields – who had previously threatened to purchase an electric refrigerator instead of ordering ice each day – contemptuously ordering his now-future-son-in-law to deliver "fifty pounds of ice, and make it snappy", prompting the daughter to joyfully embrace her fiance.

== Cast ==
- W. C. Fields as The Dentist
- Marjorie Kane as Mary, the Dentist's Daughter (as 'Babe' Kane)
- Arnold Gray as Arthur, the iceman
- Dorothy Granger as Miss Peppitone, patient
- Elise Cavanna as Miss Mason, patient
- Zedna Farley as Dental Assistant
- Billy Bletcher as Bearded patient (uncredited)
- Joe Bordeaux as Benford's Caddy (uncredited)
- Harry Bowen as Joe (uncredited)
- Bud Jamison as Charley Frobisher, golf partner (uncredited)
- Bobby Dunn as Dentist's Caddy (uncredited)
- Grady Sutton as golf partner (uncredited)

== Notes ==
- Some of Fields' comments are salty; it is clear that the studio deleted some of it because there are pauses in the soundtrack.
- Early in the short, Fields utilizes elements of the golf routine he developed for the Ziegfeld Follies, filmed on location at Lakeside Country Club (Toluca Lake, CA), and ending with Fields, after repeated failure to achieve a very difficult hole, throws the golf club, the golf bag and the caddy into the lake.
- The Dentist is one of three W. C. Fields short films that fell into the public domain after the copyright lapsed in the 1960s (the other two being The Golf Specialist, 1930, and The Fatal Glass of Beer, 1933). As such, these three films frequently appear on inexpensive video or DVD compilations.

== Bibliography ==
- Deschner, Donald, The Films of W. C. Fields (New York: The Citadel Press, 1966)
