= The Biggest Show on Earth =

1918 film

- Directed by: Jerome Storm
- Screenplay by: Julien Josephson; Florence Vincent
- Produced by: Thomas H. Ince
- Starring: Enid Bennett; Bliss Chevalier; Ethel Lynne; Melbourne MacDowell; Jack Nelson; Earle Rodney
- Cinematography: Charles J. Stumar
- Production company: Thomas H. Ince Corporation
- Distributed by: Paramount Pictures
- Release date: April 28, 1918
- Running time: 50 minutes
- Country: United States
- Language: Silent (English intertitles)

The Biggest Show on Earth is a surviving 1918 American silent drama film directed by Jerome Storm and written by Julien Josephson and Florence Vincent. The film stars Enid Bennett, Bliss Chevalier, Ethel Lynne, Melbourne MacDowell, Jack Nelson, and Earle Rodney. The film was released on April 28, 1918, by Paramount Pictures.

== Plot ==
As described in a film magazine, Roxie Kemp, a lion tamer in her father's circus, is sent to boarding school. The girls there have nothing to do with Roxie until she rescues them from a mad dog. Marjorie Trent, with a long line of ancestors, invites her to her home for the holiday season. As soon as Owen Trent sees Roxie, he thinks she is the only girl for him. His dream is shattered after Mrs. Trent learns Roxie is the daughter of a circus owner. However, Col. Jeffrey Trent tells her that their income comes from the circus, so the young couple are allowed to continue their courtship.

== Cast ==
- Enid Bennett as Roxie Kemp
- Bliss Chevalier as Mrs. Trent
- Ethel Lynne as Marjorie Trent
- Melbourne MacDowell as Nat Kemp
- Jack Nelson as Ross
- Earle Rodney as Owen Trent
- Carl Stockdale as Col. Jeffrey Trent

== Preservation ==
Previously lost, a print was found in the Gosfilmofond Archive, Moscow.
