= Billboard Girl =

1932 film

- Directed by: Leslie Pearce
- Screenplay by: John A. Waldron; Earle Rodney; Harry McCoy; Lew Foster
- Starring: Bing Crosby; Marjorie “Babe” Kane
- Cinematography: Charles P. Boyle; George Unholz
- Edited by: William Hornbeck
- Production company: Mack Sennett Comedies
- Distributed by: Educational Film Exchanges (though Fox Film Corporation)
- Release date: March 20, 1932
- Running time: 21 minutes
- Country: United States
- Language: English

Billboard Girl is a 1932 American comedy short film directed by Leslie Pearce and starring Bing Crosby. This was the fourth of the six short films Crosby made for Mack Sennett and which helped launch his career as a solo performer.

== Plot ==
Bing and his friend Jerry are seen admiring the picture of a college girl, Mary Malone, on a billboard. Bing has, without meeting her, fallen in love with the picture of the billboard girl and has written several letters to her. A reply he has received asks when he is coming to Benson College.

Unbeknown to Bing, his letters to Mary have been intercepted by her brother Freddie who, for a joke, has replied favourably in Mary's name. Bing and Jerry set off for Benson College in a car singing 'We're on Our Way to Bensonhurst' (a parody to the tune of 'Pop Goes the Weasel').

On arrival Bing sees Mary and thinking she is waiting for him, kisses her just as her boyfriend, Whitney, arrives on the scene and indignantly knocks down Bing. Later Bing tries to telephone Mary while beneath his window a group of Freddie's friends sing 'My Estelle'. Freddie takes the call and pretending to be Mary agrees to meet Bing at the arbour in the garden.

That night Freddie dresses in his sister's clothes and when it is dark meets Bing at the arbour where Freddie's friends are concealed behind the hedge to enjoy the joke. Whitney sees Bing with Freddie but thinks it is Mary. Whitney is very angry but Freddie knocks him unconscious with a croquet mallet. Freddie sits on a garden swing while Bing sings 'Were You Sincere' and the real Mary hears him. When Freddie sees Whitney recovering, he runs off leaving Mary to take his place while Bing sings 'For You'. There is a happy ending for all except Whitney when Mary transfers her affections to Bing.

'For You' is heard again sung by Bing off-screen when Whitney and Mary's father stand outside her bedroom looking at the marriage certificate pinned to the door.

== Cast ==
- Bing Crosby as Bing
- Marjorie “Babe” Kane as Mary Malone
- Dick Stewart as Jerry
- Jimmy Eagles as Freddie
- Lincoln Stedman as Whitney
- George Pearce as Mr. Malone

== Background ==
Crosby produced six short films for Mack Sennett, of which four were shot over the course of three months in 1931 and the other two in 1932. The shorts were:

- I Surrender Dear (released September 1931)
- One More Chance (released November 1931)
- Dream House (released January 1932)
- Billboard Girl (released March 1932)
- Sing, Bing, Sing (released March 1933)
- Blue of the Night (released January 1933)

== Reception ==
The Film Daily commented, inter alia: “…The comedy is fair, but the singer’s crooning puts it over.”

== Soundtrack ==
- "Were You Sincere?" (Vincent Rose / Jack Meskill)
- "Pop Goes the Weasel" (parody)
- "For You”
- “My Estelle” (Gustave Kerker / Hugh Morton)
