= Blue of the Night =

1933 film

- Bing meets Marian's friends for the first time
- Directed by: Leslie Pearce
- Starring: Bing Crosby; Marjorie “Babe” Kane
- Distributed by: Paramount Pictures
- Release date: January 6, 1933
- Running time: 20 minutes
- Country: United States
- Language: English

Blue of the Night is a 1933 Mack Sennett Star Comedy (No. S3628) directed by Leslie Pearce and starring Bing Crosby. It was the last of the six short films Crosby made for Mack Sennett and which helped launch his career as a solo performer. The short's copyright was not renewed, but its reuse is still restricted as songs featured in it are still copyrighted. (Note: This includes Where the Blue of the Night which will enter the public domain on January 1, 2027 under R223341.)

== Background ==
Six shorts were made by Crosby for Mack Sennett, of which were four filmed in a three-month period in 1931 and two in 1932. The shorts were:

- I Surrender Dear (released September 1931)
- One More Chance (released November 1931)
- Dream House (released January 1932)
- Billboard Girl (released March 1932)
- Sing, Bing, Sing (released March 1933)
- Blue of the Night (released January 1933)

After filming the first four shorts in 1931, Crosby went to New York and enjoyed great success on the radio and through live appearances at the Paramount Theatre. He was soon signed to make a film called The Big Broadcast and he returned to Hollywood on June 12, 1932. First of all, he had to fulfil his contract with Sennett and on June 17, he started filming “Sing, Bing, Sing” (original title The Girl in the Transom) on June 17. Then on July 2, 1932, filming started on “Blue of the Night” (original title “Honey Crooners”). Crosby had adopted "Where the Blue of the Night (Meets the Gold of the Day)" as his theme song late in 1931 and it had enjoyed chart success reaching No. 4 in the charts of the day. It was therefore entirely appropriate that it should be partially employed as the title for this short film.

== Cast ==
- Bing – Bing Crosby
- Marian Bradley – Marjorie “Babe” Kane
- Gilbert Sinclair – Franklin Pangborn
- Policeman – Bud Jamison
- Marian’s Friend– Toby Wing

== Plot ==
The film opens as Bing, a famous radio singer, makes a farewell appearance at a night club and sings 'My Silent Love' which he follows, by request, with 'Auf Wiedersehen, My Dear'.

Later he happens to board a train at the same time as a young lady, Marian, and they are mistakenly showered with confetti intended for another party, The passengers and train porter assume they are newly-weds and present them with a perambulator and two baby dolls. Marian, failing to recognise him, tries to impress by saying that she is engaged to Bing Crosby. When she says that it is the first night she has not heard Bing sing, he tells her that he has a portable radio. As his berth in the sleeper train is the one immediately above hers, he says that he will play it for her. In the upper berth he simulates radio tuning noises and then sings 'Ev'ry Time My Heart Beats' accompanying himself on guitar.

Subsequently, Marian's friends see a newspaper report about her engagement to Bing. Gilbert Sinclair is indignant and says that it was taken for granted that he and Marian were engaged. Marian denies any such arrangement and is then told that Bing has telephoned to say he is arriving that afternoon.

When Bing arrives, he tells Marian that he is Jack Smith, a reporter, and that he had put news of her engagement in the press. She confesses that she lied and is in an embarrassing position with her friends and he promises to help her. Their conversation is overheard by Gilbert and when Bing meets Marian's friends and explains how he met Marian, Gilbert tries to expose him and wagers his Cadillac car that Bing is an imposter.

To prove his identity to Marian's friends and to a police patrolman who holds the car keys and Bing's five dollar stake, Bing sings his signature tune 'Where the Blue of the Night (Meets the Gold of the Day)', finishing the song as he and Marian drive off in the car leaving Gilbert floundering in the swimming pool after resisting the loss of his automobile.

== Reception ==
The Motion Picture Herald was enthusiastic. "With Bing Crosby singing 3 of his most popular numbers, “Auf Wiedersehen,” “Every Time My Heart Beats” and “Blue of the Night,” this catchy Sennett film looks to be one of those that will draw in about as much money as the regular feature."

== Soundtrack ==
- "My Silent Love" (Dana Suesse / Edward Heyman)
- "Auf Wiedersehen, My Dear” (Milton Ager / Ed G. Nelson / Al Hoffman / Al Goodhart)
- "Ev’ry Time My Heart Beats” (Benny Davis / Gerald Marks)
- "Where the Blue of the Night (Meets the Gold of the Day)"
