= Sing, Bing, Sing =

1933 film

- Directed by: Babe Stafford
- Starring: Bing Crosby; Florine McKinney
- Distributed by: Paramount Pictures
- Release date: March 24, 1933
- Running time: 19 minutes
- Country: United States
- Language: English

Sing, Bing, Sing is a 1933 Mack Sennett Star Comedy (No. S3627) starring Bing Crosby and directed by Babe Stafford. It was the fifth of the six short films Crosby made for Mack Sennett and which helped launch his career as a solo performer.

== Background ==
Six shorts were made by Crosby for Mack Sennett, of which four were filmed in a three-month period in 1931 and two in 1932. The shorts were:

- I Surrender Dear (released September 1931)
- One More Chance (released November 1931)
- Dream House (released January 1932)
- Billboard Girl (released March 1932)
- Sing, Bing, Sing (released March 1933)
- Blue of the Night (released January 1933)

After filming the first four shorts in 1931, Crosby went to New York and enjoyed great success on the radio and through live appearances at the Paramount Theatre. He was soon signed to make a film called The Big Broadcast and he returned to Hollywood on June 12, 1932. First of all, he had to fulfil his contract with Sennett and on June 17, he started filming Sing, Bing, Sing (original title The Girl in the Transom) on June 17.

== Plot ==
The film opens with Bing, a crooner, singing 'In My Hideaway' over the radio and at the conclusion of the song he arranges over the microphone to meet his girl Helen in 15 minutes so that they can elope.

Helen's father, who hates crooners, is listening to the radio and with Helen's fiancé and two hired detectives awaits Bing's arrival. When Bing arrives outside Helen's window he gives a pre-arranged whistling signal but Helen's father, dressed in her clothes, climbs down the ladder and seizes Bing while Helen's fiancé and the two detectives appear on the scene to assist. The elopement is stopped therefore but later Bing, after singing 'Between the Devil and the Deep Blue Sea' telephones Helen from his hotel room. She tells him that her father has locked her in her room and she tries to persuade her father to release her so that she can feed Charlie, his pet gorilla, but he refuses and instead instructs Helen's fiancé and the two detectives to feed Charlie.

Bing arrives at the house and, beneath her window, sings 'Lovable'. Helen manages to climb through the window and they drive off in his car pursued by her father, the two detectives and Charlie the gorilla who had escaped while attempts were being made to feed him with fresh cow's milk. Helen's fiancé, clad in his nightshirt, brings up the rear furiously pedalling a bicycle. In a frantic chase Charlie lands the car and its occupants in a river while Bing and Helen fly off in an aeroplane with Bing singing 'Snuggled on Your Shoulder'.

== Cast ==
- Bing – Bing Crosby
- Helen – Florine McKinney
- Helen’s father – Irving Bacon
- Helen’s fiancé – Franklin Pangborn
- Holmes – Arthur Stone
- Barnes – Marvin Loback
- Charlie (the gorilla) – Charles Gemora

== Soundtrack ==
- "Between the Devil and the Deep Blue Sea"
- "In My Hideaway" (K. L. Binford)
- "Snuggled on Your Shoulder" (parody)
- "Lovable" (Harry M. Woods / Gus Kahn)
