= Leslie Pearce (director) =

New Zealand film director (1887–1977)

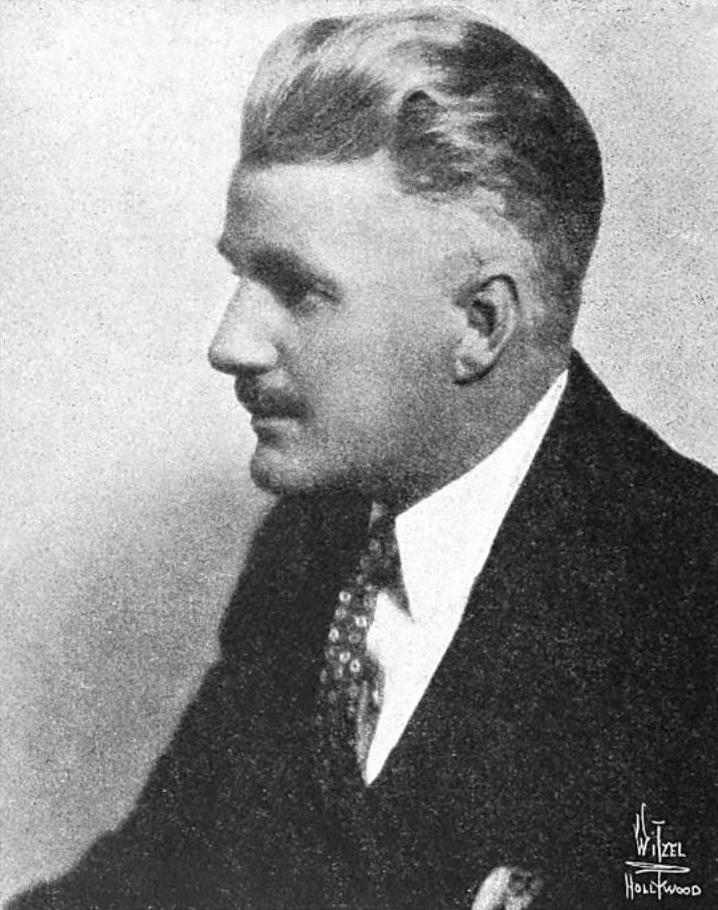
- Born: Arnold Leslie Pearce; 20 April 1887
- Died: 17 August 1977 (aged 90)
- Occupation: Film director

Arnold Leslie Pearce (20 April 1887 – 17 August 1977) was a New Zealand film director, who directed numerous short films in Hollywood during the 1930s, including several with W.C. Fields and Bing Crosby.

== Selected filmography ==
- The Delightful Rogue (1929)
- Meet the Wife (1931)
- The Dentist (1932)
- Blue of the Night (1933)
- The Stoker (1935)
- Can You Hear Me, Mother? (1935)
- You Must Get Married (1936)
- The Road to Hollywood (1947)
