= For You (Ricky Nelson song) =

Song
- Written: 1930
- Composer: Joe Burke
- Lyricist: Al Dubin

"For You" is a song written by Joe Burke and Al Dubin in 1930. It was introduced in the Mack Sennett short Billboard Girl (1932) when it was sung by Bing Crosby. The best known version was from musician Rick Nelson in 1964, when it peaked at #6 on the Billboard Hot 100 and at #66 on the year end.

== Other versions ==
- Casa Loma Orchestra – recorded for Brunswick Records on May 26, 1933, catalog No. 6606A.
- The Glen Gray Orchestra recorded it for Decca Records (catalog No. 1412) on July 23, 1937 with Kenny Sargent doing the vocals.
- Jo Stafford – recorded on January 20, 1941 with Tommy Dorsey and his Orchestra for Victor Records (catalog No. 36399). She recorded it again in 1960 and it was included in her album Jo + Jazz.
- Erroll Garner and his trio – recorded April 9, 1946 for Mercury Records (catalog No. 1034B).
- Perry Como recorded it on November 20, 1947, releasing the song in 1948.
- George Shearing Quintet – recorded July 5, 1950 for MGM Records (catalog No. 10907A).
- Rosemary Clooney – recorded June 29, 1956 and included in her album Rosie Swings Softly (1960).
- Julie London – included in her album Julie (1957).
- Dean Martin – recorded it for his album Pretty Baby in 1957.
- Nat King Cole – recorded in 1958 and included in the Bear Family set Stardust.
- Patti Page – for her album Indiscretion (1959).
- Jimmy Jones - recorded on the B side of "Ready for Love" (1960).
- Steve Lawrence – for his album Portrait of My Love (1961).
- Timi Yuro also recorded the song. It was released on her LP Timi Yuro (Liberty LRP-3208 (mono) and Liberty LST-7208 (stereo) in 1961.
- The biggest hit version of the song was recorded by Rick Nelson in 1963. Nelson's version went to number six on the US pop chart and spent two weeks at number one on the Middle-Road chart in early 1964; this would be Nelson's final single to reach the Top 10 until "Garden Party" in 1972.
- The Fabulous Echoes – recorded on the B side of "Wait N' See／For You" in 1964 for Diamond Records, Hong Kong (D.210).
- Vic Laurens recorded a French version, “Pour toi”, for Mercury Records, 1964.

== See also ==
- List of number-one adult contemporary singles of 1964 (U.S.)
