= Marjorie Kane =

American actress (1909–1992)

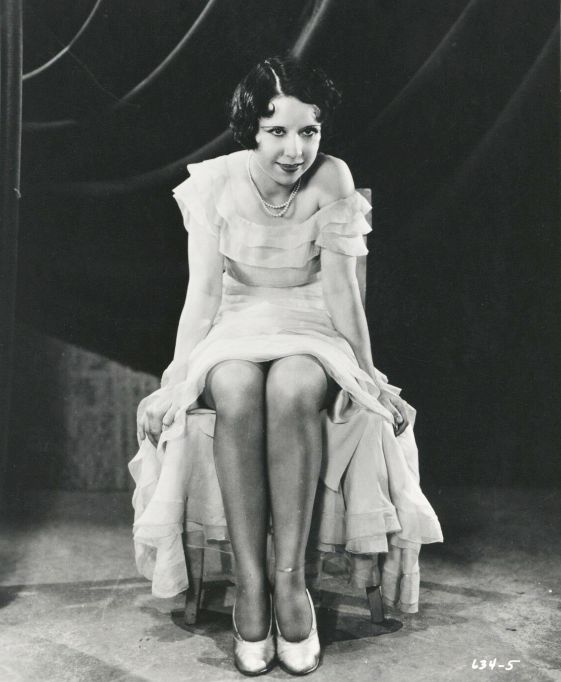
- Born: April 28, 1909; Chicago, Illinois, U.S.
- Died: January 8, 1992 (aged 82); Los Angeles, California, U.S.
- Occupation: Actress
- Years active: 1929–1951
- Spouse: William Hornbeck

Marjorie Kane (April 28, 1909 – January 8, 1992) was an American film and stage actress born in Chicago. She appeared in more than 60 films between 1929 and 1951, occasionally under the name Babe Kane.

== Career ==
Kane appeared on stage for 11 years before she was signed to a five-year contract with Mack Sennett in 1929. Her contract was validated by Los Angeles superior Judge Keech, as she was under legal signing age (she was 20).

Her long run in the play Good News garnered her favorable reviews and interested two studios in giving her screen tests in 1928. "When I took my screen tests," she said, "I was continually conscious of the fact that I was in front of a movie camera and had to act. I was scared to death and couldn't do a thing. I tried my best to be natural but failed terribly."

== Partial filmography ==
- Border Romance (1929) – Nina
- The Dance of Life (1929) – Performer: 'The Flippity Flop' (uncredited)
- The Great Gabbo (1929) – Babe
- Gol! Gol! (1929) – Student (uncredited)
- Be Yourself (1930) – Lola
- Ladies in Love (1930) – Marjorie
- Sunny Skies (1930) – Doris
- Hot Curves (1930) – Vaudeville Girl
- Bubbles (1930, Short) — Uncredited
- Night Work (1930) – Cabaret Singer (uncredited)
- Billboard Girl (1932, Short) – Mary Malone
- The Loud Mouth (1932, Short) – Edith Morgan
- The Dentist (1932, Short) – Mary – Dentist's Daughter
- Blue of the Night (1933, Short) – Marian Bradley
- The Pharmacist (1933, Short) – Priscilla Dilweg
- Take a Chance (1933) – Dancehall Girl (uncredited)
- Something to Sing About (1937) – Regan's Receptionist (uncredited)
- Merrily We Live (1938) – Rosa
- Swiss Miss (1938) – Chambermaid (uncredited)
- The Marines Are Here (1938) – Cabaret Girl (uncredited)
- Having Wonderful Time (1938) – Camp Guest (uncredited)
- The Gladiator (1938) – Miss Taylor – Student (uncredited)
- Youth Takes a Fling (1938) – Switchboard Operator (uncredited)
- Crime Takes a Holiday (1938) – Singer (uncredited)
- There Goes My Heart (1938) – Secretary (uncredited)
- Sweethearts (1938) – Telephone Operator (uncredited)
- Trade Winds (1938) – Sam's girl (uncredited)
- Three Smart Girls Grow Up (1939) – Wedding Guest (uncredited)
- Broadway Serenade (1939) – 3rd 5&10 Salesgirl (uncredited)
- Little Accident (1939) – Woman Ironer (uncredited)
- Destry Rides Again (1939) – Saloon Floozie (uncredited)
- Slightly Honorable (1939) – Telephone Operator (uncredited)
- I Take This Woman (1940) – Cashier (scenes deleted)
- Scatterbrain (1940) – (uncredited)
- Melody and Moonlight (1940) – Showgirl (uncredited)
- Hit Parade of 1941 (1940) – Minor Role (uncredited)
- Youth Will Be Served (1940) – Sue (uncredited)
- Second Chorus (1940) – Secretary
- Sailors on Leave (1941) – Perky Cutie (uncredited)
- The Officer and the Lady (1941) – Phone Operator (uncredited)
- Dick Tracy vs. Crime, Inc. (1941, Serial) – Cigarette Girl (uncredited)
- Design for Scandal (1941) – Telephone Operator (uncredited)
- Girl Trouble (1942) – Cashier (uncredited)
- You Can't Escape Forever (1942) – Bridesmaid (uncredited)
- Man from Frisco (1944) – Girl (uncredited)
- Reckless Age (1944) – Restaurant Patron (uncredited)
- Behind City Lights (1945) – Waitress (uncredited)
- Mildred Pierce (1945) – Waitress (uncredited)
- Girls of the Big House (1945) – Inmate (uncredited)
- Life with Blondie (1945) – Minor Role (uncredited)
- Cinderella Jones (1946) – War Plant Worker (uncredited)
- The File on Thelma Jordon (1949) – Courtroom Spectator (uncredited)
- The Secret Fury (1950) – Maid (uncredited)
- Again Pioneers (1950) – Church Woman at The Patch (uncredited)
- Week-End with Father (1951) – Maid at Party (uncredited)
