= Out of Nowhere (Johnny Green song) =

1931 popular song

The cover of Johnny Green and His Orchestra's recording of "Out of Nowhere"

"Out of Nowhere" is a popular song composed by Johnny Green with lyrics by Edward Heyman and published by Famous Music. It was popularized by Bing Crosby, and was the first recording under his Brunswick Records contract. He recorded it on March 30, 1931 and it became his first number one hit as a solo artist. Crosby also sang it in the film Confessions of a Co-Ed (1931) and in his short film I Surrender Dear (1931). He recorded it again in 1954 for his album Bing: A Musical Autobiography.

Other 1931 recordings were by Leo Reisman and his Orchestra (vocal by Frank Munn) which reached No. 6 in the charts of the day, Smith Ballew and his Orchestra, Ruth Etting, and Roy Fox and His band (vocal: Al Bowlly) recorded July 31, 1931. (Al Bowlly Discography).

The song's harmonic progression has been used in several later songs, such as Tadd Dameron's "Casbah", Fats Navarro's "Nostalgia", Gigi Gryce's "Sans Souci", and Lennie Tristano's "317 East 32nd Street".

It has become a jazz standard, with dozens of instrumental and vocal versions by various artists.

== Other recordings ==
- Ray Anthony – Ray Anthony Plays for Dream Dancing (1956)
- Chet Baker – Rare Chet
- Dave Brubeck with Paul Desmond – Jazz Goes to College (1954)
- Don Byas – recorded as "You Came Along" on June 27, 1945 for Jamboree
- Vic Damone – That Towering Feeling! (1956) and Closer Than a Kiss (1958).
- Ella Fitzgerald – recorded June 29, 1939 as a single for Decca
- Russell Garcia – The Johnny Evergreens (1958), with John Williams on piano and Don Fagerquist on trumpet
- Stephan Grappelli with Django Reinhardt (1939)
- Coleman Hawkins with Benny Carter and Django Reinhardt (1937)
- Lena Horne with Teddy Wilson and His Orchestra – recorded September 15, 1941, for Columbia
- Frank Ifield – released March 31, 1967, Columbia Records 45 RPM Disc
- Bunk Johnson – Last Testament (1947)
- Patti Page – In the Land of Hi-Fi (1956)
- Charlie Parker with Miles Davis (1947)
- Anthony Perkins – On a Rainy Afternoon (1958) (RCA)
- Ahmed Abdul Malik – Sounds of Africa (1963)
- Frank Sinatra with the Tommy Dorsey Orchestra – recorded July 30, 1942
- Art Tatum – (1947)

== Film appearances ==
- 1931 Dude Ranch
- 1931 Confessions of a Co-Ed – sung by Bing Crosby
- 1931 I Surrender Dear – sung by Bing Crosby
- 1945 You Came Along – sung by Helen Forrest
- 1951 A Place in the Sun - arr. by Franz Waxman
- 1954 Sabrina – instrumental
- 1957 The Joker Is Wild – sung by Frank Sinatra, parody lyrics by Harry Harris
- 1959 The Rat Race
- 1969 They Shoot Horses, Don't They?
- 1974 The Conversation
- 1987 September – Bert Ambrose and His Orchestra
- 1993 Manhattan Murder Mystery – Coleman Hawkins and His All-Star Jam Band
- 1997 Deconstructing Harry – Django Reinhardt
- 1999 Sweet and Lowdown – Dick Hyman

== See also ==
- List of 1930s jazz standards
