= One More Chance (1931 film) =

1931 film

- Bing sings "Wrap Your Troubles in Dreams"
- Directed by: Mack Sennett
- Screenplay by: John A. Waldron; Earle Rodney; Harry McCoy; Lew Foster
- Starring: Bing Crosby; Arthur Stone; Patsy O'Leary; Matty Kemp
- Cinematography: Charles P. Boyle; George Unholz
- Edited by: William Hornbeck
- Production company: Educational Pictures
- Distributed by: Fox Film
- Release date: November 15, 1931
- Running time: 20 minutes
- Country: United States
- Language: English

One More Chance is a 1931 Educational-Mack Sennett Featurette (No. S2687) starring Bing Crosby and directed by Mack Sennett. This was the second of the six short films Crosby made for Sennett and which helped launch his career as a solo performer. This film is notable for Crosby first singing on film his classic hit "Wrap Your Troubles in Dreams" which is sung to a bevy of giggling overweight Native American maidens who gradually close in on him. He also sings "Just One More Chance" which topped the various charts of the day in 1931.

== Plot ==
Bing Bangs (Crosby) is a salesman for "Magic" washing machines and his demonstration of the machine at the beginning of the film results in disaster. Crosby later gains a transfer from Hoboken to California and he drives his wife Ethel and her Uncle Joe (who dislikes Bing) in an open car on the journey having many adventures en route. Uncle Joe presses Ethel to divorce Bing and marry a more desirable suitor called Percy Howard. Ethel, Joe and Percy are dining in a California night club when the announcer refers to the sponsor, the Magic Washing Machine Company and introduces their singer. It is Crosby and he sings "Just One More Chance" and he and Ethel reunite.

== Cast ==
- Bing Crosby as Bing Bangs
- Arthur Stone as Uncle Joe
- Patsy O'Leary as Ethel Bangs
- Matty Kemp as Percy Howard
- George Gray as George Dobbs
- Alice Adair as Mrs. Dobbs
- Kalla Pasha as Brown / Kelly the Wrestler

== Background ==
Six shorts were made by Crosby for Mack Sennett, of which were four filmed in a three-month period in 1931 and two in 1932. The shorts were:

- I Surrender Dear (released September 1931)
- One More Chance" (released November 1931)
- Dream House (released January 1932)
- Billboard Girl (released March 1932)
- Sing, Bing, Sing (released March 1933)
- Blue of the Night (released January 1933)

== Reception ==
Film Daily. "Featuring Bing Crosby, the radio crooner, in a slight story that jumps all over the map and is very disconnected. The “plot” is pretty hazy, if any. Bing is a happy-go-lucky salesman for an electric washing machine who depends on his songs to sell his wares. He has the usual trouble holding his wife from the other fellow, but wins her back in the last sequence by crooning his song. Bing's crooning is okay, but as a comedian there is little to be said in his favor. Or was it the fault of the material?"

Variety. "Second of the two-reelers by the radio crooner, also bearing as title one of the torch numbers he uses, the first being “I Surrender Dear.” New subject is first rate, Crosby revealing a camera presence, remarkable to those who have seen his mild personal appearances on the Paramount stage....Crosby displays a capital comedy sense, plays with assurance and certainty. Subject is worth minor featuring in lieu of air popularity.

== Soundtrack ==
- "Just One More Chance"
- "Wrap Your Troubles in Dreams"
- "I Surrender Dear" (parody)
- I'd Climb the Highest Mountain
