= Confessions of a Co-Ed =

1931 film

- Directed by: David Burton; Dudley Murphy
- Starring: Phillips Holmes; Sylvia Sidney; Norman Foster; Claudia Dell; Florence Britton; Martha Sleeper
- Cinematography: John Leipold
- Edited by: Lee Garmes
- Production company: Paramount Pictures
- Distributed by: Paramount Pictures
- Release date: July 11, 1931
- Running time: 70 minutes
- Country: United States
- Language: English

Confessions of a Co-Ed is a 1931 American drama film starring Phillips Holmes, Sylvia Sidney and Norman Foster, and featuring a rare onscreen appearance by the musical Rhythm Boys (Bing Crosby, Harry Barris and Al Rinker). The picture was directed by David Burton and Dudley Murphy, and the convoluted plot involves a college student who marries the wrong man then grapples with a dilemma when the actual father returns. At the beginning of the movie, Crosby, Barris and Rinker perform the fast-paced "Ya Got Love" at a fraternity party after Crosby sings his current hit "Out of Nowhere."

== Plot ==
The intimate diary of Patricia Harper tells the story of her four years at co-educational Stafford College. Attracting the attentions of Dan Carter and Hal Evans she falls in love with Dan only to be accused by her fellow student Peggy Wilson of stealing him from her. Consequently, Pat decides not to see Dan again and he is persuaded by Peggy, in an effort to regain his affection, to take her out in Hal's car. On an 'out of bounds' road the car knocks down a policeman and runs into a ditch but the pair escape unrecognised. Peggy's vanity case is found in the car, however, and she is expelled from the college without divulging the identity of her companion.

During the Christmas holidays Hal and Pat join a party of students, which includes Dan, on a mountain ski-ing expedition. Dan manages to separate Pat from the others and takes her to a forest ranger's hut where, finding themselves alone, they make love. Hal; jealous and angry with Dan, reveals to the Dean that Dan was in his car with Peggy and Dan, too, is expelled. He leaves without saying goodbye to Pat. When Peggy visits the college to collect personal belongings Pat confides that she is pregnant. Peggy advises her to marry Hal but Pat refuses to deceive him and writes a letter of explanation which Peggy promises to deliver. Pat and Hal are married but it is not until three years later that Pat discovers that Peggy did not deliver her letter.

On that same day Dan returns from South America and Hal, without revealing to whom he is married, takes Dan home to dinner. Dan tells Hal that he betrayed Pat but that he loves her and wants to marry her. When Pat returns home and finds that Hall now knows the truth about the child there is a violent quarrel and she confesses that she still loves Dan. Hal agrees to a divorce so that the parents of the child he thought was his can be married.

== Cast ==
- Phillips Holmes as Dan Carter
- Sylvia Sidney as Patricia Harper
- Norman Foster as Hal Evans
- Claudia Dell as Peggy
- Florence Britton as Adelaide
- Martha Sleeper as Lucille
- Dorothy Libaire as Mildred Stevens
- Marguerite Warner as Sally
- George Irving as College President
- Winter Hall as Dean Winslow
- Eulalie Jensen as Dean Marbridge
- Bruce Coleman as Mark
- The Rhythm Boys as Vocal Trio
