= Arthur Stone (actor) =

American actor (1883–1940)

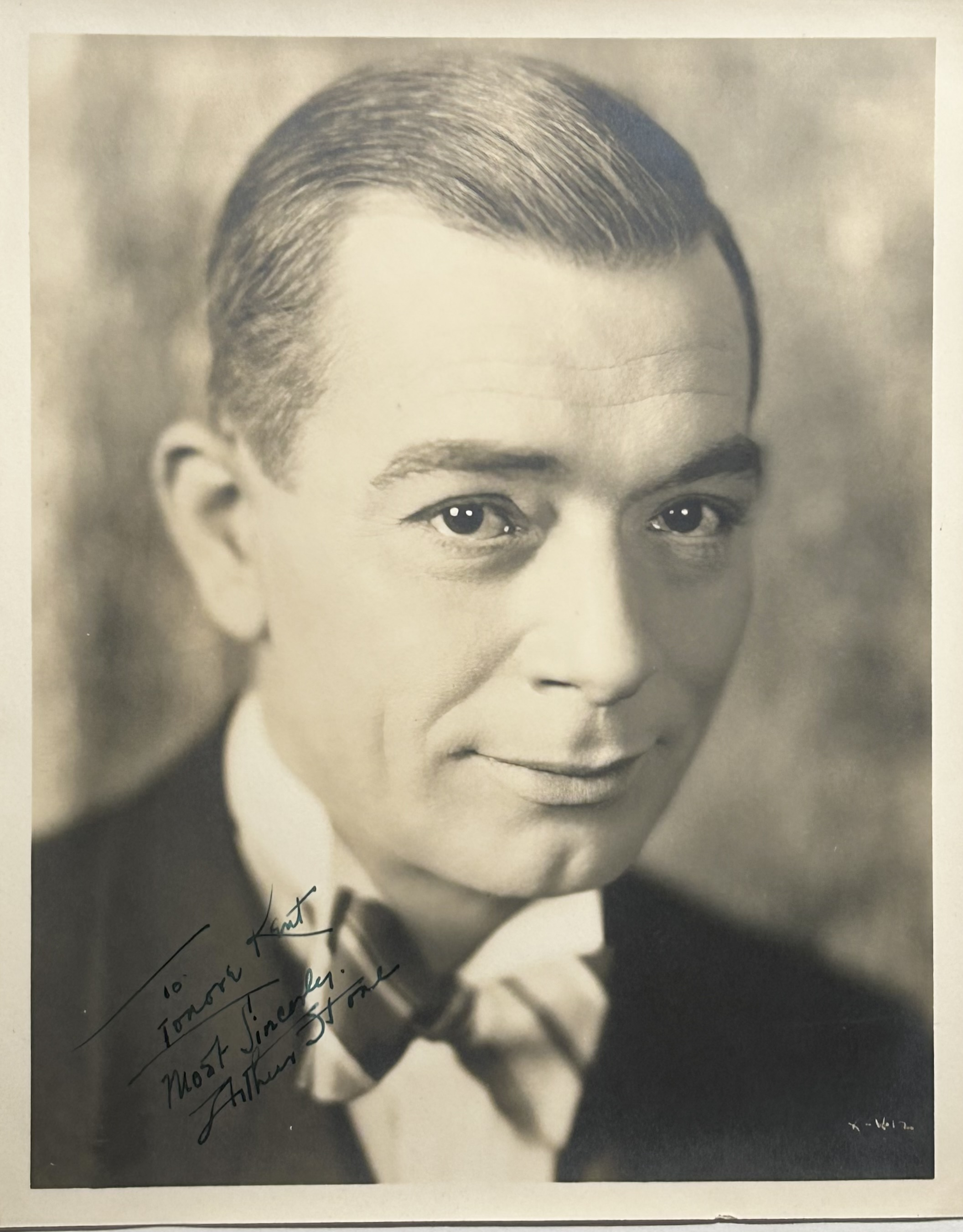
- Born: Arthur Taylor Goetze; November 28, 1883; St. Louis, Missouri, U.S.
- Died: September 4, 1940 (aged 56); Hollywood, California, U.S.
- Resting place: Forest Lawn Memorial Park, Glendale, California
- Occupation: Actor
- Years active: 1924–1938
- Spouse: Dorothy Westmore

Arthur Stone (born Arthur Taylor Goetze; November 28, 1883 – September 4, 1940) was an American character actor of the late silent and early sound film eras.

== Biography ==
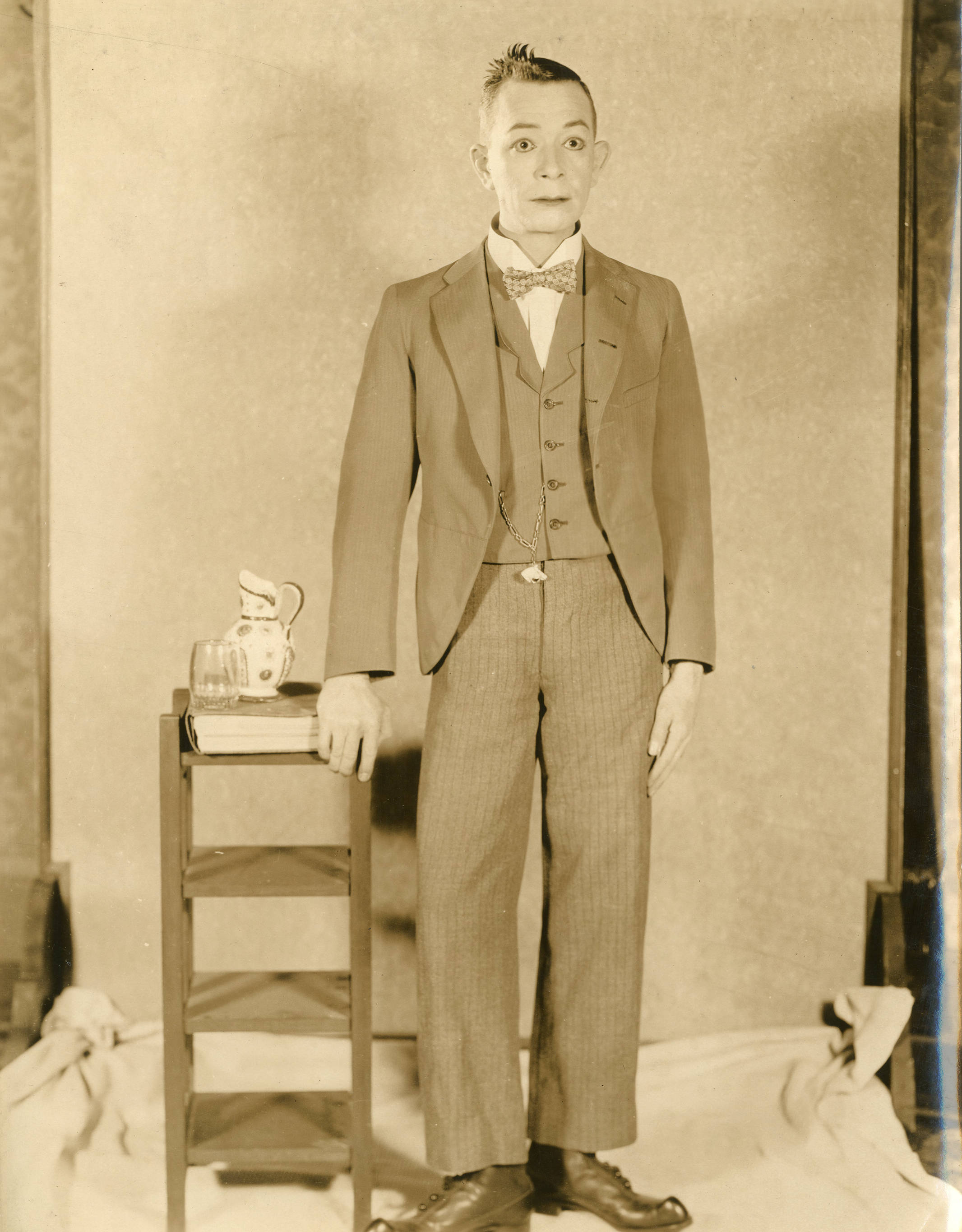
Arthur Stone (1924)

Born in St. Louis, Missouri, on November 28, 1883, Stone entered the film industry by starring in several film shorts for the Hal Roach Studios in 1924 and 1925. 1926 would see his first appearance in a feature film, Miss Nobody, directed by Lambert Hillyer and starring Walter Pidgeon.

During the remainder of the silent era, he would appear in over a dozen films, in either supporting or starring roles. 1926 would see him in supporting roles, but 1927 and 1928 would see him move up to star billing in such films as The Valley of the Giants (1927), The Farmer's Daughter (1928), and Chicken a la King (1928). With the advent of sound films, 1929 would see Stone continue to be cast in featured roles, such as The Far Call and Fugitives.

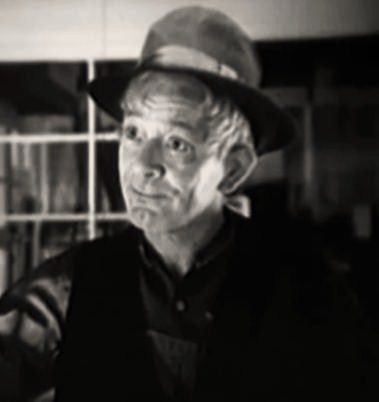
Stone in She Had to Choose (1934)

The 1930s would see Stone almost exclusively in supporting and smaller roles, as in Bordertown (1935), starring Paul Muni and Bette Davis, and 1936's Fury, directed by Fritz Lang, and starring Sylvia Sidney and Spencer Tracy. His final on-screen performance would be in Edward F. Cline's Go Chase Yourself (1938), starring Joe Penner and Lucille Ball. During his brief career, he would appear in over 50 films, and numerous shorts.

Stone died on September 4, 1940, in Hollywood, California, and was buried at Forest Lawn Memorial Park in Glendale, California.

== Filmography ==
(Per AFI database)

- The Girl from Montmartre (1926)
- Miss Nobody (1926)
- It Must Be Love (1926)
- The Silent Lover (1926)
- An Affair of the Follies (1927)
- Babe Comes Home (1927)
- Hard-Boiled Haggerty (1927)
- The Patent Leather Kid (1927)
- The Sea Tiger (1927)
- The Valley of the Giants (1927)
- Burning Daylight (1928)
- Chicken a La King (1928)
- The Farmer's Daughter (1928)
- Me, Gangster (1928)
- Red Wine (1928)
- Frozen Justice (1929)
- Captain Lash (1929)
- The Far Call (1929)
- Fox Movietone Follies of 1929 (1929)
- Fugitives (1929)
- New Year's Eve (1929)
- Thru Different Eyes (1929)
- The Bad Man (1930)
- The Arizona Kid (1930)
- The Lash (1930)
- The Girl of the Golden West (1930)
- Mamba (1930)
- On the Level (1930)
- The Vagabond King (1930)
- Bad Company (1931)
- The Conquering Horde (1931)
- One More Chance (1931)
- Secret Menace (1931)
- The Big Shot (1931)
- So Big (1932)
- While Paris Sleeps (1932)
- Roar of the Dragon (1932)
- The Broken Wing (1932)
- That's My Boy (1932)
- She Had to Choose (1934)
- Million Dollar Baby (1934)
- Love Birds (1934)
- I'll Tell the World (1934)
- Bordertown (1935)
- Charlie Chan in Egypt (1935)
- Hot Tip (1935)
- Under the Pampas Moon (1935)
- Fury (1936) as Durkin
- Back to Nature (1936)
- Westbound Mail (1937)
- Go Chase Yourself (1938)

Other films not listed by AFI

- I Surrender Dear (1931)
- Sing, Bing, Sing (1933)
