= Girl Crazy (1929 film) =

1929 film

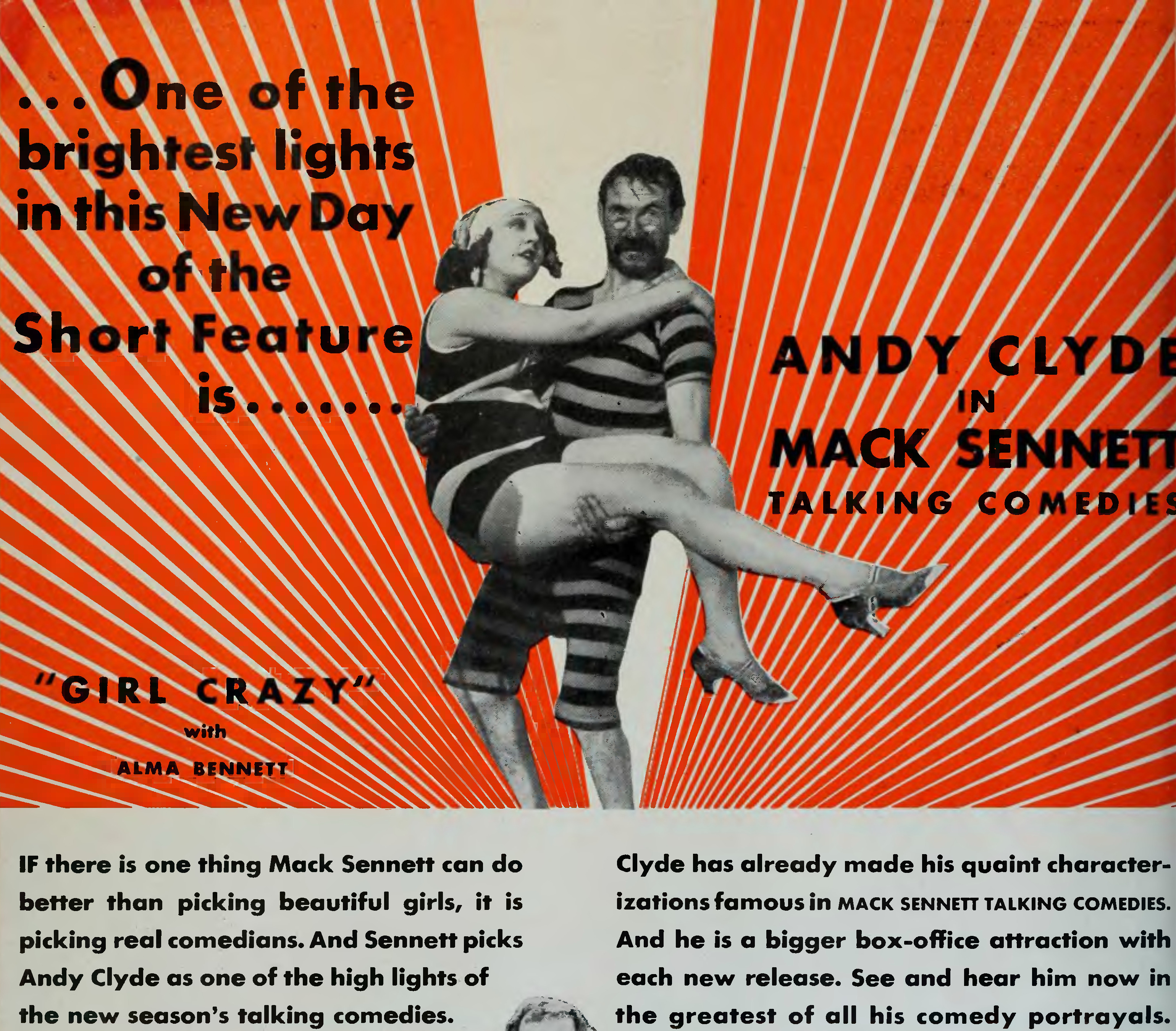
- Ad in The Film Daily, 1929
- Directed by: Mack Sennett
- Written by: John A. Waldron; Earle Rodney; Alfred J. Goulding
- Produced by: Mack Sennett
- Starring: Andy Clyde; Alma Bennett
- Cinematography: John W. Boyle; Ernie Crockett
- Edited by: William Hornbeck
- Color process: Silent; Black and White
- Production company: Mack Sennett Comedies
- Release date: June 9, 1929
- Running time: 20 minutes
- Country: United States
- Language: English

Girl Crazy was a 1929 comedy film directed by Mack Sennett and starring Andy Clyde as "a girl-crazy sexagenarian" and Alma Bennett as the woman he falls for. The film's story is credited to Hampton Del Ruth, Alfred J. Goulding, Harry McCoy, Earle Rodney, and Mack Sennett.

== Cast ==
- Andy Clyde as a Girl Crazy Sexagenarian
- Alma Bennett as Beatrice McCoy
- Vernon Dent as Elmer Salter
- Irving Bacon as Grandpa Salter
