= I Surrender Dear (1931 film) =

1931 film starring Bing Crosby

- Directed by: Mack Sennett
- Screenplay by: John A. Waldron; Earle Rodney; Harry McCoy
- Starring: Bing Crosby; Arthur Stone
- Cinematography: Charles P. Boyle; Mickey Whalen
- Edited by: William Hornbeck
- Production company: Atlantic Pictures Corporation
- Distributed by: Fox Film
- Release date: September 13, 1931
- Running time: 22 minutes
- Country: United States
- Language: English

I Surrender Dear is a 1931 Educational-Mack Sennett Featurette (No. S2094) starring Bing Crosby and directed by Mack Sennett. This was the first of the six short films Crosby made for Sennett and which helped launch his career as a solo performer.

== Background ==
Crosby, who was then one of The Rhythm Boys vocal group, had a chance meeting with Mack Sennett at the Lakeside Golf Club of Hollywood in the fall of 1930. Sennett was looking for a singer for his short films which had until recently been ‘silents’. Having seen Crosby and The Rhythm Boys perform at the Cocoanut Grove, he invited both Crosby and Donald Novis to audition for him. Sennett decided to take on the former and subsequently, in May 1931, Crosby signed a contract on behalf of the Rhythm Boys for a series of two-reel comedies. The Rhythm Boys were to be paid $1,000 a week while engaged in the filming ($18,823 in 2024 dollars). Within days, however, the Rhythm Boys walked out of their contact at the Cocoanut Grove and the three men decided to go their separate ways. Sennett renegotiated the contract amending the price to $600 ($11,294 in 2024 dollars) for Crosby instead of $1,000 for the trio. Six shorts were made by Crosby for Sennett, of which were four filmed in a three-month period in 1931 and two in 1932. The shorts were:

- I Surrender Dear (released September 1931)
- One More Chance (released November 1931)
- Dream House (released January 1932)
- Billboard Girl (released March 1932)
- Sing, Bing, Sing (released March 1933)
- Blue of the Night (released January 1933)

Crosby's records were selling very well when Sennett signed him and the first film under the contract – “I Surrender Dear” – wisely included three of his big hits.

== Plot ==
The film opens with a band, led by Crosby, playing “Out of Nowhere” for dancers in a night club after which it continues with “I Surrender Dear” which Crosby sings at a microphone. On board a train a girl named Peggy is listening to the broadcast and is reprimanded by her overbearing and ambitious mother for not being more appreciative of her chance to marry a Marquis, who happens to be sleeping noisily in the compartment.

The broadcast over, the singer and his friend Jerry (Arthur Stone) arrive at the railway station to meet Bing's sister whom he has not seen for a long time. Crosby mistakes Peggy from the train for her. He warmly greets Peggy and kisses her just as her mother and fiancé, the Marquis, arrive on the scene. After exchanging insults with Bing the enraged Marquis pulls a sword from his walking stick and chases him. Crosby nimbly runs away from the Marquis and jumps over an area of freshly-laid, hot asphalt but his pursuer fails the jump and lands knee deep in the asphalt.

Later Bing and his friend Jerry try to find Peggy, in whom Bing has become very interested, at her hotel and in another case of mistaken identity he angers a jealous Irish husband. After the Irishman punches Jerry, Bing refuses to be intimidated, calls his bluff and shapes up to him. The Irishman retires into his room abashed and returns to pull out a revolver which he fires at the two boys who depart rapidly.

Shortly afterwards Bing returns to Peggy's room and explains to her and her mother that he is not a ‘masher’ but he is in fact Bing Crosby, the radio crooner. At that moment a radio announcer says over the radio in the room that Bing Crosby is to sing “Out of Nowhere”. Peggy, of course, then disbelieves Bing who leaves angrily but when she hears the announcer say that he has just played a phonograph record she tries to find Bing. Encountering George Dobbs, a friend of Bing's in an adjacent room he invites her in but when he hears his jealous wife approaching with Bing and Jerry he hurriedly conceals Peggy in a closet. To the accompaniment of a band on the radio Bing sings “At Your Command” and Peggy, hearing his voice, leaves the closet and as they embrace he sings the last two lines of “I Surrender Dear”.

She rings the Marquis to cancel their engagement and leaves with Bing via the fire escape, hotly pursued by her mother and ex-fiancé. When a policeman stops them for speeding they tell him that they are on their way to be married and Bing proves his identity by singing “I Surrender Dear”. The policeman lets them go and when mother and the Marquis eventually trace them in a hotel, they find a marriage certificate pinned to the door of their room below a “Do not disturb” notice.

== Cast ==
- Bing – Bing Crosby
- Jerry – Arthur Stone
- Marquis – Luis Alberni
- Peggy's mother – Julia Griffith
- Peggy – Marion Sayers
- George Dobbs – Will Stanton
- Ethel Dobbs – Blanche Payson
- Chauncey McCullum (the Irishman) – Kalla Pasha
- Mrs. McCullum – Patsy O’Leary

== Reception ==
Variety welcomed it saying, inter alia: “Good two reeler extolling the vocal virtues of Bing Crosby suitably mixed up with laughs…Comedy brief permits explanatory reasons for Crosby’s singing with the title derived from the song of the same name, an important tune for this lad in his climb to prominence…They’ll like it all over and a standout amongst shorts…”.

Film Daily was not so impressed. “Mack Sennett has provided Bing Crosby with a semi-funny vehicle, bordering on the slapstick, that is bright at times and at other times dull…Unless you are a Crosby fan, it is just fair entertainment.”

== Soundtrack ==
- "I Surrender Dear"
- "At Your Command"
- "Out of Nowhere”
- "A Little Bit of Heaven" (Ernest R. Ball / J. Keirn Brennan)
