= Dream House (1932 film) =

1932 film

- Bing is thrown out of the film studios
- Directed by: Del Lord
- Screenplay by: John A. Waldron Earle Rodney; Harry McCoy Lew Foster
- Starring: Bing Crosby; Ann Christy; Vernon Dent
- Cinematography: Frank B. Good; Charles Van Enger
- Edited by: William Hornbeck
- Production company: Atlantic Pictures Corporation
- Distributed by: Fox Film
- Release date: January 17, 1932
- Running time: 19 minutes
- Country: United States
- Language: English

Dream House is a 1932 Educational-Mack Sennett Featurette (No. S2688) starring Bing Crosby and directed by Del Lord. This was the third of the six short films Crosby made for Sennett and which helped launch his career as a solo performer. Crooner's Holiday is the title it was reissued as in 1939.

== Background ==
Six shorts were made by Crosby for Mack Sennett, of which were four filmed in a three-month period in 1931 and two in 1932. The shorts were:

- I Surrender Dear (released September 1931)
- One More Chance (released November 1931)
- Dream House (released January 1932)
- Billboard Girl (released March 1932)
- Sing, Bing, Sing (released March 1933)
- Blue of the Night (released January 1933)

Crosby’s records were selling very well when Sennett signed him and “It Must Be True”, one of his big hits with Gus Arnheim was included in “Dream House”.

== Plot ==
Preparing to meet his girlfriend Betty, plumber Bing Fawcett sings in his bath and whilst dressing 'When I Take My Sugar to Tea'. Finding, however, that Betty and her mother have just left for the station en route to Hollywood, he follows and is in time to see her before the train leaves. He gives her an engagement ring and tells her that in three months their house will be completed and that if she hasn't then returned he will come and fetch her.

For several weeks Bing continues working on the house but there is no word from Betty until he receives a special delivery letter returning his ring and ending their engagement. It is, of course, from her mother who has, in Betty's name, returned the ring as she was hoping that her daughter would gain fame and fortune in films.

Betty has been given a leading role in an 'Eastern drama' being made by Monarch Film Studios and Bing arrives one day in search of her. When he asks for Betty and says that he is engaged to her, he is told that she is engaged to her leading man, Reginald Duncan, and Bing is ejected by the studio commissionaire. Seeking to get back into the studio, Bing climbs over a fence but the section is revolved by a painter and Bing finds himself still outside. He looks through a hole in the fence and gets black paint daubed over his face and this results in him being accidentally given a part as an African American in the film. Dressed in costume he stands over Betty and Reginald waving a large fan while he sings in blackface, 'It Must Be True'.

During the scene whilst the leading man, Reginald, is making love to Betty the lighting switch is kicked out by Bing who takes the opportunity under cover of darkness to hit Reginald with the fan. The scene breaks up and ignoring the protests of the director and Betty's mother, Bing explains that he hasn't had any letters from Betty except the one returning his ring. Betty points out that she has not received any letters from Bing either and they then realise that her mother has been withholding their letters.

Betty's mother chases Bing with an axe and he takes refuge in an enclosure containing the studio lion. Breaking down the door, Bing flees from the lion up a flight of stairs and hides in an old upright piano. The lion pursues him and also leaps into the piano which topples downstairs. Bing and the lion emerge from the shattered remains and Bing and Betty make their getaway in a car chased by her mother, the film director and studio officials. The lion jumps into the pursuing car but Betty's irate mother makes short work of him and the dazed animal is flung headlong out on to the road. Betty and Bing, still in studio costume but now in clean face, elude their pursuers as they drive away with Bing singing 'Dream House'.

== Cast ==
- Bing Crosby – Bing Fawcett
- Ann Christy – Betty Brooks
- Mrs. Brooks – Katherine Ward
- Eddie Phillips - Reginald Duncan
- Vernon Dent - Director Von Schnauble

== Reception ==
Variety commented: “…In this, as in its predecessors, Crosby goes through his paces with ease and naturalness and shows a good sense of comedy value…With the exception of the last bit, about a lion, which is given too much time, short is fast and contains enough comedy to get over anywhere. Besides which the Crosby billing should help…”

The Motion Picture Herald liked it too. “Bing Crosby who demonstrating his talent as a purveyor of melody, but lack of histrionic ability has the lead in this Sennett comedy effort. Several comedy situations of the slapstick variety draw a fair portion of laughs… All in all, a fairly good comedy.”

== Soundtrack ==
- "Dream House" (Earle Foxe / Lynn F. Cowan)
- "It Must Be True" (Harry Barris / Gus Arnheim / Gordon Clifford)
- "When I Take My Sugar to Tea” (Sammy Fain / Irving Kahal / Pierre Norman)
