= I Surrender Dear =

1931 song by Harry Barris and Gordon Clifford

Single by Gus Arnheim and His Cocoanut Grove Orchestra, vocal refrain by Bing Crosby
- B-side: "La Rosita"
- Published: 1931 Freed and Powers Ltd., EMI Mills Music Inc.
- Released: February 5, 1931
- Recorded: January 19, 1931 take 2
- Studio: Victor Hollywood Recording Studio, Studio 2, Los Angeles, California
- Genre: Jazz Big Band
- Length: 3.43
- Label: Victor 22618
- Composer: Harry Barris
- Lyricist: Gordon Clifford

"I Surrender Dear" (sometimes written as "I Surrender, Dear") is a song composed by Harry Barris with lyrics by Gordon Clifford, first performed by Gus Arnheim and His Cocoanut Grove Orchestra with Bing Crosby in 1931, which became his first solo hit. This is the song that caught the attention of William Paley, president of CBS, who signed Crosby for $600 a week in the fall of 1931 (equivalent to $13,000 a week in 2025).

In 1931, it was performed by Sam Lanin, as well as Ben Selvin, under the pseudonym "Mickie Alpert". It has been covered by many artists, making it a jazz and pop standard. The first jazz vocalist to record the song was Louis Armstrong in 1931.

"I Surrender Dear" inspired two motion pictures bearing that title: a 1931 Bing Crosby musical short I Surrender Dear produced by Mack Sennett, and a 1948 feature film starring one of Crosby's co-stars, singer Gloria Jean. An instrumental 1930s-esque jazz cover of this song was recorded for the 1996 movie Kansas City as part of the soundtrack. This song was also the comical introduction to the pre-code film The Tip Off in 1931, in which actor Eddie Quillan is a window singer at a radio repair shop. He mouths the song while it is being played over a new "Human Voice Amplifier".

== Renditions ==
- Louis Armstrong recorded April 20, 1931
- Sam Lanin - Recorded May 21, 1931
- Ben Selvin, featuring Helen Rowland - Recorded February 6, 1931
- Bing Crosby – I Surrender Dear: first recorded January 19, 1931, with Gus Arnheim and His Cocoanut Grove Orchestra; "I Surrender Dear" (Sennett short soundtrack 1931); Recorded March 31, 1939, with John Scott Trotter and His Orchestra; Recorded April 24, 1954, with Buddy Cole and His Trio for use in Bing: A Musical Autobiography.
- Charlie Spivak - I Surrender Dear Okeh 6546 (1942)
- Tyree Glenn – I Surrender Dear/The House of parting edited by Blue Star French label (1947)
- Django Reinhardt – Django in Rome 1949/1950 (1950)
- Nat King Cole – Penthouse Serenade (1952)
- Herman's Norwegian Jazz group Soloist: Rowland Greenberg - Recorded on December 3, 1954, and re-released on the extended play Odeon GEON 2
- Ray Charles – The Great Ray Charles (1957)
- Thelonious Monk – Brilliant Corners (1957), Solo Monk (1965)
- Terry Snyder and the All Stars – Persuasive Percussion (1959)
- Paul Gonsalves – Gettin' Together! (1960)
- Aretha Franklin – The Electrifying Aretha Franklin (1962)- This recording peaked at #87 on the US Hot 100.
- Lena Horne - Lena...Lovely and Alive (1962)
- Harry James - In A Relaxed Mood (MGM E-4274, 1965)
- Count Basie – Basie Swingin' Voices Singin' (1966)
- Julie London – Nice Girls Don't Stay for Breakfast (1967)
- Ella Fitzgerald – Jazz at Santa Monica Civic '72 (1972)
- Roy Eldridge – Roy Eldridge 4 - Montreux '77 (1977)
- Chet Atkins and Les Paul – Guitar Monsters (1978)
- Abdullah Ibrahim – Autobiography (1978)
- Madonna and Jennifer Grey – Bloodhounds of Broadway soundtrack (1989)
- Howard Fishman - I Like You A Lot (2001)
- Elvis Costello with Vince Giordano & the Nighthawks Orchestra - Boardwalk Empire Soundtrack - Volume 3 (2014)
- Peter Brötzmann - I Surrender Dear (2019)

== Popular culture ==
- The song is referenced in the 1949 war film Battleground, which depicts the hardships of American troops attempting to hold the town of Bastogne in late December 1944, during the Battle of the Bulge. German radio is heard broadcasting the song to the entrenched American troops to demoralize them. This psychological warfare is shown to have the opposite effect on the GIs, who hum along (to the old chestnut), but prefer to hear real American radio.

== See also ==
- List of 1930s jazz standards
