= Albert Hay Malotte =

American composer and keyboard player (1895–1964)

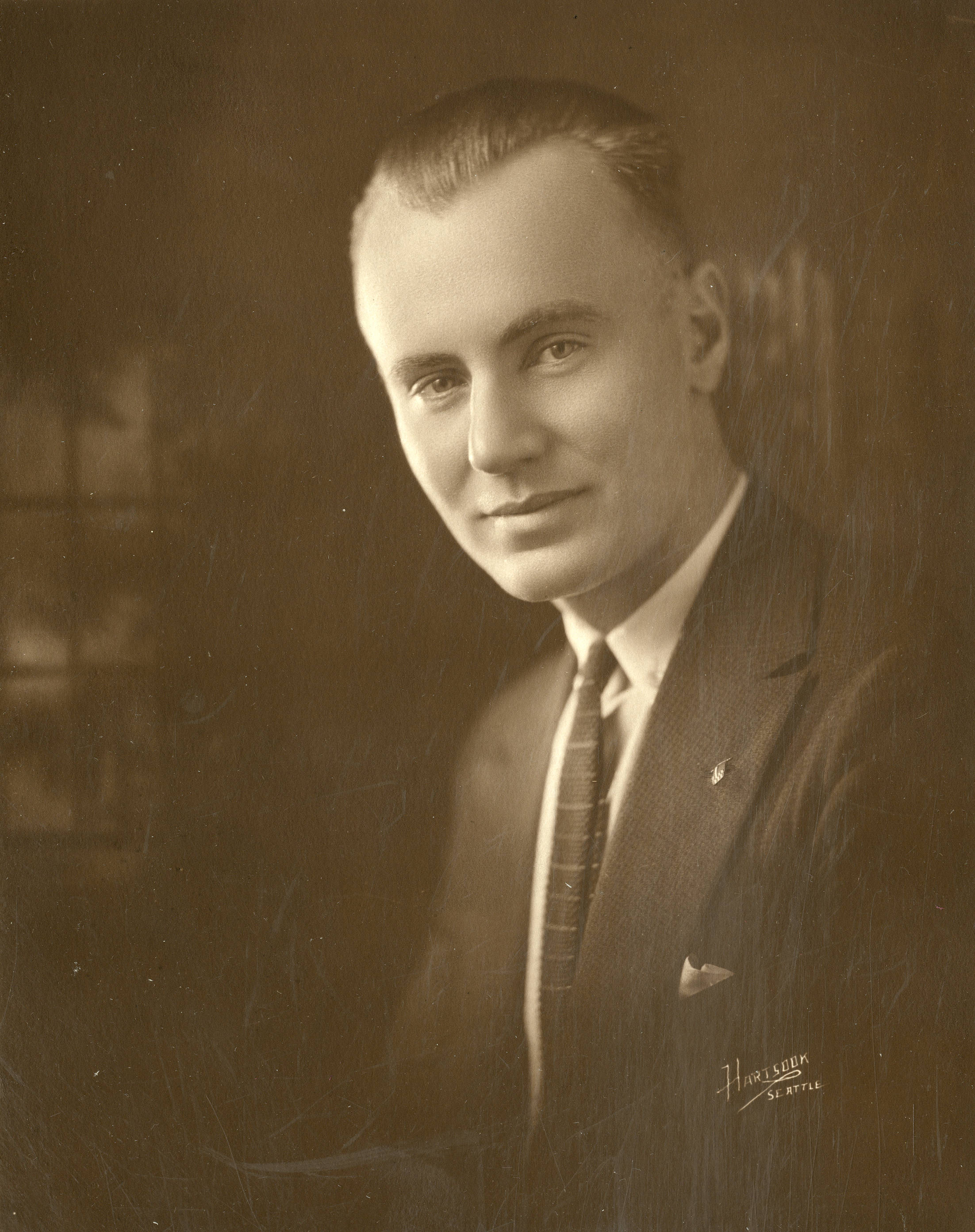
- Born: May 19, 1895; Philadelphia, Pennsylvania, U.S.
- Died: November 16, 1964 (aged 69); Los Angeles, California, U.S.
- Resting place: Forest Lawn Memorial Park, Hollywood Hills
- Occupations: Composer, musician
- Spouses: Elmina Todd, Marguerite Stevens Hester

Albert Hay Malotte (May 19, 1895 – November 16, 1964) was an American pianist, organist, composer and educator, best known for his musical setting of "The Lord's Prayer".

== Biography and career ==
Malotte was the son of Charles and Katherine (Donavon) Malotte. He was in Boy Scouts of America Troop 1, the first Boy Scout troop in Philadelphia. Malotte graduated from Tioga High School and sang at Saint James Episcopal Church in Philadelphia as a choir boy. He studied with Victor Herbert, W. S. Stansfield, and later in Paris with organist Georges Jacob. His career as an organist began in Chicago where he played for silent pictures, and he later concertized throughout the US and Europe.

During World War II he held the rank of captain in the Special Services for two years while he toured with the USO and entertained troops in New Guinea, Australia and Europe. At one point he sponsored his own troupe of entertainers that included Judith Anderson, Anne Triola and Helen McClure Preister. Malotte was an amateur pilot, avid golfer and even boxed with Jack Dempsey in Memphis, Tennessee. He spent most of his career as a composer in Hollywood.

Malotte married Marguerite Stevens Hester on August 23, 1946. His first wife, Elmina Todd, had died the previous year in Hollywood.

Malotte composed a number of film scores, including mostly uncredited music for animations from the Disney studios. Although two movies for which he composed scores won best Short Subject Academy Awards (Ferdinand the Bull in 1939 and The Ugly Duckling in 1940), he is best remembered for a setting of "The Lord's Prayer". Written in 1935, it was first recorded by baritone John Charles Thomas, and has remained popular in churches, concerts and recordings. Malotte composed a number of other religious pieces, including settings of the Beatitudes and of the Twenty-third Psalm which have also remained popular as solos. His secular songs, such as "Ferdinand the Bull" (from the Disney animated short of the same name), "For my mother" (a setting of a poem by 12-year-old Bobby Sutherland) and "I am proud to be an American" are less well remembered. Some of his works are collected in the library of the University of California Los Angeles and the Library of Congress.

In addition, Malotte wrote uncredited stock music for many other films in the 1930s and early 1940s, including twenty-two of Disney's Silly Symphonies and other shorts, among them Little Hiawatha and Ferdinand the Bull. He also composed cantatas, oratorios, musicals and ballets. Malotte owned Apple Valley Music.

One of his most odd compositions is "Fiesta en Purchena", a piece for piano composed in 1938 and published by G. Schirmer. Malotte wrote in the first page of the score why he composed this piece based on a historical event called Moorish Games (in Spanish: Juegos Moriscos) which happened in 1569 in Purchena, a small Spanish town to which he had never gone. This is the explanation:

FIESTA EN PURCHENA was suggested to me by the following quotation from Eleanor Hague's very interesting book Music in Ancient Arabia and Spain. In a chapter dealing with Moorish festivals, she relates that "The Moors who most vitally maintained their tradition were those of the kingdom of Granada, the last stronghold of Islamism in the peninsula." The most vivid pictures of the music festivals celebrated in the kingdom are to be found in the works of Ginés Pérez de Hita. As an example I give the following, which shows the subtlety, orderliness, and elegance of their artistic contests: "The plaza of Purchena was ready for the dances, with many carpets spread; all the important people were seated round about with Ibn Humeya on a dais, and lute and timbrel in place. Many Moorish youths, beautifully dressed, danced, one by one, marvelously well. Thereafter followed various cavaliers, dancing with lovely Moorish ladies."

There are no biographies or studies of Malotte's life and compositions in English, but there is a short one in Spanish published by Purchena's Town Council in 2013, with the institutional support of the United States Embassy in Spain, written by the musician Bartolomé Llorens Peset. This book, called Fiesta en Purchena: Los Juegos Moriscos de Aben Humeya en la obra del compositor estadounidense Albert Hay Malotte, also encloses a recording of "Fiesta in Purchena" performed by Tomeu Moll, a pianist from Valencia.

Malotte died of pneumonia in 1964 and is buried in Forest Lawn Memorial Park, Hollywood Hills.

== Works and productions ==
=== Selected filmography ===
- Black Magic (Director: George B. Seitz, 1929)
- Such Men Are Dangerous (1930)
- Born Reckless (Directors: Andrew Bennison and John Ford, 1930)
- The Girl from Calgary (Director: Phil Whitman, 1932)
- Hi, Gaucho! (Director: Tommy Atkins, 1935)
- Dr. Cyclops (Director: Ernest B. Schoedsack, 1940)
- Mystery Sea Raider (Director: Edward Dmytryk, 1940)
- Pirates on Horseback (Director: Lesley Selander, 1941)
- The Enchanted Forest (Director: Lew Landers, 1945)
- The Big Fisherman (Director: Frank Borzage, 1959)

=== Disney scores (incomplete) ===
- Alpine Climbers
- Brave Little Tailor
- Broken Toys
- Ferdinand the Bull
- Little Hiawatha
- Lonesome Ghosts
- Magician Mickey
- Mickey's Elephant
- The Moth and the Flame
- Moving Day
- Orphan's Picnic
- Three Blind Mouseketeers
- The Ugly Duckling
- The Whalers

=== Ballets (complete) ===
- Carnival in Venice
- Little Red Riding Hood

=== Musicals (all unpublished) ===
- Lolama (premiered in Phoenix, AZ)
- The Big Tree - Gee What A Tree (with Rowland Vance Lee)
- Bluebeard (with Rowland Vance Lee)
- Limbo or Ladies from Limbo (with Irving Phillips)
- Fanfare
- Soldiers in Overalls

=== Piano rolls (known) ===
- Bring Back The Old Fashioned Waltz, QRS 2488
- Someday I'll Forget (That I Ever Loved You), QRS 2387

=== Songs, sacred and secular (incomplete; published) ===
- A happily married pair
- A little song of life
- A voice from outer space
- A woman must have love
- After we have kissed (from Ladies from Limbo, 1947)
- All because of love (from Ladies from Limbo, 1947)
- Among the living (1939)
- An Understanding Heart (1959)
- And have not charity
- At the crossroads (setting of Richard Hovey poem, 1941)
- Beatitudes, The
- Big Fisherman, The
- Blow Me Eyes (1941)
- Bob-o-Link
- Bridal Hymn
- Bring back that old-fashioned waltz ("dedicated to my folks", 1923)
- Brotherhood (1950)
- C'est l'amour
- Chant pastoral
- Cinderella
- Contrary Mary (1936)
- David & Goliath
- Desire (1942)
- Devotedly
- Double crossed by the moon (I'm always)
- Dreamer, The (setting of 1928 Don Blanding poem from his "Vagabond's House", 1936)
- Faith
- Farewell (1942)
- Ferdinand the Bull
- Fiesta en purchena
- For my mother (setting of Bobby Sutherland poem, 1939)
- Forgive me (1941)
- From a foxhole
- Go, lovely rose (1936)
- Golfer's lament (theme song for the Joe Kirkwood TV show, "Let's play golf")
- Gown of glory
- Great sea, The
- Hast thou not known? (from the oratorio Voice of the Prophet)
- Heartstrings (1941)
- Hebrew prayer (written for the New Temple Israel, 1951)
- Holy Bible, The
- Homing heart, The
- How shall my heart remember?
- Hymn to the D.A.R.
- I am proud to be an American
- I pledge my love to you (1951 - Dedicated to Mrs. Malotte - 8/23/46)
- If I listen to my heart
- It took me forever to find you
- It's good to know
- I've been here before
- Just an ordinary guy
- Just let me know
- Life eternal
- Lord's Prayer, The
- Lover, The (poem anonymous, 1936)
- Marguerite
- May dance
- Maybe perhaps
- Melancholy Moon
- Melody of my heart
- Melody of my love (1939)
- Mimi and her Fifi
- Miracle
- Mister Jim (1944)
- My fascinating girl
- My friend (1939)
- My love for you
- Ninety-first Psalm, The (for solo voice and full chorus, 1941)
- O the fierce delight (1940)
- Ode to liberty
- Old age (1945)
- One, two, three (1939)
- Only with Thine Eyes (Psalm 91 - solo)
- Pledge to the Flag (1940)
- Poor old man, The
- Positive thinking (1960)
- Psalm 23
- Same old story, The
- Separation (1941)
- Sing a Song of Sixpence (1938)
- Someday I'll Forget That I Ever Loved You
- Song of the open road (1935)
- Sound of the trumpet
- Spread your wings (1943)
- Sunday morning on the Rue de la Paix
- Swashbuckler's song (1936)
- Tell the world to move over
- Time-clock, The
- Three songs to poems by Edith
- To a skylark (1940)
- Treat 'em rough, soldier boy! (1942)
- Twenty-third Psalm, The
- Unto thee, O Lord
- Upstream (setting of 1922 Carl Sandburg poem from "Slabs of the Sunburnt West", 1937)
- Voice of the Prophet (Chorus, Orchestra, & Soloists)
- We want to see everything
- Wedding day
- Wee Hughie (words by Elizabeth Shane, 1946)
- What can I ask more of life? (words by Rowland Vance Lee, 1948)
- What Would Be the Use of Living?
- When my boy comes home (1944)
- When you fall in love
- Without a man to love
- Yearning Just For You
