= Harry C. Myers =

American actor (1882–1938)

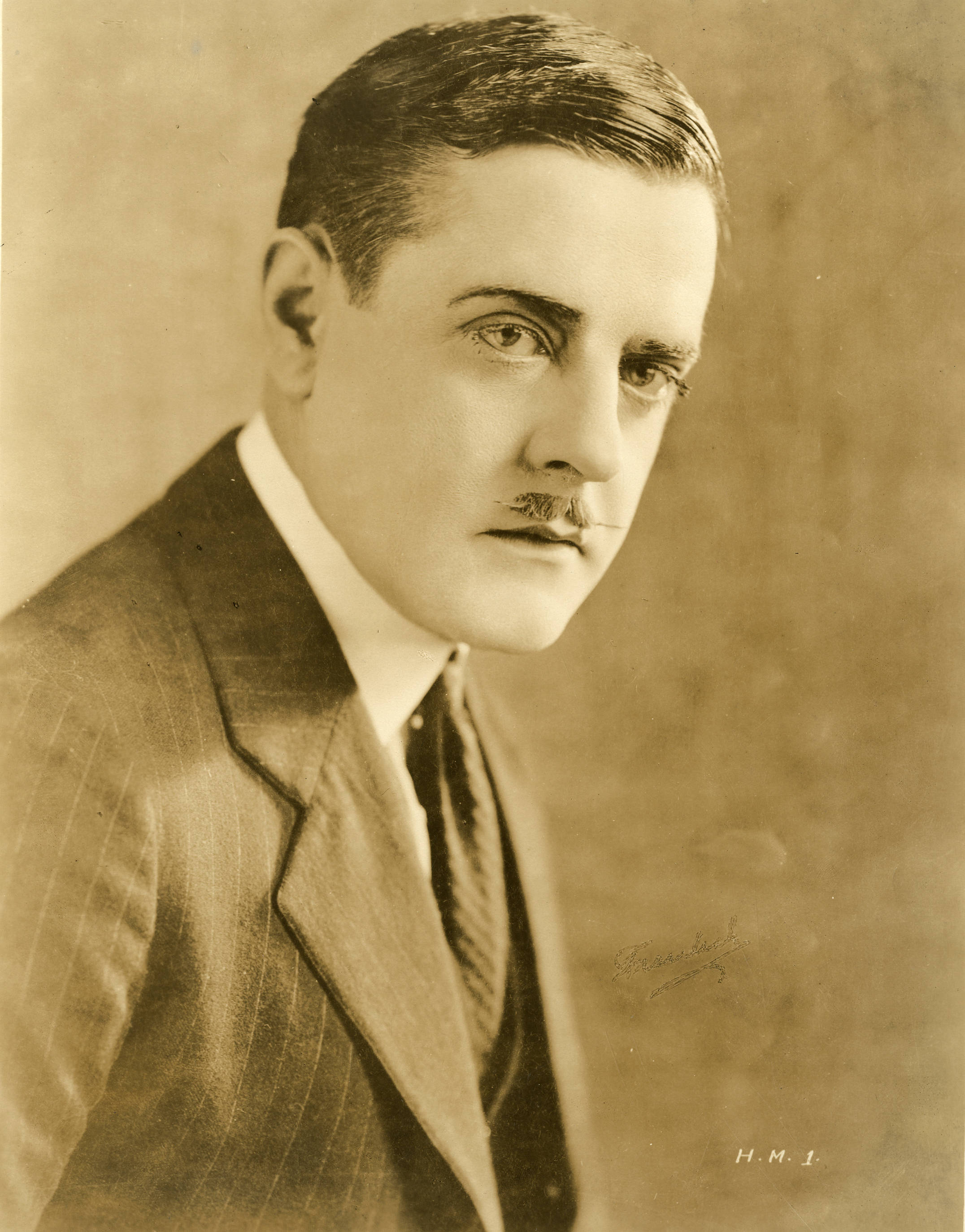
- Myers in 1924
- Born: September 5, 1882; New Haven, Connecticut, U.S.
- Died: December 25, 1938 (aged 56); Hollywood, California, U.S.
- Other name: Henry Myers
- Occupations: Actor; film director
- Years active: 1908–1938
- Spouse: Rosemary Theby (m. 1915)

Harry C. Myers (September 5, 1882 – December 25, 1938) was an American film actor and director, sometimes credited as Henry Myers. He performed in many short comedy films with his wife Rosemary Theby. Myers appeared in 330 films between 1908 and 1939, and directed more than 50 films between 1913 and 1917.

== Biography ==
Myers was born on September 5, 1882, in New Haven, Connecticut. When he was young, he moved to Philadelphia, where he received most of his education. He studied drawing and design at the Philadelphia Art School for three years. Turning from art to drama, he acted for two years with the Girard Avenue Stock Company and with other troupes in subsequent years.

Myers had been a theatre actor for 10 years before he went into films as an actor for Siegmund Lubin's Lubin Studios in 1909. By 1914, he was directing his own comedy shorts featuring him and his wife, Rosemary Theby, for Universal, the Vim Comedy Company, and Pathé studios.

After 1920 he had many starring roles in feature-length films, the most notable of which was as the eccentric alcoholic millionaire in Charlie Chaplin's City Lights (1931). His career declined after the introduction of sound films.

Myers died on December 25, 1938, in Hollywood, California, at age 56, from pneumonia.

== Partial filmography ==
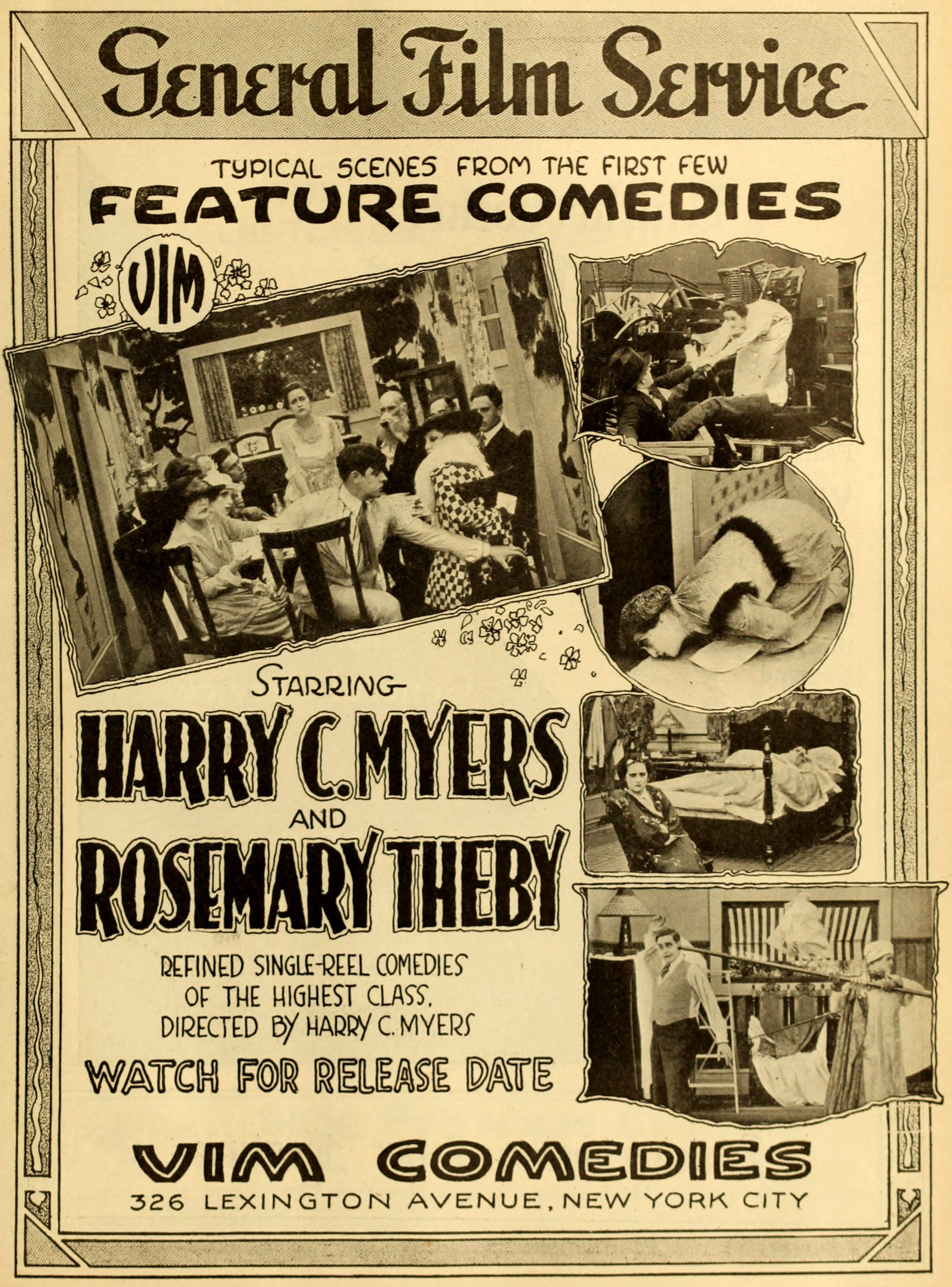
Advertisement (1916)

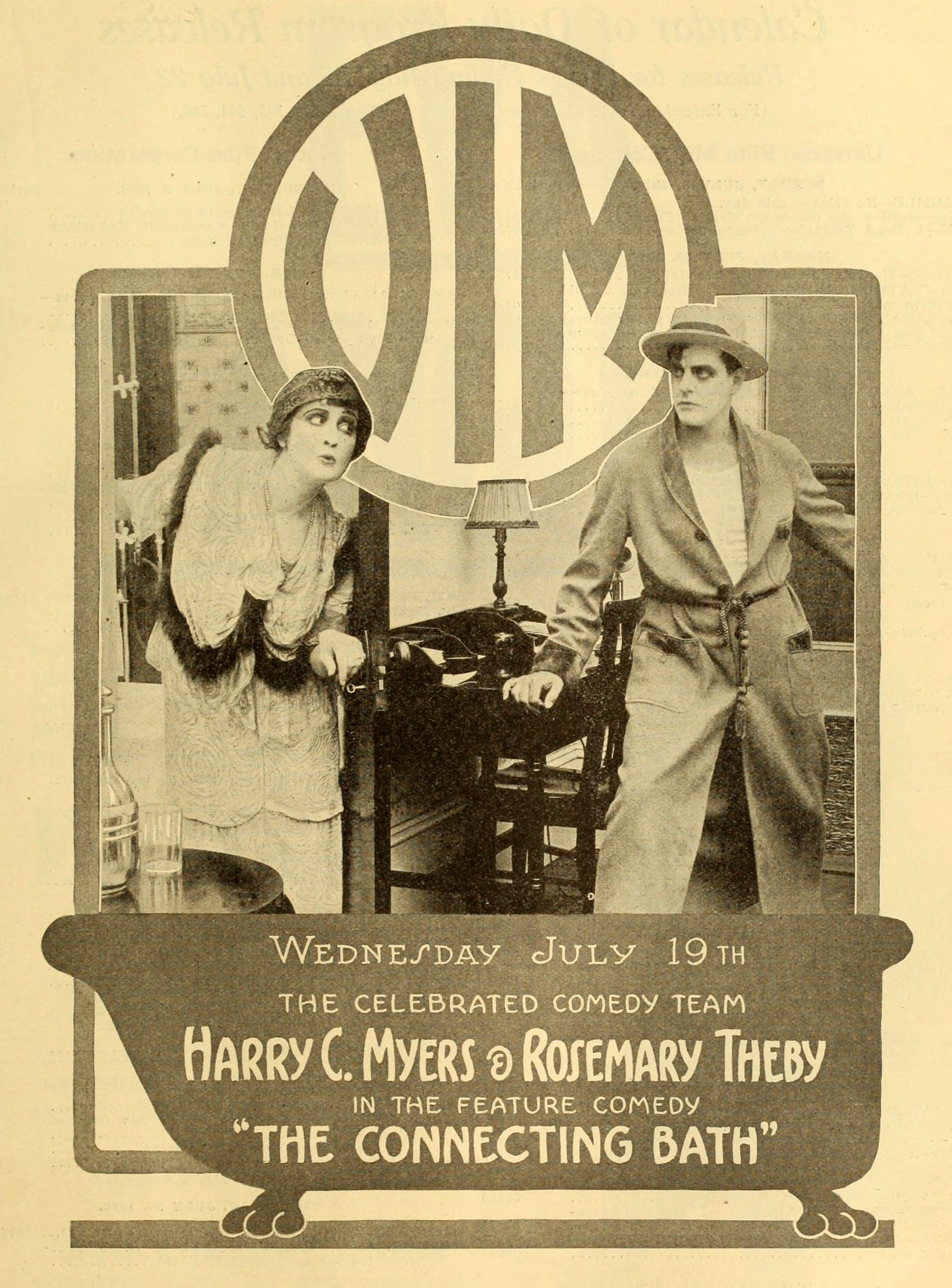
The Connecting Bath (1916)

- The Almighty Dollar (1910, Short) – Effeminate Gentleman
- When the Earth Trembled (1913) – Paul Girard Jr.
- Baby (1915, Short) – Harry – the Husband
- The Earl of Pawtucket (1915) – Arthur Weatherbee
- The Man of Shame (1915) – Lt. Du Fresne
- The Face in the Dark (1918) – Jim Weaver
- Conquered Hearts (1918) – Stonne
- Out of the Night (1918) – Ralph Evanns
- The Masked Rider (1919) – Harry Burrel
- The Wildcatter (1919)
- A Modern Lochinvar (1919)
- Sky-Eye (1920) – Harry Mangin
- The Notorious Mrs. Sands (1920) – Grey Sands
- 45 Minutes from Broadway (1920) – Daniel Cronin
- Peaceful Valley (1920) – Ward Andrews
- The Prospector's Vengeance (1920, Short)
- A Connecticut Yankee in King Arthur's Court (1921) – The Yankee / Martin Cavendish
- On the High Card (1921) – Harry Holt
- The March Hare (1921) – Tod Rollins
- Oh Mary Be Careful (1921) – Bobby Burns
- Nobody's Fool (1921) – Artemis Alger
- R.S.V.P. (1921) – Benny Fielding
- Why Trust Your Husband? (1921) – Elmer Day
- Handle with Care (1922) – Ned Picard
- Turn to the Right (1922) – Gilly
- When the Lad Came Home (1922)
- Boy Crazy (1922) – J. Smythe
- The Adventures of Robinson Crusoe (1922, Serial) – Robinson Crusoe
- Kisses (1922) – Bill Bailey
- Top o' the Morning (1922) – John Garland
- In the Days of Buffalo Bill (1922) – Andrew Johnson
- The Beautiful and Damned (1922) – Dick
- Brass (1923) – Wilbur Lansing
- Main Street (1923) – Dave Dyer
- The Brass Bottle (1923) – Horace Ventimore
- Little Johnny Jones (1923) – The Chauffeur
- The Printer's Devil (1923) – Sidney Fletcher
- The Common Law (1923) – Cardemon
- The Bad Man (1923) – Red Giddings
- Stephen Steps Out (1923) – Harry Stetson
- The Marriage Circle (1924) – Detective
- Daddies (1924) – Robert Audrey
- Listen Lester (1924) – Listen Lester
- Behold This Woman (1924) – Eugene de Seyre
- Tarnish (1924) – The Barber
- Reckless Romance (1924) – Christopher Skinner
- She Wolves (1925) – Henri de Latour
- Zander the Great (1925) – Texas
- Grounds for Divorce (1925) – Count Zappata
- Trails End (1925) – Harry Kenyon
- The Nutcracker (1926) – Oscar Briggs
- The Beautiful Cheat (1926) – Jimmy Austin
- Monte Carlo (1926) – Greves
- Up in Mabel's Room (1926) – Jimmie Larchmont
- Get 'Em Young (1926, Short) – Orvid Joy
- Exit Smiling (1926) – Jesse Watson
- The First Night (1927) – Hotel Detective
- Getting Gertie's Garter (1927) – Jimmy Felton
- The Bachelor's Baby (1927) – Bill Taylor
- The Girl in the Pullman (1927) – Jimmy Mason
- The Dove (1927) – Mike
- The Chinatown Mystery (1928)
- The Street of Illusion (1928) – Lew Fielding
- Dream of Love (1928) – The Baron
- The Clean Up (1929) – Jimmy
- Montmartre Rose (1929)
- Wonder of Women (1929) – Bruno Heim
- City Lights (1931) – Eccentric Millionaire
- Meet the Wife (1931) – Harvey Lennox
- Convicted (1931) – Sturgeon
- A Strange Adventure (1932) – Police Officer Ryan
- The Savage Girl (1932) – Amos P. Stitch
- Damaged Lives (1933) – Nat Franklin
- The Important Witness (1933) – Drunk
- Mary Stevens, M.D. (1933) – Nervous Patient (uncredited)
- Police Call (1933) – Steward
- Rainbow Over Broadway (1933) – Berwiskey
- Managed Money (1934, Short) – Mr. George Rogers
- Allez Oop (1934, Short) – Circus Spectator
- We Live Again (1934) – Bailiff (uncredited)
- Mississippi (1935) – Stage Manager (uncredited)
- Barbary Coast (1935) – Saloon Patron (uncredited)
- The Calling of Dan Matthews (1935) – Club Owner (uncredited)
- The Milky Way (1936) – Photographer at Apartment (uncredited)
- F-Man (1936) – Man in Group (uncredited)
- One Rainy Afternoon (1936) – Man in Theatre (uncredited)
- San Francisco (1936) – Reveler (uncredited)
- Kelly the Second (1936) – Fight Spectator with Cigars (uncredited)
- Hollywood Boulevard (1936) – Harry Myers – Actor at Trocadero Bar
- Lady Be Careful (1936) – Passerby (uncredited)
- Mr. Cinderella (1936) – Man at Party Helping Splashed Woman (uncredited)
- Mixed Magic (1936, Short) – (uncredited)
- Rich Relations (1937)
- Parnell (1937) – Man in Courtroom (uncredited)
- A Day at the Races (1937) – Party Guest (uncredited)
- Walter Wanger's Vogues of 1938 (1937) – Husband (uncredited)
- Double or Nothing (1937) – Nightclub Patron (uncredited)
- Dangerously Yours (1937) – Costume Ball Participant (uncredited)
- Stand-In (1937) – Bank Board Member (uncredited)
- The Adventures of Tom Sawyer (1938) – Irate Churchgoer (uncredited)
- A Slight Case of Murder (1938) – Partygoer (uncredited)
- Dangerous to Know (1938) – Guest at Party (uncredited)
- Racket Busters (1938) – Court Stenographer (uncredited)
- Block-Heads (1938) – Drunk (uncredited)
- The Spider's Web (1938, Serial) – Detective (uncredited)
- Kentucky (1938) – Dancer (uncredited)
- The Oklahoma Kid (1939) – Banker (uncredited)
- I'm from Missouri (1939) – Mule Man (uncredited)
- Zenobia (1939) – Party Guest Who Didn't Mind (uncredited)
