= The Almighty Dollar =

Almighty Dollar is a cultural concept

The Almighty Dollar may also refer to:

- The Almighty Dollar (1910 film)
- The Almighty Dollar (1916 film)
- The Almighty Dollar (1923 film)
- The Almighty Dollar, Campbell Summer Soundstage 1954
- Almighty Dollar, album by Rod Piazza 2011
- "The Almighty Dollar", song by Ozzy Osbourne from Black Rain (Ozzy Osbourne album)
- "The Almighty Dollar", song by Devin the Dude from Waitin' to Inhale
