= The Girl from Calgary =

1932 film

- Directed by: Phil Whitman
- Written by: Lee Chadwick (continuity); Lee Chadwick (dialogue); Leon D'Usseau (story); Sid Schlager (story)
- Produced by: I. E. Chadwick
- Cinematography: Harry Neumann
- Edited by: Carl Pierson
- Music by: Albert Hay Malotte
- Production company: Chadwick Pictures
- Distributed by: Monogram Studios
- Release date: October 24, 1932
- Running time: 64 minutes
- Country: United States
- Language: English

The Girl from Calgary is a 1932 American pre-Code musical comedy film directed by Phil Whitman, and starring Fifi D'Orsay and Paul Kelly.

== Plot summary ==
A French-Canadian girl is a champion bronc rider and is also a nightclub singer. An ambitious young man sees her act one night and is struck by her talent, realizing that she is good enough to become a Broadway star.

He convinces her to accompany him to New York, where she indeed does become a Broadway star. However, the young man finds himself being squeezed out by greedy Broadway producers who see the talented young girl as their own personal gold mine.

== Cast ==
- Fifi D'Orsay as Fifi Follette
- Paul Kelly as Larry Boyd
- Robert Warwick as Bill Webster
- Edwin Maxwell as Earl Darrell
- Astrid Allwyn as Mazie Williams
- Edward Fetherston as Monte Cooper
- Adrienne Dore as Lulu, Darrell's secretary (uncredited)

== Production background ==
- The first reel, with an elaborate musical number, is taken from The Great Gabbo (1929) which had at least one sequence filmed in Multicolor.
- When originally released, the first reel of The Girl From Calgary, approximately seven minutes including the title credits, was in 2-strip Magnacolor. Reviewers at the time commented on the poor quality of the color, registration problems, and lack of focus. In surviving prints, this sequence is in black-and-white, with a replaced title card that includes a 1951 copyright statement.

== See also ==
- List of early color feature films
