= Alta Allen =

American actress

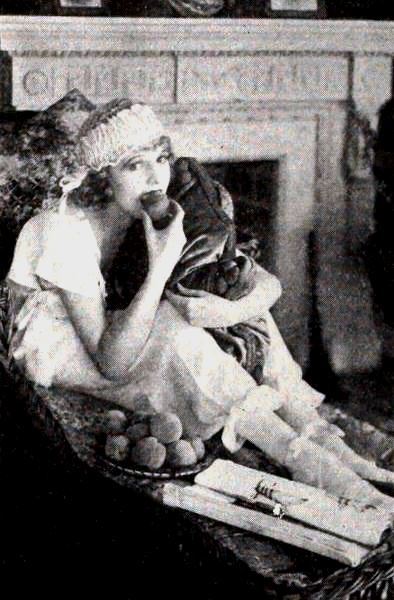
- Allen in 1920
- Born: Alta Crowin; September 6, 1904; Oakland, California, U.S.
- Died: July 24, 1998 (aged 93); Boonsboro, Maryland, U.S.
- Occupation: Actress
- Years active: 1921 – 1926
- Spouse: Hampton Del Ruth (m. 1920 – ?)

Alta Allen (born Alta Crowin) (September 6, 1904 – July 24, 1998) was an American actress.

== Early years ==
Allen was born as Alta Crowin in Oakland, California in 1904 to a Scottish mother, Jessie (née Robertson), and W. J. Crowin, who hailed from the West Coast. She made her first professional performance at an Oakland theater in a production of Louisa May Alcott's Little Women. Allen's role in this production was as Beth March. She was ten years old at the time.

Allen was "one of the most popular of Oakland's younger social set."

== Career ==
Allen's early professional experience included acting in stock theater in Oakland and directing and performing in the Fairmont's Rainbow Lane revue.

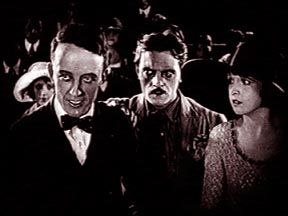
Allen in a scene from Seven Years Bad Luck (1921)

In 1920, William Fox, the founder of the Fox Film Corporation, observed Allen as she performed the leading role at a musical revue within the Fairmont Hotel. Subsequently, she signed a contract with his studios, although she would only perform one role in any silent film released by Fox Film: the 1921 comedy Skirts. She would subsequently sign a contract with Universal Studios, and later appeared in several films released by this corporation, including The Marriage Chance (1922), and A Self-Made Failure (1924). Her final credited screen appearance occurred in 1926, as Thora Barton in the cast of The Set-Up.

== Personal life and death ==
On November 25, 1920, Allen married actor, screenwriter, and director Hampton Del Ruth (the couple later divorced). She died of natural causes at her Boonsboro home on June 24, 1998, the age of 93.

== Filmography ==
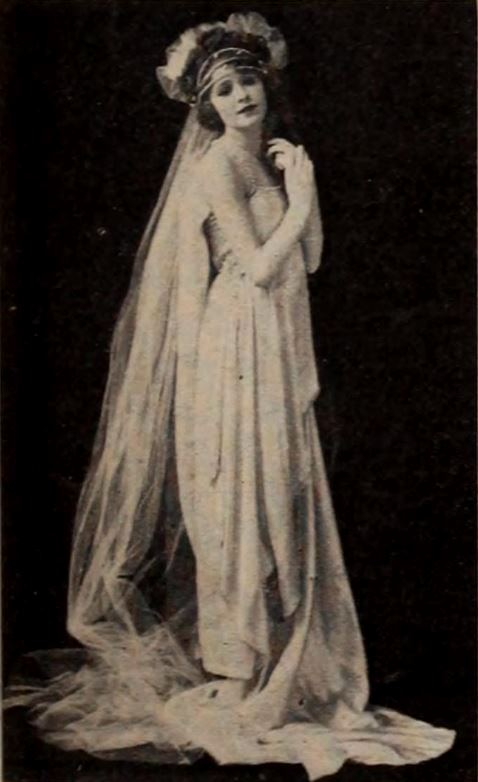
Allen, pictured at age 15 in a film still for the silent film, Skirts

Year	Film	Role	Notes
1921	A Shocking Night	Bessie Lane	Lost film
1921	Seven Years Bad Luck	Betty	Max's Fiancée
1921	Be My Wife	Mary	The subject of the main characters' affections
1921	Skirts	Kidnapped girl	Lost film
1922	The Marriage Chance	Eleanor Douglas	Lost film
1924	A Self-Made Failure	Mrs. Spike Malone	Alternative title: The Goof; Lost film
1924	Daring Chances	Agnes Rushton	Lost film
1926	The Set-Up	Thora Barton	Daughter of Cliff Barton, the murder victim Lost film
1926	Raggedy Rose	Rose's former co-worker	Uncredited role
