= The Mystery Train (film) =

1931 film

- Theatrical poster for film
- Directed by: Phil Whitman
- Written by: Hampton Del Ruth (story and scenario); Phil Whitman (story and scenario)
- Produced by: Larry Darmour (producer)
- Starring: See below
- Cinematography: James S. Brown Jr.
- Edited by: Dwight Caldwell
- Release date: August 1, 1931
- Running time: 62 minutes
- Country: United States
- Language: English

The Mystery Train is a 1931 American film directed by Phil Whitman.

== Plot ==
Marian Radcliffe and William Mortimer (her lawyer) help Joan Lane, who was wrongly convicted, escape from police custody after a train wreck. Radcliffe then uses Lane in a scheme to have her marry Ronald Stanhope; so Marian can avoid having to declare bankruptcy after she lost heavily in the stock market.

== Cast ==
- Hedda Hopper as Mrs. Marian Radcliffe
- Marceline Day as Joan Lane
- Nick Stuart as Ronald Stanhope
- Bryant Washburn as William Mortimer
- Al Cooke as The Bridegroom
- Mary MacLaren as Nurse
- Carol Tevis as The Bride
- Joseph W. Girard as Sheriff
- Spec O'Donnell as Caddy
- Eddie Fetherston as Archie Benson
