= A Self-Made Failure =

1924 film by William Beaudine

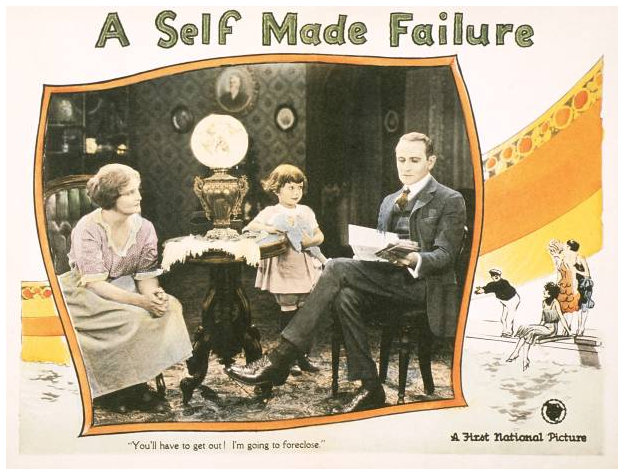
- Lobby card
- Directed by: William Beaudine
- Written by: Tamar Lane (adaptation); Violet Clark (scenario); Lex Neal (scenario); John Grey (scenario)
- Story by: J. K. McDonald
- Produced by: J. K. McDonald
- Starring: Lloyd Hamilton
- Cinematography: Ray June; Barney McGill
- Edited by: H. P. Bretherton; Beth Matz
- Distributed by: Associated First National Pictures
- Release date: June 29, 1924
- Running time: 8 reels (7,345 feet)
- Country: United States
- Language: Silent (English intertitles)

A Self-Made Failure is a 1924 American silent comedy film distributed by Associated First National Pictures, later First National Pictures. It was directed by William Beaudine and starred silent comic Lloyd Hamilton and then child actor Ben Alexander. At the time it was released, it one of the longest comedy features ever made.

== Cast ==
- Lloyd Hamilton as Breezy, The Failure
- Ben Alexander as Sonny
- Matt Moore as John Steele
- Patsy Ruth Miller as Alice Neal
- Mary Carr as Grandma Neal
- Sam De Grasse as Cyrus Cruikshank
- Charles Reisner as Spike Malone (credited as Chuck Reisner)
- Victor Potel as Pokey Jones
- Dan Mason as Dan
- Harry Todd as The Constable
- Alta Allen as Mrs. Spike Malone
- Doris Duane as The Waitress
- Priscilla Moran as Alice Neal, age 4
- Joe McGray as Vermin
- Cameo the Dog as himself, Cameo

unbilled

- Monte Collins - ?
- Dot Farley - ?

== Preservation ==
A Self-Made Failure is currently presumed lost. In February 2021, the film was cited by the National Film Preservation Board on their Lost U.S. Silent Feature Films list.
