= The Galloping Kid =

1922 film

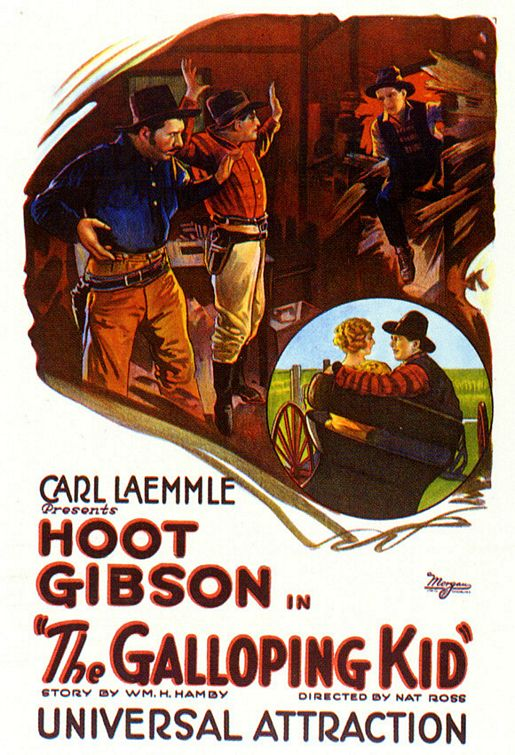
- Film poster
- Directed by: Nat Ross
- Written by: William Henry Hamby; Arthur F. Statter; A. P. Younger
- Starring: Hoot Gibson
- Cinematography: Arthur Reeves
- Distributed by: Universal Film Manufacturing Company
- Release date: September 11, 1922
- Running time: 50 minutes
- Country: United States
- Languages: Silent; English intertitles

The Galloping Kid is a 1922 American silent Western film directed by Nat Ross and featuring Hoot Gibson. It is not known whether the film currently survives.

== Cast ==
- Hoot Gibson as "Simplex" Cox
- Edna Murphy as Helen Arnett
- Lionel Belmore as "FiveasNotch" Arnett
- Léon Bary as Fred Bolston (as Leon Barry)
- Jack Walters as Steve Larabee
- Percy Challenger as Zek Hawkins

== See also ==
- Hoot Gibson filmography
