= Ethel Teare =

American actress

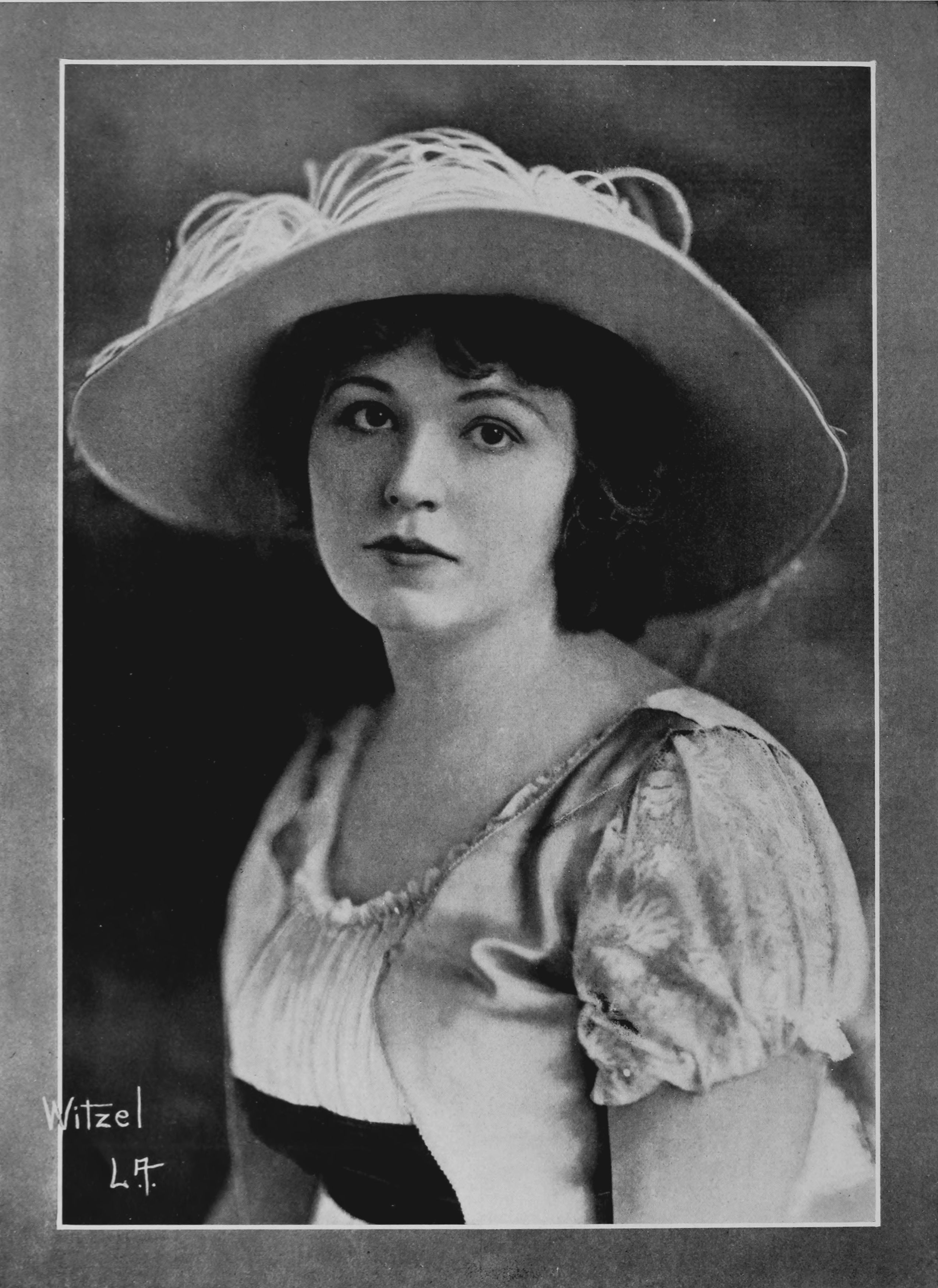
- Teare in 1916
- Born: Ethel O. Risso; January 11, 1894; Phoenix, Arizona, U.S.
- Died: March 4, 1959 (aged 65); Mills Hospital, San Mateo, California, U.S.
- Resting place: Holy Cross Cemetery, Colma, California, U.S.
- Occupation: Actress
- Years active: 1914–1924
- Spouse: Frank F. Risso

Ethel Teare (January 11, 1894 – March 4, 1959) was an American silent film actress from Phoenix, Arizona.

== Screen comedian ==
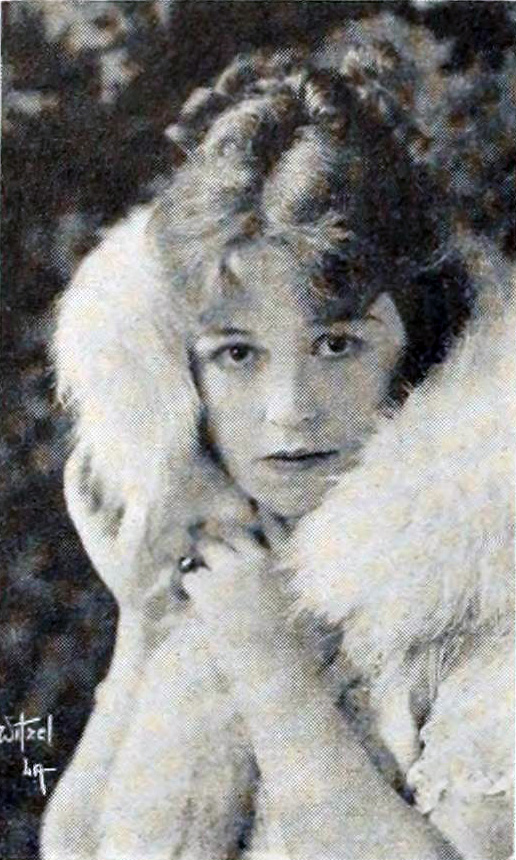
Ethel Teare in 1916

Her first film appearances came in 1914. She performed in The Widow's Might, Fatty and the Shyster Lawyer, Tough Luck Smith, The Devil and Mrs. Walker, In Dutch, Through The Keyhole, and Love, Oil and Grease.

Teare often acted in Mack Sennett comedies during World War I. In Desperate Dud, the Plumber, a Kalem Company produced comedy, Teare starred alongside Charles Dudley in the title role. Some Romance, also produced by Kalem, featured Teare and her mastiff (Kalem company was a forerunner of Universal Pictures in Hollywood).

She also starred in films of her own for Kalem, teaming with Mack Swain in Thirst (1917).

Teare continued in motion pictures until the mid-1920s. One of her final roles was in Antony and Cleopatra (1924), a comedy short directed by Bryan Foy. Other roles of note include Hold Me Tight (1920), Skirts (1921), Please Be Careful (1922), Columbus and Isabella (1924), and A Woman Who Sinned (1924).

== Personal life ==
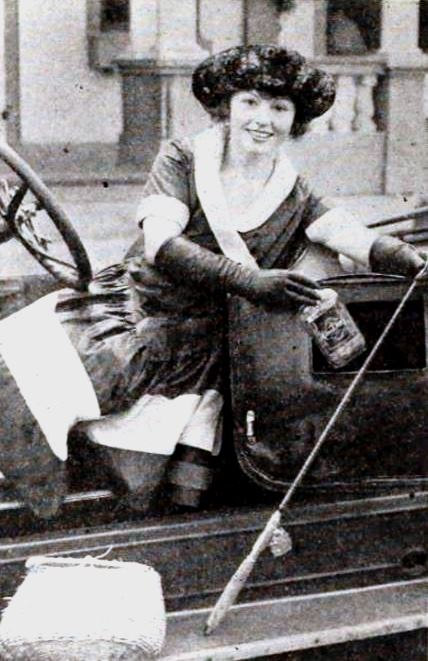
Teare in 1920

Teare married Frank F. Risso, an assistant to the president of Bank of America. She was a member of the Vittoria Colonna Club of San Francisco, California.

== Death ==
On March 4, 1959, Teare died at Mills Hospital in San Mateo, California, following a long illness. She was 65. She had resided in San Mateo since 1925. She was entombed in Holy Cross Cemetery in Colma, California.

== Filmography ==
- The Widow's Might
- Fatty and the Shyster Lawyer
- Tough Luck Smith
- The Devil and Mrs. Walker
- In Dutch
- Through The Keyhole
- Love, Oil and Grease
- Thirst (1917)
- Her First Kiss (1919)

Her First Kiss (1919)

- Her Naughty Wink (1920)
- Hold Me Tight (1920)
- Skirts (1921)
- Please Be Careful (1922)
- Picking Peaches (1924) *short
- Columbus and Isabella (1924)
- A Woman Who Sinned (1924)
- Antony and Cleopatra (1924), a comedy short directed by Bryan Foy
