= Police Call (film) =

1933 film

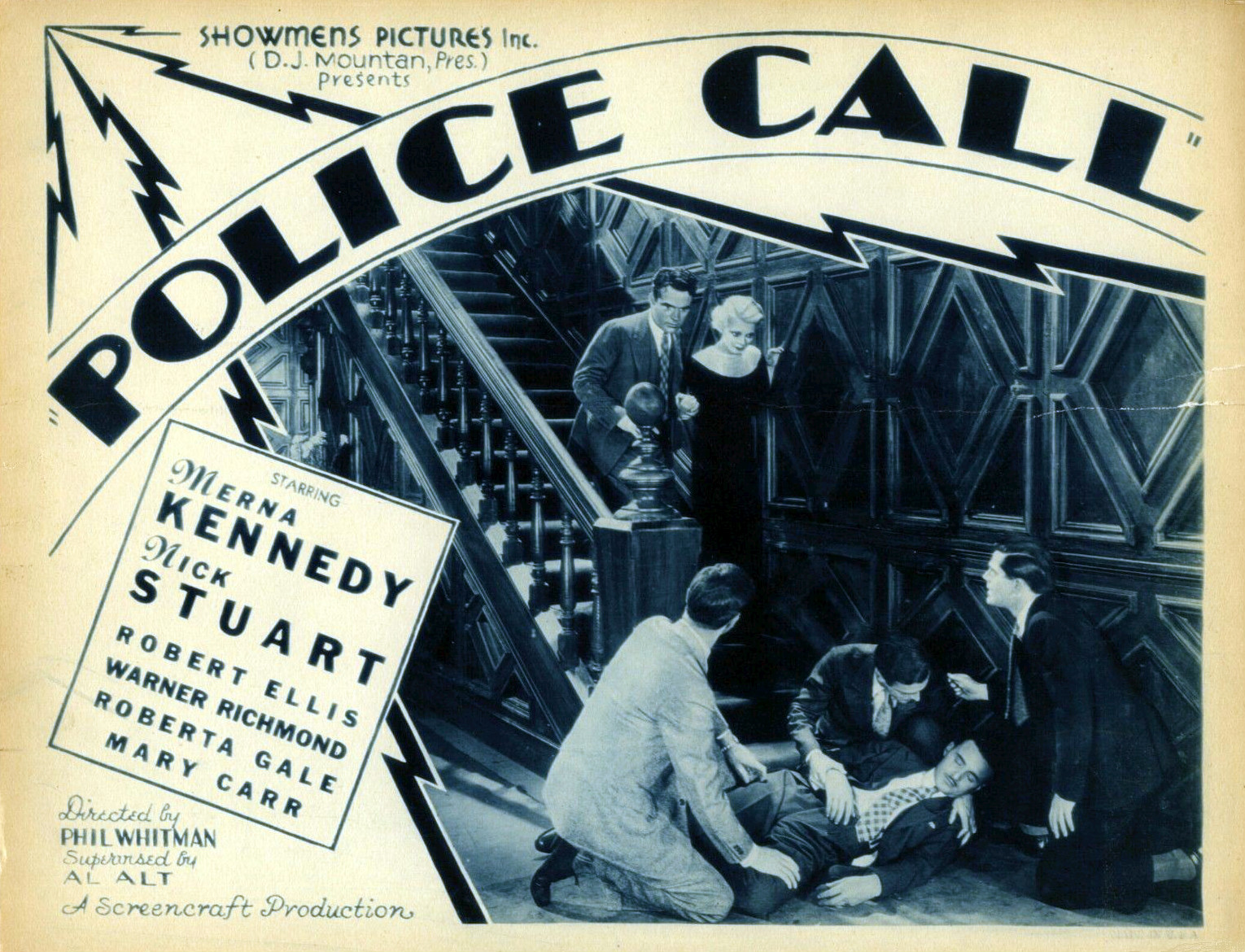
- Lobby card
- Directed by: Phil Whitman
- Screenplay by: Norman Keene; Jean Hartley
- Story by: Norman Keene
- Produced by: Al Alt
- Starring: Nick Stuart; Merna Kennedy
- Cinematography: Abe Scholtz
- Production company: Showmen's Pictures
- Distributed by: States rights
- Release date: July 24, 1933
- Running time: 63 minutes
- Country: United States
- Language: English

Police Call is a 1933 Pre-code American crime drama film directed by Phil Whitman and starring Nick Stuart and Merna Kennedy.

== Cast ==
- Nick Stuart as Dynamite Danny Daniels
- Merna Kennedy as Evelyn Hume
- Roberta Gale as Nora Daniels
- Mary Carr as Mother Daniels
- Walter McGrail as Dr. James A. Gordon
- Warner Richmond as Sammy
- Robert Ellis as Police Chief Crown
- Eddie Phillips as Hymie
- Harry Myers as Steward
- Ralph Freud as Ellsworth
- Charles Stevens as Gang Leader
- Kit Guard as Trainer
