= Reform Girl =

1933 film directed by Sam Newfield

- Directed by: Sam Newfield
- Written by: George Wallace Sayre
- Produced by: Sigmund Neufeld; Morris R. Schlank
- Starring: Noel Francis; Richard 'Skeets' Gallagher; Hale Hamilton
- Cinematography: Harry Forbes
- Edited by: Louis Sackin
- Production company: Tower Productions
- Distributed by: Capitol Film Exchange
- Release date: March 4, 1933
- Running time: 70 minutes
- Country: United States
- Language: English

Reform Girl is a 1933 American crime drama film directed by Sam Newfield and starring Noel Francis, Richard 'Skeets' Gallagher and Hale Hamilton.

== Plot ==
Shortly after being released from reform school, a young woman is recruited as the long lost daughter of a prominent Senator as part of an attempt to discredit him.

== Cast ==
- Noel Francis as Lydia Johnson
- Richard 'Skeets' Gallagher as Joe Burke
- Hale Hamilton as Santor Putnam
- Robert Ellis as Kellar
- Dorothy Peterson as Mrs. Putnam
- Stanley Smith as David Carter
- Ben Hendricks Jr. as Rafferty
- DeWitt Jennings as Capt. Balfour
- Mary Foy as Prison Matron
- Broderick O'Farrell as Putnam Associate
- Alexander Pollard as Putnam's Butler
- Larry Steers as Putnam Associate

== Bibliography ==
- Pitts, Michael R. Poverty Row Studios, 1929–1940: An Illustrated History of 55 Independent Film Companies, with a Filmography for Each. McFarland & Company, 2005.
