= Noel Francis =

American actress (1906–1959)

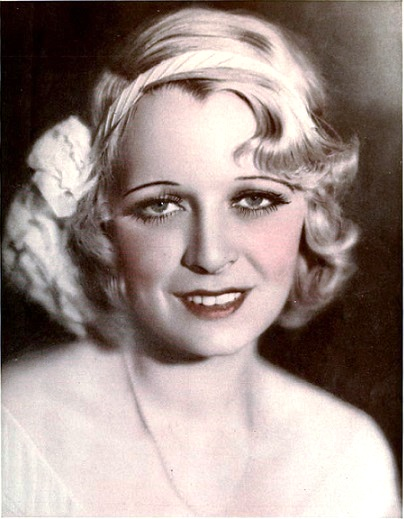
- Francis in 1931
- Born: Noel Frances Sweeney; August 31, 1906; Temple, Texas, U.S.
- Died: October 30, 1959 (aged 53); Los Angeles, California, U.S.
- Occupation: Actress
- Years active: 1925–1937

Noel Francis (born Noel Frances Sweeney; August 31, 1906 – October 30, 1959) was an American actress of the stage and screen during the 1920s and 1930s. Born in Texas, she began her acting career on the Broadway stage in the mid-1920s, before moving to Hollywood at the beginning of the sound film era.

Originally cast in films for her song and dance abilities, when musicals began to fall out of favor, she became better known for her tough girl characters. However, by the mid-1930s, she was being typecast into smaller roles, and made an attempt at a comeback on Broadway. When that failed, she returned briefly to Hollywood to make several B films, before retiring in 1937.

== Early life ==
Francis was born on August 31, 1906, in Temple, Texas, and grew up in Dallas. After high school, Francis attended Southern Methodist University and moved to New York City, where she attended Columbia University.

== Career ==
Her break came when she was 19 years old, when she was cast as a Ziegfeld girl in the Broadway production, Ziegfeld Follies of 1925. For the remainder of the decade she worked constantly for Florenz Ziegfeld, appearing in three more of his productions in featured roles, including a major role in the musical comedy, Rio Rita, which starred the comedy duo of Wheeler and Woolsey. Curiously, when Wheeler and Woolsey reprised their stage roles in a very successful 1929 film of the same name, Francis was not cast in the film, most likely because she was one of the stars in the Broadway production of Show Girl, which also starred Jimmy Durante, Eddie Foy, Jr., and Ruby Keeler.

While appearing in Show Girl, talent scouts from Fox Film saw her song and dance ability and signed her to a contract, intending for her to appear in musicals. Her debut film was in a featured role in the Fox's big budget musical of the year, New Movietone Follies of 1930. Her performance garnered good reviews by The New York Times, even though the film did not do well at the box office, due to flagging audience interest in these types of musical reviews. She had featured roles in two more films that year, including the John Ford comedy Up the River.

Due to the lack of success of Fox Movietone Follies of 1930, Fox dropped Francis' contract, but she quickly switched studios to Warner Bros., where she had her biggest film successes playing tough no-nonsense women. During this period in the early 1930s she had significant roles in several notable films. She had featured roles in two films with James Cagney in 1931, Smart Money and Blonde Crazy. In 1932, she had supporting and featured roles in numerous films, including what some said was her best role, as Linda in I Am a Fugitive from a Chain Gang, which starred Paul Muni. Both the film and Muni were nominated for an Academy Award.

However, after Fugitive, the roles offered to Francis began to be smaller, and in smaller films, although she continued to be quite active through the mid-1930s. In early 1935, she had one of her few starring roles, in Stone of Silver Creek, which also starred Buck Jones, with whom she developed a friendship. Not satisfied with the caliber of work she was getting, Francis attempted to resurrect her Broadway career, returning to New York, where she starred in Satellite, which lasted a single performance in November 1935. After her failure to re-launch her stage career, she returned to Hollywood, where she starred in two more westerns with Jones in 1937, before retiring.

== Death ==
Francis died in Los Angeles on October 30, 1959, at age 53.

== Filmography ==
(Per AFI database)

- New Movietone Follies of 1930 (1930) as Gloria de Witt
- Rough Romance (1930) as Flossie
- Up the River (1930) as Sophie (uncredited)
- Smart Money (1931) as Marie
- Bachelor Apartment (1931) as Janet
- Blonde Crazy (1931) as Helen Wilson
- Ladies of the Big House (1931) as Thelma
- Smart Woman (1931) as Miss Peggy Preston
- Resurrection (1931) as Party Girl (uncredited)
- So Big (1932) as Mabel, a 'Fancy Woman'
- Night Court (1932) as Lil Baker
- I Am a Fugitive from a Chain Gang (1932) as Linda
- Flames (1932) as Pat
- Guilty as Hell (1932) as Julia Reed
- My Pal, the King (1932) as Princess Elsa
- Manhattan Tower (1932) as Marge Lyon
- The Expert (1932) as Daisy
- The Mouthpiece (1932) as Miss DeVere
- Madison Square Garden (1932) as Noel
- Under-Cover Man (1932) as Connie
- Man About Town (1932) as Hazel (uncredited)
- Frisco Jenny (1932) as Rosie (uncredited)
- Bureau of Missing Persons (1933) as Alice Crane
- Blood Money (1933) as Red's Girlfriend (uncredited)
- The Important Witness (1933) as Ellen Kelly
- Reform Girl (1933) as Lydia Johnson
- Son of a Sailor (1933) as Queenie
- Her Resale Value (1933) as Milly
- Hold Me Tight (1933) as Trudie (uncredited)
- Only Yesterday (1933) as Letitia
- The Important Witness (1933) as Ellen Kelly
- What's Your Racket? (1934) as Mae Cosgrove
- Imitation of Life (1934) as Mrs. Eden (uncredited)
- The Man Who Reclaimed His Head (1934) as Chon-Chon - Blonde in Theatre Box (uncredited)
- Fifteen Wives (1934) as Ruby Cotton
- The Loudspeaker (1934) as Dolly
- Good Dame (1934) as Puff Warner
- The White Parade (1934) as Nurse Clare
- The Line-Up (1934) as Mabel Martin
- The White Cockatoo (1935) as Elise
- Mutiny Ahead (1935) as Mimi
- Stone of Silver Creek (1935) as Lola
- Sudden Bill Dorn (1937) as Lorna Kent
- Left-Handed Law (1937) as Betty Golden
