= The Marriage Chance =

1922 film

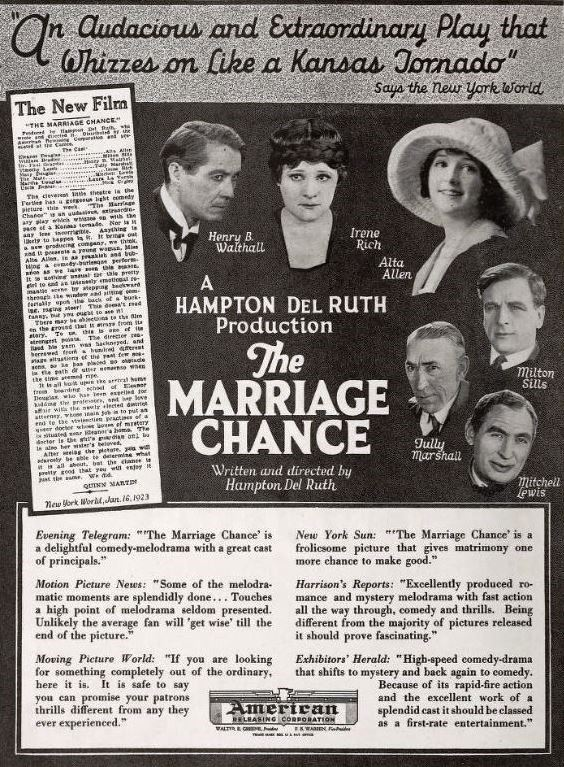
- Directed by: Hampton Del Ruth
- Written by: Hampton Del Ruth
- Produced by: Hampton Del Ruth
- Starring: Alta Allen; Milton Sills; Irene Rich
- Cinematography: Dal Clawson
- Production company: Hampton Del Ruth Productions
- Distributed by: American Releasing Corporation
- Release date: December 10, 1922
- Running time: 60 minutes
- Country: United States
- Languages: Silent; English intertitles

The Marriage Chance is a 1922 American silent comedy film directed by Hampton Del Ruth and starring Alta Allen, Milton Sills and Irene Rich.

== Cast ==
- Alta Allen as Eleannor Douglas
- Milton Sills as William Bradley
- Henry B. Walthall as Dr. Paul Graydon
- Tully Marshall as Timothy Lamb
- Irene Rich as Mary Douglas
- Mitchell Lewis as The Mute
- Laura La Varnie as Martha Douglas
- Nick Cogley as Uncle Remus

== Bibliography ==
- Connelly, Robert B. The Silents: Silent Feature Films, 1910-36, Volume 40, Issue 2. December Press, 1998.
- Munden, Kenneth White. The American Film Institute Catalog of Motion Pictures Produced in the United States, Part 1. University of California Press, 1997.
