= Nat Ross =

American film director

- Born: June 13, 1902; San Francisco, California
- Died: February 24, 1941 (aged 38); Los Angeles
- Occupation: Film director
- Years active: 1922 – 1931

Nat Ross (June 13, 1902 – February 24, 1941) was an American film director and producer of the silent era. He directed more than 60 films between 1922 and 1931, and produced films until 1937. He was born in San Francisco, California. He was shot dead in Los Angeles in 1941 by a disgruntled employee whom Ross had fired from the plant where Ross was working as foreman. He was the nephew of producer Carl Laemmle.

== Partial filmography ==
- Ridin' Wild (1922)
- The Galloping Kid (1922)
- The Ghost Patrol (1923)
- Pure Grit (1923)
- The Six-Fifty (1923)
- The Slanderers (1924)
- Striving for Fortune (1926)
- April Fool (1926)
- Two Can Play (1926)
- Transcontinental Limited (1926)
- Stop That Man! (1928)
- College Love (1929)
- The Man from Guntown (1935)
- Darby and Joan (1937)
