= Temptations of a Shop Girl =

1927 film by Tom Terriss

- Directed by: Tom Terriss
- Written by: L. V. Jefferson (story, scenario); Jean Le'Ple (titles)
- Produced by: I. E. Chadwick
- Starring: Betty Compson; Pauline Garon
- Cinematography: George Benoit; Ted Tetzlaff
- Production company: Chadwick Pictures
- Distributed by: First Division Pictures Inc.
- Release date: November 1, 1927
- Running time: 6 reels
- Country: USA
- Language: Silent with English intertitles

Temptations of a Shop Girl is a 1927 American silent crime drama film directed by Tom Terriss, with Betty Compson and Pauline Garon leading the cast. B-movie studio Chadwick Pictures was the production company.

== Cast ==
- Betty Compson – Ruth Harrington
- Pauline Garon – Betty Harrington
- Armand Kaliz – Andre Le Croix
- Bob Custer – Jerry Horton (*as Raymond Glenn)
- William Humphrey – John Horton (*as William Humphreys)
- Cora Williams – Mrs. Harrington
- Gladden James – Bud Conway
- John Francis Dillon – Jim Butler

== Preservation ==
Temptations of a Shopgirl is currently presumed lost. In February of 2021, the film was cited by the National Film Preservation Board on their Lost U.S. Silent Feature Films list.
