= Mutiny Ahead =

1935 American adventure film

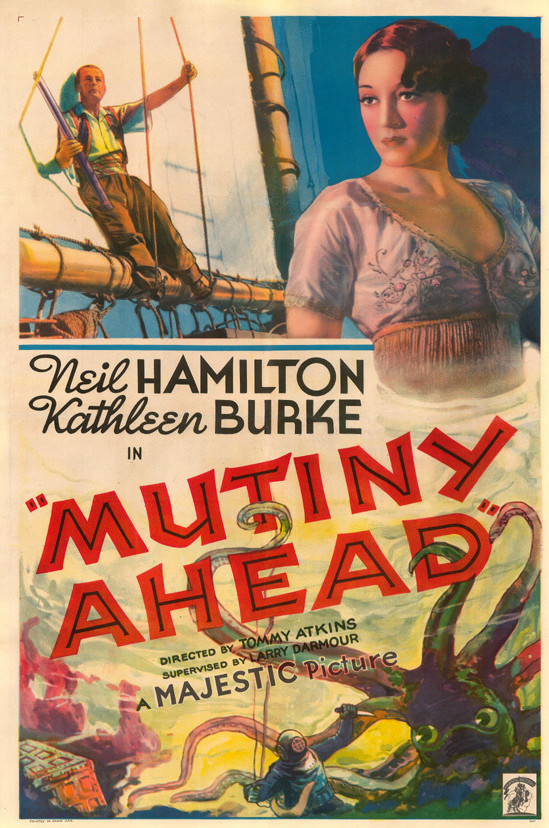
- Directed by: Thomas Atkins
- Written by: Stuart Anthony
- Produced by: Larry Darmour
- Starring: Neil Hamilton; Kathleen Burke; Leon Ames
- Cinematography: rkpatrick
- Edited by: Dwight Caldwell
- Music by: Lee Zahler
- Production company: Larry Darmour Productions
- Distributed by: Majestic Pictures
- Release date: March 1, 1935
- Running time: 71 minutes
- Country: United States
- Language: English

Mutiny Ahead is a 1935 American adventure film directed by Thomas Atkins and starring Neil Hamilton, Kathleen Burke and Leon Ames.

== Plot ==
A playboy named Kent Brewster, who is in debt, gets caught up with jewel thieves. Though he initially refuses their offer to steal a pearl necklace from a socialite, they force him to do it. He manages to steal the pearls at a costume ball but loses them to sailors after being attacked.

Kent tracks the sailors to a ship called the "Star of India," where he stows away. To his surprise, he discovers the ship is owned by the family of Carol Bixby, the heiress he met and kissed at the ball. Knowing the police are looking for him, Carol makes him work in the galley as punishment.

During the voyage, they recover sunken treasure from a shipwreck, but the ship's first mate, McMurtrie, and a group of disgruntled sailors plot a mutiny to steal the gold. Kent intervenes, single-handedly preventing the mutiny and saving the ship. Having been reformed by his ordeal and proving his courage, Kent professes his love for Carol, and the two set sail for home.

== Cast ==
- Neil Hamilton Kent Brewster
- Kathleen Burke as Carol Bixby
- Leon Ames as McMurtrie
- Reginald Barlow as Captain Martin
- Noel Francis as Mimi
- Paul Fix as Teeter Smith
- Dick Curtis as Stevens
- Ray Turner as Sassafras
- Katherine Jackson as Glory Bell
- Maidel Turner as Kitty Vanderpool
- Roger Moore as Darby
- Edward Earle as Barnes
- Boothe Howard as Dudley - Casino Proprietor
- Matthew Betz as Dixon

== Bibliography ==
- Pitts, Michael R. Poverty Row Studios, 1929–1940: An Illustrated History of 55 Independent Film Companies, with a Filmography for Each. McFarland & Company, 2005.
