= Stop That Man! =

1928 film

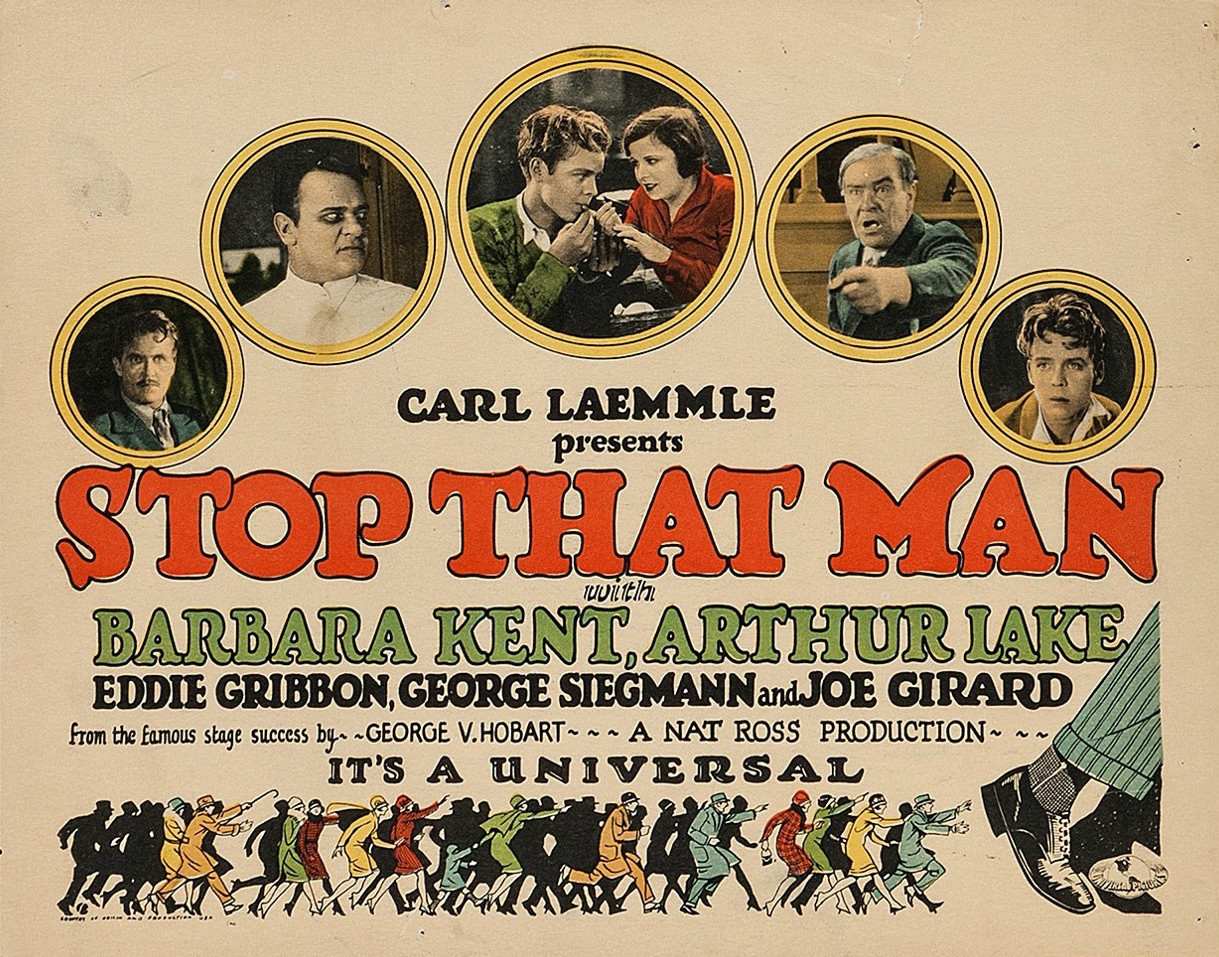
- Directed by: Nat Ross
- Written by: George V. Hobart (play); Harry O. Hoyt; Joseph F. Poland; Tom Reed; Richard Smith
- Starring: Arthur Lake; Barbara Kent; Eddie Gribbon
- Cinematography: George Robinson
- Edited by: Robert Jahns
- Production company: Universal Pictures
- Distributed by: Universal Pictures
- Release date: March 11, 1928
- Running time: 60 minutes
- Country: United States
- Languages: Silent; English intertitles

Stop That Man! is a 1928 American silent comedy film directed by Nat Ross and starring Arthur Lake, Barbara Kent and Eddie Gribbon. The screenplay concerns a man who accidentally assists a group of criminals.

== Plot summary ==
The young brother of two police officers borrows one of their uniforms. While masquerading as a cop, he accidentally assists a group of criminals committing a burglary. Fortunately he is able to capture the culprits and deliver them to the real police.

== Cast ==
- Arthur Lake as Tommy O'Brien
- Barbara Kent as Muriel Crawford
- Eddie Gribbon as Bill O'Brien
- Warner Richmond as Jim O'Brien
- Walter McGrail as 'Slippery Dick' Sylvaine
- George Siegmann as 'Butch' Barker
- Joseph W. Girard as Captain Ryan

== Bibliography ==
- Langman, Larry. American Film Cycles: The Silent Era. Greenwood Publishing Group, 1998.
