= The Adventures of Robinson Crusoe (serial) =

1922 film

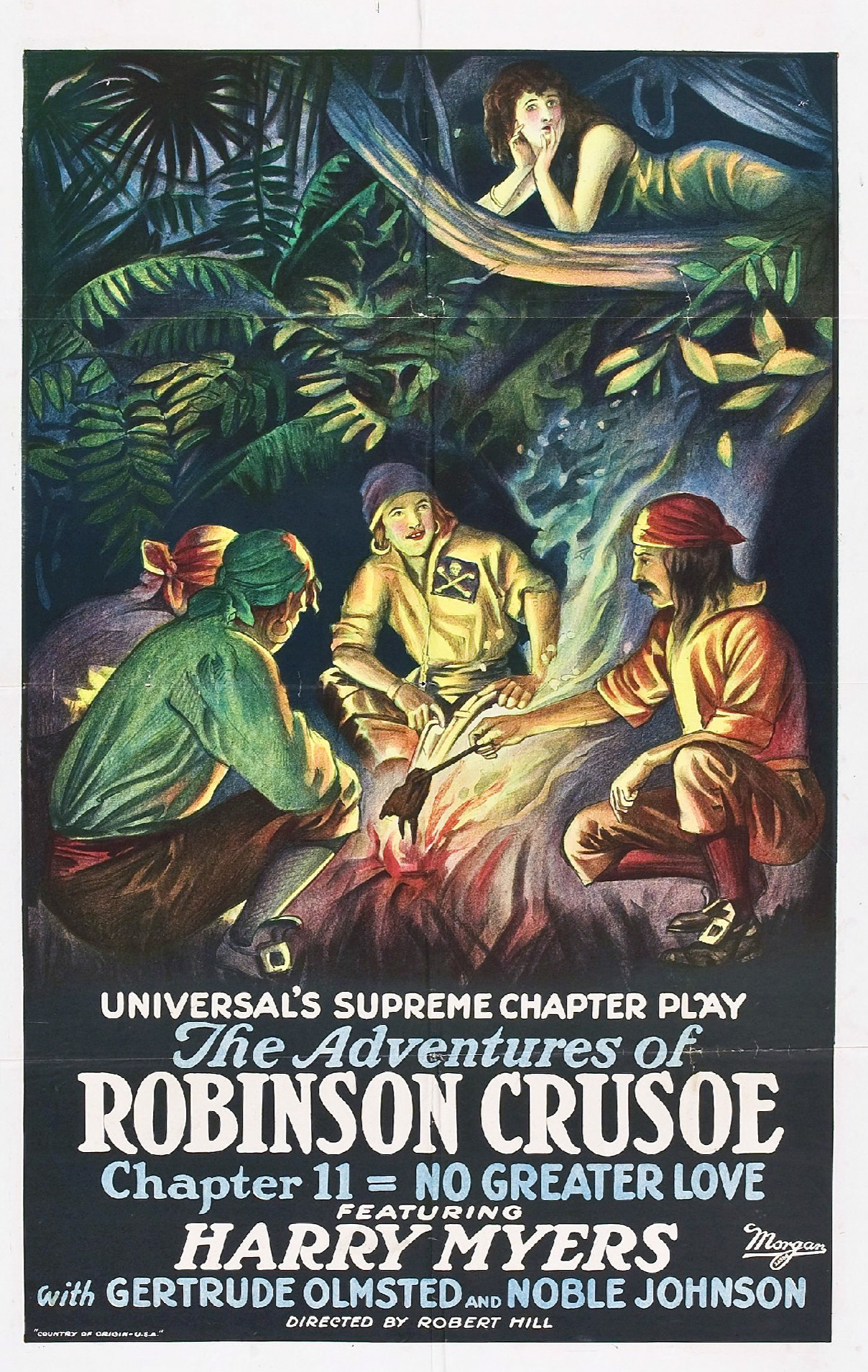
- Film poster
- Directed by: Robert F. Hill
- Written by: Emma Bell Clifton
- Based on: Robinson Crusoe by Daniel Defoe
- Starring: Harry Myers; Noble Johnson
- Distributed by: Universal Film Manufacturing Co.
- Release date: March 22, 1922
- Running time: 18 episodes
- Country: United States
- Language: Silent (English intertitles)

The Adventures of Robinson Crusoe is a 1922 American adventure film serial directed by Robert F. Hill and based upon the 1719 novel by Daniel Defoe. It is now considered to be a lost film.

== Cast ==
- Harry Myers as Robinson Crusoe
- Noble Johnson as Friday
- Gertrude Olmstead
- Aaron Edwards
- Josef Swickard
- Gertrude Claire
- Emmett King
- Scott Pembroke (credited as Percy Pembroke)

== Chapter titles ==
1. The Sea Raiders
2. Shipwrecked
3. The Cannibals' Captives
4. Hidden Gold
5. The Ship of Despair
6. Friday's Faith
7. The Swamp of Terror
8. Marooned
9. The Jaguar Trap
10. A Prisoner of the Sun
11. No Greater Love
12. The Island of Happiness
13. The Sword of Courage
14. The Buccaneers
15. The Jolly Roger
16. The Idol's Bride
17. When the Heart Calls
18. Back to the Primitive

== See also ==
- List of film serials
- List of film serials by studio
