= Chadwick Pictures =

American distribution and film production company

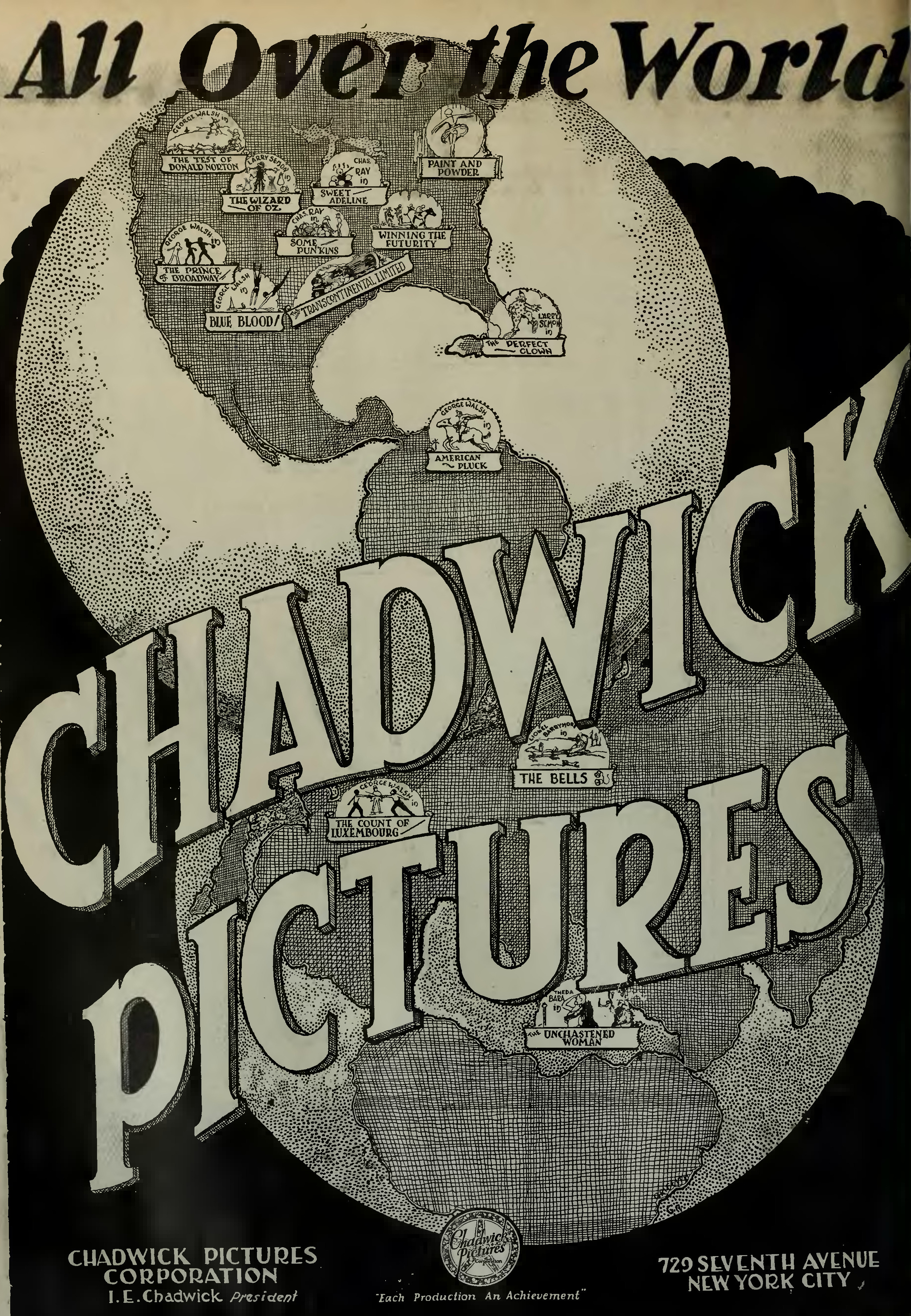
Chadwick Pictures ad in The Film Daily, 1926

Chadwick Pictures was an American film production and distribution company active during the silent and early sound eras. It was originally established in New York by Isaac E. Chadwick (1884 – 1952) in 1920 to release films, but from 1924 also began to produce them. In later years the company's independent films were similar to those of other small studios on Poverty Row. Following the introduction of sound, its releases were handled by Monogram Pictures. In 1933 it ceased production entirely.

== Filmography ==
- The Fire Patrol (1924)
- The Girl in the Limousine (1924) lost film
- I Am the Man (1924) lost film
- The Painted Flapper (1924) lost film
- Meddling Women (1924)
- The Tomboy (1924)
- Flattery (1925) lost film
- A Man of Iron (1925) lost film
- Some Pun'kins (1925) lost film
- The Perfect Clown (1925)
- American Pluck (1925)
- The Midnight Girl (1925)
- Paint and Powder (1925)
- The Unchastened Woman (1925)
- Blue Blood (1925)
- The Wizard of Oz (1925)
- The Test of Donald Norton (1926)
- Devil's Island (1926)
- The Bells (1926)
- Sweet Adeline (1926)
- Transcontinental Limited (1926)
- April Fool (1926)
- Winning the Futurity (1926)
- The Power of the Weak (1926) lost film
- The Prince of Broadway (1926)
- Sunshine of Paradise Alley (1926)
- The Count of Luxembourg (1926) lost film
- Temptations of a Shop Girl (1927) lost film
- Eager Lips (1927) one reel missing
- Is Your Daughter Safe? (1927) lost film
- Driven from Home (1927)
- Ladies at Ease (1927)
- Naughty (1927)
- The Shamrock and the Rose (1927)
- The Return of Boston Blackie (1927)
- Say It with Diamonds (1927)
- Life of an Actress (1927)
- The Ladybird (1927)
- Life's Mockery (1928)
- The Masked Angel (1928) lost film
- The Devil's Cage (1928)
- The Law of the Sea (1931)
- Police Court (1932)
- Flames (1932)
- The Girl from Calgary (1932)
- A Strange Adventure (1932)
- The Return of Casey Jones (1933)
- Oliver Twist (1933)
- Jungle Bride (1933)
- Black Beauty (1933)
- Wine, Women and Song (1933)

== Bibliography ==
- Mark Evan Swartz. Oz Before the Rainbow: L. Frank Baum's the Wonderful Wizard of Oz on Stage and Screen to 1939. JHU Press, 2002. ISBN 0-8018-6477-1
