= Transcontinental Limited =

1926 film directed by Nat Ross

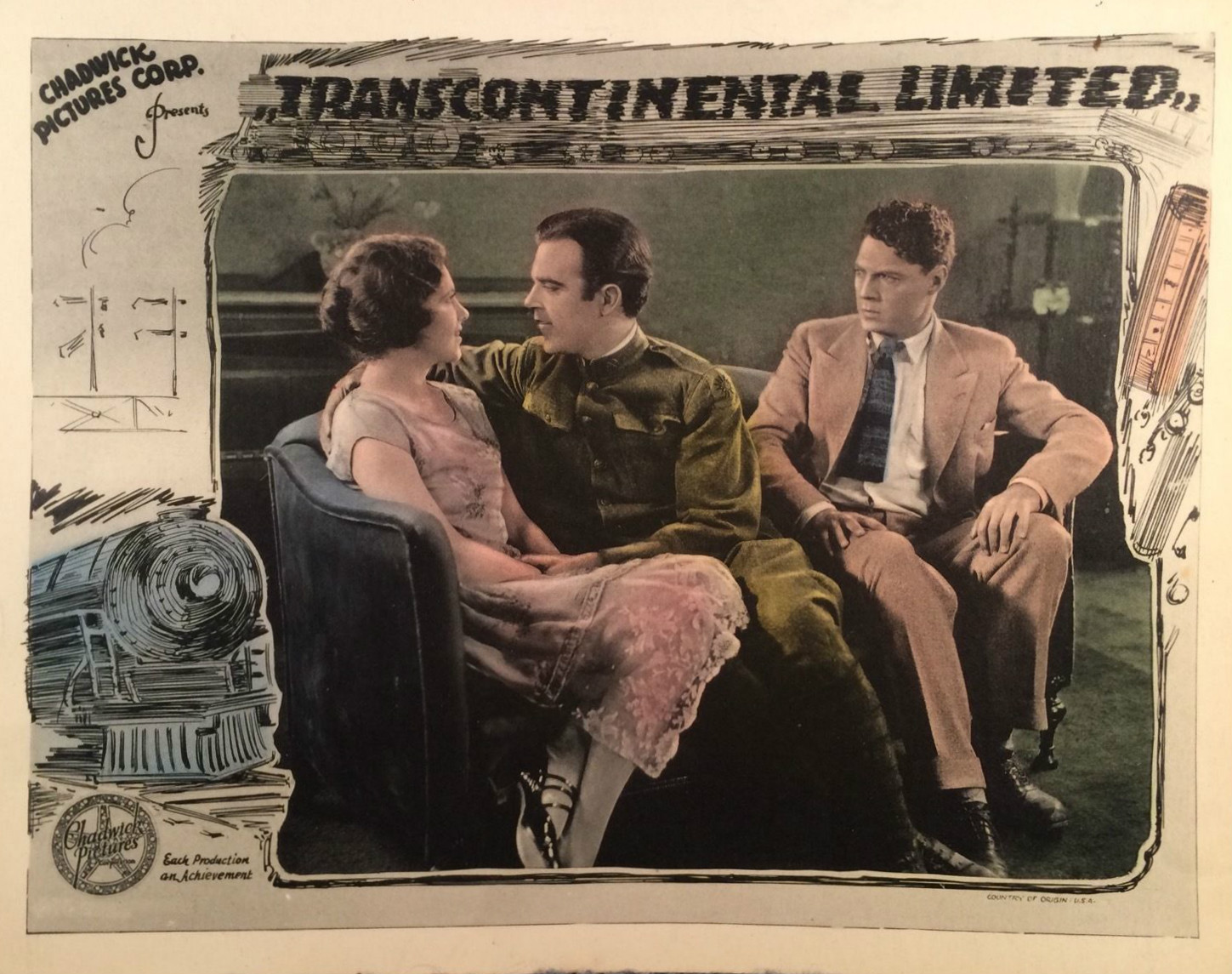
- Directed by: Nat Ross
- Written by: Hampton Del Ruth
- Produced by: I.E. Chadwick
- Starring: Johnnie Walker; Eugenia Gilbert; Alec B. Francis
- Cinematography: W. Steve Smith Jr.
- Production company: Chadwick Pictures
- Distributed by: Chadwick Pictures
- Release date: February 4, 1926
- Running time: 70 minutes
- Country: United States
- Languages: Silent; English intertitles

Transcontinental Limited is a 1926 American silent drama film directed by Nat Ross and starring Johnnie Walker, Eugenia Gilbert, and Alec B. Francis. A print of Transcontinental Limited exists.

== Plot ==
As described in a film magazine review, Johnnie Lane, back from the war, finds Joe Slavin pestering his sweetheart Mary Reynolds in an effort to get her to marry him. Slavin, a fireman for Mary's father Jerry Reynolds on the Transcontinental Limited train, knows that the engineer's eyesight has become poor and consequently has a hold on him. The family needs money for an operation for Mary's mother. Slim and Pudge, two of Johnnie's buddies, get the needed sum from Slavin, who has stolen it from the train station safe, and later the money is returned. Johnnie thrashes Slavin, saves the Limited from being wrecked, and finally wins the affection of Mary.

== Cast ==
- Johnnie Walker as Johnnie Lane
- Eugenia Gilbert as Mary Reynolds
- Alec B. Francis as Jerry Reynolds
- Edith Murgatroyd as Sara Reynolds
- Bruce Gordon as Joe Slavin
- Edward Gillace as Slim
- George Ovey as Pudge
- Eric Mayne as Dr. Voija Pourtalis
- James Hamel as Bob Harrison

== Bibliography ==
- Munden, Kenneth White. The American Film Institute Catalog of Motion Pictures Produced in the United States, Part 1. University of California Press, 1997.
