= Naughty (1927 film) =

1927 film

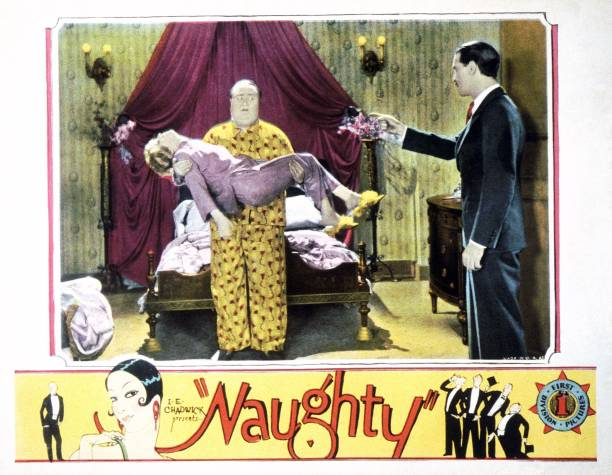
- Directed by: Hampton Del Ruth
- Written by: Hampton Del Ruth; Jean La'Ple (intertitles)
- Produced by: Chadwick Pictures
- Starring: Pauline Garon
- Cinematography: Ernest Miller
- Distributed by: First Division Distributors
- Release date: August 15, 1927
- Running time: 6 reels
- Country: United States
- Language: Silent..English titles

Naughty is a 1927 American silent comedy film directed by Hampton Del Ruth and starring Pauline Garon and John Harron. It was produced by Chadwick Pictures.

It is preserved in the Library of Congress collection and the Cinematheque Royale de Belgique, Brussels.

== Cast ==
- Pauline Garon - The Bride
- John Harron - The Groom
- Walter Hiers - The Best Friend
