= The Set-Up (1926 film) =

1926 film

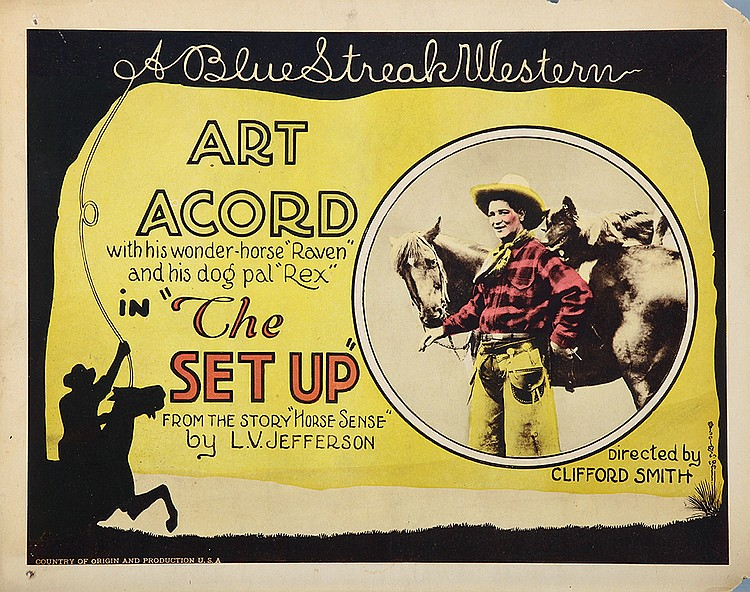
- Lobby card
- Directed by: Clifford Smith
- Written by: Harrison Jacobs
- Based on: Horse Sense by L. V. Jefferson
- Produced by: Carl Laemmle
- Starring: Art Acord; Alta Allen; Albert Schaefer
- Cinematography: Edward Linden
- Production company: Universal Pictures
- Distributed by: Universal Pictures
- Release date: February 15, 1926
- Running time: 55 minutes
- Country: United States
- Language: Silent (English intertitles)

The Set-Up is a 1926 American silent Western film directed by Clifford Smith and starring Art Acord, Alta Allen, and Albert Schaefer.

== Plot ==
As described in a film magazine review, Thora Barton's father is killed by robbers who fail to find the bag of money he was carrying. Stratton, deputy sheriff who is in love with Thora, is set to guard the Barton ranch for latter's creditors. The bag is found by two youngsters who rush to tell Thera. Thora goes with them to get the money and is followed by thugs, but rescued by Stratton, who tricks one of the criminals into confessing to the Cliff Barton murder.

== Cast ==
- Art Acord as Deputy Art Stratton
- Alta Allen as Thora Barton
- Albert Schaefer as Tub Jones
- Thomas G. Lingham as Seth Tolliver
- C. Montague Shaw as Cliff Barton
- Jack Quinn as Bert Tolliver
- William Welsh as Sheriff Hayes

== Bibliography ==
- Munden, Kenneth White. The American Film Institute Catalog of Motion Pictures Produced in the United States, Part 1. University of California Press, 1997.
