= Seven Years Bad Luck =

1921 film by Max Linder

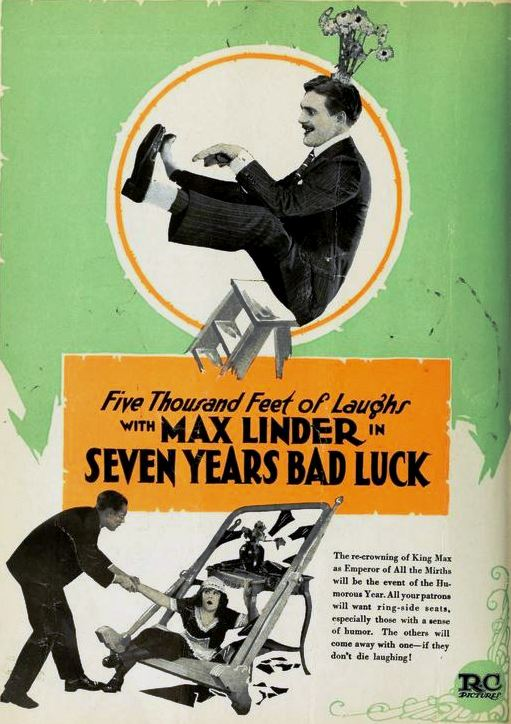
- Directed by: Max Linder
- Written by: Max Linder
- Produced by: Max Linder
- Starring: Max Linder
- Cinematography: Charles Van Enger
- Distributed by: Robertson-Cole Distributing Corporation
- Release date: February 6, 1921
- Running time: 65 minutes
- Country: United States
- Languages: Silent; English (original intertitles)

Seven Years Bad Luck is a 1921 American silent comedy film written and directed by, and starring Max Linder. A man about to be married becomes fearful of bad luck when he breaks a mirror.

== Plot ==
Seven Years Bad Luck (full film)

Max Linder returns home drunk after his bachelor party. The next morning, he is awakened by a loud noise. His valet John, while chasing his pretty maid, has broken his mirror. John claims Mary, the maid, dropped a napkin. By the time Max drags himself out of bed, Mary has cleared away the broken glass and John has gotten Max's chef to dress just like their employer. Then, when Max looks into the non-existent glass, the chef mimics his every action. Max finally realizes he is being tricked, but while he is in the other room, John sneaks in a repairman to fix the mirror. Thus when Max flings something at what he thinks is an imposter, he breaks the mirror himself, much to his surprise. Now he fears he has brought seven years bad luck on himself (a well-known superstition).

He goes to see Betty, his fiancée. While waiting, he has her maid (a psychic) read his palm. She warns him that she sees danger in the form of a dog, so he takes Betty's small pet and sticks it in a vase. When Betty sees what he has done, she breaks up with him.

She reconsiders and asks him to come back, but when he does, he has to wait for her once again. He first puts on a record, then dances with her maid, and finally starts wildly playing the piano. His nonchalant behavior infuriates Betty, and she sends him packing again.

Max asks his friend to go see Betty to try to patch things up, but his friend wants Betty for himself. He lies to her, telling her Max has decided to marry one of his old girlfriends. When Betty seeks some way to obtain revenge, the friend suggests she marry him. She assents.

His hopes dashed, Max decides to take a train trip. He is robbed at the station, so he sneaks aboard. The conductor spots him, though, and a chase ensues. Max gets off at the next station. The station agent has taken an unauthorized break, leaving his daughter in charge. Max disguises himself as the agent, inadvertently saving the man's job when the conductor asks for him. After more hijinks, he manages to reboard the train, leaving the pesky conductor behind. The conductor, however, wires ahead, and Max is arrested at the next stop. He gets away at first, jumping on an elephant and loitering in a cage full of lions, but is eventually jailed.

By chance, when he is brought before the judge, he sees Betty and his false friend there to get married. He and Betty reconcile.

== Cast ==
- Max Linder as Max Linder
- Alta Allen as Betty, Max's fiancée
- Ralph McCullough as John, Max's Valet
- Betty Peterson as Mary, Max's Maid
- F. B. Crayne as Max's False Friend
- Chance Ward as The Railroad Conductor
- Hugh Saxon as Station Agent (as High Saxon)
- Thelma Percy as Station Agent's Daughter
- C. E. Anderson as A Jail Bird
- Lola Gonzales as Betty's Hawaiian Maid (uncredited)
- Harry Mann as Max's Chef (uncredited)
- Joe Martin as the orangutan
