= Life's Mockery =

1928 film

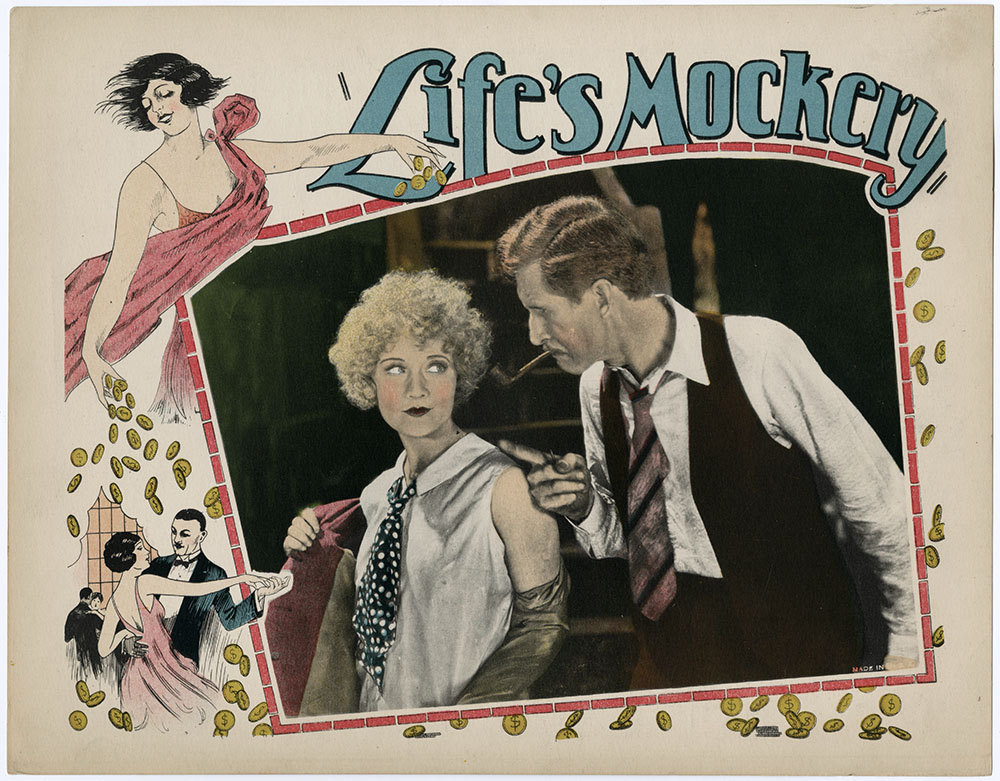
- Directed by: Robert F. Hill
- Written by: Isadore Bernstein (story, scenario); Leon Lee (titles)
- Produced by: Chadwick Pictures Corporation
- Starring: Betty Compson
- Cinematography: Ted Tetzlff
- Edited by: Gene Milford
- Distributed by: Chadwick Pictures
- Release date: July 20, 1928
- Running time: 7 reels
- Country: United States
- Language: Silent (English intertitles)

Life's Mockery is a 1928 American silent drama film directed by Robert F. Hill and starring Betty Compson. It was produced by independent studio Chadwick Pictures who also distributed.

== Cast ==
- Betty Compson as Kit Miller/Isabelle Fullerton
- Alec B. Francis as John Fullerton
- Russell Simpson as Wolf Miller
- Theodore von Eltz as Wade Fullerton
- Dorothy Cumming as Gladys Morrison

== Preservation ==
A complete 35mm print of Life's Mockery is held by the Archives du Film du CNC in Bois d'Arcy.
