= Flames (1932 film) =

1932 film

- Directed by: Karl Brown
- Written by: Karl Brown
- Produced by: I.E. Chadwick; Trem Carr
- Starring: Johnny Mack Brown; George Cooper; Noel Francis
- Cinematography: Archie Stout
- Edited by: Carl Pierson
- Production company: Chadwick Pictures
- Distributed by: Monogram Pictures
- Release date: May 30, 1932
- Running time: 63 minutes
- Country: United States
- Language: English

Flames is a 1932 American pre-Code drama film written and directed by Karl Brown and starring Johnny Mack Brown, George Cooper and Noel Francis.

== Plot ==
Two young firefighters and the girlfriends they meet after rescuing their stranded cat go on adventures.

== Cast ==
- Johnny Mack Brown as Charlie
- George Cooper as Fishey
- Noel Francis as Pat
- Marjorie Beebe as Gertie
- Richard Tucker as Garson
- Russell Simpson as Jake
- Patricia Caron as Miss La Rue
- Kit Guard as Pete
- Fred Parker as Henderson
- Fred 'Snowflake' Toones as Janitor

== Bibliography ==
- Don Miller. "B" Movies: An Informal Survey of the American Low-budget Film, 1933-1945. Curtis Books, 1973.
