= Pure Grit =

1923 film

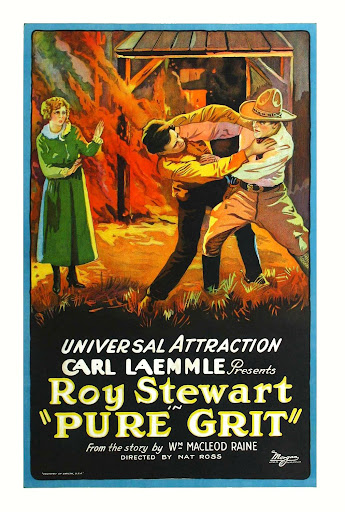
- Theatrical poster
- Directed by: Nat Ross
- Written by: Isadore Bernstein
- Based on: A Texas Ranger by William MacLeod Raine
- Produced by: Carl Laemmle
- Starring: Roy Stewart; Esther Ralston; Jack Mower
- Cinematography: Benjamin H. Kline
- Production company: Universal Pictures
- Distributed by: Universal Pictures
- Release date: December 31, 1923
- Running time: 50 minutes
- Country: United States
- Language: Silent (English intertitles)

Pure Grit is a 1923 American silent Western film directed by Nat Ross and starring Roy Stewart, Esther Ralston, and Jack Mower. It is based on the 1911 novel A Texas Ranger by William MacLeod Raine.

== Plot ==
As described in a film magazine review, Bob Evans, a Texas Ranger, falls in love with school teacher Stella Bolling. She aids Jim Kemp, a wounded stranger, who reveals himself to be her long-lost brother, who had broken out of jail. Buddy Clark, an orphan also cared for by Stella, rescues another wounded man, and learns from him that he is really Stella's brother, and that Stella is being imposed on by the other stranger. Stella has gone with the stranger. Bob pursues them and saves Stella from an attack by the stranger at a burning cabin, who meets his just deserts. Buddy also saves a dog from the burning cabin. Bob has won Stella's affection.

== Cast ==
- Roy Stewart as Bob Evans
- Esther Ralston as Stella Bolling
- Jere Austin as Jim Kemp
- Jack Mower as Frank Bolling
- Verne Winter as Buddy Clark
- Wesley Barry as Newsboy (uncredited)

== Preservation ==
The film is currently lost.

== Bibliography ==
- Connelly, Robert B. The Silents: Silent Feature Films, 1910-36, Volume 40, Issue 2. December Press, 1998.
- Munden, Kenneth White. The American Film Institute Catalog of Motion Pictures Produced in the United States, Part 1. University of California Press, 1997.
