= Air Eagles =

1931 film

- Directed by: Phil Whitman
- Written by: Hampton Del Ruth; E.V. Durling; Lewis R. Foster; Walter Q. MacDonald
- Produced by: Larry Darmour; W. Ray Johnston
- Starring: Lloyd Hughes; Norman Kerry; Shirley Grey
- Cinematography: James S. Brown Jr.
- Edited by: Dwight Caldwell
- Music by: Lee Zahler
- Production company: Larry Darmour Productions
- Distributed by: Continental Talking Pictures
- Release date: December 20, 1931
- Running time: 72 minutes
- Country: United States
- Language: English

Air Eagles is a 1931 American pre-Code action film directed by Phil Whitman and starring Lloyd Hughes, Norman Kerry, and Shirley Grey.

== Cast ==
- Lloyd Hughes as Bill Ramsey
- Norman Kerry as Otto Schumann
- Shirley Grey as Eve
- Berton Churchill as Windy J. Bailey
- Matty Kemp as Eddie Ramsey
- Otis Harlan as Mr. Ramsey
- Kathrin Clare Ward as Mrs. Ramsey
- Eddie Fetherston as Pickpocket
- Olin Francis as Guard
- John Ince as Doctor
- Lew Meehan as Guard
- George Morrell as Onlooker

== Bibliography ==
- Michael R. Pitts. Poverty Row Studios, 1929–1940: An Illustrated History of 55 Independent Film Companies, with a Filmography for Each. McFarland & Company, 2005.
