= Hampton Del Ruth =

Actor, director, screenwriter, producer

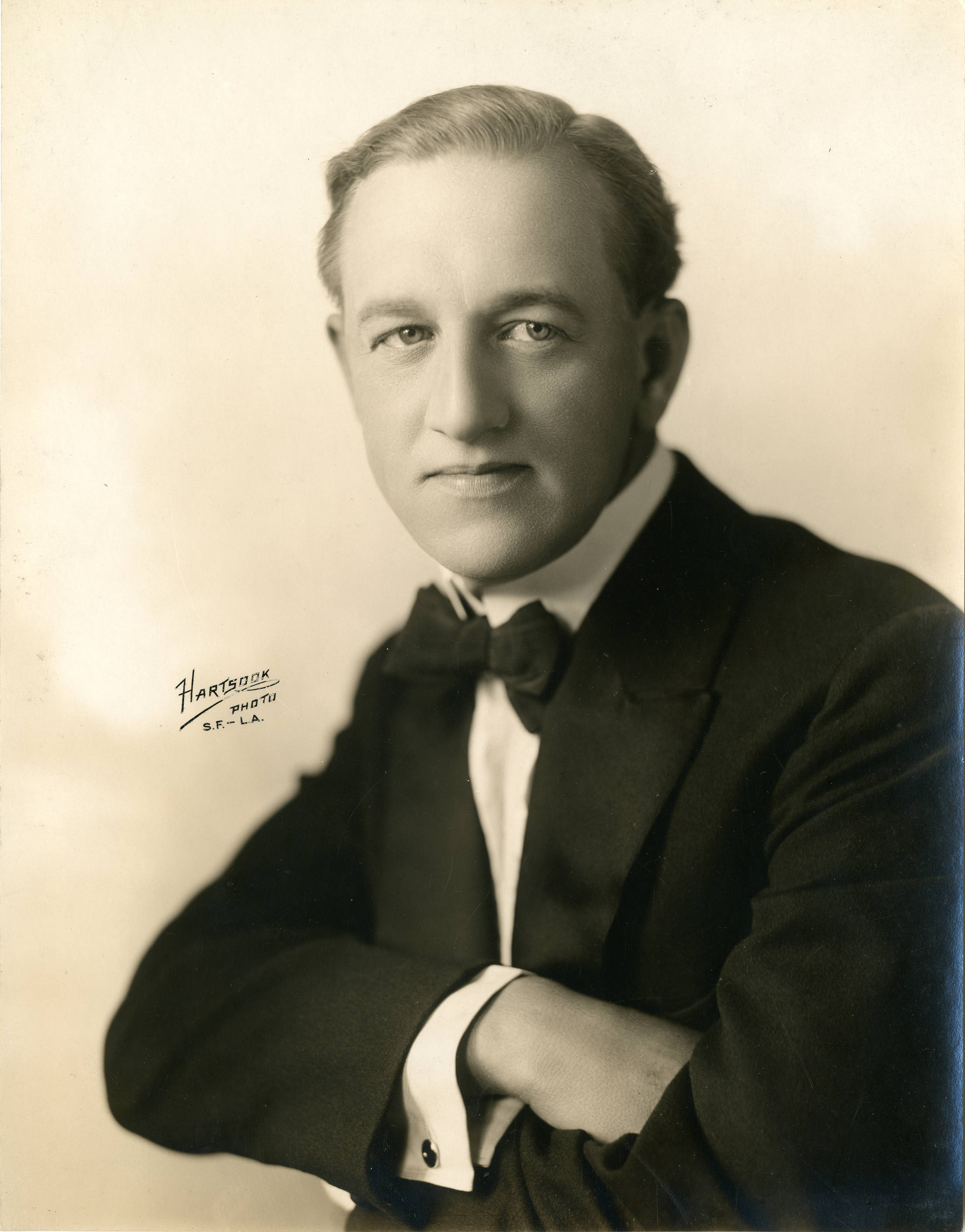
- Del Ruth in 1919
- Born: September 7, 1879; Delaware, U.S.
- Died: May 15, 1958 (aged 78); Woodland Hills, Los Angeles, California, U.S.
- Occupations: Actor, director, screenwriter, producer
- Years active: 1913–33
- Spouse(s): Helen Carlyle; Alta Allen (m. 1920 – ?)

Hampton Del Ruth (September 7, 1879 – May 15, 1958) was an American film actor, director, screenwriter, and film producer. Among other work, he wrote the intertitles for the final American studio-made silent film Legong: Dance of the Virgins (1935).

Del Ruth began working in film in 1913 and continued until the early 1930s. He also wrote at least two novels: Port o' Heart's Desire (1926) and Without Restraint (1936). He was the older brother of film director Roy Del Ruth and uncle of cinematographer Thomas Del Ruth.

== Selected filmography ==
Year	Title	Role	Notes
1913	His Father		—
1913	The Tie of the Blood	—	Writer
1914	Love and Politics	—	Story
1914	Tillie's Punctured Romance	Tall Secretary Searching for Tillie	Writer (uncredited)
1915	The Great Vacuum Robbery	—	Scenario
1917	Are Waitresses Safe?	—	Director
1917	Done in Oil	—	Writer
1918	Watch Your Neighbor	–	Director
1918	She Loved Him Plenty	—	Director
1918	She Loved Him Plenty	—	Scenario
1919	The Roaming Bathtub	—	Story
1920	A Lightweight Lover	—	Story
1920	Chicken à la Cabaret	—	Director
1921	Skirts	—	Director
1921	The Invisible Fear	—	Story
1922	The Marriage Chance	—	Director, writer
1923	A Friendly Husband	—	Writer
1924	Smile Please	—	Director
1924	Just a Good Guy	—	Director
1925	The Soapsuds Lady	—	Story
1926	Transcontinental Limited	—	Adaptation
1927	Naughty	—	Writer, director
1927	Blondes by Choice	—	Director
1928	A Simple Sap	—	Director, writer
1929	The Old Barn	—	Writer
1929	The Bees' Buzz	—	Writer
1929	Girl Crazy	—	Story
1930	Sugar Plum Papa	—	Writer
1930	The Love Punch	—	Writer
1931	In Old Mazuma	—	Writer
1931	The Mystery Train	—	Story, scenario
1931	Air Eagles	—	Scenario
1932	A Strange Adventure	—	Dialogue, director
1933	Goodbye Love	—	Story, writer
