= The Lord's Prayer (Albert Hay Malotte song) =

Musical setting of the Lord's Prayer, composed by Albert Hay Malotte

"The Lord's Prayer" is a musical setting of the biblical Lord's Prayer, composed by Albert Hay Malotte in 1935, and recorded by many notable singers. According to his New York Times obituary: "Mr. Malotte's musical setting of 'The Lord's Prayer' was the first one that achieved popularity, although the prayer had been set to music many times before." Malotte dedicated the song to baritone John Charles Thomas, whose radio performances introduced it to the public.

== Notable versions ==
Many artists have recorded the song. John Charles Thomas produced the first 78 rpm disc in 1936. Gracie Fields sang the song in the 1943 film Stage Door Canteen. Mario Lanza sang the song in the musical film Because You're Mine (1952), hitting a high B flat. In September 2009, Andrea Bocelli recorded the song with the Mormon Tabernacle Choir for broadcast on a PBS Christmas program. The song was also released on Bocelli's album My Christmas.
