= Stowaway (1932 film) =

1932 film

- Directed by: Phil Whitman
- Screenplay by: Norman Springer
- Produced by: Samuel Freedman
- Starring: Fay Wray; Leon Ames; Montagu Love; Lee Moran; Roscoe Karns
- Cinematography: Leon Shamroy
- Edited by: Milton Carruth
- Production company: Universal Pictures
- Distributed by: Universal Pictures
- Release date: March 1, 1932
- Running time: 54 minutes
- Country: United States
- Language: English

Stowaway is a 1932 American pre-Code romance film directed by Phil Whitman, written by Norman Springer, and starring Fay Wray, Leon Ames, Montagu Love, Lee Moran, and Roscoe Karns. It was released on March 1, 1932, by Universal Pictures.

== Cast ==
- Fay Wray as Mary Foster
- Leon Ames as Tommy
- Montagu Love as Groder
- Lee Moran as Mackie
- Roscoe Karns as Insp. Redding
- Knute Erickson as Capt. Grant
- Paul Porcasi as Tony
- Betty Francisco as Madge
