= Skirts (film) =

1921 film

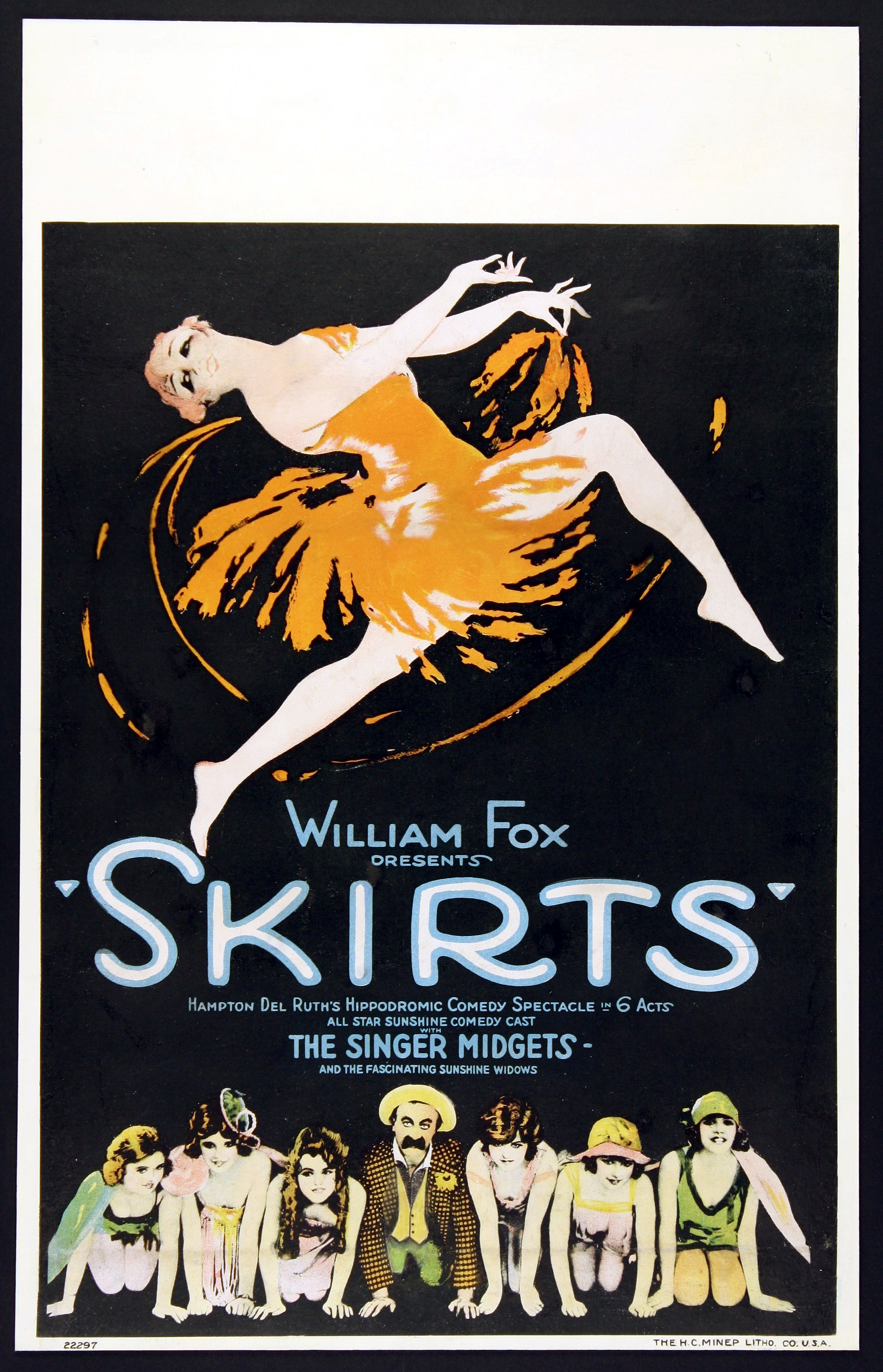
- Theatrical release poster
- Directed by: Hampton Del Ruth
- Written by: Hampton Del Ruth
- Produced by: William Fox; Henry Lehrman
- Starring: Clyde Cook; Chester Conklin; Polly Moran; Jack Cooper; Billy Armstrong; Ethel Teare
- Production company: Fox Film Corporation
- Distributed by: Fox Film Corporation
- Release date: April 10, 1921
- Running time: 50 minutes
- Country: United States
- Language: Silent (English intertitles)

Skirts is a lost 1921 American silent comedy film directed by Hampton Del Ruth and starring Clyde Cook, Chester Conklin, Polly Moran, Jack Cooper, Billy Armstrong, and Ethel Teare. The film was released by Fox Film Corporation on April 10, 1921.

== Cast ==
- Clyde Cook as Peter Rocks Jr.
- Chester Conklin
- Polly Moran
- Jack Cooper
- Billy Armstrong
- Ethel Teare
- Glen Cavender
- Slim Summerville
- Harry McCoy
- Bobby Dunn
- Tom Kennedy
- Edgar Kennedy
- Billy Franey
- Harry Booker
- Alta Allen
- Laura La Varnie
- Alice Davenport
- The Singer Midgets

== Censorship ==
Initially, Skirts was rejected in its entirety by the Kansas Board of Review, but was later passed with cuts. Before its release, the board required the prologue to be shortened, eliminating the scene where a man and woman place a leaf on a body "suggestively."

== Preservation ==
With no holdings located in archives, the film is now considered lost.

== See also ==
- 1937 Fox vault fire
