= Hi, Gaucho! =

1935 film directed by Tommy Atkins

- Directed by: Tommy Atkins
- Screenplay by: Adele Buffington
- Story by: Tommy Atkins
- Produced by: John E. Burch(associate producer)
- Starring: John Carroll; Steffi Duna; Rod La Rocque; Montagu Love
- Cinematography: Jack MacKenzie
- Edited by: Fred Knudtson
- Production company: RKO Radio Pictures
- Release date: October 11, 1935 (US)
- Running time: 59 minutes
- Country: United States
- Language: English

Hi, Gaucho! is a 1935 American comedy film directed by Tommy Atkins (who also wrote the story), from a screenplay by Adele Buffington. Released by RKO Radio Pictures on October 11, 1935, the film stars John Carroll (in his first credited role), Steffi Duna, Rod La Rocque, and Montagu Love.
