= The Important Witness =

1933 film directed by Sam Newfield

- Lobby card for the film
- Directed by: Sam Newfield
- Screenplay by: Douglas Doty
- Story by: Gordon Morris
- Produced by: Sigmund Neufeld
- Starring: Noel Francis; Dorothy Burgess; Donald Dillaway
- Cinematography: Harry Forbes
- Edited by: Al Clark
- Production company: Tower Productions
- Release date: November 10, 1933 (US)
- Running time: 64 minutes
- Country: United States
- Language: English

The Important Witness is a 1933 American pre-Code crime drama film directed by Sam Newfield which stars Noel Francis, Dorothy Burgess, and Donald Dillaway.

== Cast ==
- Noel Francis as Ellen Kelly
- Dorothy Burgess as Ruth Dana
- Donald Dillaway as Steve Connors
- Noel Madison as Gus Miranda
- Robert Ellis as Jack (Duke Farnham)
- Charles Delaney as Joe Murphy
- Paul Fix as Tony
- Ben Hendricks Jr. as Red Getchel
- Ethel Wales as Bride
- Gladys Blake
- Mary Dunn
- John Deering
