= Phil Whitman =

American film director

- Born: 1893; New York City, United States
- Died: January 10, 1935 (aged 41–42); United States
- Occupations: Director, writer, cinematographer
- Years active: 1917–1934 (film)

Phil Whitman (1893–1935) was an American screenwriter, cinematographer and film director. During the silent era he scripted and directed a large number of short films for Mack Sennett including those starring Billy Bevan. In the early sound era he began directing feature films for studios such as Monogram Pictures.

== Selected filmography ==
- The Good-Bye Kiss (1928)
- Air Eagles (1931)
- The Mystery Train (1931)
- A Strange Adventure (1932)
- The Girl from Calgary (1932)
- Stowaway (1932)
- His Private Secretary (1933)
- Police Call (1933)

== Bibliography ==
- Drew, Bernard A. Motion Picture Series and Sequels: A Reference Guide. Routledge, 2013.
- Pitts, Michael R. Poverty Row Studios, 1929–1940: An Illustrated History of 55 Independent Film Companies, with a Filmography for Each. McFarland & Company, 2005.
- Walker, Brent E. Mack Sennett’s Fun Factory: A History and Filmography of His Studio and His Keystone and Mack Sennett Comedies, with Biographies of Players and Personnel. McFarland, 2013.
