= Tommy Atkins (director) =

American film director

- Born: July 18, 1887; Springfield, Massachusetts, Massachusetts, United States
- Died: June 18, 1968 (aged 80); Los Angeles, California, United States
- Occupation: Director
- Years active: 1920–35

Tommy Atkins (July 18, 1887 –June 18, 1968) was an American director of the silent and early sound film eras. Born on July 18, 1887, in Springfield, Massachusetts, he made his entrance into the film industry as the assistant director to Ralph Ince on the 1920 silent film Out of the Snows. Eight years later, he made another film, again as assistant director, for FBO Pictures on another silent film, Crooks Can't Win. He worked as the assistant director on another sixteen films between 1928 and 1934, the most notable of which was 1933's Morning Glory, directed by Lowell Sherman and starring Katharine Hepburn and Douglas Fairbanks Jr. In 1934 he directed his first picture, The Silver Streak, which was one of the top money-makers for RKO Pictures that year. He directed two more films, the second of which, Hi, Gaucho!, he also wrote the story for.

After Hi, Gaucho!, Atkins left the film industry for the most part, although he did return in 1940 as an associate producer on the Academy Award-nominated docudrama The Fight for Life, which was directed by Pare Lorentz, who also produced the film for the United States Film Service. Atkins died on June 18, 1968, in Los Angeles, California.

== Filmography ==
(Per AFI database)

All positions were as assistant director except where noted.

- Out of the Snows (1920)
- Blockade (1928)
- Crooks Can't Win (1928)
- Danger Street (1928)
- Hey Rube! (1928)
- Hit of the Show (1928)
- The Singapore Mutiny (1928)
- The Silver Horde (1930)
- Three Who Loved (1931)
- The Runaround (1931)
- Thirteen Women (1932)
- Men of Chance (1932)
- The Animal Kingdom (1932)
- Song of the Eagle (1933)
- Ann Vickers (1933)
- Christopher Strong (1933)
- Midshipman Jack (1933)
- Morning Glory (1933)
- Our Betters (1933)
- Murder on the Blackboard (1934)
- The Silver Streak (1934) - director
- Hi, Gaucho! (1935) - director, story
- Mutiny Ahead (1935) - director
- The Fight for Life (1940) - associate producer
