= The Almighty Dollar (1910 film) =

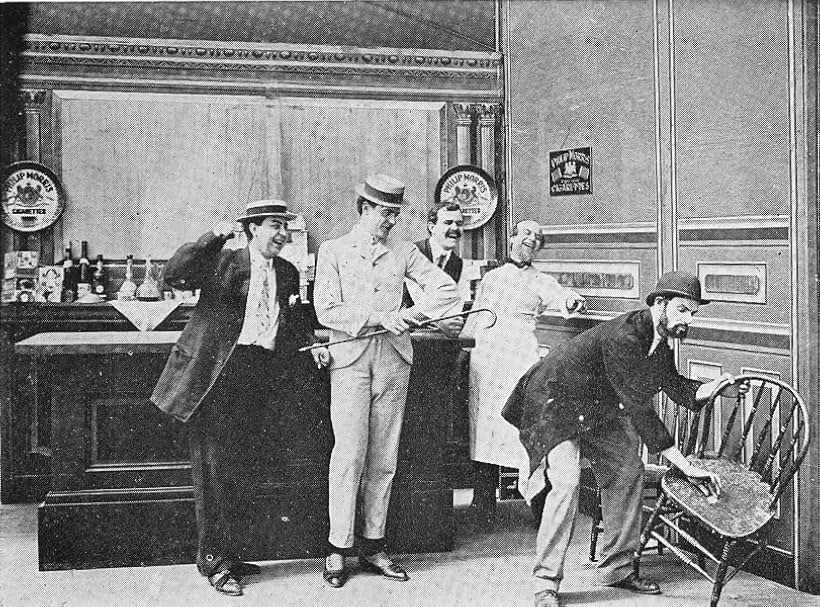
- Film still
- Produced by: Siegmund Lubin
- Starring: Harry C. Myers
- Distributed by: Lubin Manufacturing Company
- Release date: July 11, 1910
- Running time: in split-reel with The Highbinders
- Country: USA
- Language: Silent...English titles

The Almighty Dollar is a 1910 silent film comedy short produced by the Lubin Manufacturing Company. The film has an early appearance by Harry Myers and was released in split-reel form with The Highbinders.

A print is preserved in the Library of Congress collection.

== Cast ==
- Harry C. Myers
