= A Strange Adventure (1932 film) =

1932 film

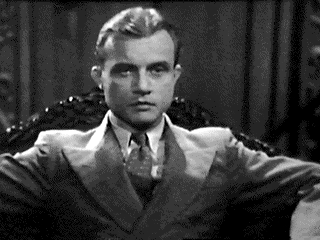
- Dwight Frye in the film
- Directed by: Phil Whitman
- Written by: Arthur Hoerl (story); Lee Chadwick; Hampton Del Ruth
- Produced by: I.E. Chadwick
- Starring: Regis Toomey; June Clyde; Lucille La Verne
- Cinematography: Leon Shamroy
- Edited by: Carl Pierson
- Music by: Abe Meyer
- Production company: Chadwick Pictures
- Distributed by: Monogram Pictures
- Release date: November 20, 1932
- Running time: 60 minutes
- Country: United States
- Language: English

A Strange Adventure is a 1932 American Pre-Code mystery film directed by Phil Whitman and starring Regis Toomey, June Clyde and Lucille La Verne. It is also known by the alternative title of The Wayne Murder Case.

== Plot ==
When disagreeable millionaire Silas Wayne is murdered in his mansion with a large crowd of guests present who "saw nothing", it is up to homicide detective Mitchell to discover which of Wayne's abused employees or greedy relatives might have committed the crime.

== Cast ==
- Regis Toomey as Detective-Sergeant Mitchell
- June Clyde as 'Nosey' Toodles
- Lucille La Verne as Miss Sheen
- Jason Robards Sr. as Dr. Bailey
- William V. Mong as Silas Wayne
- Eddie Phillips as Claude Wayne
- Dwight Frye as Robert Wayne
- Nadine Dore as Gloria Dryden
- Alan Roscoe as Stephen Boulter
- Isabel Vecki as Sarah Boulter

== Bibliography ==
- Gates, Phillipa. Detecting Women: Gender and the Hollywood Detective Film. SUNY Press, 2011.
