= The Cold Deck =

The Cold Deck may refer to:

- Glossary of poker terms#cold deck
- "The Cold Deck", a Judge Dredd story, part of Trifecta
- The Cold Deck (film), a 1917 American silent Western film
- Cold Deck, a 2015 Canadian thriller film
