= Leona Radnor =

American stage actress and screenwriter

- Occupation(s): Screenwriter, actress, author

Leona Radnor was an American stage actress, screenwriter, and author active in the early 1900s.

On Broadway, Radnor performed in The Marriage of William Ashe (1905).

Radnor published one of the earliest manuals on screenwriting, and contributed to a publication called Motion Picture Story Magazine. She also wrote scenarios for directors like Henry MacRae and Dell Henderson. She wrote other screenplays she did not receive credit for. Little is known about her life.

== Selected works ==
Screenplays:

- The Conspiracy (1916)
- An Up-to-Date Lochinvar (1913)
- The Birth of the Lotus Blossom (1912) (uncredited)
- The Making of a Man (1911) (uncredited)

Publications:

- The Photoplay Writer (1912)
