= Frontier Romance =

1929 film

- Directed by: Elmer Clifton
- Written by: Jack Cunningham
- Story by: Aubrey Scotto
- Produced by: Herbert T. Kalmus
- Starring: Allan Simpson; Nina Quartero; Arthur Clayton; Vic Young; Ted Oliver
- Cinematography: Allen M. Davey
- Production companies: Metro-Goldwyn-Mayer; Technicolor Corporation
- Distributed by: Metro-Goldwyn-Mayer
- Release date: June 13, 1929
- Country: United States
- Languages: Silent; English Intertitles

Frontier Romance is a 1929 MGM short silent film short in two-color Technicolor. It was the twelfth and final film produced as part of Metro-Goldwyn-Mayer's "Great Events" series. A romantic historical drama, the film depicts George Rogers Clark and other American colonists as they interact with Native American tribespeople.

== Production ==
The film was shot at the Tec-Art Studio in Hollywood.

== Preservation Status ==
Frontier Romance is believed to be lost.
