= My Best Girl =

1927 film by Sam Taylor

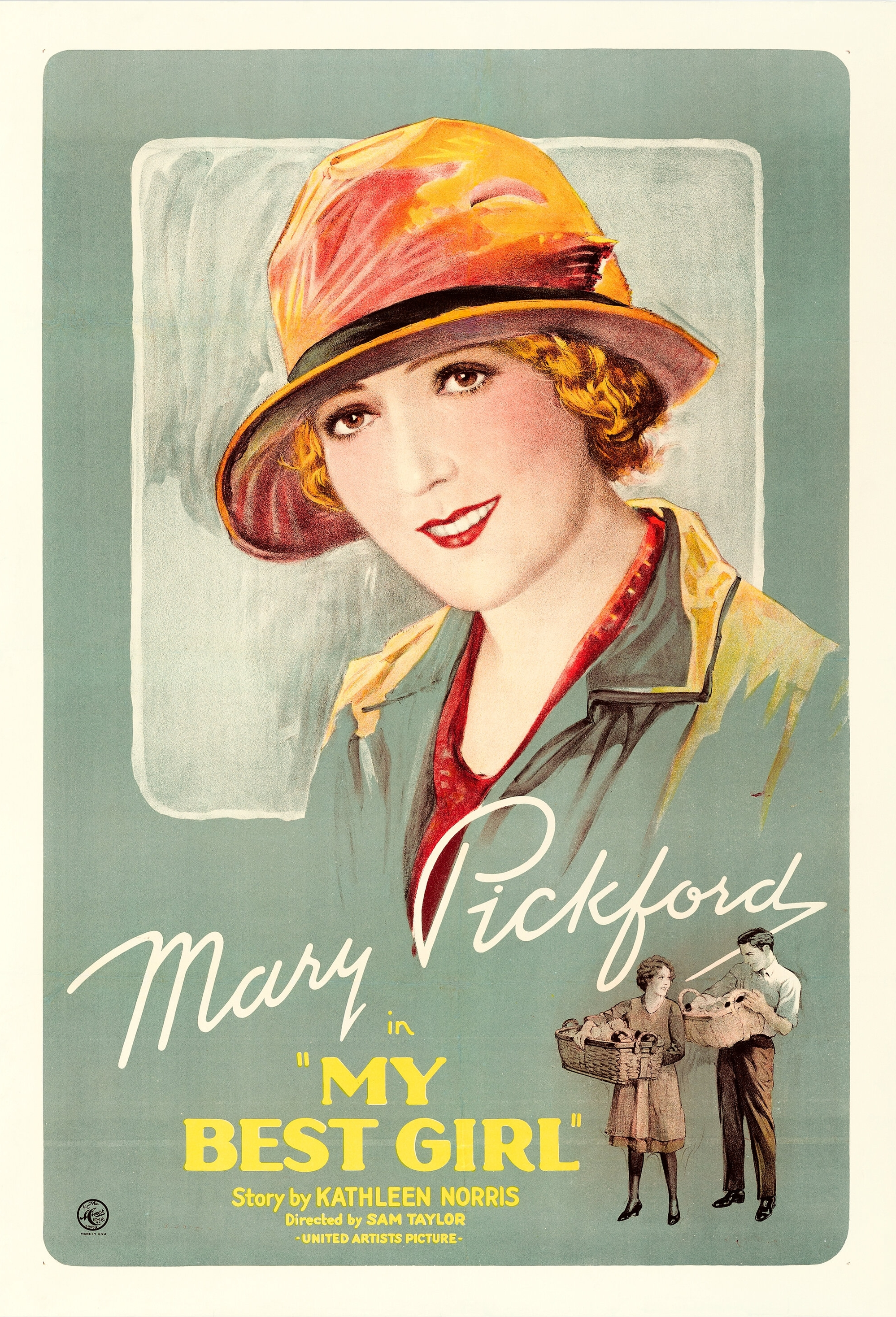
- Poster by H. C. Miner Litho Company
- Directed by: Sam Taylor
- Written by: Hope Loring (adaptation); Kathleen Norris (story)
- Produced by: Mary Pickford
- Starring: Mary Pickford; Charles "Buddy" Rogers
- Cinematography: David Kesson; Charles Rosher
- Production company: Mary Pickford Company
- Distributed by: United Artists
- Release dates: October 28, 1927 (Kansas City, Missouri, premiere)
- Running time: 79 minutes
- Country: United States
- Language: Silent (English intertitles)
- Budget: $483,103
- Box office: $1,027,757

My Best Girl (1927)

My Best Girl is a 1927 American silent romantic comedy film directed by Sam Taylor starring Mary Pickford and Charles "Buddy" Rogers that was produced by Pickford. It was adapted from the Kathleen Norris' story. Rogers later married Pickford. The film is extant and was screened at the Eastman Museum in 2015.

== Plot ==
The film starts out at The Merrill Department store where a very exhausted stockgirl named Maggie Johnson is given a moment to attend to the sales counter. There she encounters a charming, handsome man who pretends to be interested in purchasing some children's toys, but, after many humorous demonstrations by Maggie, the manager comes over and gives the man his time card. The man is said to be Joe Grant, but in reality, he is the owner's son, making him Joseph Merrill. To prove to his father that he is ready for his engagement, he has taken a job as a stockboy under an assumed name.

Annoyed, Maggie takes Joe back to the stockroom and tells him to get to work. He is so inept that she calls him 'The Dumbest Stockboy in the World,' though she promises to take him under her wing, much to his amusement.

After her shift a few days later, Maggie is outside waiting for Joe. She appears to have a crush on him. Some of her coworkers tease her, but eventually warn her that Joe is coming, causing Maggie to hop on her ride home from work: the back of an open truck. Joe is swarmed by salesgirls who try to get his attention, causing him to lose focus on Maggie. Determined Maggie throws her bag on the ground as the vehicle pulls away. Joe picks it up and chases the truck down to give it to her. After three more times of this, he finally grows weary and jumps in the truck to join Maggie, who feigns innocence.

The two flirt, and Maggie shows him pictures of her off-kilter family. Once they reach her home, she invites him in for supper, only to find her family is causing a commotion. Her father is an elderly postal worker who is meek and easily subdued. Her mother is a dramatic woman who enjoys going to random funerals and makes frequent use of smelling salts to avoid fainting. Her sister Liz is a flapper who has a boyfriend who gets her into trouble. Maggie does her best to hide the goings on, but eventually caves and sends Joe on his way, hoping to have dinner with him another day.

After some time passes, Joe's mother is planning his engagement announcement party. However, she has not mentioned it to him, hoping to make it a surprise. Joe has been promoted and is now Maggie's boss. However, he still eats lunch with her every day in the stockroom. During one such lunch, after receiving the note to join his parents for dinner (for the surprise party), Maggie gives him a watch for his birthday. He is touched and puts it on. Shortly after this, he accidentally catches his sleeve on a nail. Trying to pull himself free, he accidentally puts his arm around Maggie, and after the mutual surprise, the two kiss.

Enamored with each other, they head out on the town to walk in the rain. Joe begins to spend money, and she tells him he'll end up in the poorhouse. Joe offers to buy her dinner at a nice restaurant, but, embarrassed by her shoddy work clothes, Maggie declines. Joe gets the idea to tell her they should follow the store's company motto, "We're all a family," and that, if they were family, they could eat at the Merrill Mansion. Maggie, thinking he is joking, agrees. Meanwhile, her sister is arrested for associating with her boyfriend and taken to night court. Her family frets at not being able to find Maggie, who they believe needs to help Liz out of the mess. Maggie had tried to call them, but after a few rings (while her father made his way to the phone), she hung up.

Upon arriving at the Merrill Mansion, Maggie is amazed to find it is the real deal. Joe is amused by her reluctance but eventually gets her into the mansion, much to the butler's amusement. Maggie is extremely reluctant until Joe convinces the butler to say, "A Merrill employee eats here almost every night!" Maggie relaxes and tells Joe they should pretend to be Mr. and Mrs. Merrill. Joe is extremely amused by this and by her lack of formal dinner habits.

At the surprise engagement party, Joe's family sits concerned. They return home and see Joe, but Maggie has hidden under the table. Joe admits he is 'Joseph Merrill,' but before he can explain further, his fiancée arrives and kisses him in front of Maggie. Maggie, heartbroken, leaves. Joe, upset, tells his fiancée that he has broken Maggie's heart and that he must go after her.

Maggie walks and walks until she returns to the night court where she and Joe had shared a moment. She sees her family arrive, and, after they chastise her, they enter the court to try to save Liz from prison. Meanwhile, Joe arrives at the same spot only to be helped by a homeless man who had watched their interactions. Joe enters the court to hear Maggie's passionate plea for her sister, whom the judge eventually lets go.

While Maggie fetches water for her 'on the verge of fainting' mother, Joe walks over to her and apologizes, saying he does not love his fiancée and will not marry her. He then proposes to Maggie, which causes her sister (for a change) to faint. While everyone tries to revive Liz, Liz's boyfriend makes a remark to her father about Maggie "taking up with the Merrill boy," implying that it was only for sex. Offended, Joe punches him and begins fighting in the courtroom.

The next day, Maggie is back home, reading the paper, which has headlines about their romance. Joe's father arrives at the home. He tells Maggie he wants to send his son to Hawaii until the scandal blows over, and Joe agrees. However, Joe apparently made plans to bring Maggie as well and marry on the boat. Mr. Merrill, not happy with this, tries to buy Maggie off with a $10,000 check just as Joe arrives, unaware that his father is there. Joe tells Maggie his plans, and she becomes upset. Angry, she launches into a tirade against him, trying to find out whether he really loved her. She begins to claim that she is just a jazz girl and that she knew who he was all along. That she was a gold digger, just after his money, and that, thanks to his father, she now had what she wanted. She even plays a jazz record and puts on lipstick in an attempt to prove her point.

Joe begins to cry, and Maggie, touched, breaks down and admits that none of it is true, and that the real reason she cannot go away with him is her family (who had been listening in the living room the whole time), who need her more than he does. Her father becomes livid, declares it is time "he became the father of the family," and takes charge of his wife and daughters. In a comedic scene, he commands everyone (including both Merrills) to pack Maggie's things for the ship, which leaves in ten minutes.

After an extreme car ride, the couple barely makes it to the departing boat. Once boarded, the father realizes he never gave Maggie her suitcase. He tries to throw the suitcase onto the boat, but it ends up in the ocean. The couple waves goodbye and eventually gets crowded back from view. When the crowd leaves, we see the couple kissing.

== Cast ==
- Mary Pickford as Maggie Johnson
- Charles "Buddy" Rogers as Joseph 'Joe' Grant (Merrill)
- Sunshine Hart as Ma Johnson
- Lucien Littlefield as Pa Johnson
- Carmelita Geraghty as Elizabeth 'Liz' Johnson
- Hobart Bosworth as Father Robert E. Merrill
- Evelyn Hall as Mother Esther Merrill
- Millicent Rogers as Avonne Taylor
- Mack Swain as the judge
- Carole Lombard as flirty salesgirl (uncredited)

== Release ==
The film was first released in 1927. It had a budget of $483,103 and grossed about $1,027,757 in the US alone on its first run.

== Legacy ==
The film's copyright expired in 2023, and entered the public domain along with other works from 1927. A complete print of the film survives in mostly good condition. It was released on DVD by The Milestone Collection and The Mary Pickford Corporation in 1998.

My Best Girl was restored in 2015 by the UCLA Film and Television Archive based on the Archive's earlier restoration, which combines the best shots from two 35mm acetate fine grain master positives owned by the Mary Pickford Foundation and a 1940s-era 16mm print from the Mary Pickford Collection at the Library of Congress, and features remade titles to improve the overall appearance of the film. The new restoration was first shown as part of the 17th edition of the UCLA Film and Television Archive's biennial "Festival of Preservation" in 2015.

Pickford biographer Jeffrey Vance, quoted in the UCLA Film and Television Archive's "Festival of Preservation" 2015 program notes, relates, "What makes My Best Girl special is that it captures the miracle of two people falling in love with each other as their characters do. It is challenging to capture genuine emotion on a cold piece of celluloid, but falling in love is beautifully immortalized in My Best Girl."

On October 31, 2017 the restaurant Best Girl opened on the ground floor of the Ace Hotel in downtown Los Angeles, 90 years from the release date of the movie and named in its honor.
