= The Conspiracy (1916 film) =

1916 film

- Directed by: Henry MacRae
- Written by: William Parker; Leona Radnor
- Starring: Harry Carey
- Release date: October 21, 1916
- Running time: 2 reels
- Country: United States
- Language: Silent (English intertitles)

The Conspiracy is a 1916 American silent drama film directed by Henry MacRae and featuring Harry Carey.

== Cast ==
- Harry Carey as Dick Olney
- Edith Johnson as Marjorie Montague
- Lee Shumway (as Leon C. Shumway) as Hodges
- Edwin Wallock (as E.N. Wallack) as Matthew Montague - Marjorie's Father

== Reception ==
Like many American films of the time, The Conspiracy was subject to cuts by city and state film censorship boards. The Chicago Board of Censors required cuts of the intertitle "Pour that in her glass, do you understand?" flash scenes involving gambling and the scene showing a suicide.

== See also ==
- List of American films of 1916
