= The Price Mark =

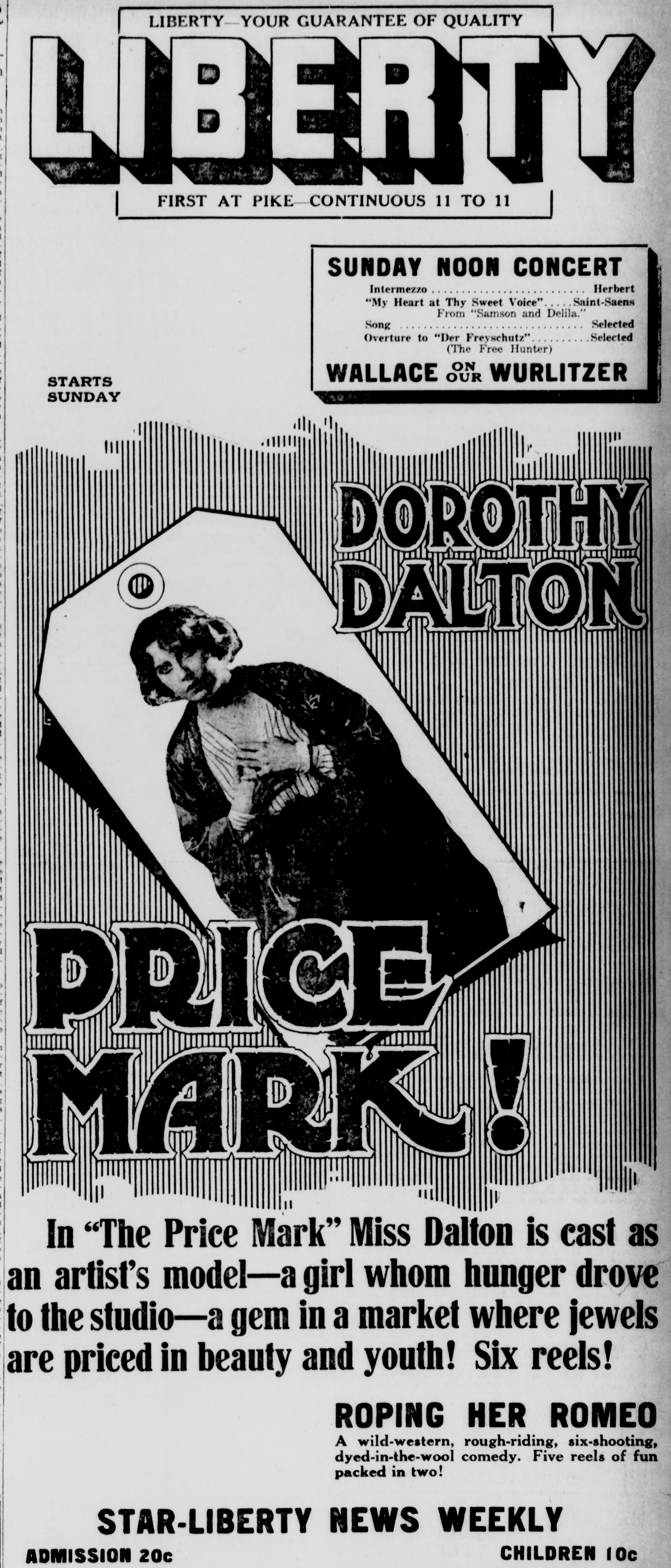
- Contemporary advertisement
- Directed by: Roy William Neill
- Screenplay by: John B. Ritchie
- Produced by: Thomas H. Ince
- Starring: Dorothy Dalton; William Conklin; Thurston Hall; Adele Farrington; Edwin Wallock; Dorcas Matthews
- Cinematography: John Stumar
- Production company: Thomas H. Ince Productions
- Distributed by: Paramount Pictures
- Release date: October 21, 1917
- Running time: 50 minutes
- Country: United States
- Language: Silent (English intertitles)

The Price Mark is a 1917 American silent drama film directed by Roy William Neill and written by John B. Ritchie. The film stars Dorothy Dalton, William Conklin, Thurston Hall, Adele Farrington, Edwin Wallock and Dorcas Matthews. The film was released on October 21, 1917, by Paramount Pictures.

== Cast ==
- Dorothy Dalton as Paula Lee
- William Conklin as Fielding Powell
- Thurston Hall as Dr. Daniel Melfi
- Adele Farrington as Marie
- Edwin Wallock as Hassan
- Dorcas Matthews as Nakhla
- Clio Ayres as Belle de Fargo

== Preservation status ==
- A print is preserved in the Library of Congress collection.
