= Men of the North =

1930 film

- Directed by: Hal Roach
- Screenplay by: Richard Schayer
- Story by: Willard Mack
- Produced by: George E. Kann
- Starring: Gilbert Roland; Barbara Leonard; Arnold Korff; Robert Elliott; George Davis
- Cinematography: Ray Binger
- Edited by: Tom Held
- Production company: Metro-Goldwyn-Mayer
- Distributed by: Metro-Goldwyn-Mayer
- Release date: September 27, 1930
- Running time: 64 minutes
- Country: United States
- Language: English

Men of the North is a 1930 American Western film directed by Hal Roach and written by Richard Schayer from a story by Willard Mack. The film stars Gilbert Roland, Barbara Leonard, Arnold Korff, Robert Elliott and George Davis. The film was released on September 27, 1930, by Metro-Goldwyn-Mayer. It is notable as the only film Roach made as a director-for-hire, as he normally functioned as a producer.

== Plot ==
Men of the North (1930)

Louis, a charming French-Canadian, is accused of stealing gold from a mine by Mountie Sergeant Mooney after getting a tip from Louis' girl friend, Woolie-Woolie, who correctly suspects he has fallen in love with Nedra, the mine owner's daughter. Louis has to work hard to prove his innocence, even to the point of saving other characters' lives in a series of incidents.

== Cast ==
- Gilbert Roland as Louis La Bey
- Barbara Leonard as Nedra Ruskin
- Arnold Korff as John Ruskin
- Robert Elliott as Sergeant Mooney
- George Davis as Corporal Smith
- Nina Quartero as Woolie-Woolie
- Robert Graves as Priest

== Production notes ==
According to the AFI Catalog, it was simultaneously filmed in Spanish, French, German and Italian versions, all directed by Roach. The Mexican-born Roland also appeared in the Spanish version, while the multi-lingual Leonard appeared in the French, German and Italian versions.

Although Roach did not produce the picture, he did give bit parts (in the English version) to two of his contract players, Charlie Hall and Our Gang member Dorothy DeBorba.
