= Tom O'Brien (actor, born 1890) =

American actor (1890–1947)

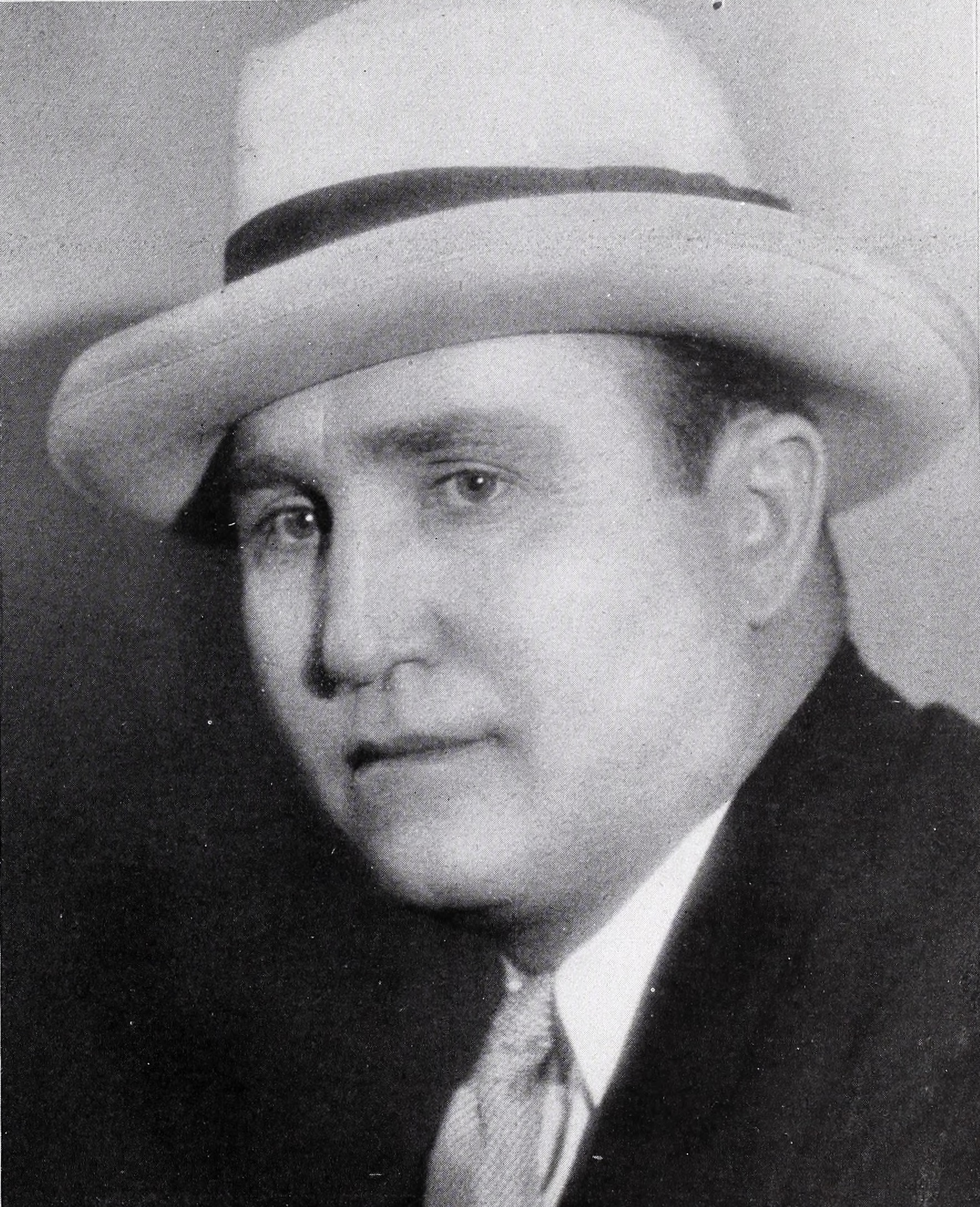
- O'Brien in 1925
- Born: Thomas Everett O'Brien; July 25, 1890; San Diego, California
- Died: June 8, 1947 (aged 56); Los Angeles, California
- Burial place: Forest Lawn Memorial Park, Glendale
- Occupation: Actor

Tom O'Brien (July 25, 1890 – June 8, 1947) was an American silent and sound character actor known for his burly serio-comic roles.

He worked in the comedy film The Gentleman from America (1923) as Johnny Day, which is about the humorous tale of two American buddies (O'Brien and Hoot Gibson) and they have numerous adventures in Spain. Tom O'Brien appeared in over 80 films in a 22 years of career. He was primarily cast as stocky "Irish types" in comic supporting roles. He also worked in The Big Parade (1925) as Corporal Bull O'Hara.

He was buried at Forest Lawn Memorial Park, Glendale.

== Filmography ==
=== Feature films ===
- The Murder in the Museum (1934) as Alfred Carr
- The Woman Condemned (1934) as First Detective
- Only Yesterday (1933)
- Lucky Dog (1933) as The Detective
- It's a Cinch (1932) as Spike
- The Night Mayor (1932) as Delaney
- The Phantom Express (1932) as Red Connelly, the Telegraph Operator
- The Unexpected Father (1932) as Policeman
- The Phantom (1931) as Police Sgt. Pat Collins
- Hell-Bent for Frisco (1931) as Fogarty
- Trapped (1931) as Joe Farley
- The Hawk (1931) as Killdane
- Midnight Special (1930) as Dan Padden
- Moby Dick (1930) as Starbuck
- Call of the West (1930) as Bull Clarkson
- Dance Hall (1929) as Truck Driver
- Dark Skies (1929) as Pete
- The Talk of Hollywood (1929) as Reel-Mixing Projectionist
- Untamed (1929) as Moran
- Broadway Scandals (1929) as Bill Gray
- Hurricane (1929) as Dugan
- Smiling Irish Eyes (1929) as Black Barney
- On with the Show! (1929) as box office operator
- The Flying Fool (1929) as Tom Dugan
- His Lucky Day (1929) as James, the Chauffeur
- It Can Be Done (1929) as Detective
- The Peacock Fan (1929) as Sgt. O'Brien
- The Office Scandal (1929) as Pool Hall Lookout
- The Last Warning (1929) as Inspector
- The Chorus Kid (1928) as Bill Whipple
- Anybody Here Seen Kelly? (1928) as Buck Johnson
- San Francisco Nights (1928) as 'Red'
- Outcast Souls (1928) as Officer
- That's My Daddy (1927) as Officer Patrick Moran
- The Private Life of Helen of Troy (1927) as Ulysses
- The Bugle Call (1927) as Sgt. Doolan
- Twelve Miles Out (1927) as Irish
- The Frontiersman (1927) as Abner Hawkins
- Rookies (1927) as Sgt. O'Brien
- Winners of the Wilderness (1927) as Timothy
- The Fire Brigade (1926) as Joe O'Neil
- Tin Hats (1926) as Sergeant McGurk
- The Flaming Forest (1926) as Mike
- The Winner (1926) as Slugger Martin
- Take It from Me (1926) as Taxi Driver
- The Runaway Express (1926) as Sandy McPherson
- Poker Faces (1926) as The Prizefighter
- Sally, Irene and Mary (1925) as Stage Manager
- The Last Edition (1925) as Bull, Job Foreman
- The Big Parade (1925) as Bull
- Crack o' Dawn (1925) as Stanley Steele
- White Fang (1925) as Matt
- Winning a Woman (1925) as Unknown role
- So This Is Marriage? (1924) as Riley
- Winner Take All (1924) as Dynamite Galloway
- Never Say Die (1924) as Gun Murray
- What Shall I Do? (1924) as Big Jim Brown
- Untamed Youth (1924) as Jim Larson
- Fools Highway (1924) as Philadelphia O'Brien
- Flapper Wives (1924) as Tim Callahan
- Tipped Off (1923) as Jim 'Pug' Murphy, Mildred's Brother
- The Gentleman from America (1923) as Johnny Day
- The Scarlet Car (1923) as Mitt Deagon
- Youth to Youth (1922) as Ralph Horry
- Up and Going (1922) as Sergeant Langley
- Their Mutual Child (1921) as Steve Dingle
- The Devil Within (1921) as Wansley
- Scrap Iron (1921) as Battling Burke
- The Sagebrusher (1920) as Charlie Dornewald
- Dangerous Hours (1919) as Bolshevik at Meeting
- Square Deal Sanderson (1919) as Williams
- The Mints of Hell (1919) as Unknown role

=== Short films ===
- Fun in the Clouds (1928, short) as The Director
- Pardon My Glove (1922, short) as The Champ
- Bucking Broadway (1922, short) as The Stage Manager
- A Hickory Hick (1922, short) as The Crooked Crook
- Plumb Crazy (1923, short) as Olie Margerine
- Spooks and Spasms (1917, short) as The Big V Riot Squad
- The Runaway Freight (1914, short) as Slim, a Yeggman
- McCarn Plays Fate (1914, short) as Bull Klein

== Bibliography ==
- Neste, Dan Van (17 March 2017). The Magnificent Heel: The Life and Films of Ricardo Cortez. BearManor Media. p. 592.
