= Hervey Libbert =

American art director

- Born: March 23, 1901; Indiana, United States
- Died: June 23, 1953 (aged 52); Ventura, California, United States
- Occupation: Art director
- Years active: 1925-1930 (film)

Hervey Libbert (1901–1953) was an American art director. He was employed by Tiffany Pictures in the late silent and early sound era on films such as Lucky Boy and Peacock Alley.

== Selected filmography ==
- The Mystic (1925)
- The House of Scandal (1928)
- The Man in Hobbles (1928)
- Ladies of the Night Club (1928)
- Painted Faces (1929)
- Lucky Boy (1929)
- Mister Antonio (1929)
- The Lost Zeppelin (1929)
- Journey's End (1930)
- Peacock Alley (1930)
- Kathleen Mavourneen (1930)

== Bibliography ==
- Ankerich, Michael G. Mae Murray: The Girl with the Bee-Stung Lips. University Press of Kentucky, 2012.
- Bradley, Edwin M. Unsung Hollywood Musicals of the Golden Era: 50 Overlooked Films and Their Stars, 1929-1939. McFarland, 2016.
