= Allen M. Davey =

American cinematographer

- Born: Allen Millburn Davey; May 15, 1894; Bayonne, New Jersey, USA
- Died: March 5, 1946 (aged 51); Los Angeles, California, USA
- Occupation: Cinematographer
- Relatives: David Horsley (brother-in-law); Ray Rennahan (brother-in-law)

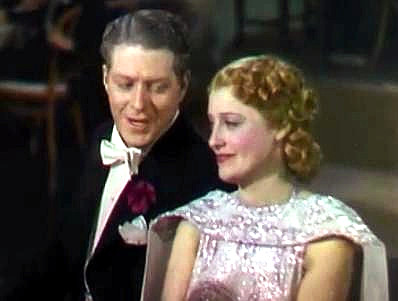
Nelson Eddy and Jeanette MacDonald in Sweethearts trailer 3.jpg

Allen M. Davey (May 15, 1894 – March 5, 1946) was an Academy Award–winning American cinematographer who had a long career in Hollywood, starting in the silent era and going through the mid-1940s. He was an early member of the American Society of Cinematographers and a longtime director of photography at Technicolor.

== Biography ==
Allen was born in Bayonne, New Jersey, to William Davey and Elizabeth Armstrong. His mother died when he was young, and the family later moved to Los Angeles, where Allen's sister Mary married director David Horsley.

Allen divorced his first wife, Margaret Bronaugh—a cabaret dancer—in 1917. He and his second wife, Margaret Rennahan, had two children together, including Allen Davey Jr. (who also became a cinematographer). (Margaret Rennahan's brother, Ray, was a D.P. as well.)

He began working as a cinematographer c. 1916. In 1938, he won an honorary Oscar for his work on Sweethearts with Oliver T. Marsh. He is also known for working as associate cinematographer on 1939's The Wizard of Oz.

== Filmography ==
- The Soul of Kura San (1917)
- The Golden Fetter (1917)
- Each to His Kind (1917)
- The Prison Without Walls (1917)
- The Lonesome Chap (1917)
- Heir of the Ages (1917)
- The Squaw Man's Son (1917)
- The Weaker Vessel (1919)
- The Blue Bonnet (1919)
- The Kentucky Colonel (1920)
- The Shadow (1921)
- Tillie (1922)
- The Heart Specialist (1922)
- South of Suva (1922)
- The Girl Who Ran Wild (1922)
- Fools and Riches (1923)
- Bavu (1923)
- Railroaded (1923)
- Sawdust (1923)
- The Eagle's Feather (1923)
- The Last Man on Earth (1924)
- Gold and the Girl (1925)
- Hearts and Spurs (1925)
- The Timber Wolf (1925)
- A Man of Nerve (1925)
- Durand of the Bad Lands (1925)
- Fightin' Jack (1926)
- Eyes Right! (1926)
- Cheaters (1927)
- The Bullet Mark (1928)
- A Princess of Destiny (1929)
- Frontier Romance (1929)
- Sweethearts (1938)
- Hollywood Cavalcade (1939)
- Typhoon (1940)
- Western Union (1941)
- Moon Over Miami (1941)
- Bahama Passage (1941)
- Hello Frisco, Hello (1943)
- Cover Girl (1944)
- A Song to Remember (1945)
