= The Eternal Woman =

1929 film

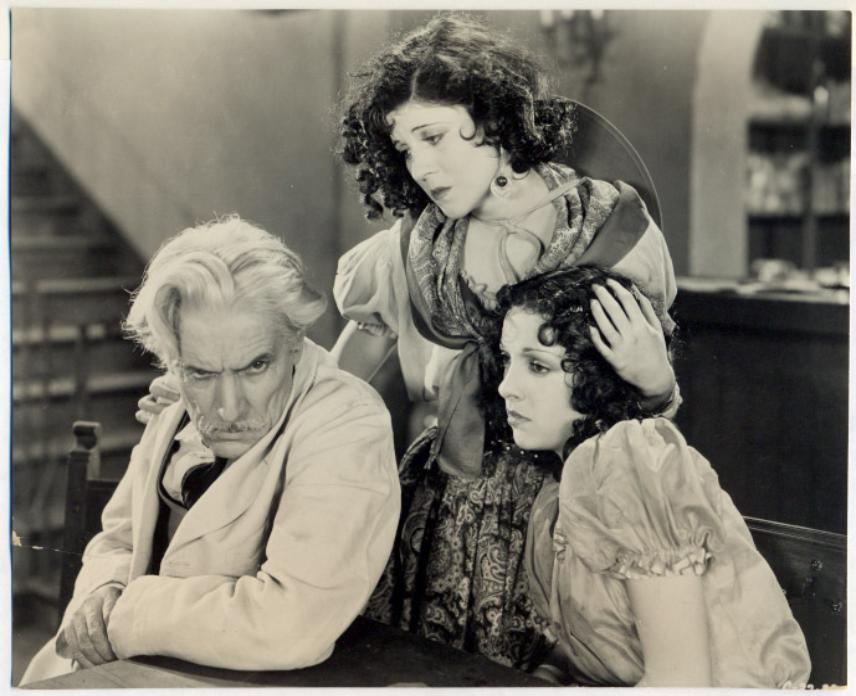
- Still with Josef Swickard, Nina Quartero, and Olive Borden
- Directed by: John P. McCarthy
- Written by: Wellyn Totman
- Starring: Olive Borden; Ralph Graves; Ruth Clifford
- Cinematography: Joseph Walker
- Edited by: Ben Pivar
- Production company: Columbia Pictures
- Distributed by: Columbia Pictures
- Release date: March 18, 1929
- Running time: 65 minutes
- Country: United States
- Languages: Silent; English intertitles

The Eternal Woman is a 1929 American silent drama film directed by John P. McCarthy and starring Olive Borden, Ralph Graves and Ruth Clifford. The film, 5,812 ft long, is set in Argentina.

== Plot ==
At an inn in Argentina run by her father, Doris Forbes meets up with her lover, Gil Martin, who is her husband's friend. Martin, however, has been carrying on with Anita, the innkeeper's other daughter, and made her believe a marriage was in their future. Martin kills the father and runs away with Anita; Doris seeks revenge. Sailing to America, she and her husband are the only survivors when the ship wrecks, and the two sisters confront the killer.

== Cast ==
- Olive Borden as Anita
- Ralph Graves as Hartley Forbes
- Ruth Clifford as Doris Forbes
- John Miljan as Gil Martin
- Nina Quartero as Consuelo
- Josef Swickard as Ovaldo
- Julia Swayne Gordon as Mrs. Forbes

== Production ==
Film Daily reported on March 5, 1929, that Ruth Clifford had been cast, and that a unit led by McCarthy with Clifford, Olive Borden, Ralph Graves, John Miljan, and Nina Quartero had left to film on location.

== Release ==
The film was released to theaters on March 18, 1929 by Columbia Pictures and was seen playing at Loew's in New York on April 1, 1929.

== Reception ==
A Film Daily review praised the screenplay and the performances of Graves and Borden, saying "Borden does her usual sexy stuff and is very effective"; Miljan was called "adequate". Billboard was not impressed with the casting of Borden for the role as the "hot-blooded Argentinian beauty", the movie's continuity, and the likelihood of certain plot points.

== Preservation ==
It is unknown whether the film survives as no copies have been located, likely lost.

== Bibliography ==
- Munden, Kenneth White. The American Film Institute Catalog of Motion Pictures Produced in the United States, Part 1. University of California Press, 1997.
