= Midnight Daddies =

1930 film

- Directed by: Mack Sennett
- Written by: Hampton Del Ruth; Harry McCoy; Earle Rodney; John A. Waldron
- Produced by: Mack Sennett
- Starring: Andy Clyde; Harry Gribbon; Rosemary Theby
- Cinematography: John W. Boyle
- Edited by: William Hornbeck
- Production company: Mack Sennett Comedies
- Distributed by: Sono Art-World Wide Pictures
- Release date: August 3, 1929
- Running time: 60 minutes
- Country: United States
- Language: English

Midnight Daddies is an All-Talking 1929 American pre-Code comedy film directed by Mack Sennett and starring Andy Clyde, Harry Gribbon, and Rosemary Theby. It was the last feature film that Sennett directed: his remaining six films were Bing Crosby shorts.

== Cast ==
- Andy Clyde as Wilbur Louder
- Harry Gribbon as Charlie Mason aka Charles De Maisone
- Rosemary Theby as Mrs. Wilbur Louder
- Addie McPhail as Trixie - Charlie's Sweetheart
- Alma Bennett as Camille McNab - Vamp
- Jack Cooper as Lord Rumsberry - Modiste Shop Owner
- Kathrin Clare Ward as Wilbur's Mother-in-law
- Vernon Dent as Baron von Twiddlebaum - Designer
- George Gray as Everett
- Anna Dodge as 1st Bridge Player
- Sunshine Hart as 2nd Bridge Player
- Wade Boteler as Bridge Kibitzer
- Mary Mayberry as Cigarette Girl
- Iris Adrian as Model

== See also ==
- List of early sound feature films (1926–1929)

== Bibliography ==
- Anthony Balducci. The Funny Parts: A History of Film Comedy Routines and Gags. McFarland, 2014.
