= Edwin Wallock =

American actor (1877–1951)

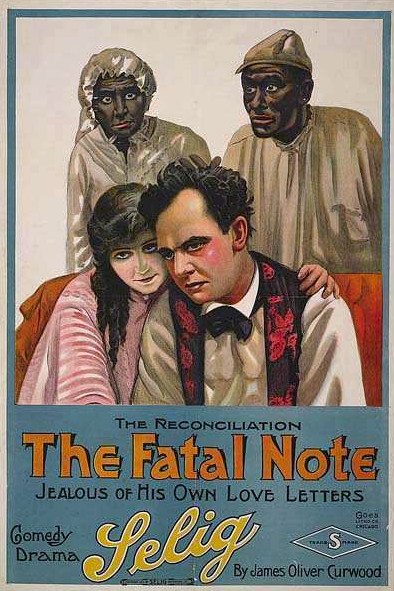
- Poster with Adele Lane and Edwin Wallock in The Fatal Note (1914)
- Born: November 6, 1877; Council Bluffs, Iowa, US
- Died: February 4, 1951 (aged 73); Los Angeles, California, US
- Years active: 1912-1923

Edwin Wallock (November 6, 1877 – February 4, 1951) was an American actor of the silent film era. He appeared in 60 films between 1912 and 1923. He was born in Council Bluffs, Iowa and died in Los Angeles, California.

== Selected filmography ==
- Behind the Lines (1916)
- The Conspiracy (1916)
- Guilty (1916)
- The Cold Deck (1917)
- The Price Mark (1917)
- Even As You and I (1917)
- Fame and Fortune (1918)
- Square Deal Sanderson (1919)
- Duds (1920)
- The Sagebrusher (1920)
- The Green Flame (1920)
- Kazan (1921)
- I Can Explain (1922)
- The Hunchback of Notre Dame (1923)
- Eyes of the Forest (1923)
