= The Man in Hobbles =

1928 film

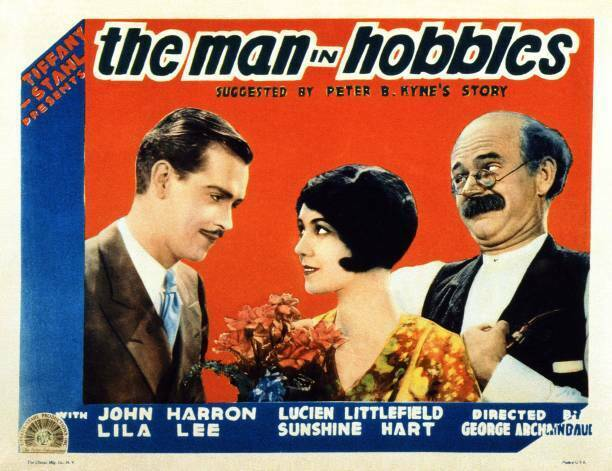
- Directed by: George Archainbaud
- Written by: Fanny Hatton; Frederic Hatton; Peter B. Kyne; Jack Natteford
- Produced by: John M. Stahl
- Starring: John Harron; Lila Lee; Lucien Littlefield
- Cinematography: Desmond O'Brien
- Edited by: Harry Jackson
- Production company: Tiffany-Stahl Productions
- Distributed by: Tiffany Pictures
- Release date: February 20, 1928
- Running time: 60 minutes
- Country: United States
- Languages: Silent; English intertitles

The Man in Hobbles is a 1928 American silent comedy film directed by George Archainbaud and starring John Harron, Lila Lee and Lucien Littlefield. The film's sets were designed by the art director Hervey Libbert.

== Cast ==
- John Harron as Joe Coleman
- Lila Lee as Ann Harris
- Lucien Littlefield as Pa Harris
- Betty Westmore as Gertie Harris
- Edward J. Nugent as Jake Harris
- William Anderson as Elmer Harris
- Vivien Oakland as Mrs. Maynard
- Sunshine Hart as Ma Harris

== Bibliography ==
- Bruce Babington & Charles Barr. The Call of the Heart: John M. Stahl and Hollywood Melodrama. Indiana University Press, 2018.
