= Barbara Leonard (actress) =

American actress (1908 – 1971)

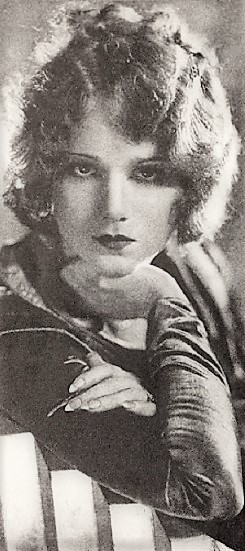
Barbara Leonard

Barbara Leonard (née Violet Arlene Anderson; 9 January 1908 – 2 July 1971) was an actress in the United States. Her most prolific time of acting was during 1930s, including a prominent starring role in Men of the North (1930).

She had reported various robberies throughout her life, and of being incapacitated during the alleged thefts.

== Family ==
She was married to a prominent piano teacher.

== Filmography ==
- Let Not Man Put Asunder (1924) as Polly De Bohun
- Ladies of the Night Club (1928) as Dimples Revere
- The Drake Case (1929) as Mrs. Drake
- The Bees' Buzz (1929) as Peggy
- Men of the North (1930) as Nedra Ruskin
- Scotland Yard as Nurse Cecilia
- One Romantic Night (1930) as Mitzi
- Son of the Gods (1930) as Mabel
- Bought (1931) as Mary Kiernan
- Beauty and the Boss (1932)
- The Crash (1932) as Celeste, the maid
- One Hour with You (1932) as Mitzi's Maid
- Love Afair as Felice
- The Man from Yesterday (1932) as Steve's girl
- Desirable (1934)
- Folies Bergère de Paris (1935) as Toinette
- The White Angel as Minna
- City in Darkness (1939) as Lola
