= Eyes of the Forest =

1923 film

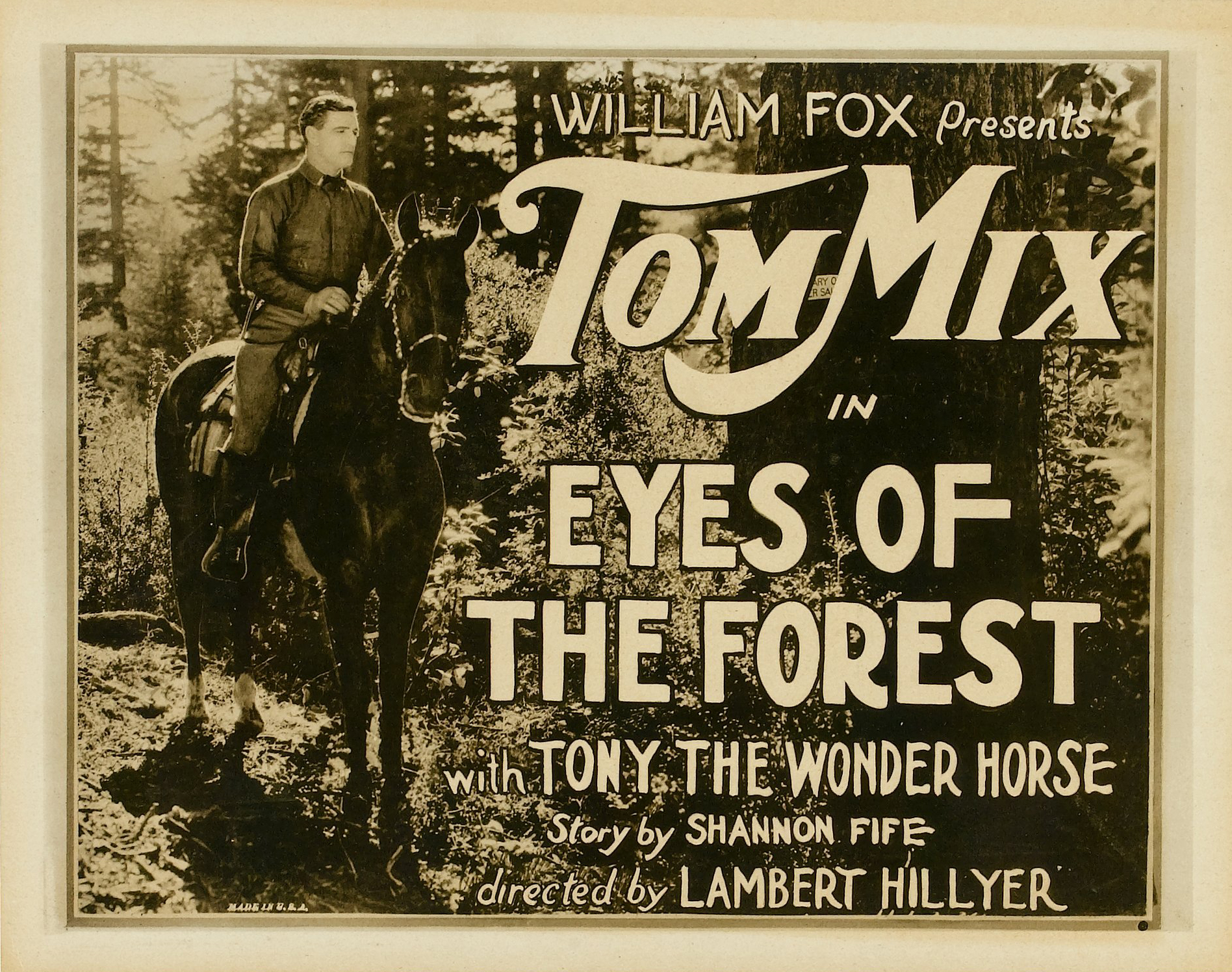
- Lobby card
- Directed by: Lambert Hillyer
- Screenplay by: LeRoy Stone
- Story by: Shannon Fife
- Starring: Tom Mix; Pauline Starke; Sid Jordan; Buster Gardner; J. P. Lockney; Thomas G. Lingham
- Cinematography: Daniel B. Clark
- Production company: Fox Film Corporation
- Distributed by: Fox Film Corporation
- Release date: December 30, 1923
- Running time: 50 minutes
- Country: United States
- Language: Silent (English intertitles)

Eyes of the Forest is a 1923 American silent Western film directed by Lambert Hillyer and written by LeRoy Stone. The film stars Tom Mix, Pauline Starke, Sid Jordan, Buster Gardner, J. P. Lockney, and Thomas G. Lingham. The film was released on December 30, 1923, by Fox Film Corporation.

== Plot ==
As described in a film magazine review, Bruce Thornton, Government Forest Ranger, while patrolling in his airplane is forced down by hostile timbermen. He finds Ruth Melier hiding in the woods from her husband Horgan, and says that she is suspected in the killing of her stepfather. After a series of confrontations, through Bruce's efforts Horgan is convicted of the murder. Bruce arrests some timber thieves and wins the affections of Ruth.

== Cast ==
- Tom Mix as Bruce Thornton
- Pauline Starke as Ruth Melier
- Sid Jordan as Horgan
- Buster Gardner as Sheriff
- J. P. Lockney as Jaol Fierro
- Thomas G. Lingham as Dr. Jerry MacGinnity
- Edwin Wallock as Julius Duvall
- Tony the Wonder Horse

== Production ==
Tom Mix and Tony the Wonder Horse were injured by a gunpowder explosion during filming. Mix and Tony were to pass through an area where the band of forest thieves had planted a mine as a trap. For filming, the charge was to be triggered about two seconds after the pair had passed the location, but due to an error in timing, it was detonated right as they passed the spot. The force of the explosion injured both Mix and his horse, knocking them both unconscious.

The film was shot on location in Santa Cruz.
