= Hearts and Spurs =

1925 film

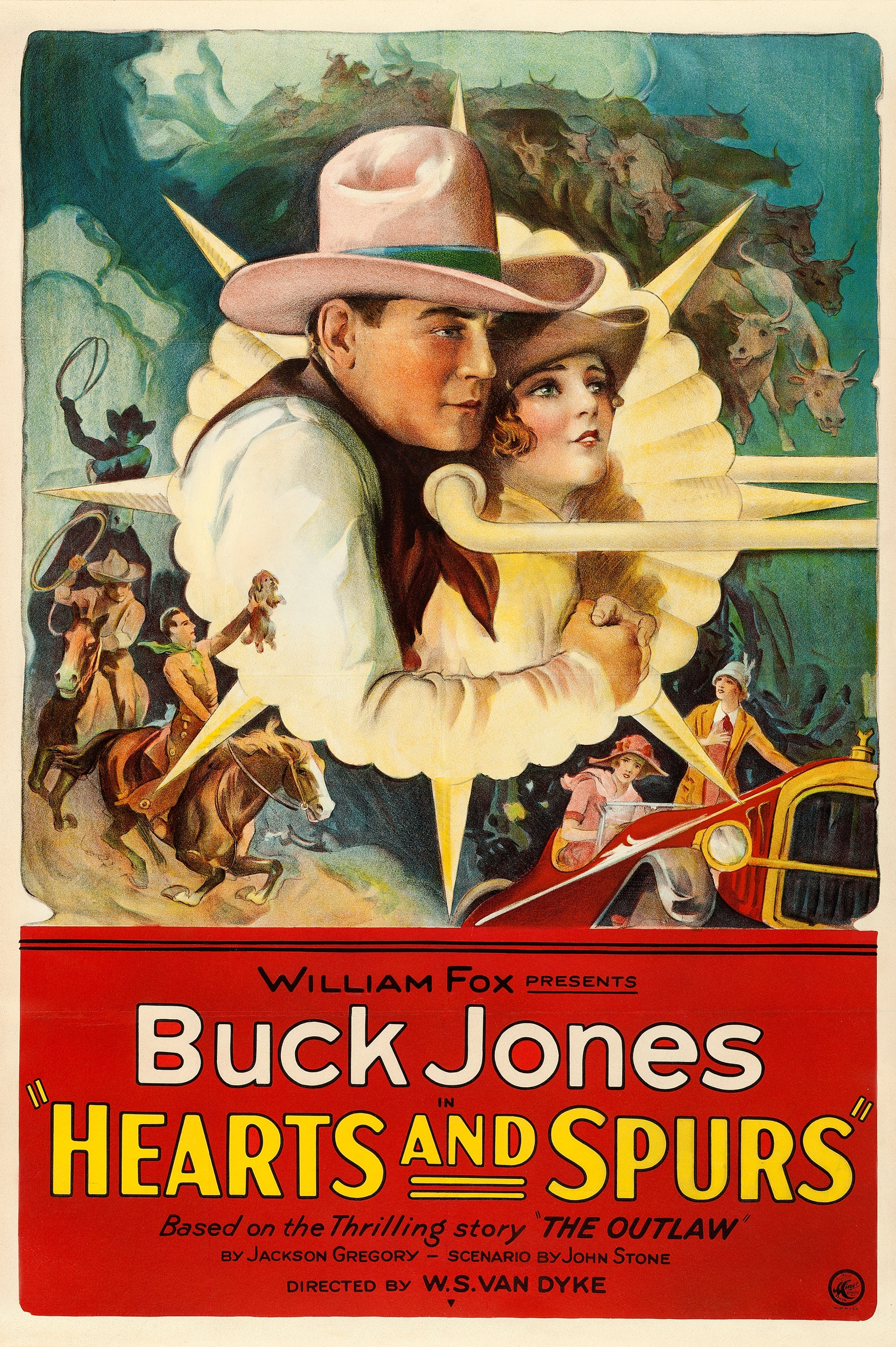
- Directed by: W.S. Van Dyke
- Written by: Jackson Gregory (story); John Stone
- Starring: Buck Jones; Carole Lombard; William B. Davidson
- Cinematography: Allen M. Davey
- Production company: Fox Film Corporation
- Distributed by: Fox Film Corporation
- Release date: June 7, 1925
- Running time: 50 minutes
- Country: United States
- Language: Silent (English intertitles)

Hearts and Spurs is a 1925 American silent Western film directed by W.S. Van Dyke and starring Buck Jones, Carole Lombard, and William B. Davidson. The film was partly shot on location in San Bernardino County. It received mixed reviews on its release.

== Plot ==
As described in a film magazine review, Sybil Estabrook, a young Eastern woman visits the ranch where her brother Oscar has been sent to make a man of himself. The brother has gotten himself in the clutches of a gambler who forces him to violate the law in order to pay off his poker debts. Hal, a young man, befriends Sybil and wins her gratitude and saves the brother from disgrace. The gambler is captured and then falls under some sliding boulders and is killed.

== Cast ==
- Buck Jones as Hal Emory
- Carole Lombard as Sybil Estabrook
- William B. Davidson as Victor Dufresne
- Freeman Wood as Oscar Estabrook
- Jean La Motte as Celeste
- J. Gordon Russell as Sid Thomas
- Walt Robbins as Terry Clark
- Charles Eldridge as The Sheriff
- Lucien Littlefield as Ford Driver

== Bibliography ==
- Goble, Alan. The Complete Index to Literary Sources in Film. Walter de Gruyter, 1999.
- Morgan, Michelle. Carole Lombard: Twentieth-Century Star. History Press, 2016.
