= Syncopating Sue =

1926 film by Richard Wallace

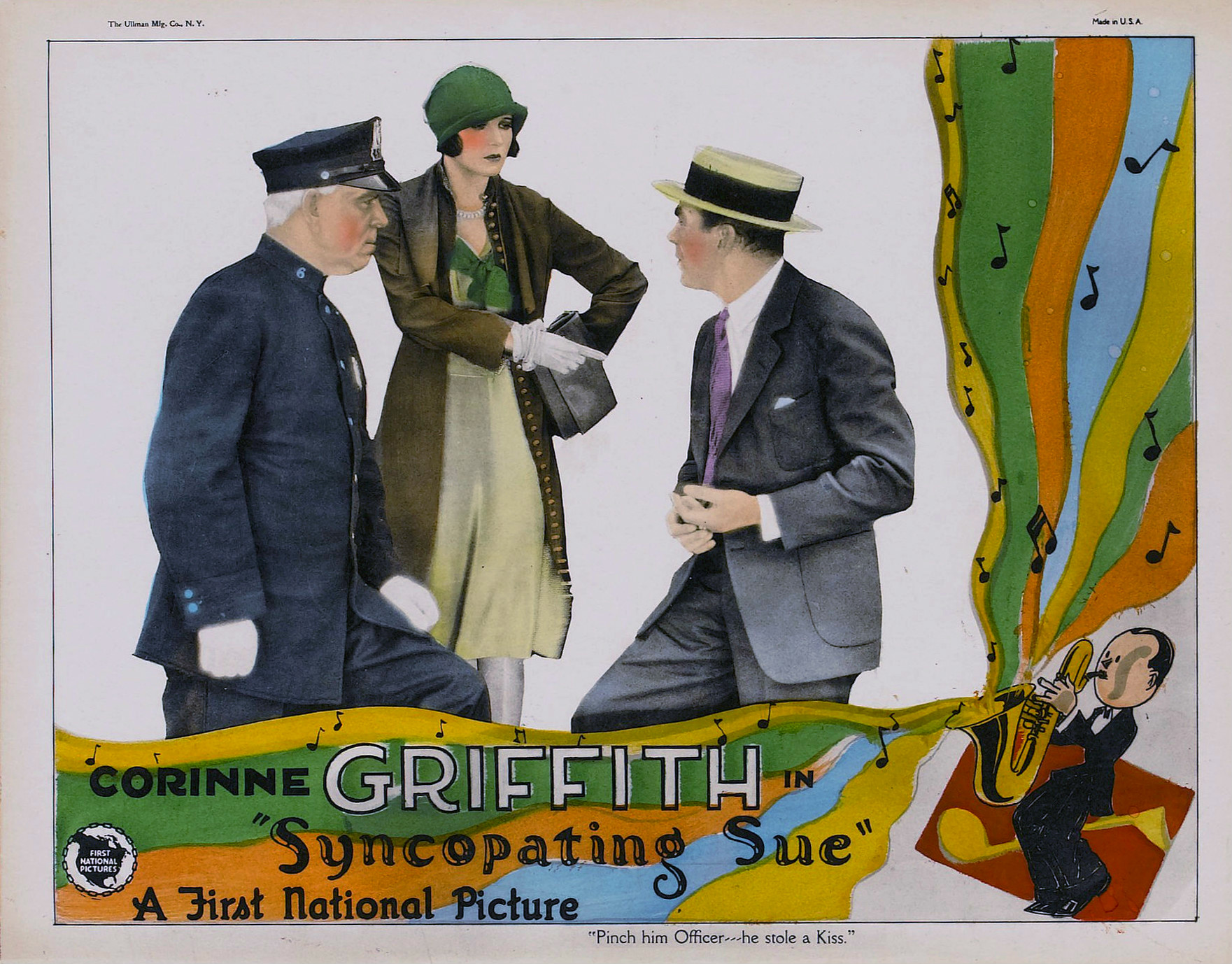
- Lobby card
- Directed by: Richard Wallace
- Written by: Adelaide Heilbron; Jack Wagner
- Based on: Ashes by Reginald B. Goode
- Produced by: Corinne Griffith
- Starring: Corinne Griffith; Tom Moore
- Cinematography: Harold Wenstrom
- Distributed by: First National Pictures
- Release date: October 31, 1926
- Running time: 70 minutes
- Country: United States
- Language: Silent (English intertitles)

Syncopating Sue is a 1926 American silent romantic comedy film directed by Richard Wallace and starring Corinne Griffith and Tom Moore. It is based on a 1924 Broadway play, Ashes by Reginald Goode.

== Cast ==
- Corinne Griffith as Susan Adams
- Tom Moore as Eddie Murphy
- Rockliffe Fellowes as Arthur Bennett
- Lee Moran as Joe Horn
- Joyce Compton as Marge Adams
- Sunshine Hart as Landlady
- Marjorie Rambeau as playing herself
- Elmo Billings

== Preservation ==
With no copies of Syncopating Sue located in any film archives, it is a lost film.
