= Kathleen Mavourneen (1930 film) =

1930 film

- DVD cover and art packaging to this film
- Directed by: Albert Ray
- Written by: Frances Hyland
- Based on: play Kathleen Mavourneen by Dion Boucicault which in turn was inspired by the song Kathleen Mavourneen by Annie Crawford and Frederick William Nichols Crouch
- Cinematography: Harry Jackson
- Distributed by: Tiffany Pictures
- Release date: June 20, 1930
- Running time: 55 minutes
- Country: USA
- Language: English

Kathleen Mavourneen is a 1930 American pre-Code sound/talking film directed by Albert Ray, stars Sally O'Neil and produced and distributed by Tiffany Pictures, and is the first talking film version of the oft-filmed Dion Boucicault play.

The last version prior to this film was a 1919 silent Fox film starring Theda Bara. Sally O'Neil would star in the 1937 all-Irish version of the story, thereby filming the story twice.

The film's sets were designed by the art director Hervey Libbert. Prints of the film are held by the Library of Congress.

== Cast ==
- Sally O'Neil as Kathleen O'Connor
- Charles Delaney as Terry
- Robert Elliott as Dan Moriarty
- Aggie Herring as Aunt Nora Shannon
- Walter Perry as Uncle Mike Shannon
- Francis Ford as James, The Butler

other

- Dannie Mac Grant – uncredited
- Donald Novis – Singer
