= Nina Quartero =

American actress (1908–1985)

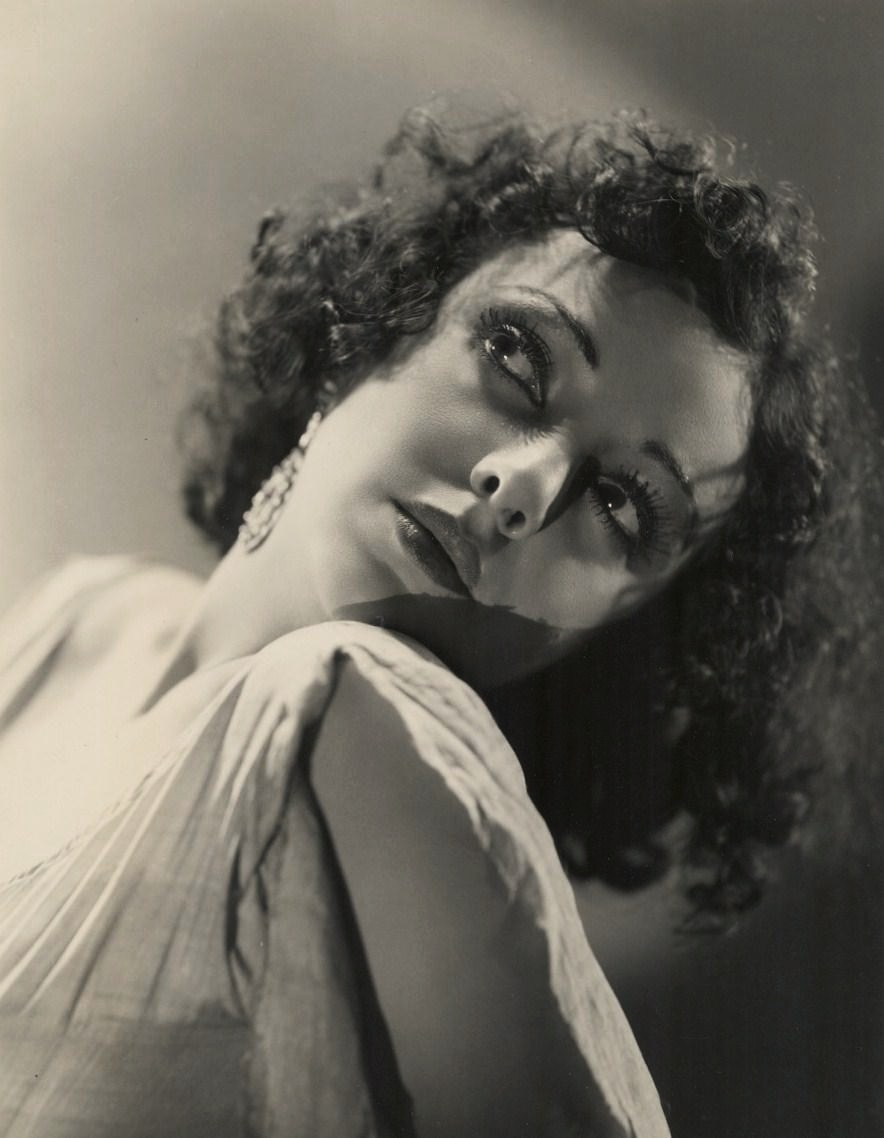
- Nina Quatero in The Monkey's Paw (1933)
- Born: Gladys Quartararo; March 17, 1908; Mount Vernon, New York, U.S.
- Died: November 23, 1985 (aged 77); Woodland Hills, California, U.S.
- Occupation: Actress
- Years active: 1929–1943
- Spouses: John C. Outhet (m. 1934–1937) Joseph C. Shea (m. 1937–1939) William Spencer Hook (m. 1944–1974)
- Children: none

Nina Quartero (born Gladys Quartararo; March 17, 1908 – November 23, 1985) was an American movie actress whose career spanned from 1928 to 1943. She starred in several shorts and later in features such as The Red Mark (1928), Frozen River (1929), and Men of the North (1930).

== Early life ==
Quartero was the daughter of Mr. and Mrs. Vincent Quartararo.

== Career ==
She appeared in One Stolen Night (1928), cast with Betty Bronson and William Collier. The story concerns a British World War I soldier who comes to the assistance of an enslaved dancer. In Frozen River (1929) she was paired with Raymond McKee as the motion picture's romantic leads.

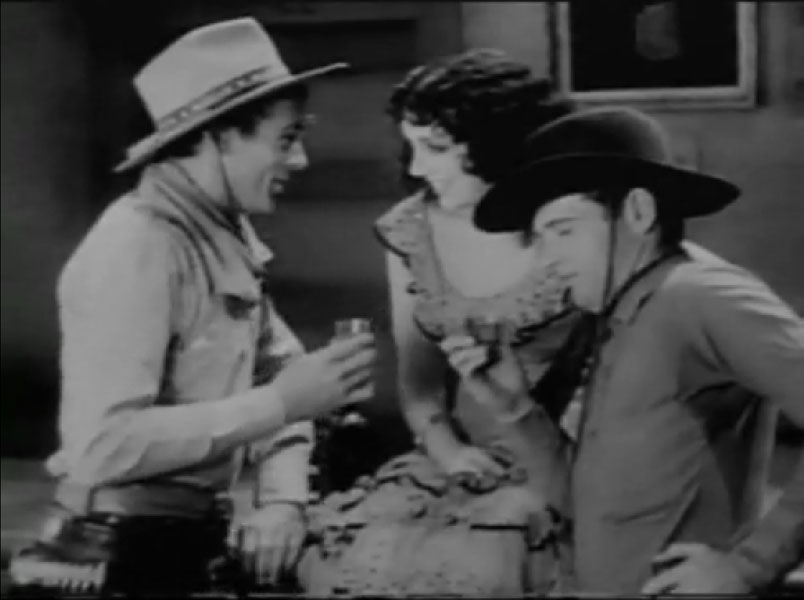
Nina Quartero in The Virginian (1929)

In 1931 Quartero appeared in Arizona, an early John Wayne movie. Playing "Conchita," she is a source of strife in Wayne's relationship to the characters depicted by Laura La Plante and June Clyde. She performed again with Wayne in The Man from Monterey (1933). Her final screen performances show Quartero playing very small parts, such as an uncredited native dancer in Green Hell (1940), and a bar-girl in A Lady Takes a Chance (1943).

== Personal life ==
Quartero once tried a publicity stunt by claiming that she was betrothed to Notre Dame All-American quarterback Frank Carideo. Carideo demanded a retraction of Quartero's engagement announcement, although he admitted he knew her from a time when each resided in Mount Vernon, New York. He had also visited her home in Beverly Hills, California prior to the 1930 University of Southern California game to exchange greetings.

== Partial filmography ==
- The Sorrows of Satan (1926) – Vamp
- Driftin' Sands (1928) – Nita Aliso
- The Red Mark (1928) – Zelie
- Noah's Ark (1928) – French Girl (uncredited)
- The Redeeming Sin (1929) – Mitzi
- One Stolen Night (1929) – Chyra
- The Eternal Woman (1929) – Consuelo
- Frozen River (1929) – Jane
- Frontier Romance (1929, Short)
- The Virginian (1929) – Girl in Bar (uncredited)
- Isle of Escape (1930) – Loru
- Golden Dawn (1930) – Maid-in-Waiting
- Men of the North (1930) – Woolie-Woolie
- New Moon (1930) – Vadda – Tanya's Maid
- The Bachelor Father (1931) – Maria Credaro
- The Hawk (1931) – Teresa Valardi
- God's Gift to Women (1931) – Suzanne – a Party Girl (uncredited)
- Trapped (1931) – Sally Moore
- The Fighting Sheriff (1931) – Tiana
- Arizona (1931) – Conchita
- Arizona Terror (1931) – Lola
- The Monkey's Paw (1933) – Nura
- Hell Below (1933) Nurse (uncredited)
- The Devil's Brother (1933) – Rita
- The Man from Monterey (1933) – Anita Garcia
- Under Secret Orders (1933) – Carmencita Alverez
- Sons of the Desert (1933) – Sons of the Desert Partygoer (uncredited)
- The Cyclone Ranger (1935) – Nita Garcia
- Vagabond Lady (1935) – Mike – Tony's Friend (uncredited)
- Wife vs. Secretary (1936) – Cuban Telephone Operator (uncredited)
- The Three Mesquiteers (1936) – Waitress
- Two in a Crowd (1936) – Celito (uncredited)
- Left-Handed Law (1937) – Chiquita
- Submarine D-1 (1937) – Panama Percentage Girl (uncredited)
- Torchy Blane in Panama (1938) – Cuban Dancer (uncredited)
- Green Hell (1940) – Native Girl (uncredited)
- A Lady Takes a Chance (1943) – Carmencita (final film role)

== Sources ==
- Charleston, West Virginia Gazette, One Stolen Night, Sunday, May 12, 1929, p. 39.
- Lima, Ohio News, In Lima Theaters, Friday, August 30, 1929, p. 16.
- New York Times, Carideo Denies Betrothal, January 4, 1931, p. 3.
