= Sunshine Hart =

Comedy actress

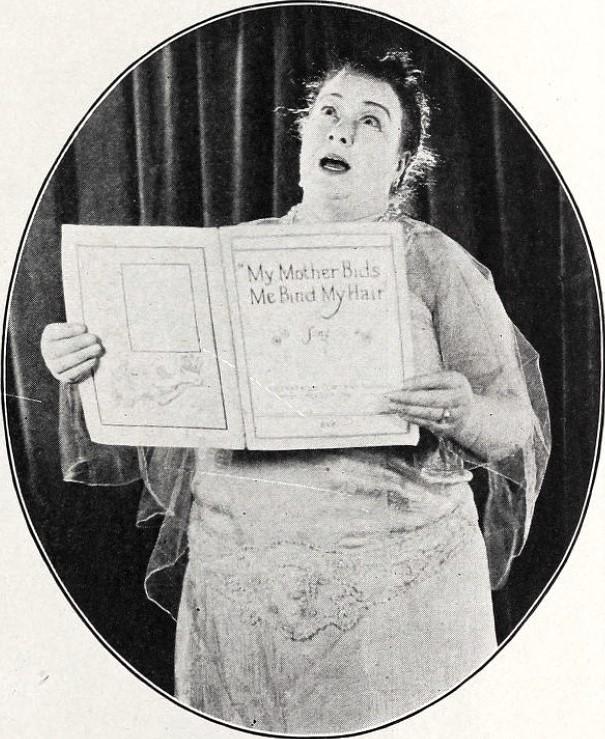

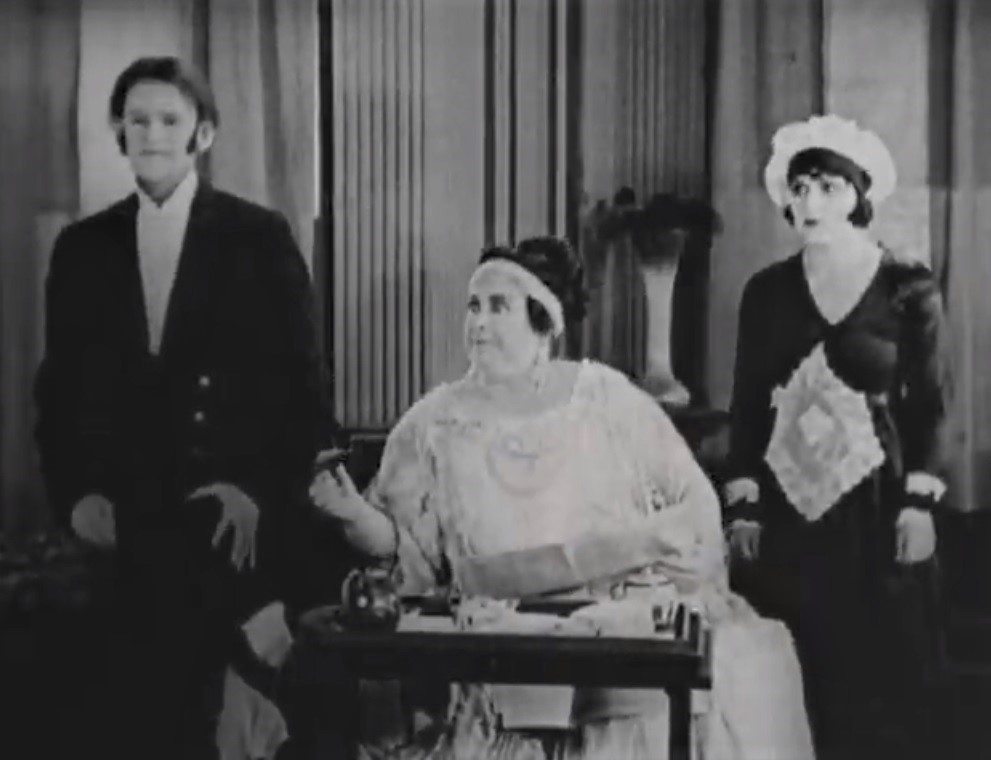
With Si Jenks in Galloping Bungalows

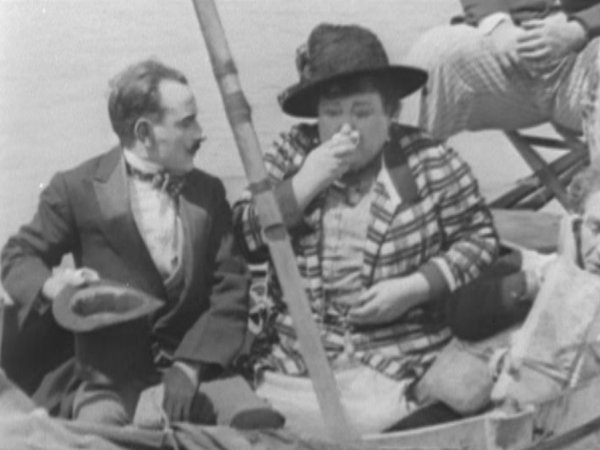
In Crazy to Act

Lucia Sunshine Hart (July 6, 1886 – January 3, 1930) was an American comedic actress. Her roles include Ma Johnson in My Best Girl. She was large. She performed with stock companies and in vaudeville before moving into films.

She was born Lycia May Adams in Indianapolis, Indiana.

A "slap-stick" comedian she worked in Mack Sennett films and for other studios including Jack White's and Fox Movietone. She was in almost 50 Sennett comedies between 1923 and 1930.

She broke an ankle working on a Mary Pickford film and was bedridden until her death. She died in Los Angeles, California.

== Filmography ==
- A Man About Town (1923) as Bit Role (uncredited)
- Galloping Bungalows (1924)
- The Iron Nag (1925)
- From Rags to Britches (1925)
- Syncopating Sue (1926) as Landlady
- Lovey Mary (1926) as Mrs. Chultz
- Crazy to Act (1927) as Mrs. St. John
- The Jolly Jitter (1927)
- My Best Girl (1927)
- The Student Prince in Old Heidelburg
- The Burglar (1928)
- Five and Ten Cent Annie (1928) as Guest
- The Man in Hobbles (1928) as Ma Harris
- Midnight Daddies (1929) as 2nd Bridge Player
- The Bride's Relations (1929)
- When a Man's a Prince
