= I Can Explain =

1922 film by George D. Baker

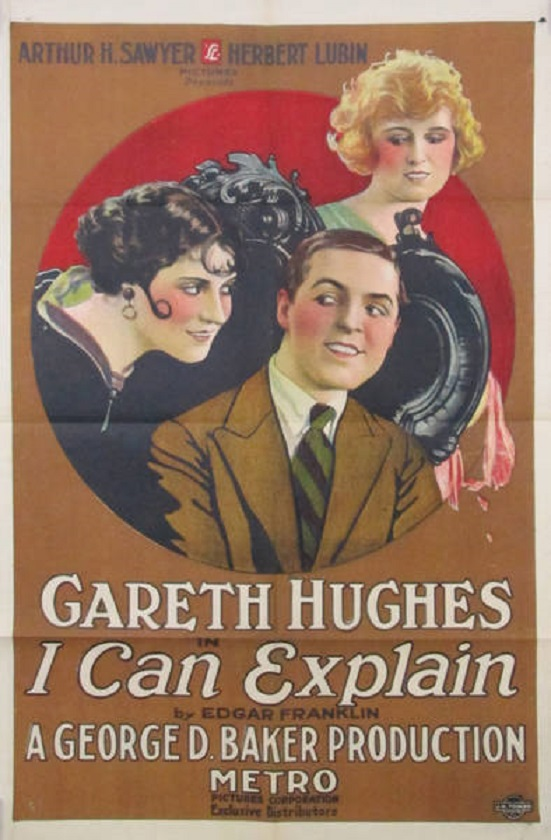
- Directed by: George D. Baker
- Written by: Edgar Franklin
- Starring: Gareth Hughes; Bartine Burkett; Grace Darmond
- Cinematography: Rudolph J. Bergquist
- Production company: Sawyer-Lubin Pictures
- Distributed by: Metro Pictures
- Release date: March 20, 1922
- Running time: 5 reels
- Country: United States
- Language: Silent (English intertitles)

I Can Explain is a 1922 American silent comedy film directed by George D. Baker and starring Gareth Hughes, Bartine Burkett, and Grace Darmond.

== Plot ==
As described in a film magazine, Jimmy Berry (Hughes), a much misunderstood young man, is persecuted by his jealous business partner Howard Dawson (Heyes) whenever the latter catches up with him. When Howard finds Jimmy and his wife Dorothy (Darmond) together on the golf links, he tries to shoot Jimmy. While Jimmy maintains that he "can explain everything," Howard will not listen. He proposes that Jimmy should relocate to the New York City office, and then to South America, to separate him from Howard's wife. When he leaves for South America, Dorothy takes the same ship and further complications arise when they are found together upon disembarking. Jimmy is thrown in jail by President Gardez (Wallock), and then becomes involved in a revolution that is being staged by some outlaws. They escape on a passing ship and Jimmy convinces Howard that he is in love with his sweetheart, Betty Carson (Burkett). They arrive back in the United States in time to save Betty from an unwelcome marriage.

== Cast ==
- Gareth Hughes as Jimmy Berry
- Bartine Burkett as Betty Carson
- Grace Darmond as Dorothy Dawson
- Herbert Heyes as Howard Dawson
- Victor Potel as Will Potter
- Nelson McDowell as Uncle Henry
- Edwin Wallock as Juan Pedro Vistuano Gardez
- Albert Breig as Miguel
- Harry Lorraine as General Huera
- Tina Modotti as Camencita Gardez
- Sidney D'Albrook as López
- Stanton Heck as El Pavor
- William H. Brown as Reverend Mr. Clark

== Bibliography ==
- Munden, Kenneth White. The American Film Institute Catalog of Motion Pictures Produced in the United States, Part 1. University of California Press, 1997.
