= Ladies of the Night Club =

1928 comedy film

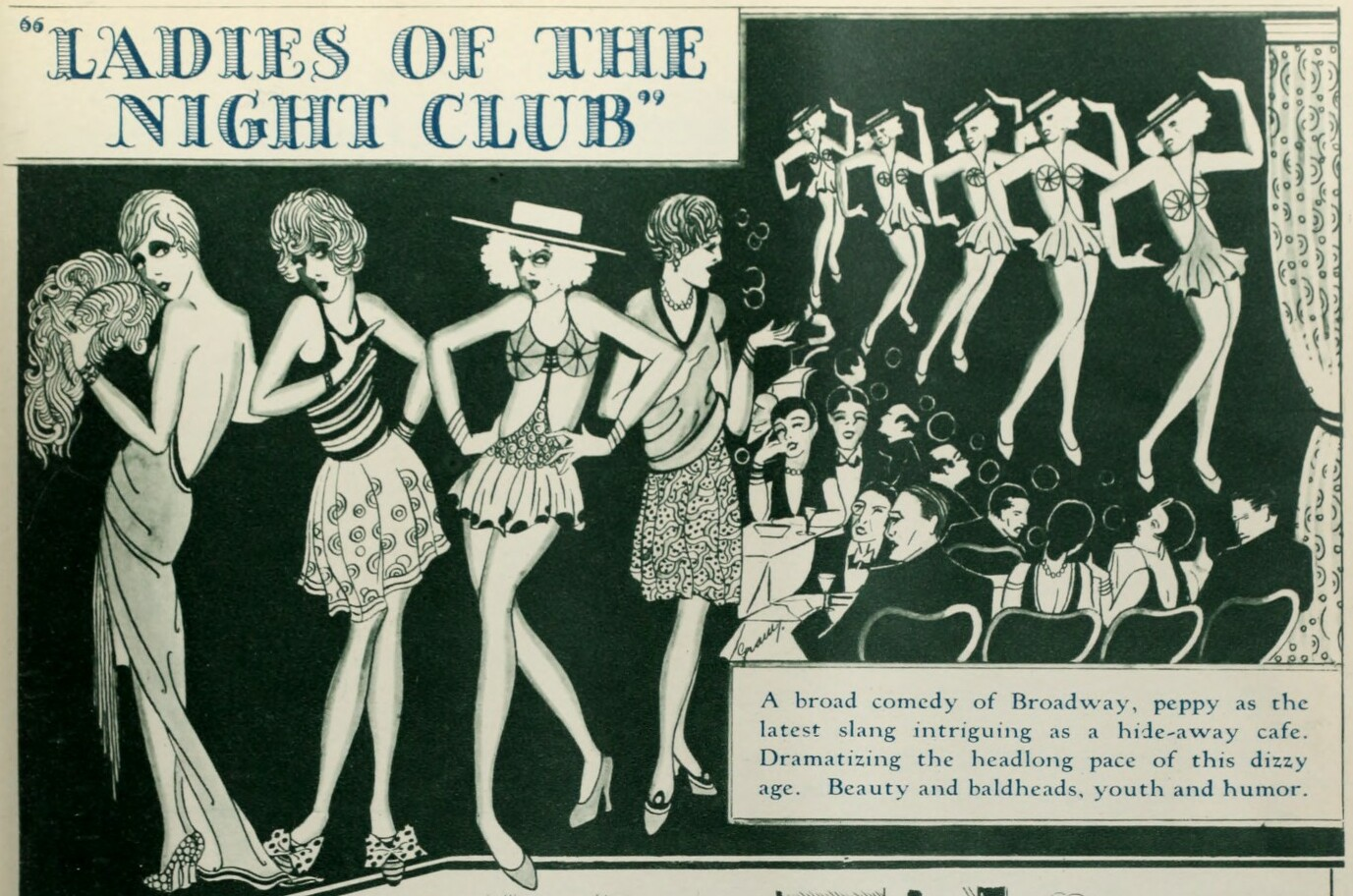
- Directed by: George Archainbaud
- Written by: Houston Branch; Ben Grauman Kohn; Jack Natteford; Paul Perez
- Produced by: John M. Stahl
- Starring: Ricardo Cortez; Barbara Leonard; Lee Moran
- Cinematography: Harry Jackson
- Edited by: Leete Renick Brown
- Production company: Tiffany-Stahl Productions
- Distributed by: Tiffany Pictures
- Release date: May 15, 1928
- Running time: 70 minutes
- Country: United States
- Language: English

Ladies of the Night Club is a 1928 American comedy film directed by George Archainbaud and starring Ricardo Cortez, Barbara Leonard and Lee Moran. It was produced during the transition to sound film and is essentially a silent film with an added soundtrack and sound effects. The film's sets were designed by the art director Hervey Libbert.

== Plot ==
The wealthy millionaire patron of a nightclub is attracted by the female half of a vaudeville show and showers her with gifts. This upsets her stage partner who hopes to marry her despite his limited wealth.

== Cast ==
- Ricardo Cortez as George Merrill
- Barbara Leonard as Dimples Revere
- Lee Moran as Joe Raggs
- Douglas Gerrard as Cyril Bathstowe
- Cissy Fitzgerald as Bossy Hart
- Charles K. Gerrard as

== Bibliography ==
- Munden, Kenneth White. The American Film Institute Catalog of Motion Pictures Produced in the United States, Part 1. University of California Press, 1997.
