= The Gentleman from America =

1923 film directed by Edward Sedgwick

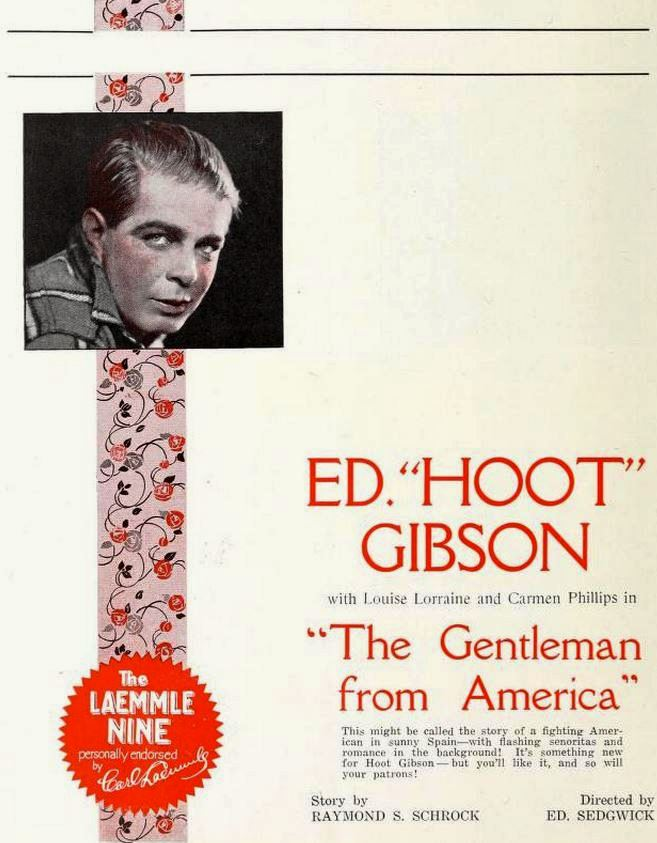
- Ad for the film
- Directed by: Edward Sedgwick
- Written by: George C. Hull (screenplay); Raymond L. Schrock (story)
- Produced by: Carl Laemmle
- Starring: Hoot Gibson; Louise Lorraine; Tom O'Brien; Boris Karloff (bit part)
- Cinematography: Virgil Miller
- Distributed by: Universal Pictures
- Release date: February 19, 1923
- Running time: 50 minutes
- Country: United States
- Language: Silent (English intertitles)

The Gentleman from America is a 1923 American silent comedy film directed by Edward Sedgwick and featuring Hoot Gibson and Louise Lorraine. It also featured a young Boris Karloff in an uncredited bit part. The screenplay was written by George C. Hull, based on a story by Raymond L. Schrock. The film's tagline was "This might be called the story of a fighting American in sunny Spain - with flashing senoritas and romance in the background! It's something new for Hoot Gibson - but you'll like it, and so will your patrons!" It is considered a lost film.

== Plot ==
Two pals in the American Expeditionary Forces in France during World War I, Dennis O'Shane and Johnny Day, are given a furlough. With a borrowed dollar, they clean up in a craps game and head for Paris. They board the wrong train and land in Cardonia, a principality of Spain. Dennis is mistaken for a desperate bandito and, at the same time, falls in love with Carmen Navarro, the prettiest senorita in Cardonia.

In a series of adventures, Dennis saves her from marriage to a villain, learns she is the daughter of the Grand Duke, and becomes the assistant ruler of the kingdom. In his excitement, he forgets that he is a member of the American A.E.F. until a couple of husky M.P.s arrive on scene to cart him off to a military prison. He leaves his bride with the excuse that General Pershing has called him back to take charge of the Army, but he will return as soon as he gets the country's affairs in such shape that he can turn them over to an assistant.

== Cast ==
- Hoot Gibson as Dennis O'Shane (credited as Ed "Hoot" Gibson)
- Tom O'Brien as Johnny Day
- Louise Lorraine as Carmen Navarro
- Carmen Phillips as The Vamp
- Frank Leigh as Don Ramón Gonzales
- Jack Crane as Juan Gonzales
- Robert McKenzie as San Felipe (credited as Bob McKenzie)
- Albert Prisco as Grand Duke
- Rosa Rosanova as Old Inez
- Ricardo Cortez as Bit Role (uncredited)
- Sidney De Gray as Bit Role (uncredited)
- Boris Karloff as Bit Role (uncredited)
- Burton Law as Bit Role (uncredited)
- Karl Silvera as Bit Role (uncredited)

== See also ==
- Hoot Gibson filmography
- Boris Karloff filmography
