= The Hawk (1931 film) =

1931 western film

- Directed by: Jacques Jaccard
- Written by: Charles F. Royal
- Produced by: Louis Weiss
- Starring: Norman Kerry; Nina Quartero; Frank Mayo
- Cinematography: Otto Himm
- Edited by: William P. Thompson
- Production company: Pioneer Multi-Color
- Distributed by: Romantic Productions
- Release date: March 15, 1931
- Running time: 70 minutes
- Country: United States
- Language: English

The Hawk is a 1931 American independent Western film directed by Jacques Jaccard and starring Norman Kerry, Nina Quartero and Frank Mayo. Given a limited initial release, it was re-edited and re-released under the alternative title The Phantom of Santa Fe in 1936.

== Cast ==
- Norman Kerry as Miguel Morago - aka The Hawk
- Nina Quartero as Teresa Valardi
- Frank Mayo as Steve Gant
- Tom O'Brien as Killdane
- Fernando Valdez as Ramariez
- Carmelita Geraghty as Lolita
- Jack Mower as Capt. Rubio
- Charles Brinley as Pedro
- Steve Clemente as A Vaquero
- Ben Corbett a Prisoner
- Monte Montague as Henchman

== See also ==
- List of early color feature films

== Bibliography ==
- Pitts, Michael R. Western Movies: A Guide to 5,105 Feature Films. McFarland, 2012.
