= The Making of a Man =

1911 film directed by D. W. Griffith

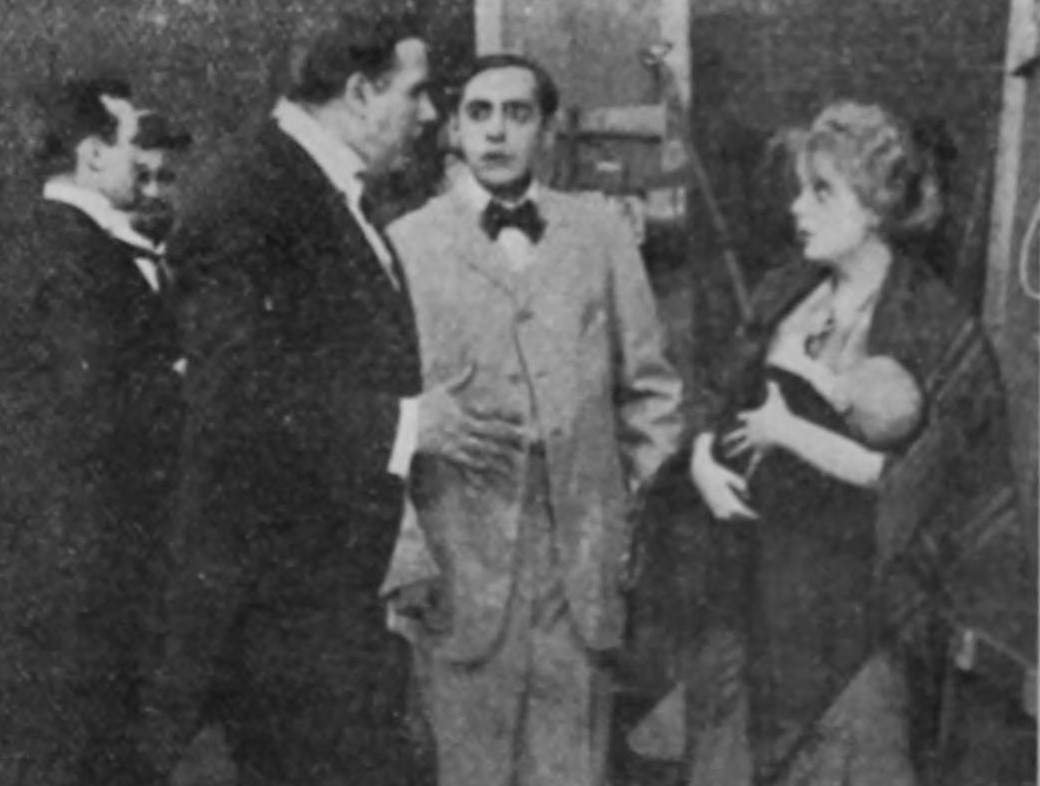
- Scene from the film
- Directed by: D. W. Griffith
- Written by: R. L. Bond; Leona Radnor (uncredited)
- Based on: "The Making of a Man" by John Fleming Wilson
- Produced by: Biograph Company; New York City
- Starring: Blanche Sweet; Dell Henderson
- Cinematography: G. W. Bitzer
- Distributed by: General Film Company, New York City
- Release date: October 5, 1911
- Running time: 15–16 minutes (release length 1000 feet)
- Country: United States
- Language: Silent (English intertitles)

The Making of a Man is a 1911 American short silent drama film produced by the Biograph Company of New York, directed by D. W. Griffith, and starring Dell Henderson and Blanche Sweet.

== Cast ==
- Dell Henderson as Leading Man
- Blanche Sweet as Young Woman
- Edwin August as Young Woman's Family (unconfirmed)
- William J. Butler as Young Woman's Family
- Donald Crisp as Actor / Backstage
- Claire McDowell as Actress
- Mabel Normand as In Second Audience
- Gladys Egan (role unspecified)

== See also ==
- D. W. Griffith filmography
- Blanche Sweet filmography
