= A Princess of Destiny =

1929 film

- Directed by: Tom Terriss
- Written by: Jack Cunningham
- Story by: Aubrey Scotto
- Produced by: Herbert T. Kalmus
- Starring: Anders Randolf; Doris Lloyd; Dorothy Gould; Lloyd Ingraham; Fairfax Burger
- Cinematography: Allen M. Davey
- Production companies: Metro-Goldwyn-Mayer; Technicolor Corporation
- Distributed by: Metro-Goldwyn-Mayer
- Release date: May 4, 1929
- Country: United States
- Languages: Silent; English Intertitles
- Budget: $14,612

A Princess of Destiny is a 1929 MGM short silent film short in two-color Technicolor. It was the eleventh and penultimate film produced as part of Metro-Goldwyn-Mayer's "Great Events" series.

== Plot ==
The film depicts the last days of Anne Boleyn, the second wife of King Henry VIII of England.

== Production ==
Doris Lloyd played Anne Boleyn, while Anders Randolf was Henry VIII. The film was shot at the Tec-Art Studio in Hollywood. Early versions of the script used the titles A Royal Lover and The Royal Duckling.

== Preservation Status ==
A Princess of Destiny is believed to be lost.
