= The Bees' Buzz =

1929 film

- Directed by: Mack Sennett
- Written by: Hampton Del Ruth; Harry McCoy; Earle Rodney; John A. Waldron
- Produced by: Mack Sennett
- Starring: See below
- Cinematography: John W. Boyle; Ernie Crockett
- Edited by: William Hornbeck
- Distributed by: Educational Pictures
- Release date: April 7, 1929
- Running time: 21 minutes
- Country: United States
- Language: English

The Bees' Buzz is a 1929 American film directed by Mack Sennett.

== Plot ==
The film

== Cast ==
- Harry Gribbon as Homer Ashcraft
- Andy Clyde as Peggy's father
- Barbara Leonard as Peggy
- Tyler Brooke as Peggy's suitor
- Vernon Dent as Jim
- Ruth Kane as A party guest
- Billy Gilbert
