= Crazy to Act =

1927 film

- Crazy to Act
- Directed by: Earle Rodney
- Written by: Carl Harbaugh; Mildred June; Harry McCoy; Jefferson Moffitt; Earle Rodney
- Produced by: Mack Sennett
- Starring: Oliver Hardy
- Release date: May 15, 1927
- Running time: 25 minutes
- Country: United States
- Languages: Silent film English intertitles

Crazy to Act is a 1927 American silent short comedy film directed by Earle Rodney and featuring Oliver Hardy.

== Plot ==
Ethel St. John was in love with the bland, but poor, Arthur Young. Mrs. St. John, Ethel's mother, preferred, however, the millionaire Gordon Bagley, to be Ethel's husband. Ethel agreed to marry Bagley only if he made her a movie star.

From then on, everything went wrong for Mr. Bagley. The film he financed for Ethel was made by inept filmmakers, and the film's hero was no one but his rival, Arthur Young.

== Cast ==
- Matty Kemp as Arthur Young
- Mildred June as Ethel St. John
- Oliver Hardy as Gordon Bagley
- Sunshine Hart as Mrs. St. John
- Jack Cooper as The movie heavy

== See also ==
- List of American films of 1927
