= Square Deal Sanderson =

1919 film

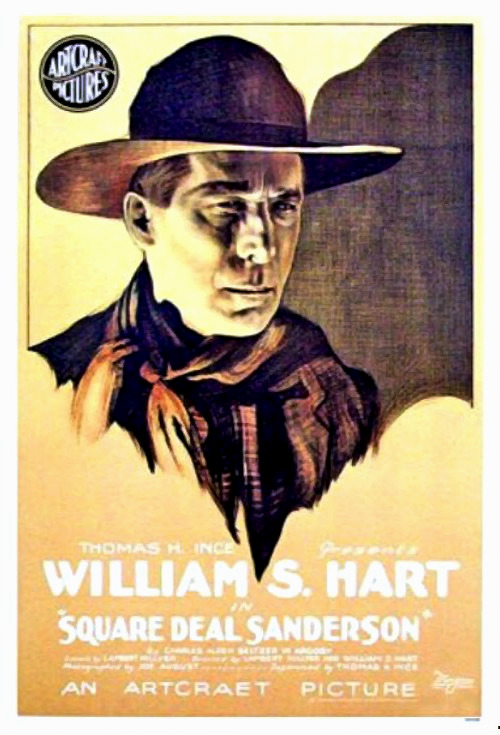
- Film poster
- Directed by: William S. Hart; Lambert Hillyer
- Screenplay by: Lambert Hillyer; Charles Alden Seltzer
- Produced by: William S. Hart; Thomas H. Ince
- Starring: William S. Hart; Ann Little; Frank Whitson; Lloyd Bacon; Edwin Wallock; Tom O'Brien
- Cinematography: Joseph H. August
- Production companies: Famous Players–Lasky Corporation; Artcraft Pictures Corporation; William S. Hart Productions
- Distributed by: Paramount Pictures
- Release date: June 15, 1919
- Running time: 50 minutes
- Country: United States
- Languages: Silent; English intertitles

Square Deal Sanderson is a 1919 American silent Western film directed by William S. Hart and Lambert Hillyer, written by Lambert Hillyer and Charles Alden Seltzer, and starring William S. Hart, Ann Little, Frank Whitson, Lloyd Bacon, Edwin Wallock and Tom O'Brien. It was released on June 15, 1919, by Paramount Pictures. A print of the film is held by the Library of Congress and in other film archives.

== Cast ==
- William S. Hart as Square Deal Sanderson
- Ann Little as Mary Bransford
- Frank Whitson as Alva Dale
- Lloyd Bacon as Barney Owen
- Edwin Wallock as Maison
- Tom O'Brien as Williams
- Andrew Robson as Judge Graney
