= The Man from Yesterday =

1932 film

- Directed by: Berthold Viertel
- Written by: Oliver H.P. Garrett; Story: Neil Blackwell; Rowland G. Edwards
- Starring: Claudette Colbert; Clive Brook
- Cinematography: Karl Struss
- Music by: Herman Hand; Rudolph G. Kopp; John Leipold
- Production company: Paramount Pictures
- Distributed by: Paramount Pictures
- Release date: June 24, 1932
- Running time: 71 minutes
- Country: United States
- Language: English

The Man from Yesterday is a 1932 American pre-Code romantic war drama film made by Paramount Pictures, directed by Berthold Viertel, and written by Oliver H. P. Garrett, based on a story by Neil Blackwell and Rowland G. Edwards.

== Plot ==
In Paris at the end of the First World War, Sylvia Suffolk and British Expeditionary Force officer Tony Clyde get married, shortly before Tony leaves for the Western Front. Sylvia, newly pregnant, is given the news that Tony was killed in a poison gas attack while working as a nurse for surgeon René Gaudin. Sylvia gradually falls in love with René but is reluctant to remarry since she has no official news of Tony's death. On holiday in Switzerland with René, Sylvia is shocked to find Tony is still alive and convalescing, having been taken prisoner of war with lung damage. Sylva now finds herself torn between duty to Tony and marriage to René. She ultimately decides to stay with Tony and takes him to Paris to see their son, but he realizes that she is still in love with Rene and kills himself.

== Cast ==
- Claudette Colbert as Sylvia Suffolk
- Clive Brook as Capt. Tony Clyde
- Charles Boyer as Rene Gaudin
- Andy Devine as Steve Hand
- Alan Mowbray as Dr. Waite
- Greta Meyer as inn proprietress
- Barbara Leonard as Steve's girl
- Yola d'Avril as Tony's girl
- Emile Chautard as priest
- George Davis as taxi driver
- Christian Rub as terrace waiter
