= The Sagebrusher =

1920 film

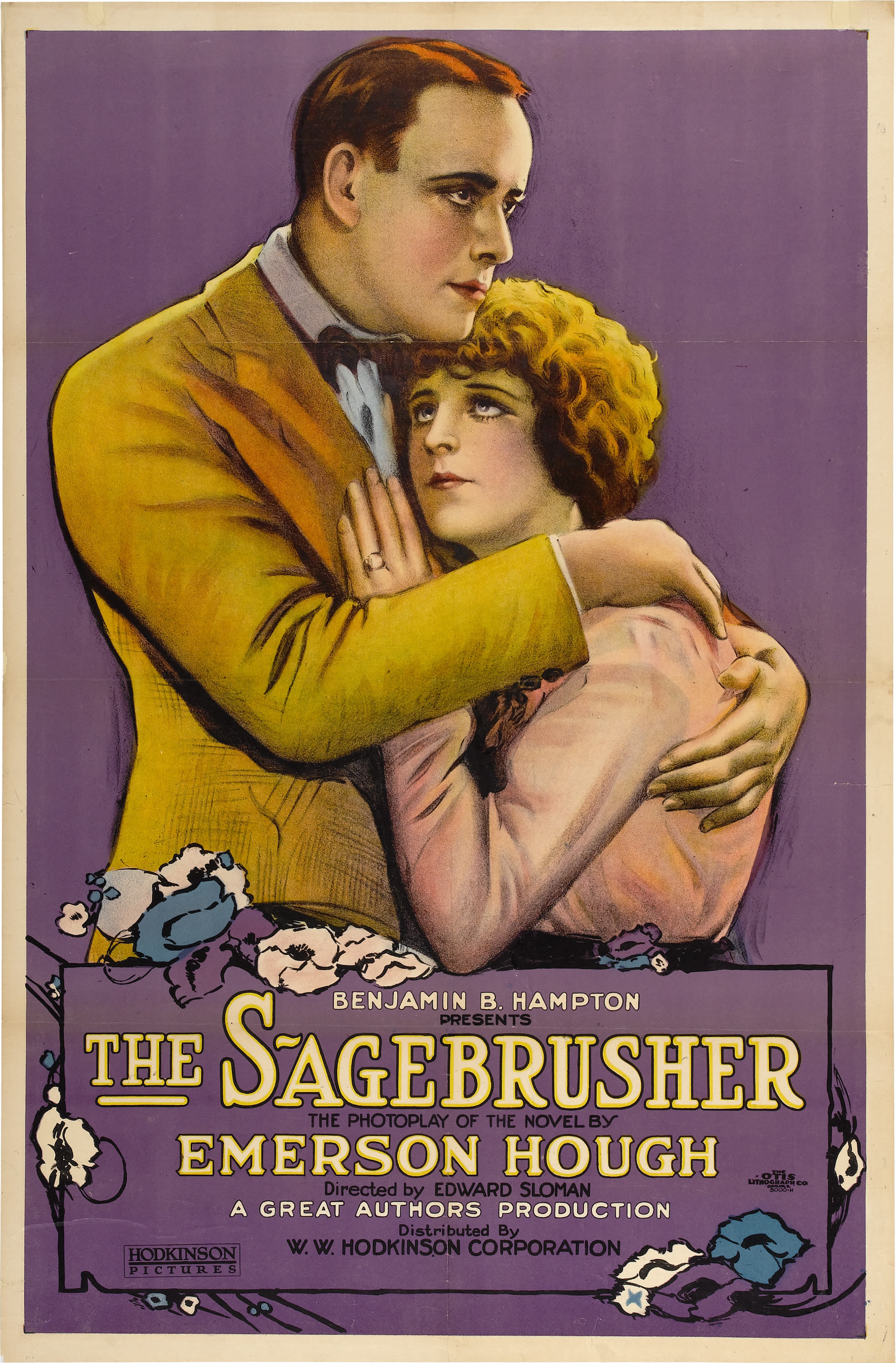
- Directed by: Edward Sloman
- Written by: Emerson Hough (novel); William Clifford
- Produced by: Benjamin B. Hampton
- Starring: Roy Stewart; Marguerite De La Motte; Noah Beery
- Cinematography: John F. Seitz
- Production company: Great Authors Pictures
- Distributed by: Pathé Exchange; W. W. Hodkinson Corporation
- Release date: January 1920
- Running time: 70 minutes
- Country: United States
- Languages: Silent; English intertitles

The Sagebrusher is a 1920 American silent Western film directed by Edward Sloman and starring Roy Stewart, Marguerite De La Motte and Noah Beery.

== Cast ==
- Roy Stewart as Dr. Barnes
- Marguerite De La Motte as Mary Warren
- Noah Beery as Sim Gage
- Betty Brice as Annie Squires
- Arthur Morrison as Wid Gardner
- J. Gordon Russell as Big Aleck
- Edwin Wallock as Frederick Waldhorn
- Tom O'Brien as Charlie Dornewald
- Aggie Herring as Mrs. Jensen

== Bibliography ==
- Goble, Alan. The Complete Index to Literary Sources in Film. Walter de Gruyter, 1999.
