= Trapped (1931 film) =

1931 film

- Directed by: Bruce M. Mitchell
- Written by: Edith Brown; Jackson Parks
- Starring: Nick Stuart; Priscilla Dean; Nina Quartero
- Production company: Hollywood Syndicate
- Distributed by: Big 4 Film
- Release date: April 14, 1931
- Running time: 63 minutes
- Country: United States
- Language: English

Trapped is a 1931 American crime drama film directed by Bruce M. Mitchell and starring Nick Stuart, Priscilla Dean and Nina Quartero.

== Cast ==
- Nick Stuart as Jerry Coleman
- Priscilla Dean as Bettina Moore
- Nina Quartero as Sally Moore
- Tom Santschi as Captain William Baxter
- George Regas as Jim Moore
- Tom O'Brien as Joe Farley
- Jimmy Aubrey as Ferguson
- Reed Howes as Tiger Callahan
- Patsy Daly as Lena
- Edmund Cobb as Cafe Customer Thief
- George DeNormand as Sally's Chauffeur
- Art Mix as Tiger's Man
- Monte Montague as Slug - Moore's Henchman
- George Morrell as Cafe Customer Drunk
- Robert D. Walker as Policeman

== Bibliography ==
- Michael R. Pitts. Poverty Row Studios, 1929–1940: An Illustrated History of 55 Independent Film Companies, with a Filmography for Each. McFarland & Company, 2005.
