= The Red Mark =

1928 film by James Cruze

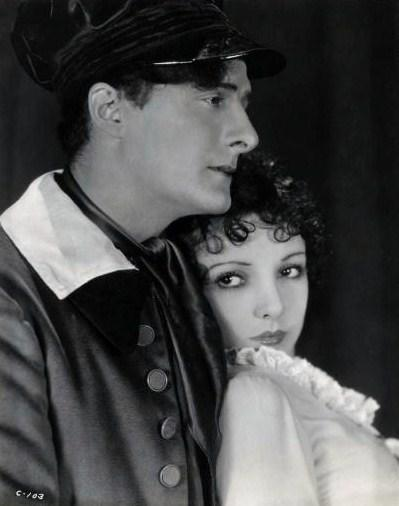
- Still with Gaston Glass and Nina Quartero
- Directed by: James Cruze
- Written by: Julien Josephson
- Story by: John Russell
- Produced by: James Cruze
- Starring: Gaston Glass; Nina Quartero
- Cinematography: Ira H. Morgan
- Edited by: Mildred Johnston
- Distributed by: Pathé Exchange
- Release date: August 26, 1928
- Running time: 80 minutes
- Country: United States
- Language: Silent (English intertitles)

The Red Mark is a 1928 American silent melodrama film produced and directed by James Cruze and starring Gaston Glass. It was distributed through Pathé Exchange.

== Cast ==
- Nina Quartero as Zelie
- Gaston Glass as Bibi-Ri
- Gustav von Seyffertitz as De Nou
- Rose Dione as Mother Caron
- Luke Cosgrave as Papa Caron
- Eugene Pallette as Sergeo
- Jack Roper as Bombiste
- Charles Dervis as The Lame Priest

== Preservation status ==
The film is preserved in the Library of Congress collection.
