= The Cold Deck (film) =

1917 film

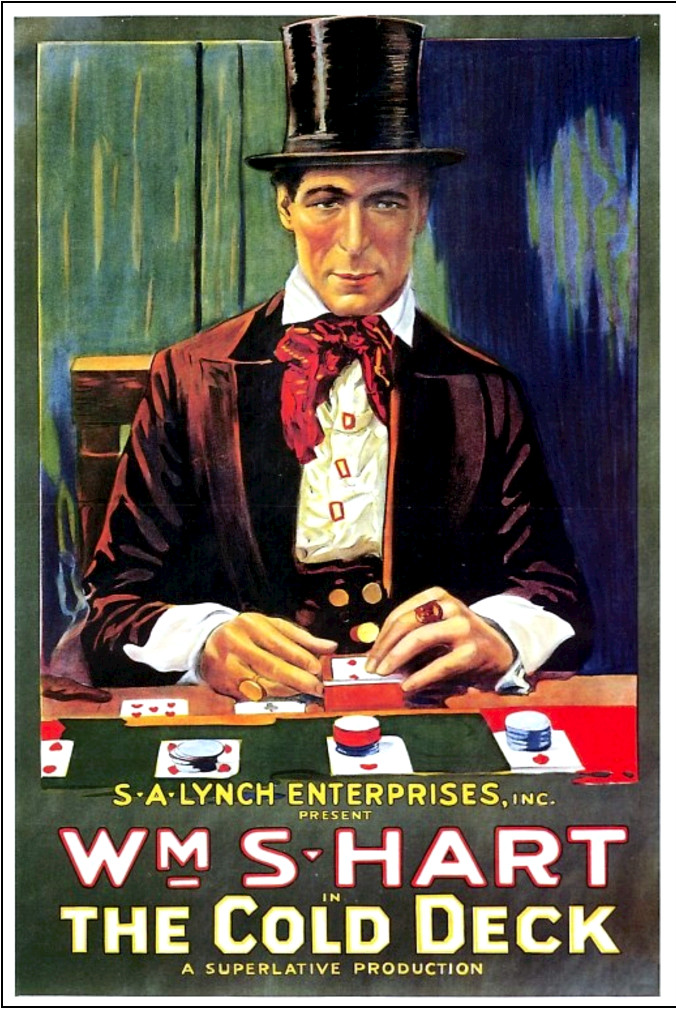
- Film poster
- Directed by: William S. Hart
- Written by: J.G. Hawks (story & screenplay)
- Starring: William S. Hart; Mildred Harris
- Cinematography: Joseph H. August
- Production company: New York Film Corporation
- Distributed by: Triangle Film
- Release date: September 3, 1917
- Running time: 70 minutes
- Country: United States
- Languages: Silent; English intertitles

The Cold Deck is a 1917 American silent Western film directed by and starring William S. Hart.

An incomplete copy of the film is at the Library of Congress.

== Plot ==
As described in a film trade magazine, "Level" Leigh, a notorious gambler, endeavors to keep his profession a secret from his sister Alice, who is an invalid. He plans to win a sufficient amount of money to give her proper care and restore her health. Coralie, a Spanish dancer, is infatuated with Leigh, but when he returns little attention she has him "cold decked" and he loses all his money. The immediate need for a physician and his lack of funds lead Leigh to hold up a stage coach, but his little sister dies. When Leigh becomes wanted for the murder of a messenger, he gives himself up even though he did not commit the murder. The citizens are planning to lynch Leigh, but one man helps him to escape. While in hiding, he unearths the money from the stage coach. Leigh brings the real murderer of the messenger, "Black Jack" Hurley, back to town where he gets his just deserts. Leigh is urged to remain in the town, and Rose Larkin, daughter of the murdered messenger, promises to look after him.

== Cast ==
- William S. Hart as "Level" Leigh
- Mildred Harris as Alice Leigh
- Edwin N. Wallock as Black Jack
- Sylvia Breamer as Rose Larkin (credited as Sylvia Bremer)
- Charles O. Rush as Ace Hutton
- Alma Rubens as Coralie
- Joe Knight as Vigilante Chief
